= Marilyn Imrie =

Scottish radio director (1947–2020)

Marilyn Elsie Imrie (20 November 1947 – 21 August 2020) was a Scottish theatre and radio drama director and producer. She was joint-chair of the board of Stellar Quines Theatre Company and a trustee of the new writing theatre company Paines Plough.

== Career ==
Marilyn Imrie worked in drama and broadcasting in Scotland and England for over thirty years as a producer and director, for the BBC, ITV and the independent companies Absolutely Productions, Bona Broadcasting, CBL, CIM, Kindle Entertainment and Sweet Talk. She was a drama producer in radio and television in BBC Scotland for twelve years before moving to London to devise and launch the BBC Radio 4 soap Citizens in 1987, then drama commissioning editor for BBC Radio 4 until 1999.

Imrie was a script executive for BBC Scotland Television drama, a drama development executive for three major independent companies and a producer and director in radio drama and in the theatre. She was awarded Sony, TRIC and Talkies awards for her radio production work, the Samuel Beckett Award for television drama for Paris (BBC Scotland for BBC 2) and an RTS Award for her work on the animation series Big & Small, starring Lenny Henry and Imelda Staunton.

Her BBC Radio work included twenty Rumpole plays, twenty-three of The Stanley Baxter Playhouse, eight Two Pipe Problems, four series of Baggage, and the Classic Serials: My Last Duchess, The Book of Love, Great Expectations, Lady Chatterley's Lover, The Card, Clarissa, The Lost World and The Heat of the Day. Theatre work includes: Overdue South by Jules Horne for the Traverse Theatre/BBC Scotland, Lie Down Comic by John Mortimer, The Bones Boys by Colin MacDonald for Òran Mór, Elsie and Mairi Go To War by Diane Atkinson, Blow Me Beautiful by Gabriel Quigley and Vicki Liddelle, Daphnis and Chloe adapted by Hattie Naylor for Òran Mór, Mortimer's Miscellany for the Henley Festival, and Prunella Scales and Edward Fox in their theatre entertainment English Eccentrics.

== Personal life ==
Daughter of John Campbell Imrie, of Redroofs, Markinch, Fife, Scotland, Marilyn Imrie married twice, the first (to actor Kenny Ireland) ending in divorce, the second in 1985 to the novelist and film-maker James Runcie, the son of Robert Runcie who was Archbishop of Canterbury from 1980 to 1991. Imrie had two daughters: Rosie Kellagher is a freelance theatre director who won an Arches Award for Directors in 2007, and directed Small Blue Thing, Mother Father Son and Macmillan's Marvellous Motion Machine for radio; and Charlotte Runcie, a writer and poet. The family lived in Edinburgh, Scotland.

Marilyn Imrie died at home in Edinburgh on 21 August 2020 from motor neurone disease.

== Radio plays ==
Radio Plays Directed or Produced by Marilyn Imrie
Date first broadcast	Play	Author	Cast	Synopsis Awards	Station Series
20 October 1989 (Recorded on 28 September 1989)	Pratt's Fall	Stewart Parker	Michael Williams, John Moffatt, Kerry Shale, James Greene, David King, Isla Blair, Dermot Crowley, Maurice Roëves, Susan Wooldridge	If you were an attractive, strong-minded female academic, and a Glaswegian ex-monk sporting a small gold earring offered you a map proving that the Irish discovered America in the 9th Century, would you fall for it?	BBC Radio 3
13 March 1990	Fair Kirsten	Kaj Nissen translated by Julian Garner	Gerda Stevenson	Young Kirsten, the King's sister, heavy with child, is destined to dance through the night with 12 men. None of them can weary her, but the 13th, the King, ends the dance forever. The original Danish version of this play won the Prix Futura Berlin 1989.	BBC Radio 3
4 May 1990 – 8 June 1990 (Recorded on 19 March 1990 – 2 April 1990)	Far from the Madding Crowd	Thomas Hardy dramatised by Nick McCarty	Janet Maw, Hetty Baynes, James Greene, Michael Kilgarriff, Stephen Garlick, Roger Hammond, David Burke, Tim McInnerny	Thomas Hardy's Wessex tragedy sees the emancipated Bathsheba Everdene inherit her father's farm, and change the lives of 3 men.	BBC Radio 4
9 May 1990 (Recorded on 17 January 1990)	Bright as a Light, Simple as a Ring	Catherine Czerkawska	Emma Bunton, Tom Wilkinson, Barbara Atkinson, Kelda Holmes	Joanna replies to Raoul, imprisoned in Chile. He never replies – but what will happen when he is released?	BBC Radio 4
11 June 1990	Blood and Ice	Liz Lochhead	Jack Klaff, Tilly Vosburgh, Stella Gonet, Gerda Stevenson, Stephen Boxer	In 1816 Mary Wollstonecraft eloped with her lover Percy Shelley to the shores of Lake Geneva into a villa close to Lord Byron, where she created Frankenstein.	BBC Radio 4 The Monday Play
9 July 1990 (Recorded on 1 May 1990)	Cloud Cuckoo Land	Catherine Czerkawska	Brian Miller, Stephen Tompkinson, Ben Onwukwe, Burt Kwouk	Japanese girl Mitsuko falls in love with British boy Leon. In colour, race and custom, they are worlds apart.	BBC Radio 4 The Monday Play
13 August 1991 (Recorded on 15 May 1991)	Purgatory	Marcy Kahan	Stuart Milligan, Auriol Smith, Miriam Karlin, Bill Paterson	Three very different people meet in purgatory and discover that the hereafter isn't quite what they imagined.	BBC Radio 3
26 November 1992 – 31 December 1992	Little Women	Louisa M Alcott dramatised by Marcy Kahan	Jemma Redgrave, Gayle Hunnicutt, Kara Zediker	Louisa M Alcott's endearing novel of four sisters growing up in 19th century New England. The girls are each given some money for Christmas and are anxious to spend it.	BBC Radio 4
11 February 1993 – 18 March 1993	Good Wives	Louisa M Alcott dramatised by Marcy Kahan	Jemma Redgrave, Gayle Hunnicutt, Martin Jarvis	Louisa May Alcott's classic sequel to Little Women.	BBC Radio 4
29 December 1997	A Christmas Card	Paul Theroux dramatised by Nick Warburton	Michael Maloney	A snowbound family is given a Christmas card by a mysterious old man. The card is both a map and a talisman which illuminates the meaning of Christmas for the children and their parents.	BBC Radio 4
21 February 1998	Beatrix	Beatrix Potter adapted by Patrick Garland and Judy Taylor; Music composed by Carl Davis	Patricia Routledge; Music performed by Osian Ellis and Philippa Davies	The real-life story of the much-loved children's writer Beatrix Potter.	BBC Radio 4
27 April 1998 – 1 May 1998	Postcards: "Sunblock"	Ginnie Hole	Teresa Gallagher, Russell Boulter	Chalk-and-cheese sisters Kirstie and Zo spend a week at the Porthant Bay Hotel, tracing their family roots and reconciling their considerable differences.	BBC Radio 4 Woman's Hour Drama
6 July 1998 – 10 July 1998	"What's Inside a Girl?"	Mike Walker based on the original story by Michele Hanson	Paola Dionisotti, Edna Doré, Luisa Bradshaw-White	Gillian and her friends tackle middle age head-on – with varying degrees of damage – as they wrestle with VPL and HRT.	BBC Radio 4 Woman's Hour Drama
26 January 1999 – 2 March 1999	"Coming Alive"	Jim Eldridge	Karl Howman, Phyllis Logan	An ex-con gets a chance to prove himself and find his feet again by reviving a run-down community centre with assistance from a social worker who has a warm heart and an unhappy past.	BBC Radio 4
16 May 1999	"The Perfect Days"	Liz Lochhead	Siobhan Redmond, Vincent Friell, Enzo Cilenti	A sharp and poignant comedy about how romantic love, mother love and friendship, affect one woman as she goes about trying to get what she really wants.	BBC Radio 4
12 June 1999	"The Summer of a Dormouse"	John Mortimer	Paul Scofield, Alex Jennings, Imelda Staunton, Gemma Jones	An elderly man stands in the darkening garden of a vicarage by the sea and looks back on a life which seems to have passed as swiftly as Lord Byron's dormouse summer.	BBC Radio 4 Saturday Play
25 October 1999 – 3 December 1999	Nicholas Nickleby (Note: Directed by Marilyn Imrie and Jeremy Mortimer)	Charles Dickens dramatised by Mike Walker, Georgia Pritchett	Oliver Milburn, Alex Jennings, Ken Campbell, Anna Massey, Richard Johnson, Tom Baker, David Bamber	The story is of Nicholas's triumph against adversity: he defeats his wicked Uncle Ralph and the loathsome Squeers to carve out a life for himself, his family and the pitiful boy, Smike. Eventually he wins the hand of a beautiful girl, Madeline Bray.	BBC Radio 4 Woman's Hour Drama
18 December 1999	The Children of Green Knowe	Lucy M Boston dramatised by Brian Sibley	Patricia Routledge	The story of Tolly, who has been sent to spend his Christmas holidays with his great-grandmother in an old fenland manor house which is full of secrets, friendly ghosts and children from another time. As Christmas approaches Tolly draws nearer to their world, and magically, is able to become part of it.	BBC Radio 4 Saturday Play
19 January 2000	Stay!	Georgia Pritchett	Sophie Thompson, Duncan Preston, Sheridan Smith	Lonely Lizzie runs a dog kennels. Her teenage daughter is aiming for sainthood. Tim the kennels handyman strives daily to avoid the small calamities that seem to seek him out. But romance is in the air when the new doctor arrives...	BBC Radio 4 Afternoon Play
9 April 2000 – 23 April 2000	Cousin Bette, The Poor Relation	Honoré de Balzac dramatised by James Friel	Alison Steadman, Leslie Phillips	Paris, 1838. The faithless Baron Hulot is in financial difficulties. His daughter needs a dowry and a husband, and his saintly wife has nothing more he can pawn. Cousin Bette proposes a solution to the family's dilemma and a bizarre revenge for her own betrayal.	BBC Radio 4
26 July 2000 – 30 August 2000	Coming Alive (series 2)	Jim Eldridge	Phyllis Logan, Karl Howman, David Holt	Light-hearted story of Terry "Silver Tongue" King, the ex-con released into the community. Terry King continues his battle to breathe new life into the Grove Hill Farm community centre. But will he face a return to jail after an assault charge? And will his tentative romance with social worker Sandra blossom?	BBC Radio 4
11 February 2001	Mary Queen of Scots Got Her Head Chopped Off	Liz Lochhead	Myra McFadyen, Gerda Stevenson, Siobhan Redmond, Bill Paterson, Daniel Brocklebank, Forbes Masson, Jon Glover	A darkly comic portrayal of the life and times of Mary, Queen of Scots. Premiered during the 1987 Edinburgh Festival, the play looks at Mary's legacy through the eyes of Corbie, a carrion crow who is her unseen attendant through life and death.	BBC Radio 4
24 June 2001	My Last Duchess	Robert Browning dramatised by Martyn Wade	Roger Allam, Emily Mortimer, Tim McInnerny, Robert Hands	Inspired by a fresco portrait of the Italian Duke of Este's first wife, who died young in suspicious circumstances, Browning wrote his poetic masterpiece My Last Duchess. This dramatisation solves the mystery posed by the poem.	BBC Radio 4 Classic Serial
21 September 2001	The Alien Sister (Note: Directed by Mark Brickman; Produced by Marilyn Imrie)	Judy Upton	Laura Sadler, Duncan Preston, Tessa Peake-Jones, Jon Glover	Darkly comic drama about what happens to the family of a teenage computer whiz when his elder sister suddenly returns home four years after she went missing. With the help of a chemistry set and some interrogation techniques cribbed off the internet, Connor sets out to prove she's an alien.	BBC Radio 4 Afternoon Play
19 October 2001 – 16 November 2001	Coming Alive (series 3)	Jim Eldridge	Phyllis Logan, Karl Howman, Sandra Voe	Ex-con Terry "Silver Tongue" King has reached a crossroads. Will he get to stay with Sandra or will he have to let go?	BBC Radio 4
24 August 2003 – 31 August 2003	The Book of Love	William Hazlitt's Liber Amoris dramatised by Martyn Wade	Tim McInnerny, Claire Skinner, Alison Steadman, Imelda Staunton, Julian Wadham, William Houston	The artist, admirer of Napoleon, theatre and literary critic and essayist William Hazlitt was 43 when he fell passionately and obsessively in love with Sarah Walker, his landlady's daughter, a young woman half his age. He became paranoid, jealous and totally single minded in pursuit of her.	BBC Radio 4 Classic Serial
24 September 2003	"Rumpole and the Primrose Path"	John Mortimer	Timothy West, Prunella Scales, Michael Cochrane, Nigel Anthony, Sophie Thompson, Joanna David, Carole Boyd	Rumpole exposes criminal practices at the nursing home where he has been sent to recuperate after a heart attack, which has left him in dire need of claret, cheroots and good company!	BBC Radio 4 Afternoon Play
1 October 2003	"Rumpole and the Scales of Justice"	John Mortimer	Timothy West, Prunella Scales, Michael Cochrane, Geoffrey Whitehead, John Rowe	When Rumpole is called upon to defend a senior member of the police force in court, his relish for the tragedy of Shakespeare's Othello, and his old acquaintances among the south London criminal fraternity prove very useful, and help him balance the scales of justice in favour of the oft maligned defence barrister.	BBC Radio 4 Afternoon Play
8 October 2003	"Rumpole and the Vanishing Juror"	John Mortimer	Timothy West, Prunella Scales, Bruce Alexander, Sophie Thompson, Marlene Sidaway, David Holt, Hetty Baynes	Rumpole's admiration for the integrity of the Old Bailey jury is legendary, but in this story he encounters a juror in a murder trial who has a very personal and very dramatic agenda.	BBC Radio 4 Afternoon Play
15 October 2003	"Rumpole Redeemed"	John Mortimer	Timothy West, Prunella Scales, Sophie Thompson, Bruce Alexander, Nigel Anthony, Nicholas Le Prevost, Karl Howman, Stephen Critchlow, Richenda Carey	Rumpole solves the conundrum of an ex-con who seems to have been redeemed, and one who evidently hasn't, and also seeks redemption for his own sins of omission at the Lysander health club! In passing, he also bestows redemption on several of his associates who, in various preposterous ways, are in dire need of it!	BBC Radio 4 Afternoon Play
2 January 2004	Lie Down Comic	John Mortimer	Sinéad Cusack, Tom Hollander	A stand-up comic finds himself befriending a beautiful, defiant and feisty woman author who is a fan of his, and who is dying, and raging against it. The two find themselves initially at odds, but eventually find support and affection in one another's company.	BBC Radio 4 Friday Play
11 September 2004	Hill of Rains	Colin MacDonald	Lorelei King, Bill Paterson, Stuart Milligan, Stuart McQuarrie, Sean Scanlan, Tracey Wiles	Cathy travels 3000 miles from Staten Island to Argyll, to look for the truth in an old story. She leaves her heart there, but discovers that real love always follows you home.	BBC Radio 4 Saturday Play
23 December 2004	Ancient and Modern	Sue Gee	Juliet Stevenson, Julian Rhind-Tutt, Matthew Marsh	Alison is one of London's many hidden, lonely people, working, coping, being brave. A chance encounter at a Christmas church service brings her a new understanding of what love means.	BBC Radio 4 Afternoon Play
21 March 2005 – 25 March 2005	Only in London (Note: Directed by Deborah Paige; Produced by Marilyn Imrie)	Hanan Al-Shayk dramatised by Shelley Silas	Tom Beard, Shappi Khorsandi, Helen Schlesinger, Nadim Sawalha, Nina Wadia	As a flight from Dubai touches down in London, three people from different corners of the Arab world are thrown together: beautiful, lost Lamis; the lively Moroccan Amira, and her new friend Samir, who, like her, loves not wisely but too well.	BBC Radio 4 Woman's Hour Drama
6 April 2005	Baggage: "Midsummer Mayhem"	Hilary Lyon	Hilary Lyon, Phyllis Logan, Adie Allen, Holly Wagner, Stuart McQuarrie	It's Edinburgh. It's Midsummer. Caroline is having a very bad time for the very first time, not helped by Fiona taking up residence in her bath and made much worse by Ruth just being Ruth.	BBC Radio 4
13 April 2005	Baggage: "Festival Flatmates"	Hilary Lyon	Hilary Lyon, Phyllis Logan, Adie Allen, Stuart McQuarrie, Moray Hunter	It's Edinburgh. It's the Festival. Our Celtic trio do an all-nighter, but what with dumped husbands, floundering new romances and half-drowned teenage boys – an early night might have been a better plan.	BBC Radio 4
20 April 2005	Baggage: "Halloween Havoc"	Hilary Lyon	Hilary Lyon, Adie Allen, Phyllis Logan, Peter Capaldi, Moray Hunter	At the castle's Halloween Ball, Caroline turns into Cinderella, and her ex-husband turns into a toad. Ruth and Fiona turn up to pick up the pieces.	BBC Radio 4
22 April 2005	Alias George Eliot	Martyn Wade	Deborah Findlay, Adrian Scarborough, Nicholas Le Prevost, David Collings	Marian Evans took the pseudonym George Eliot when she started her now famously successful career as a novelist. But she was dismayed to discover that someone else was claiming to have written her work. This is the story of her impostor, a certain Mr Joseph Liggins.	BBC Radio 4 Afternoon Play
27 April 2005	Baggage: "Fireworks and Funerals"	Hilary Lyon	Hilary Lyon, Phyllis Logan, Adie Allen, Holly Wagner, June Watson, Stuart McQuarrie	It's Edinburgh. It's Bonfire Night. Caroline is spoilt for choice; attending her boyfriend's mother's funeral or attending to Fiona's fugitive mum? Either way, its fireworks all round.	BBC Radio 4
4 May 2005	Baggage: "Christmas Crises"	Hilary Lyon	Hilary Lyon, Phyllis Logan, Adie Allen, Holly Wagner, Peter Capaldi, Gordon Kennedy, Stuart McQuarrie	It's Edinburgh. It's Christmas. It's a relaxed partner-free zone. Throw in a goose, a ghost and a garrulous whippet and you're all set. Unless of course, Fiona is in charge.	BBC Radio 4
11 May 2005	Baggage: "New Year, New Life"	Hilary Lyon	Hilary Lyon, Phyllis Logan, Adie Allen, Peter Capaldi, Stuart McQuarrie	It's Edinburgh. It's Hogmanay. It's time for resolutions. Caroline is determinedly moving on, Fiona may be moving back and Ruth is definitely staying exactly where she is.	BBC Radio 4
21 November 2005 – 25 November 2005	Constance	Julie Fraser	Joanna David, Martin Hyder, Maria Aitken, Geoffrey McGivern, Susan Wooldridge, Eric Loren, Tracy Wiles	Renowned 20th century florist Constance Spry was inspired by childhood walks in a bluebell wood in Ireland. Later, as a young bride, she created her first rose garden there, and escaped her loveless marriage by fleeing to England and a new life with her young son.	BBC Radio 4 Woman's Hour Drama
12 June 2006	The Stanley Baxter Playhouse: "Cold Call"	David Holt	Stanley Baxter, Pam Ferris, Sophie Thompson, Stephen Critchlow	Gordon Mackenzie is a wealthy pensioner with a penchant for drama and a sudden yen for a conservatory. Will his tyrannical cleaning lady agree to wield her duster over a million new window panes or will he find a new lady in his life?	BBC Radio 4
19 June 2006	The Stanley Baxter Playhouse: "First Impressions"	Rona Munro	Stanley Baxter, Colette O'Neil, Hilary Lyon, Gordon Kennedy	Charlie and Sylvia are lifelong friends. She depends on him in a thousand little ways and adores his talent for doing impressions. Charlie has loved her all his life, but he discovers that there are still some things he doesn't know about her.	BBC Radio 4
26 June 2006	The Stanley Baxter Playhouse: "Mortal Memories"	Liz Lochhead	Stanley Baxter	Jack and Nettie prepare to celebrate Burns night, and two very different people unite over an immortal memory.	BBC Radio 4
3 July 2006	The Stanley Baxter Playhouse: "Wheeling Them In"	Rona Munro	Stanley Baxter, June Watson, Sharon Maharaj, Meg Kubota, Mark Bonnar, James McPherson	Archie has been a hospital porter for 38 years. Suddenly everything he values seems to be in the balance, but in the end he reaps the rewards of years of kindness.	BBC Radio 4
13 July 2006	Kelso – Overdue South	Jules Horne; Music by Gavin Marwick	Eileen McCallum, Louise Ludgate, Billy Riddoch		BBC Radio Scotland Drama
19 July 2006	"Rumpole and the Teenage Werewolf"	John Mortimer	Timothy West, Prunella Scales, Felicity Montague, Nicholas Le Prevost, Philip Jackson, Matt Smith, Karl Johnson, Sean Baker, Ellie Beaven	Rumpole leaves London to defend a case in the Home Counties, where he meets up with Ben, a teenager accused of sending emails deemed to be sexually harassing, and of an actual physical attack on a girl.	BBC Radio 4 Afternoon Play
26 July 2006	"Rumpole and the Right to Privacy"	John Mortimer	Timothy West, Prunella Scales, Elaine Claxton, Anton Rodgers, Stephen Critchlow, Kim Durham, Joanna David	Rumpole leaves the Old Bailey to defend an editor of a local newspaper who is accused of breaching a successful businessman's right to privacy.	BBC Radio 4 Afternoon Play
28 July 2006	Baggage: "Midsummer Lovesick and Sickening"	Hilary Lyon	Hilary Lyon, Phyllis Logan, Adie Allen, Stuart McQuarrie	It's Edinburgh. It's February and it's freezing outside. Inside, the temperature is rising. Caroline and Simeon are loved-up; Fiona and Ruth are fed-up; three's company but four is definitely a crowd.	BBC Radio 4
30 July 2006 – 13 August 2006	Great Expectations	Charles Dickens adapted by Martyn Wade	Oliver Milburn, Angus Imrie, Jim Carter, Pam Ferris, Robin Weaver, Ken Campbell, Janet Suzman, Ellie Beaven, Milo Clare, Roger Allam, Christopher Benjamin, Harry Myers, David Thorpe, Sam Beazley, Anna Maxwell Martin, Adrian Scarborough, Stephen Critchlow	Young Pip is an orphan living with his shrewish sister and her kindly blacksmith husband. One Christmas Eve, he is surprised by a convict and forced to steal for him. This single good deed of Pip's leads him to the pursuit of expectations of wealth, a better position in life, and happiness; but he has many hard lessons to learn before he achieves that.	BBC Radio 4 Classic Serial
4 August 2006	Baggage: "Procreation and Procrastination"	Hilary Lyon	Hilary Lyon, Phyllis Logan, Adie Allen, Hilary MacLean, Natasha Lawrence, Stuart McQuarrie	It's Edinburgh. It's almost spring and there are armies of babies everywhere. Caroline grapples with incipient broodiness, her sister's colicky newborn and a major revelation from Simeon.	BBC Radio 4
11 August 2006	Baggage: "And So to Bath"	Hilary Lyon	Hilary Lyon, Phyllis Logan, Adie Allen, Stuart McQuarrie, Carolyn Bonnyman, Nicola Grier, Jack Docherty	It's Edinburgh, it's springtime and life is supposedly moving on. But with relocation in the air and a school reunion to be negotiated with Fiona and Ruth, Caroline doesn't know whether she is coming or going.	BBC Radio 4
18 August 2006	Baggage: "The Loneliness of the Long Distance Lover"	Hilary Lyon	Hilary Lyon, Phyllis Logan, Adie Allen, June Watson, Peter Capaldi	Caroline's ex-husband finds himself a new husband, Fiona's mother finds herself lost and Ruth gets lost trying to find herself.	BBC Radio 4
25 August 2006	Baggage: "Highland Fling"	Hilary Lyon	Hilary Lyon, Phyllis Logan, Adie Allen	Caroline's birthday in the wilds of the Highlands finds a newly sober Ruth reinventing herself, Fiona having a Highland fling and Caroline finding that her fling is well and truly flung.	BBC Radio 4
1 September 2006	Baggage: "Perpetual Emotion"	Hilary Lyon	Hilary Lyon, Phyllis Logan, Adie Allen, June Watson, Peter Capaldi, Roger May	At the Edinburgh Festival, the trio deal with a pair of pleading ex-lovers, a disconcertingly charming stranger and a life-and-death bedside vigil. Who needs drama on the Fringe?	BBC Radio 4
23 September 2006 – 30 September 2006	Lady Chatterley's Lover	D H Lawrence dramatised by Michelene Wandor	Lia Williams, Roger Allam, Robert Glenister, Lynn Farleigh, Jasmine Hyde, David Rintoul, Julian Rhind-Tutt	In Lawrence's classic exploration of the nature of sexual love, young beautiful Constance is married to Lord Clifford, wounded in the First World War and now unable to walk. Her life at Wragby Hall is bleak and lonely, until an encounter with Oliver Mellors changes everything.	BBC Radio 4 Classic Serial
12 August 2007 – 19 August 2007	The Card	Arnold Bennett dramatised by Jennifer Howarth	Ron Cook, William Ash, Philip Jackson, Jasmine Hyde, Daniel Weyman, Elizabeth Spriggs, Robin Weaver	Charting the rise and rise of Denry Machin in 19th century Bursley.	BBC Radio 4 Classic Serial
15 August 2007 – 22 August 2007	"Rumpole and the Reign of Terror"	John Mortimer	Timothy West, Prunella Scales, Christopher Benjamin, Lily Bevan, Michael Cochrane, Bruce Alexander, Shiv Grewal, Geoffrey Whitehead, Christopher Scott, Joanna David, Nigel Anthony	If one man can be counted on to fight injustice and insist on a fair and decent trial for everyone, whatever their circumstances, Horace Rumpole is he. So when beautiful Tiffany Khan learns that her husband has been arrested on suspicion of terrorism, she calls on him right away.	BBC Radio 4 Afternoon Play
5 December 2007	Baggage: "The Homecoming"	Hilary Lyon	Hilary Lyon, Phyllis Logan, Adie Allen, Roger May	Ruth may be in love, Fiona may be in labour and Caroline may wish she hadn't bothered coming home at all.	BBC Radio 4
12 December 2007	Baggage: "Family Matters"	Hilary Lyon	Hilary Lyon, Phyllis Logan, Adie Allen, Moray Hunter	Families and flats are being reconstructed all round. Caroline has a thoroughly modern dinner with her ex-husband and his new husband. She has to tackle an astonishing request.	BBC Radio 4
19 December 2007	Baggage: "The Regeneration Game"	Hilary Lyon	Hilary Lyon, Phyllis Logan, Adie Allen, June Watson, Moray Hunter, Nicola Grier	Caroline's adoption journey stalls when both her social worker Miriam and Fiona's baby April insist on arriving early.	BBC Radio 4
26 December 2007	Baggage: "Not Quite Part of the Plan"	Hilary Lyon	Hilary Lyon, Phyllis Logan, Adie Allen, Moray Hunter	In summertime, the living is far from easy. Caroline and Ruth struggle with Fiona's post-natal aggression, unaware that the worst is yet to come.	BBC Radio 4
2 January 2008	Baggage: "Human Doings"	Hilary Lyon	Hilary Lyon, Phyllis Logan, Adie Allen, Roger May, Nicola Grier	Ruth jumps off the wagon when her boyfriend's past catches up with him. Caroline falls at the final adoption hurdle. Fiona tries to get everyone to just stand still.	BBC Radio 4
7 January 2008	The Stanley Baxter Playhouse: "The King's Kilt"	Rona Munro	Stanley Baxter, John Guerrasio, Alison Peebles	A recalcitrant Highland kilt maker is faced with the task of producing a garment for George IV to wear on his first visit to Edinburgh in 1822.	BBC Radio 4
9 January 2008	Baggage: "Keep Right on to the End of the Road"	Hilary Lyon	Hilary Lyon, Phyllis Logan, Adie Allen, June Watson, Stuart McQuarrie	Caroline, Fiona and Ruth climb their biggest mountain yet, terrified that they may all fall over the edge.	BBC Radio 4
14 January 2008	The Stanley Baxter Playhouse: "Pasta Alfreddo at Cafe Alessandro"	Rona Munro	Stanley Baxter, Luisa Pretolani	An Italian café owner in Glasgow employs a little guile and cunning to defend the honour and the environment of his beloved native land.	BBC Radio 4
21 January 2008	The Stanley Baxter Playhouse: "Flying Down to Greenock"	Michael Chaplin	Stanley Baxter, Patricia Kerrigan	A centenarian Glaswegian, making his first ever flight, remembers life during the Blitz over Clydeside.	BBC Radio 4
30 January 2008	Life: An Audio Tour (Note: Directed by Philip Howard; Produced by Marilyn Imrie)	Jules Horne	Sandy McDade, Edith MacArthur, Lewis Howden, Alex Elliott	Jenny is trying to win Joe back after her disastrous affair. Her unusual strategy is to offer him an audio tour of the small Scottish town of Kelso.	BBC Radio 4 Afternoon Play
28 May 2008 – 29 May 2008	"The Antisocial Behaviour of Horace Rumpole"	John Mortimer	Timothy West, Prunella Scales, Michael Cochrane, Nicholas le Prevost, Roger May, Jillie Mears, Geoffrey Whitehead	ASBOs may be the pride and joy of New Labour, but they don't cut much ice with Horace Rumpole; he takes the old fashioned view that if anyone is going to be threatened with a restriction of their liberty then some form of meaningful legal procedure ought to be put in place.	BBC Radio 4 Afternoon Play
11 August 2008	Two Pipe Problems: "A Streetcar Named Revenge"	Michael Chaplin	Stanley Baxter, Richard Briers, Edna Doré, Jillie Meers, Tracy Wiles, Nickolas Grace, Susan Wooldridge	Inmates of the Old Beeches, a retirement home for elderly thespians, William and Sandy still nurse a certain affectionate animosity towards one another since they starred as Holmes and Watson in a 1960s television series.	BBC Radio 4 Afternoon Play
12 August 2008	Two Pipe Problems: "The Trusty Valet and the Crusty Butler"	Michael Chaplin	Stanley Baxter, Richard Briers, Tracy Wiles, Ellie Beaven, Lloyd Hutchinson, Geoffrey Whitehead	William and Sandy venture outside the Old Beeches to a movie set, accompanied by the intrepid care assistant Karen, as they take on the world of celluloid.	BBC Radio 4 Afternoon Play
31 August 2008	Your Only Man	Annie Caulfield	Ardal O'Hanlon, Dermot Crowley, Dara Ó Briain, Pauline McLynn, Lloyd Hutchinson	Brian O'Nolan was an Irish writer, columnist and civil servant who wrote novels such as The Third Policeman under the pen name of Flann O'Brien and popular satirical newspaper columns as Myles na gCopaleen, while at the same time working as a civil servant in Dublin under his real name. This play imagines what might have happened had the three of them got together on the day when O'Nolan was asked to leave his civil service post.	BBC Radio 3 Drama on 3
27 March 2009	The Stanley Baxter Playhouse: "Astonishing Archie"	Bill Paterson	Stanley Baxter, Bill Paterson, Maureen Beattie	When two brothers get together to plan the funeral of an old friend, the choice of music is a bone of contention – will it be Sinatra or Presley? A generation and a whole philosophy of popular music separate the brothers, and the choice they finally make is a heartwarming musical compromise.	BBC Radio 4
3 April 2009	The Stanley Baxter Playhouse: "Fife Circle"	Michael Chaplin	Stanley Baxter	Two elderly brothers meet at Waverley station and set out on a journey of discovery involving lost mothers, fathers, brothers and sisters, and learn just whom they really belong to.	BBC Radio 4
3 April 2009	The Bones Boys	Colin MacDonald	Mark McDonnell, Angus King	Poignant and funny drama following two 8th century monks trying to save holy relics from Viking marauders.	BBC Radio Scotland Drama
10 April 2009	The Stanley Baxter Playhouse: "The Man in the Garden"	Rona Munro	Stanley Baxter, Penelope Wilton, Bill Paterson	A lonely lady on a holiday in the remote West Highlands of Scotland finds herself falling in love with two members of the same family, born 60 years apart.	BBC Radio 4
27 April 2009	Two Pipe Problems	Michael Chaplin	Stanley Baxter, Richard Briers, Julia McKenzie, Joseph Mydell, Jillie Meers, Susan Wooldridge, Stephen Critchlow	Our two elderly thespian residents of the Old Beeches home for retired members of the acting profession must solve a mystery when a bridegroom inexplicably calls off a wedding.	BBC Radio 4 Afternoon Play
28 April 2009	Two Pipe Problems: "Have You Come Far?"	Michael Chaplin	Stanley Baxter, Richard Briers, Tracy Wiles, David Shaw-Parker, Julian Rhind-Tutt, Geoffrey Whitehead, Stephen Critchlow, Linda Broughton	Sandy appears in the honours list but a trip to Buckingham Palace to collect his award provides another mystery for the veteran sleuths to solve.	BBC Radio 4 Afternoon Play
19 May 2009 – 26 May 2009	"Rumpole and the Penge Bungalow Murders"	John Mortimer adapted by Richard Stoneman	Timothy West, Benedict Cumberbatch, Geoffrey Whitehead, Andy de la Tour, Emma Fielding, Jasmine Hyde, Stephen Critchlow, Karl Johnson	It is the 1950s, a short decade after the end of the war, and two war heroes have been shot dead. The only suspect is Simon Jerrold, the son of one of the victims, and he faces the death penalty. Defending him is deemed hopeless, so the case is handed to a novice. But the novice's superiors did not count on the tenacity and wit of the young and hungry Horace Rumpole.	BBC Radio 4 Afternoon Play
4 July 2009	Utz	Bruce Chatwin dramatised by Gregory Norminton	Jack Klaff, Pam Ferris, Sam Kelly, Daniel Weyman, Gregory Norminton, Dolya Gavanski	A British academic travels to 1960s Prague to research the art collection of Rudolf II and meets the eccentric and dogged porcelain collector, Kaspar Joachim Utz. From this encounter an extraordinary story of obsession and survival emerges. For years, Utz has protected his vast collection of Meissen figurines from Nazis, Stalinist ideologues and the demands of communist museum curators.	BBC Radio 4 Saturday Play
8 July 2009	Baggage: "Ashes to Auld Reekie"	Hilary Lyon	Hilary Lyon, Phyllis Logan, Adie Allen, June Watson, Moray Hunter	It is a year since Caroline's best friend, Fiona, died, but an unexpected visitor, a skinny dip in a Highland loch and an illicit kiss mean that scattering her ashes doesn't quite go according to plan.	BBC Radio 4
15 July 2009	Baggage: "Carping Diem"	Hilary Lyon	Hilary Lyon, Phyllis Logan, Adie Allen, David Rintoul, Nicola Grier	It's Festival time and Caroline is in love: great timing for her best friend Ruth to habitually invade her privacy, her toddler daughter April to be teething and her larger-than-life dad Hector to turn up unannounced.	BBC Radio 4
22 July 2009	Baggage: "The Father, the Mother, the Dead Friend and Her Lover"	Hilary Lyon	Hilary Lyon, Phyllis Logan, Adie Allen, David Rintoul, June Watson	It's autumn, but life in the flat is still hotting up. An unplanned dinner party sets the scene for some serious seduction tactics, Hector's secret is finally revealed and there is nothing cool about Caroline's temper.	BBC Radio 4
29 July 2009	Baggage: "Tales of the Unexpected"	Hilary Lyon	Hilary Lyon, Phyllis Logan, Adie Allen, David Rintoul, Moray Hunter, Nicola Grier	It's December in Edinburgh and the Christmas spirit is in short supply. The spirit of whisky, however, features heavily, as Ruth decides whether or not to risk falling off the wagon and Caroline and Roddy risk seriously falling out.	BBC Radio 4
5 August 2009	Baggage: "For a' that and a' that"	Hilary Lyon	Hilary Lyon, Phyllis Logan, Adie Allen, David Rintoul, Moray Hunter	It's Burns' night and passion and politics are to the fore. Tensions abound at the prospect of baby April spending the weekend with her birth father and Caroline frets over why her own father isn't spending the night at home.	BBC Radio 4
12 August 2009	Baggage: "You're a Long Time Dead"	Hilary Lyon	Hilary Lyon, David Rintoul, Adie Allen, Moray Hunter, June Watson	It's summer and all change all-round. Caroline struggles to come to terms with Ruth now being her dad's lover, and agonises over Roddy's shock proposal – the end of an era beckons.	BBC Radio 4
14 March 2010 – 4 April 2010	Clarissa: The History of a Young Lady	Samuel Richardson dramatised by Hattie Naylor	Richard Armitage, Oliver Milburn, Stephen Critchlow, Sophie Thompson, Alison Steadman, Deborah Findlay, Miriam Margolyes, Lisa Hammond, Adrian Scarborough, Julian Rhind-Tutt, Ellie Beaven	The beautiful young heiress Clarissa Harlowe is dangerously attracted by the wiles of the notorious libertine Robert Lovelace. Threatened by an imminent marriage arranged with the odious suitor her family have found for her, Lovelace persuades Clarissa to flee with him.	BBC Radio 4 Classic Serial
15 May 2010	The Jubilee Singers	Adrian Mitchell	Adjoa Andoh, Felix Dexter, Nadine Marshall, Tanya Moodie, Alibe Parsons, Clive Rowe, Ray Shell, Jonathan Pryce	Drama about the extraordinary Jubilee Singers of Fisk University, Tennessee, who in the years immediately after slavery brought their great 'Sorrow Songs' from the plantations to Europe.	BBC Radio 4 Saturday Play
22 June 2010	Two Pipe Problem 2010: "Right Old Charlie"	Michael Chaplin	Richard Briers, Stanley Baxter, Barry Cryer, Teresa Gallagher, Edna Doré, Jillie Meers, Joe Caffrey	Ageing, once-famous stand-up comic Charlie Fisher regales the inmates of The Old Beeches retirement home for members of the theatrical profession with a few too many very old gags, but when his joke book and a large sum of money go missing, resident sleuths Sandy and William have a few tough questions to ask of the inmates, the new odd job man, and Charlie himself.	BBC Radio 4 Afternoon Play
23 June 2010	Two Pipe Problem 2010: "The Memory Man Forgets"	Michael Chaplin	Richard Briers, Stanley Baxter, Teresa Gallagher, Geoffrey Whitehead, Julia Ford, Anne Reid	Billy Small is a rare talent; one of the few surviving "Memory Men" Music Hall variety acts who had total recall of a huge range of entertaining facts. Billy is 85, and after a trip home to his native Yorkshire, he returns to The Old Beeches totally devoid of any memory of who he is or of any of the amazing facts he used to be so proud to display.	BBC Radio 4 Afternoon Play
9 August 2010	"Rumpole and the Family Pride"	John Mortimer dramatised by Richard Stoneman	Timothy West, Benedict Cumberbatch, Elaine Claxton, Julian Wadham, Sophie Thompson, Joshua McGuire, Stephen Critchlow, Susan Wooldridge, Geoffrey Whitehead, Adrian Scarborough	We rejoin Rumpole and Hilda in the late 1950s, when they have been married for a year or two. Rumpole mingles with a branch of Yorkshire aristocracy remotely connected to Hilda's family when he represents a Lord in the Coroner's Court. Hilda's first cousin (once removed), Rosemary, lives with her husband, Richard, the 17th Baron Sackbut, in Sackbut Castle and Hilda and Rumpole are invited to Yorkshire when a body is found in the grounds of the castle.	BBC Radio 4 Afternoon Play
10 August 2010	"Rumpole and the Eternal Triangle"	John Mortimer dramatised by Richard Stoneman	Timothy West, Benedict Cumberbatch, Adrian Scarborough, Nigel Anthony, Michael Cochrane, Geoffrey Whitehead, Stephen Critchlow	When Rumpole and Hilda attend a concert performed by The Casterini Trio, Rumpole is surprised to be approached by Elizabeth Casterini – the trio's beautiful violinist. Rumpole falls for her charms. But then, the Trio's cellist, Tom Randall is murdered. Elizabeth's husband Desmond was supposedly suspicious of Randall's feelings for Elizabeth. And, since he owned the gun that was found by the body, Desmond is arrested. Flattered by Elizabeth's seductive pleas, Rumpole agrees to defend Desmond at the Old Bailey. But there, Rumpole's admiration for Elizabeth rapidly begins to wane.	BBC Radio 4 Afternoon Play
17 September 2010	The Stanley Baxter Playhouse: "The Porter's Story"	Rona Munro	Stanley Baxter, Gordon Kennedy, Siobhan Redmond, Stuart McQuarrie	Comedy based on Shakespeare's Macbeth. A porter tells his version of events that led to the murder of King Duncan, and reveals how his plans to help his master were foiled in a series of mishaps.	BBC Radio 4
24 September 2010	The Stanley Baxter Playhouse: "The German Pilot"	Rona Munro	Stanley Baxter, Sam Peter Jackson	Friedrich is a German pilot whose plane is shot down over a remote rural area in the west of Scotland. He is a prisoner of war, and initially local feelings against him are vitriolic; but he, like everyone in the community in which he finds himself, is a cattle farmer, and as his English improves, he forms strong bonds with his captors, and forges an unlikely friendship which, many years later, brings him back to Scotland.	BBC Radio 4
1 October 2010	The Stanley Baxter Playhouse: "In the Name of the Wee Man"	David Holt	Stanley Baxter, John Sessions	Tommy Lorne, one of Scotland's greatest early twentieth century comedians – how he became a star, touring sometimes to twelve venues a week, but pushed himself too hard, and in 1935 he collapsed before a show. At his funeral three thousand people turned out to say farewell – the biggest audience he'd ever played.	BBC Radio 4
29 October 2010 – 3 December 2010	The Bob Servant Emails (Note: Directed by Marilyn Imrie; Produced by Owen Bell)	Neil Forsyth	Brian Cox, Felix Dexter, Laura Solon, Lewis Macleod, Sanjeev Kohli	Bob Servant is retired and a little bit bored. When he starts getting spam emails, he decides to play the fraudsters at their own game and soon has them in the palm of his hand.	BBC Radio Scotland Comedy
20 March 2011 – 27 March 2011	The Lost World	Sir Arthur Conan Doyle dramatised by Chris Harrald	David Robb, Jasmine Hyde, Jamie Glover, Jonathan Forbes, Nyasha Hatendi	The hot-headed Professor Challenger claims that extinct species of animals are still to be found living on an isolated Amazonian plateau. Dr Summerlee, Lord John Roxton and the intrepid reporter, Edward Malone, find themselves committed to a journey of a lifetime.	BBC Radio 4 Classic Serial
6 May 2011	The Gobetweenies: "Meet The Millers" (Note: Directed by Marilyn Imrie; Produced by Gordon Kennedy)	Marcella Evaristi	David Tennant, Sarah Alexander, Finlay Christie, Phoebe Abbott, Stuart Milligan	A candid look at contemporary family through the prism of two North London siblings Lucy and Tom as they schlep between their determinedly hands-on divorced parents.	BBC Radio 4
13 May 2011	The Gobetweenies: "Sniffing Stevie and the Gym Horse"	Marcella Evaristi	David Tennant, Sarah Alexander, Finlay Christie, Phoebe Abbott, Stephen Critchlow, Morwenna Banks, Gordon Kennedy	Tom feels guilty about not wanting to be mates with a boy with a permanent snot bubble. His divorced parents confuse him about the morality of befriending losers. Meanwhile, a visit to a tattoo parlour gives Lucy a great idea about getting some attention.	BBC Radio 4
13 May 2011 – 3 June 2011	Sybil Unrest	Charlie Dore	Una McLean, Gavin Mitchell, Sanjeev Kohli, Stanley Baxter, Stirling Moss, Scott Hoatson	Octogenarian Sybil Law's comedy radio show celebrates canny, feisty, funny older people.	BBC Radio Scotland Comedy
19 May 2011	Macmillan's Marvellous Motion Machine (Note: Directed by Rosie Kellagher; Produced by Marilyn Imrie.)	Jules Horne	Scott Hoatson, Gavin Mitchell	Young Scots country blacksmith Kirkpatrick Macmillan is a man of ideas, like the velocipede – a clanking, pedalled contraption that's the ancestor of the modern bicycle. He cycled from Penpont to Glasgow and committed the world's first cycle crime in 1842.	BBC Radio 4 Afternoon Play
20 May 2011	The Gobetweenies: "Commendation and Competition"	Marcella Evaristi	David Tennant, Sarah Alexander, Finlay Christie, Phoebe Abbott, Tracy-Ann Oberman	Lucy gets inspired by art and creates her own Angel of the North London – but she is confused by Joe's refusal to take her to an exhibition of his own work.	BBC Radio 4
27 May 2011	The Gobetweenies: "Befriending Freddie"	Marcella Evaristi	David Tennant, Sarah Alexander, Finlay Christie, Phoebe Abbott, Emily Bruni, Oliver Dillon, Stuart Milligan	Lucy needs compensation for moving house every week...	BBC Radio 4
11 August 2011	Two Pipe Problems: "Here Doggie"	Michael Chaplin	Richard Briers, Stanley Baxter, Tracy Wiles, Jillie Meers, Honor Blackman, Anne Reid	The Old Beeches care-worker Karen has a new pet; Poppet, a rambunctiously badly behaved Scottie dog. Manager Mary issues an ultimatum – the pet goes, or you both go, and Sandy persuades another resident, a retired variety artiste called Norman Naylor who once had a dog-novelty act, to start training the dog on the nearby common. His wife Nelly, who also lives in the home, sees this as yet another opportunity for her husband to return to his old philandering ways. And one day, he doesn't return, and neither does Poppet.	BBC Radio 4 Afternoon Play
12 August 2011	Two Pipe Problems: "The Case of the Missing Meerschaum" (Note: Directed by Marilyn Imrie; Produced by Catherine Bailey)	Michael Chaplin	Richard Briers, Stanley Baxter, Geoffrey Palmer, James Fleet, Joanna David	William and Sandy are to appear at a Sherlock Holmes Convention, held at a hotel just around the corner from Baker Street. Sandy isn't keen but succumbs to William's desperate need to be in the spotlight once more. Sandy finds the display of 'fandom' absurd – the packed memorabilia stalls and one fan's observation that he thought he'd died years before. He also finds the political infighting threatening to tear the Society apart faintly ridiculous. But William is in his bombastic element, to such an extent that he has a very public and painful row with Sandy, who quits the convention and catches the Metropolitan Line back to the Old Beeches.	BBC Radio 4 Afternoon Play
18 September 2011	Glass Chair Chair Glass	Annie Caulfield	Russ Abbot, Harriet Walter, Allan Corduner, Emily Bruni, Hugh Ross	A play that imagines a day when Tommy Cooper met absurdist playwright Eugène Ionesco. It could have happened.	BBC Radio 3 Drama on 3
31 October 2011 – 6 November 2011	The Heat of the Day (Note: Directed by Tristram Powell; Produced by Marilyn Imrie)	Elizabeth Bowen adapted from the Harold Pinter screenplay by Tristram Powell and Honor Borwick	Henry Goodman, Matthew Marsh, Anna Chancellor, Tom Goodman-Hill, Teresa Gallagher, Daniel Weyman, Honeysuckle Weeks, Tina Gray, Nigel Anthony, Gemma Jones, Ben Baker	Stella is an intelligent widowed woman, living in London during the Second World War and working for a government agency. Although no longer in the flush of youth – she has a son in the army – she is still a sensuous, attractive woman and it soon becomes clear that she is the pawn in a macho battle between her existing lover Robert (who is possibly a spy and whose identity is in constant flux) and a creepy man called Harrison (an emotionally stunted counterspy).	BBC Radio 4 Classic Serial
1 March 2012	"Rumpole and the Man of God"	John Mortimer adapted by Richard Stoneman	Timothy West, Benedict Cumberbatch, Jasmine Hyde, Stephen Critchlow, Adrian Scarborough, Nigel Anthony	It's 1959, and Rumpole is faced with defending a clergyman accused of shoplifting who although he clearly did not commit the crime, is curiously reluctant to be cross examined under oath, where he would have to tell the truth, but save himself from being be defrocked. Meanwhile, Rumpole's fellow barrister and friend Frobisher, a confirmed bachelor, announces his engagement to a very merry widow, whom Rumpole seems to remember he has met somewhere before... And finally, Hilda, she who must be obeyed, drops a bomb of information which will have a profound effect on their marriage.	BBC Radio 4 Afternoon Play
2 March 2012	"Rumpole and the Explosive Evidence"	John Mortimer adapted by Richard Stoneman	Timothy West, Benedict Cumberbatch, Jasmine Hyde, Michael Cochrane, John Ramm, Geoffrey Whitehead, Nigel Anthony, Adrian Scarborough	It's 1960. Hilda's had a baby son, Nicholas. Rumpole, awash with flu, defends a safe-blower, and exposes the dubious dealings of a senior police officer. In so doing however, Rumpole breaches one of the codes of procedure in court, and finds himself in danger of losing his right to work in court. However, help arrives from the intervention of a gentleman of the press. Meanwhile, at Froxbury mansions, Rumpole forms a strong bond with his infant son in the watches of the night, when he talks over the intricacies of the case with him, and discovers that Hilda really does care about his career, and their future together.	BBC Radio 4 Afternoon Play
21 May 2012 – 25 May 2012	In the Van	Clare Bayley	Amber Agar, Matt Rawle, Felix Dexter	Recently promoted MI5 agent, Yasmin Zafiri is on her first stake out facing weeks, rather unglamorously, in a van, and with an unexpected supervisor. On Yasmin's first day in the MI5 surveillance van, she discovers her lover Jonathan is also on the case. They begin to eavesdrop on secret lives and test their own relationship.	BBC Radio 4 15 Minute Drama
6 July 2012	The Gobetweenies: "The Break-Up"	Marcella Evaristi	Mark Bonnar, Sarah Alexander, Finlay Christie, Phoebe Abbott, Tracy-Ann Oberman, Ophelia Davidson	A sly take on contemporary parenting looks at a divorced North London family through the prism of two go-betweening siblings. Lucy prepares to dazzle the world with her Rihanna-influenced take on the part of Nancy in the school production of Oliver! – but her mum, armed with a new parenting manual, prepares to do battle with her daughter's impermeable belief in her own genius. Meanwhile, son Tom is appalled by his hated fictional alter ego, cutesy Georgie. Maybe if he garrottes his mother's puppet version of himself, she'll get the hint? Dad is determined to steer him away from the merchandise and takes him to see a wrestling match instead.	BBC Radio 4
13 July 2012	The Gobetweenies: Series 2 Episode 2	Marcella Evaristi	Mark Bonnar, Sarah Alexander, Finlay Christie, Phoebe Abbott, Nicky Henson	Lucy has noticed the difference between her affluent mum, a children's fiction writer, and her broke dad who has just started a new job with Your Pets Painted in the Afterlife.com. She figures her dad he needs a proper Father's Day present, and her tuba has served its purpose of getting her into that good state school where she doesn't get bricks thrown at her head. So why not take a visit to the pawn shop?	BBC Radio 4
20 July 2012	The Gobetweenies: Series 2 Episode 3	Marcella Evaristi	Mark Bonnar, Sarah Alexander, Finlay Christie, Phoebe Abbott, Emily Bruni, Oli Dillon	Mimi and Joe are determined to be the best kind of divorced parents, supportive and as good as any traditional set up. Mimi has even salvaged her ex's best suit from the charity shop where it was meanly dumped by Joe's most recent ex-wife. But Joe keeps getting misdirected post from the fetish shop across the road and Mimi cannot keep her prying fingers away from a big fat intriguing parcel.	BBC Radio 4
27 July 2012	The Gobetweenies: "Under the Same Night Stars"	Marcella Evaristi	Mark Bonnar, Sarah Alexander, Finlay Christie, Phoebe Abbott, Emily Bruni, Oli Dillon, Stephen Critchlow, Daniel Boyd	Lucy is despairing about the future of the planet – until she meets a cute boy with a moped. But Tom is in a huff with his family and inventing imaginary parents because he is not allowed to see his best friend Freddy. When Freddy runs away it's left to Lucy to save the day. Thank goodness her mum never uses that porcini filled writing shed.	BBC Radio 4
3 August 2012	The Gobetweenies: "Sex, Guns and Frida Kahlo"	Marcella Evaristi	Mark Bonnar, Sarah Alexander, Finlay Christie, Phoebe Abbott, Juliet Cadzow	Mimi and Joe are in a state of conflicted liberal anguish because Lucy is growing up too fast. She wants a sexy Halloween costume to dazzle her boyfriend, but Joe talks her into going to a party dressed as Frida Kahlo. Meanwhile, Joe's wily mother sorts out her son's vindictive and most recent ex-wife, the radical rug designer.	BBC Radio 4
10 August 2012	The Gobetweenies: "The Next Story"	Marcella Evaristi	Mark Bonnar, Sarah Alexander, Finlay Christie, Phoebe Abbott, Stephen Critchlow, Doon Mackichan, Guy Paul	Tom and Lucy are furious they are not allowed a dog. Their parents say that when kids go between two households it's too complicated. But their mum and dad's love lives are even more tangled. After all, Tom has seen his parents kissing. So where does that leave their mum's new third husband, and the unstable pet shop owner their dad has been secretly dating?	BBC Radio 4
18 December 2012	"Rumpole and the Gentle Art of Blackmail"	John Mortimer adapted by Richard Stoneman	Timothy West, Benedict Cumberbatch, Jasmine Hyde, Stephen Critchlow, Adam Gillen, Adrian Scarborough, Nigel Anthony	In 1964, Rumpole returns to Oxford, where he studied law, to defend a young gardener, Peter Vernon, accused of blackmailing the Master of St Joseph's College, Sir Michael Tuffnell. Peter and Sir Michael had enjoyed a friendship that provoked rumours of homosexuality – still illegal in those days. Sir Michael has gone to the police alleging Peter was about to accuse him publicly of sodomy. Peter denies the charge and, indeed, is engaged to be married to his solicitor – a young woman by the name of Sue Galton. Rumpole sees through a plot to depose the Master and, sensing Peter's underlying honesty, he defends his client. But, in doing so, he's forced to re-assess the choices he's made in his career and his marriage to She Who Must Be Obeyed.	BBC Radio 4 Afternoon Play
25 December 2012	"Rumpole and the Expert Witness"	John Mortimer adapted by Richard Stoneman	Timothy West, Benedict Cumberbatch, Jasmine Hyde, Adrian Scarborough, Nigel Anthony, Daniel Weyman, Claire Skinner	It's 1964. Rumpole is asked to defend a GP, Dr Ned Dacre, who is accused of murdering his wife, Sally. Dr Ned Dacre's father is also a GP, Dr Henry Dacre, and it is he who asks Rumpole to take on the case. Dr Henry met Rumpole during the Penge Bungalow Murder trial and believes Rumpole's the man to get his son off this trumped-up charge. The plot thickens when the local pathologist, Pamela Gall, turns out to be an old flame of Dr Ned's. It seems that Pamela never forgave Dr Ned for dumping her and marrying Sally instead.	BBC Radio 4 Afternoon Play
13 January 2013	The Stanley Baxter Playhouse: "Hector's House of Windsor"	Colin Hough	Stanley Baxter, Phyllida Law, Pip Torrens	The Queen's Scots gillie aids her in a cunning plan to put her unruly prime minister and deputy firmly in their place when they visit her at Windsor and she invites them to join her on a canter round the park. Her own superior wisdom, cunning and diplomatic skills are revealed while Her Majesty's wise and wily old Scots gillie looks on and enters into the fun.	BBC Radio 4
20 January 2013	The Stanley Baxter Playhouse: "The Hat"	Colin MacDonald	Stanley Baxter, Thelma Barlow	Sheriff Finlay travels from Scotland to York for the funeral and cremation of his older brother William, with whom he didn't get on. When he gets there he is greeted with barely disguised hostility by William's widow. She tells him arrangements for the funeral are all made: it is going to be a Humanist service and the family heirloom fireman's hat, which was worn with pride by the brothers' grandfather, is in the coffin and is going to be incinerated along with William. Alistair decides to get the hat before the coffin makes its final journey into the flames. This will take him into dangerous territory, breaking into a funeral parlour at night and braving the criminal underworld to retrieve Grandad's hat and make a final peace with his brother.	BBC Radio 4
27 January 2013	The Stanley Baxter Playhouse: "The Spider"	Rona Munro	Stanley Baxter, Hugh Ross	At last, the true story can be told of Robert the Bruce and his encounter with that spider on the eve of battle with the English.	BBC Radio 4
12 February 2013	Dusty Won't Play	Annie Caulfield	Charlie Brooks, Jack Klaff, Vincent Ebrahim, Jonny Freeman, Danny Lee Wynter, Rasmus Hardiker	Dusty Won't Play is a reminder of the tangled paranoia of apartheid and the true story of Dusty Springfield's refusal to play segregated audiences in South Africa.	BBC Radio 4 Afternoon Play
15 March 2013	Mr Bridger's Orphan	Marcy Kahan	Malcolm Sinclair, Eleanor Bron, Tam Williams, Finlay Christie, Lizzy Watts, Will Howard, Rick Warden, Nicholas Murchie	Commissioned to commemorate the 40th anniversary of the death of Noël Coward, Mr Bridger's Orphan tells a surprising and little-known story from his life. It's 1968 and Coward is in Dublin to play the chief gangster in the film The Italian Job. But why has the urbane actor and playwright, in failing health, accepted the role? The play tells the story of how his involvement in the movie emerged from a significant encounter during Coward's dynamic and humane twenty-year Presidency of the Actors' Orphanage, revealing the down-to-earth man behind the sometimes waspish and rarefied public persona.	BBC Radio 4 Afternoon Play
18 October 2013	The Gobetweenies: Series 3 Episode 1	Marcella Evaristi	Mark Bonnar, Sarah Alexander, Finlay Christie, Phoebe Abbott, Valerie Cutko, David Troughton	Mimi has decided to branch into teenage fiction but, when the kids discover they are being used as copy, they mutiny. Lucy pretends to have an eating disorder and lies that Tom is now bed-wetting. But Mimi is set on her new writing venture. She's calling it The Gobetweenies and it's all about urban puberty.	BBC Radio 4
25 October 2013	The Gobetweenies: Series 3 Episode 2	Marcella Evaristi	Mark Bonnar, Sarah Alexander, Finlay Christie, Phoebe Abbott, Charlotte Ritchie, Emily Bruni	Mimi is having a hard time. She's freshly divorced and scared of her eggs going stale so she's decided to freeze them. But she didn't realise she had to give herself hormone injections. What's the divorced etiquette of asking an ex-husband to inject your torso? And how come she's not the favourite parent? Could it be because she was a complete failure trying to convince the mother of Tom's best friend that skateboarding was safe?	BBC Radio 4
1 November 2013	The Gobetweenies: Series 3 Episode 3	Marcella Evaristi	Mark Bonnar, Sarah Alexander, Finlay Christie, Phoebe Abbott, Dave Lamb	Lucy is driving rational science-loving Tom crazy with her passion for astrology. She tries to convince him by swishing her magnificent Leo hair at him. With her brother mercilessly mocking her gullibility, Lucy decides to read Tom's book, Exploring the Night Sky. When she discovers that starlight comes from extinct stars she has an existential crisis made worse by a recent visit to a ghoulish exhibition about grave robbers and dissectionists. Now she knows the awful truth – the sky is haunted and worse, she herself is actually mortal.	BBC Radio 4
8 November 2013	The Gobetweenies: Series 3 Episode 4	Marcella Evaristi	Mark Bonnar, Sarah Alexander, Finlay Christie, Phoebe Abbott, Charlotte Ritchie, Tracy-Ann Oberman	Joe had wanted to keep his new affair secret. His new girlfriend is twenty four and he now wishes he hadn't called Mimi's most recent ex-husband the Decrepit from Connecticut. Mimi is being badgered about bringing a 'plus one' to a wedding. She's in a state of post divorce fragility and begins to wonder if Joe still secretly longs for her. After all, he brought her lilacs on their wedding anniversary.	BBC Radio 4
15 November 2013	The Gobetweenies: Series 3 Episode 5	Marcella Evaristi	Mark Bonnar, Sarah Alexander, Finlay Christie, Phoebe Abbott, Stephen Critchlow	Joe has had to cancel a holiday with his girlfriend and it's Mimi's fault. So Mimi gets no back up when she wants to get the dog fixed and stop Lucy wearing latex. Their friend Bobby is fed up listening to them squabble because he has a real problem – his son Stevie is stonewalling him.	BBC Radio 4
22 November 2013	The Gobetweenies: Series 3 Episode 6	Marcella Evaristi	Mark Bonnar, Sarah Alexander, Finlay Christie, Phoebe Abbott, Charlotte Ritchie, Tracy-Ann Oberman	Tom's girlfriend Poppy has left him for Stevie – once a friendless snotball but now fit and much-fancied – but Tom is channelling Einstein to get his girl back, because Albert proved that linear time is a delusion and that everything that happens is still happening. And if that's true, Tom has no reason to move on.	BBC Radio 4
20 March 2014	"Rumpole and the Old Boy Net"	John Mortimer adapted by Richard Stoneman	Benedict Cumberbatch, Jasmine Hyde, Nigel Anthony, Ewan Bailey, Stephen Critchlow	We rejoin Rumpole and Hilda in 1964. Hilda is worried about the choice of school for their son, Nicholas. Hilda wants Rumpole to become a Q.C. to afford a decent education for Nicholas. Claude Erskine-Brown is also trying to take silk but he's distracted by the arrival in chambers of Rumpole's new pupil, Miss Phillida Trant.	BBC Radio 4 Afternoon Play
21 March 2014	"Rumpole and the Sleeping Partners"	John Mortimer adapted by Richard Stoneman	Benedict Cumberbatch, Jasmine Hyde, Nigel Anthony, Stephen Critchlow	After a legal ball in the Savoy Hotel, Rumpole and Hilda argue about Rumpole's drunken behaviour in front of Mr Justice Gwent-Evans. Rumpole can take no more of his wife and jumps out of their taxi. He intends to spend the night in chambers but finds Erskine-Brown in Equity Court, with Phillida Trant, "working late". Rumpole asks Phillida to help him with the defence of Hugo Lutterworth, who's accused of trying to kill the husband of his lover.	BBC Radio 4 Afternoon Play
4 July 2014	The Stanley Baxter Playhouse: "A Dish of Neapolitan"	Michael Chaplin	Stanley Baxter, Geoffrey Palmer	An old Army colonel and his one time batman reunite after many years at the scene of their greatest glories on the Italian front in World War Two.	BBC Radio 4
11 July 2014	The Stanley Baxter Playhouse: "The Showman"	Rona Munro	Stanley Baxter, Stuart McQuarrie, Tracy Wiles	In the year of our lord 1561, Mary Queen of Scots and the Protestant reformer John Knox clash in Edinburgh's old town over a harmless entertainment involving a wayward troupe of Scots comedians and song and dance acts.	BBC Radio 4
18 July 2014	The Stanley Baxter Playhouse: "Meg's Tale"	Rona Munro	Stanley Baxter, Maureen Beattie, Tracy Wiles	We hear how Robert Burns discovered the real story of Tam O'Shanter's big night out at Alloway Kirk - from the point of view of a young barmaid called Norah and her Aunty Meg, who finds herself the victim of a spell malfunction, becoming the horse whom Burns made famous in "Tam O'Shanter".	BBC Radio 4
9 December 2015	The Stanley Baxter Playhouse: "The Leaving of Barra"	Michael Chaplin	Stanley Baxter, June Watson, Scott Hoatson	In 1949, a young assistant director on Whisky Galore falls in love with a local girl on the island of Barra in the South Hebrides, where filming is taking place. Sixty six years later, his memories of that golden time come flooding back.	BBC Radio 4
16 December 2015	The Stanley Baxter Playhouse: The Flying Scotsman	Rona Munro	Stanley Baxter, David Mara, Beth Marshall	A whodunnit set on the great Flying Scotsman in the days of steam. A rookie Detective Constable and a world weary Detective Inspector combine forces with a recalcitrant train guard to solve a murder.	BBC Radio 4
23 December 2015	The Stanley Baxter Playhouse: Two Desperate Men	Colin MacDonald	Stanley Baxter, Joe Caffrey, Tom Borley	Two 1930s tricksters get their just deserts when they attempt to kidnap and hold to ransom a young lad who's learned a thing or two from the Wild West. Inspired by O. Henry's "The Ransom of Red Chief".	BBC Radio 4
6 January 2016	The Stanley Baxter Playhouse: "The Pool"	Michael Chaplin	Stanley Baxter, Geoffrey Palmer	Two old men with a shared love of the art of fishing have a shared past which haunts them both.	BBC Radio 4

Notes:

Sources:

- Marilyn Imrie's radio play listing at Diversity website
- Marilyn Imrie's radio play listing at RadioListings website

== Stage plays ==
Stage plays Directed by Marilyn Imrie
Date	Title	Author	Cast	Synopsis	Theatre Company	Notes
2006 –	Overdue South	Jules Horne	Eileen McCallum		Traverse Theatre, Edinburgh	
8 March 2007 – 10 March 2007	Lie Down Comic	John Mortimer	Alison Peebles, Sandy Nelson	A stand-up comic befriends a fan of his, who is dying. They find laughter and affection in one another's company.	Òran Mór, Glasgow	
25 November 2008 – 29 November 2008	The Bones Boys	Colin MacDonald	Angus King and Mark McDonnell	Two bickering 8th century Northumbrian monks flee north towards Scotland from a monastery under siege with a casket containing the precious bones of St Andrew	Òran Mór	Co-produced by BBC Radio Scotland, and jointly directed by Marilyn Imrie and Rosie Kellagher
12 October 2009	Elsie and Mairi Go To War	Diane Atkinson	Jennifer Black, Pauline Lockhart	This is a true story about best friends. Elsie Knocker was thirty and a lady with a past; and eighteen-year-old Mairi Gooden-Chisholm, who had just left school. They met on motorbikes two years before the outbreak of the First World War.	National Library of Scotland	
12 December 2009	Elsie and Mairi Go To War	Diane Atkinson	Jennifer Black, Pauline Lockhart	This is a true story about best friends. Elsie Knocker was thirty and a lady with a past; and eighteen-year-old Mairi Gooden-Chisholm, who had just left school. They met on motorbikes two years before the outbreak of the First World War.	Dovecot Studio Edinburgh	
4 August 2010 – 20 August 2010	Elsie and Mairi Go To War	Diane Atkinson	Pauline Lockhart, Clare Waugh	This is a true story about best friends. Elsie Knocker was thirty and a lady with a past; and eighteen-year-old Mairi Gooden-Chisholm, who had just left school. They met on motorbikes two years before the outbreak of the First World War.	Dovecot Studio Edinburgh	
28 April 2010	Blow Me Beautiful	Gabriel Quigley, Vicky Liddelle		Set in a small hairdressing shop on Edinburgh's Royal Mile, manager Raymond Bussell tries to keep things running smoothly while dreaming of a life of celebrity success. Things rarely go according to plan as Raymond struggles with an over-sexed assistant, a sullen receptionist, a vacant Saturday girl and a new recruit...only Dolly Parton keeps him sane.	Stellar Quines/Traverse Theatre, Edinburgh	
6 June 2011 – 11 June 2011	Daphnis and Chloe	Longus adapted by Hattie Naylor	Mark McDonnell, Kirstin McLean		Òran Mór, Glasgow	
–	English Eccentrics	Christine Croshaw	Prunella Scales, Edward Fox	An Anthology featuring Prunella Scales, with words and music		
