= Baggage (radio show) =

Baggage is a BBC Radio 4 situation comedy which by August 2009 had aired for 4 series, each consisting of 6 30-minute episodes. Series 1 aired from April 2005, Series 2 from July 2006, Series 3 from December 2007 and Series 4 from July 2009. It starred Hilary Lyon, Phyllis Logan, Adie Allen, and Stuart McQuarrie. It was written by Hilary Lyon and directed by Marilyn Imrie.

== Episodes ==
Series 1

1. "Midsummer Mayhem"
2. "Festival Flatmates"
3. "Halloween Havoc"
4. "Fireworks and Funerals"
5. "Christmas Crises"
6. "New Year, New Life"

Series 2

1. "Midsummer Lovesick and Sickening"
2. "Procreation and Procrastination"
3. "And So to Bath"
4. "The Loneliness of the Long Distance Lover"
5. "Highland Fling"
6. "Perpetual Emotion"

Series 3

1. "The Homecoming"
2. "Family Matters"
3. "The Regeneration Game"
4. "Not Quite Part of the Plan"
5. "Human Doings"
6. "Keep Right on to the End of the Road"

Series 4

1. "Ashes to Auld Reekie"
2. "Carping Diem"
3. "The Father, the Mother, the Dead Friend and Her Lover"
4. "Tales of the Unexpected"
5. "For a' that and a' that"
6. "You're a Long Time Dead"

== Notes and references ==
- Baggage at BBC Online
- Baggage at BBC Online (Archived Radio 4 page)
- Baggage at British Comedy Guide
