= The Book of Sheffield =

2019 anthology of stories about Shanghai

The Book of Sheffield is an anthology of ten stories from various English writers, edited by Catherina Taylor and published on 24 October 2019. It is the twelfth book of the Reading the City series, focused on stories from and about a certain city, in this case Sheffield in England.

== Content ==
- Introduction by Catherina Taylor
- Weaning by Helen Mort
- The Avenue by Margaret Drabble
- Like a Night Out in Sheffield by Johny Pitts
- Visiting the Radicals by Philip Hensher
- Born on Sunday, Silent by Désirée Reynolds
- The Father Figure by Geoff Nicholson
- How to Love What Dies by Gregory Norminton
- The Time is Now by Naomi Frisby
- Scrap by Karl Riordan
- Long Faiting/Try Saving Again byn Tim Ethcells
- About the contributions

== Review ==
Rochelle Barrand wrote for the Sheffield Telegraph, that the stories "explore various themes including class division, black history erasure and the post-child birth body." Damon Fairclough wrote for Northern Soul, that "conjuring a variety of Sheffields that are as gloriously true as the one that that exists in my head. Because in a city of valleys, a city of hills, there's always another view to take in." Meg Rowley wrote for The State of the Art, that "the stories are as eclectic as they are connected... you can dip in and out at your leisure and still feel cultured and complete."
