= The Advocates (TV series) =

- DVD cover
- Genre: Crime drama; Legal drama
- Written by: Alma Cullen; John Cooper
- Directed by: Peter Barber-Fleming
- Starring: Ewan Stewart; Isla Blair; Hugh Ross; Alison Peebles
- Composer: Daryl Runswick
- Country of origin: United Kingdom; (Scotland)
- Original language: English
- No. of series: 2
- No. of episodes: 6

Production
- Executive producer: Robert Love
- Producer: Murray Ferguson
- Production location: Edinburgh, Scotland, UK
- Running time: 60 minutes
- Production company: Scottish Television

Original release
- Network: ITV
- Release: 2 April 1991 – 23 March 1992

The Advocates was a Scottish legal drama, broadcast on ITV, that ran for two series between 2 April 1991 and 23 March 1992. The series starred Ewan Stewart and Isla Blair as the main protagonists, Greg McDowell and Katherine Dunbar. The first series was released on DVD on 12 April 2010. The second series was released on 20 September. A complete box set was released by Go|Entertain on 23 September 2013.

== Cast ==
- Ewan Stewart as Greg McDowell
- Isla Blair as Katherine Dunbar
- Hugh Ross as Archie Hoseason
- Alison Peebles as Vivien Lidell

=== Series 1 ===
- Stella Gonet as Alex Abercorn
- Michael Byrne as Campbell Reid
- Cal MacAninch as Milligan
- Shirley Henderson as Andrea
- Clive Russell as D.C.I. Ross
- Sean Murray as D.S. Sam Coutts

=== Series 2 ===
- James Fleet as Phillip Jackson
- Hugh Fraser as John Naismith
- Michael Kitchen as James McCandlish
- Siobhan Redmond as Janie Naismith
- Rachel Weisz as Sarah Thompson
- Finlay Welsh as Malcolm Davies
- Stuart Hepburn as D.C.I. Michael Smith
- Robert Carlyle as D.C. Murray

== Episodes ==
=== Series 1 (1991) ===
No.	Title	Directed by	Written by	British air date
1	"Episode 1"	Peter Barber-Fleming	Alma Cullen	2 April 1991
When a young prostitute dies of a deadly drug overdose, Dr. Joe Sangster, who has been treating her at the local health clinic, suspects foul play. In the growing climate of fear over drugs and AIDS in the city, his clinic faces closure due to a local campaign. He turns to young lawyer Greg McDowell for help, and McDowell sees the chance to make a name for himself.
2	"Episode 2"	Peter Barber-Fleming	Alma Cullen	9 April 1991
3	"Episode 3"	Peter Barber-Fleming	Alma Cullen	16 April 1991

=== Series 2 (1992) ===
No.	Title	Directed by	Written by	British air date
1	"Episode 1"	Peter Barber-Fleming	John Cooper	9 March 1992
McDowell is hired by a man accused of murdering his own wife. He suspects she may have been the victim of a serial killer, but the subsequent investigation begins to put his young girlfriend Sarah in danger.
2	"Episode 2"	Peter Barber-Fleming	John Cooper	16 March 1992
3	"Episode 3"	Peter Barber-Fleming	John Cooper	23 March 1992
