= Shelley Silas =

British playwright

Shelley Silas is a British playwright of Sephardi Jewish heritage, born in Kolkata. She grew up in Golders Green, North London. She is married to Dr Stella Duffy (OBE), psychotherapist, writer, campaigner. Shelley has an M.A. in Existential Coaching and is currently training in Gestalt Counselling. She facilitates workshops for the Royal Literary Fund, alongside her own writing and client work.

== Career ==
In 2002, she won a Pearson award and was writer-in-residence at London's Bush Theatre. Her stage plays are published by Oberon.

Her work for BBC Radio Four includes The Sound of Silence (short-listed for the 2003 Imison Award, creating and co-writing The Magpie Stories;, adapting Hanan al-Shaykh's novel Only in London and co-adapting Paul Scott's The Raj Quartet (with John Harvey).

She has also compiled and edited an anthology of short stories, 12 Days, published by Virago Press.

== Stage plays ==
- Shrapnel (1999)
- Falling (2002)
- Calcutta Kosher (2004)
- Mercy Fine (2005)
- Eating Ice Cream on Gaza Beach (2008)

== Radio plays ==
- The Sound of Silence (2002)
- The Magpie Stories (2002)
- Collective Fascination (2005)
- Ink (2005)
- Nothing Happened (2005, co-written with Luke Sorba)
- Molly's Story (2007)
- I Am Emma Humphreys (2009)
- The People Next Door (2010)
- Mr Jones Goes Driving (2010)
- Comfort Girl (2014)
- Dead Weight – Series 4 of Val McDermid's DEAD comedy crime series (2018)
- Dead Cert – Series 5 of Val McDermid's DEAD comedy crime series (2019)
- The Trial of The Well of Loneliness. (2020)

== Radio adaptations ==
- Calcutta Kosher (2002)
- Only in London (2005)
- The Raj Quartet (2005)
- Heat & Dust (2015)
- VR SHORT THE TURNING FOREST. Script for BBC R&D, Naked Prods, S3A, project in partnership to demonstrate immersive 3D sound. Selected for the Experimental Storytelling programme for the 2016 Tribeca Festival Hub, VR. Oscar Raby, director and visuals. Eloise Whitmore, soundscape. Jon Nicholls, original score. Subsequently, chosen for MIFF (Melbourne International Film Festival), Pi Centre Montreal, Toronto International Film Festival, Edinburgh Digital Film Festival, Raindance Film Festival, London, I Love Transmedia Festival, Paris. Sydney Film Festival 2017. One of Wired.com's eight favourite pieces at the Tribeca Film Festival. Achievement in Sound WINNER TVB Awards 2016. Chosen to launch Google Pixel and Daydream headset. Google have nominated this for best VR Experience in the 2017 Play Awards.

== TV ==
- The Barkers Treatment commission, Monkey Kingdom
