= Diane Atkinson =

British historian and writer

Diane Atkinson is a British historian and writer about women in history including the suffragettes, most recently for the centenary of women getting the vote in the United Kingdom, covering the detailed experiences of campaigning women in Rise Up, Women! The Remarkable Lives of the Suffragettes.

== Education and personal life ==
Atkinson is a graduate of the University of East Anglia. She married the artist Patrick Hughes in 1986.

== Career ==
Atkinson was a curator at the Museum of London and prepared their Suffragette exhibition in 1992.

Atkinson's book Love and Dirt about the marriage of Arthur Munby and Hannah Cullwick received reviews and Atkinson contributed to Upstairs Downstairs Love, a Channel Four drama documentary based upon it that was screened on 16 June 2008.

She narrated the stage presentation Elsie and Mairi Go To War at the 2010 Edinburgh Festival.

Atkinson also wrote about The Criminal Conversation of Mrs Norton, for Random House (2012). The legal case that George Norton brought against his free-thinking wife Caroline Sheridan for criminal conversation – adultery, that is – in 1836 was a scandal of the Georgian era, that drew in Lord Melbourne and other leading figures.

== Publications ==
- The Purple, White and Green: Suffragettes in London (Museum of London, 1992)
- The Suffragettes in Pictures (1996)
- Funny Girls: Cartooning for Equality, (Penguin, 1997) a book of cartoons about the Suffragette movement
- Votes for Women (1998).
- Love and Dirt (2004)
- Elsie and Mairi go to War (2009)
- The Criminal Conversation of Mrs Norton (Random House, 2012)
- Rise up, women! : the remarkable lives of the suffragettes (Bloomsbury, 2018)
