= Rumpole and the Primrose Path =

2003 book by John Mortimer

- First edition
- Author: John Mortimer
- Language: English
- Series: Rumpole of the Bailey
- Genre: legal
- Publisher: Viking Press
- Publication date: 2003
- Publication place: United Kingdom

Rumpole and the Primrose Path is an anthology of light hearted legal comedy short stories by writer John Mortimer. It is the 12th in a series based in part on his own past experiences as a barrister but also notable for their use of themes topical at the time each was published. It begins with the aged barrister Horace Rumpole marooned in a nursing home where he feels some shady business is going on. Several of the stories in the collection were adapted as part of a series of 45 minute radio plays starring real life husband and wife duo Timothy West and Prunella Scales. The short stories included in the work are:

- Rumpole and the Primrose Path (part of radio series)
- Rumpole and the New Year's Resolutions
- Rumpole and the Scales of Justice (part of radio series)
- Rumpole and the Right to Privacy
- Rumpole and the Vanishing Juror (part of radio series)
- Rumpole Redeemed (part of radio series)
