= Mary Queen of Scots Got Her Head Chopped Off =

1987 play by Liz Lochhead

Mary Queen of Scots Got Her Head Chopped Off is a 1987 play by Liz Lochhead. It explores the relationship between Elizabeth I of England and Mary Stuart. It is primarily written to be from a female point of view, and is considered to be Lochhead's most successful and critically acclaimed play. According to the BBC website:

"[ Lochhead ] has the character of Elizabeth enact masculine types of behaviour (even appearing on stage in men’s clothes) as a means of representing the exclusion of feminine behaviour in the political realm. Mary, by contrast, wields a more conventionally feminine power, exploiting her sexuality and the emotional vulnerability associated with her sex in order to get her own way."

It was first performed by the Communicado Theatre Company at the 1987 Edinburgh Festival. Mary Queen of Scots Got Her Head Chopped Off was broadcast as a radio play directed by Marilyn Imrie by BBC Radio 4 on 11 February 2001.

The National Theatre of Scotland toured a new production of the play across Scotland in 2009, directed by Alison Peebles who played Elizabeth in the original production. Mary Queen of Scots Got Her Head Chopped Off was revived again on stage in 2011, and toured to Lyceum Theatre, Edinburgh and Dundee Rep Theatre.

"Once upon a time, there were two queens on the wan green island, and the wan green island was split into two kingdoms. But no equal kingdoms."
