= Innocents (film) =

- Genre: Medical drama
- Written by: Neil McKay
- Directed by: Peter Kosminsky
- Starring: Tim Pigott-Smith; Madhav Sharma; Aden Gillett; Emma Cunniffe; Andy Snowden; Kate Redshaw; Adie Allen; Gillian Bevan; Roger Brierley
- Composer: Debbie Wiseman
- Country of origin: United Kingdom
- Original language: English

Production
- Executive producers: Michele Buck; Tim Vaughan
- Producer: Helga Dowie
- Cinematography: David Higgs
- Editor: Chris Ridsdale
- Running time: 90 minutes
- Production companies: United Television; Stonehenge Films

Original release
- Network: Channel 4
- Release: 1 October 2000

Innocents is a British television medical drama film, written by Neil McKay and directed by Peter Kosminsky, first broadcast on Channel 4 on 1 October 2000 as part of Channel 4's Doctors on Trial season. The film, based upon the Bristol heart scandal of the 1980s and 1990s, stars Tim Pigott-Smith as James Wisheart and Madhav Sharma as Janarda Dhasmana, who whilst working together to perform 33 arterial-switch operations incurred a mortality rate of 66% among patients under a month old, and 43% among those over a month old. Aden Gillett co-stars as Steve Bolsin, the whistleblower whose testimony first brought the scandal to public attention.

The film broadcast in the United States as part of PBS' Masterpiece Theatre strand on 6 May 2002. The New York Times' review of the film commented that "Neil McKay's script captures the intelligent persuasiveness of the surgeons and the twisted rationales employed by fairly good people doing bad things. Obviously there is no shortage of human drama in this story, and the scenes of parents reacting to news about their babies are almost painfully real. Eventually the confused drama within the infirmary becomes gripping, too." The film was nominated for an international Emmy Award in 2001.

== Cast ==
- Tim Pigott-Smith as James Wisheart
- Madhav Sharma as Janardan Dhasmana
- Aden Gillett as Steve Bolsin
- Emma Cunniffe as Sharon Peacock
- Andy Snowden as Daryl Peacock
- Kate Redshaw as Julie Johnson
- Adie Allen as Helen Rickard
- Gillian Bevan as Alison Hayes
- Roger Brierley as Dr. John Roylance
- Silas Carson as Ash Pawade
- Oliver Cotton as Mike Angelini
- Jonathan Cullen as Dr. Rob Martin
- Glyn Grimstead as Trevor Jones
- Joanne Howarth as Rosemary Jones
- Allin Kempthorne as Paul Bradley
- Dawn McDaniel as Kay Armstrong
- Darren Morfitt as William Booth
- Pooky Quesnel as Michaela Willis
- Darren Strange as Steve Johnson

== Reception ==
The film received mixed responses. Phil Hall from Film Threat gave the film a 2.5 out of 5, calling it "[s]evere miscasting ruins what could have been a new indie classic".
