= The Wife of Usher's Well =

Traditional song

- Ballad
- Catalogue: Child Ballad 79
- Genre: Folk

"The Wife of Usher's Well" is a traditional ballad, catalogued as Child Ballad 79 and number 196 in the Roud Folk Song Index. An incomplete version appeared in Sir Walter Scott's "Minstrelsy of the Scottish Border" (1802). It is composed of three fragments. They were notated from an old woman in West Lothian. The Scottish tune is quite different from the English tune, and America produced yet another tune. William Motherwell also printed a version in "Minstrelsy Ancient and Modern" (1827). Cecil Sharp collected songs from Britain but had to go the Appalachian Mountains to locate this ballad. He found 8 versions and 9 fragments. In the first half of the twentieth century many more versions were collected in America.

The ballad concerns a woman from Usher's Well, who sends her three sons away, to school in some versions, and a few weeks after learns that they had died. The woman grieves bitterly for the loss of her children, cursing the winds and sea.

"I wish the wind may never cease,
Nor flashes in the flood,
Till my three sons come home to me,
In earthly flesh and blood."

The song implicitly draws on an old belief that one should mourn a death for a year and a day, for any longer may cause the dead to return; it has this in common with the ballad "The Unquiet Grave". When, around Martinmas, the children return to their mother they do so as revenants, not, as she hoped, "in earthly flesh and blood", and it is a bleak affair. They wear hats made of birch. The children are dead but wear birch wood. The symbolism here is unclear. Conventionally birch protects the living from the dead not the other way round. The birch comes from a tree that grows at the gates of Paradise. The mother expects a joyous reunion, in some versions preparing a celebratory feast for them, which, as subjects of Death, they are unable to eat. They consistently remind her that they are no longer living; they are unable to sleep as well and must depart at the break of day.

"The cock doth craw, the day doth daw,
The channerin worm doth chide;
Gin we be mist out o our place,
A sair pain we maun bide."

The most popular versions in America have a different tone and an overtly religious nature. They return at Christmas rather than Martinmas, and happily return to their Savior at the end. Indeed, Jesus may speak to the Wife at the end, telling her she had nine days to repent; she dies at that time and is taken to heaven.

The ballad has much in common with some variants of "The Clerk's Twa Sons O Owsenford". The Christmas appearance has been cited to explain why, in that ballad, the two sons are executed, but their father tells their mother they will return at Christmas; the father may mean they will return as ghosts.

== Recordings ==
Buell Kazee recorded the song as "Lady Gay" in 1928.

Recorded by John Jacob Niles in 1941 on Victor 2173-A [Digitised version on archive.org]

Recorded by Jean Ritchie on "Traditional British Ballads vol 2" (Folkways Records) in 1961

Recorded by Peggy Seeger in 1962 on "A Song For you and Me" (Prestige)

Recorded by Hedy West in 1965 on the album "Old Times and Hard Times"

Recorded by Ewan MacColl in 1967 on the album "The Long Harvest Vol 5"

The Chieftains recorded it as "Three Little Babes" on "Further Down the Old Plank Road".

A version of the ballad by folk-rock pioneers Steeleye Span can be heard on their 1975 album All Around My Hat. Andreas Scholl performs the song on the album Wayfaring Stranger: Folksongs (2001), and Karine Polwart on her album Fairest Floo'er (2007). Versions appear on the Bellowhead album Broadside and on the Runa album Current Affairs.

Recorded by Cerys Hafana in 2023.

== Adaptations ==
In autumn 2010, Quondam toured an Arts Council England-supported "new play with songs" called The Wife of Usher's Well to 27 venues. Inspired by the border ballad, this reprised the historic text in a new setting of a mother's losing her son in the war in Afghanistan. The writer was Jules Horne and the cast was Helen Longworth, Danny Kennedy, Ruth Tapp and Andrew Whitehead.

In July 2018, as part of the SHEnyc festival, an adaptation written by Sophie Netanel was performed in the Connelly Theater, New York.

Joanna Newsom recorded a version of this song calling it 'Three Little Babes', on her album The Milk Eyed Mender.
