= Communicating Doors =

Play written by Alan Ayckbourn (1994)

- Written by: Alan Ayckbourn
- Characters: Poopay; Julian; Reece; Ruella; Harold; Jessica
- Original language: English
- Subject: Time travel, changing history
- Genre: Comedy/Thriller
- Setting: A hotel suite, in 1974, 1994 and 2014

Premiere
- Date premiered: 2 February 1994
- Place premiered: Stephen Joseph Theatre (Westwood), Scarborough
- Official website

Communicating Doors is a play written in 1994 by Alan Ayckbourn. The setting is a hotel suite that moves through time from 1974 to 2014. The central character, Poopay, must save herself from the murderous Julian by preventing the murders of Reece's two wives.

== Cast and characters ==
Characters

- Reece (A businessman, aged 30 & 70)
- Jessica (His first wife, aged 25 & 45)
- Ruella (His second wife, aged 45)
- Julian (His business associate, aged 45 & 65)
- Poopay (Phoebe) (A prostitute, aged 33)
- Harold (A house detective, aged 35 & 55)

Character	Stephen Joseph Theatre (Original Production) (1992)	Gielgud Theatre (1995)	Savoy Theatre (1996)	Variety Arts Theatre (off-Broadway) (1998)	Menier Chocolate Factory (2015)
Poopay/Phoebe	Adie Allen	Adie Allen	Jane Slavin	Mary-Louise Parker	Rachel Tucker
Julian	Richard Durden	Ken Bones	Ken Bones	Gerrit Graham	David Bamber
Reece	John Hudson	Laurence Kennedy	Laurence Kennedy	Tom Backett	Robert Portal
Ruella	Liz Crowther	Julia McKenzie	Angela Thorne	Patricia Hodges	Imogen Stubbs
Harold	Nick Stringer	John Arthur	John Arthur	David McCallum	Matthew Cottle
Jessica	Sarah Markland	Sarah Markland	Eleanor Tremain	Candy Buckley	Lucy Briggs-Owen
