= Another Time, Another Place (1983 film) =

- Directed by: Michael Radford
- Screenplay by: John Francis Lane; Michael Radford
- Based on: Another Time, Another Place by Jessie Kesson
- Produced by: Simon Perry
- Starring: Phyllis Logan; Giovanni Mauriello; Denise Coffey
- Cinematography: Roger Deakins
- Edited by: Tom Priestley
- Music by: John McLeod
- Production companies: Associated-Rediffusion Television; Channel Four Films; The Scottish Arts Council; Umbrella
- Distributed by: Cinegate; Rediffusion
- Release dates: May 1983 (Cannes Film Festival); July 1983 (UK)
- Running time: 118 minutes
- Country: United Kingdom
- Language: English
- Budget: £500,000

Another Time, Another Place is a 1983 British drama film directed by Michael Radford and starring Phyllis Logan, Giovanni Mauriello and Denise Coffey. The screenplay was based on the 1983 novel by Jessie Kesson.

== Plot ==
In Scotland in 1943 during World War II, Janie is a young Scottish housewife married to Dougal, who is 15 years older. Participating in a war rehabilitation program, the couple take in three Italian prisoners of war to work on their farm. Janie soon falls in love with one of the three, Luigi. She begins a secret relationship with Luigi that is doomed from the start.

== Cast ==
- Phyllis Logan as Janie
- Giovanni Mauriello as Luigi
- Denise Coffey as Meg
- Tom Watson as Finlay
- Gianluca Favilla as Umberto
- Gregor Fisher as Beel
- Paul Young as Dougal
- Claudio Rosini as Paolo
- Jennifer Piercey as Kirsty
- Yvonne Gilan as Jess
- Carol Ann Crawford as Else
- Ray Jeffries as Alick
- Scott Johnston as Jeems
- Nadio Fortune as Antonio
- David Mowat as Randy Bob
- Colin Campbell as accordionist
- John Francis Lane as farmer
- Corrado Sfogli as Raffaello
- Peter Finlay as officer
- Stephen Gressieux as prisoner of war
