= Jules Horne =

Scottish playwright, radio dramatist and writer

- Born: 1963 (age 62–63); Hawick, Scotland
- Occupations: playwright, radio dramatist and fiction writer

Jules Horne (born 1963) is a Scottish playwright, radio dramatist and fiction writer.

Jules Horne was born in Hawick, Scotland, and lived in Bonn, Bern and Reading before returning to the Scottish Borders. Following a German degree at Oxford, she worked in Germany and Switzerland as a translator, editor and BBC Radio journalist. She returned to the UK in 2000 to write full-time.

Jules was awarded a Scottish Arts Council Bursary in 2001 and the National Library of Scotland Robert Louis Stevenson Memorial Award in 2002.

Her first full-length play, Gorgeous Avatar, was performed by the Traverse Theatre, Edinburgh in 2006, and in Japanese at AI Hall, Itami, Osaka in 2007, and by Heidelberg University's Schauspielgruppe Anglistik in 2008. Plays for radio include Left at the Lights (BBC Radio Scotland), Inner Critic (BBC 7), A Place in the Rain (BBC Radio 4), Overdue South (BBC Radio Scotland), Life: An Audio Tour (BBC Radio 4), Small Blue Thing (BBC Radio Scotland) and Macmillan's Marvellous Motion Machine (BBC Radio 4). She was the Scottish Arts Council's Virtual Writing Fellow for Dumfries and Galloway from 2005 to 2008, and has taught playwriting in schools as part of the Traverse's Class Act project. She teaches creative writing as an Associate Lecturer at Open University.

Her play Allotment for Nutshell Theatre won a Scotsman Fringe First at the 2011 Edinburgh Festival Fringe, and the 2011 Fringe Award by the Centre for Sustainable Practice in the Arts.

== Radio Plays ==
Radio Plays written by Jules Horne
Date first broadcast	Play	Director	Cast	Synopsis Awards	Station Series
6 April 2005	Days of Reckoning: The Christmas Chair		Read by Julie Austin	An old man with Alzheimer's is brought home to spend the festive season with his family.	BBC Radio 4 Afternoon Reading
25 December 2005	The Hidden Gift: Left at the Lights	David Ian Neville			BBC Radio Scotland Drama
5 April 2006	Fresh Blood: Inner Critic	David Ian Neville		There's a carping, spiteful wee voice in Danni's ear crushing her spirit. Imaginary or real, can Danni get rid of her all too vicious inner critic?	BBC Radio 7
8 June 2006	Island Blue: A Place in the Rain	David Ian Neville	Sarah Collier, Rose McBain, Lucy Paterson and Lesley Hart	Self-made millionaire, Bren, finds more questions than answers in the island's solitude. Shonagh wants to get on the property ladder but will the in-comer spoil her dream?	BBC Radio 4 Woman's Hour Drama
13 July 2006	Kelso – Overdue South	Marilyn Imrie	Eileen McCallum, Louise Ludgate and Billy Riddoch; Music by Gavin Marwick		BBC Radio Scotland Drama
30 January 2008	Life: An Audio Tour	Philip Howard	Sandy McDade, Edith MacArthur, Lewis Howden and Alex Elliott	Jenny is trying to win Joe back after her disastrous affair. Her unusual strategy is to offer him an audio tour of the small Scottish town of Kelso.	BBC Radio 4 Afternoon Play
14 May 2008	Small Blue Thing	Rosie Kellagher	Clare Waugh, Molly Innes, Isla Cowan and James Mackenzie	An eerie tale of childhood jealousy and possession where a small glass marble seems to have a powerful hold over one young woman's life.	BBC Radio Scotland Drama
19 May 2011	Macmillan's Marvellous Motion Machine	Rosie Kellagher	Scott Hoatson, John Kazek, Gabriel Quigley, Gavin Mitchell, Isabella Jarrett and Leo MacNeill	Young Scots country blacksmith Kirkpatrick Macmillan is a man of ideas, like the velocipede – a clanking, pedalled contraption that's the ancestor of the modern bicycle. He cycled from Penpont to Glasgow and committed the world's first cycle crime in 1842.	BBC Radio 4 Afternoon Play

== Theatre ==
Stage plays written by Jules Horne
Date	Title	Director	Cast	Synopsis	Company / Theatre	Notes
17 May 2001 – 2 June 2001	Borders Fusion: Pawkie Paitterson's Auld Grey Yaud	Stewart Aitken	Simon Crouch, Matthew Burgess and Kathleen Quinn	Based on a traditional poem, which finds an ageing horse setting out its last will and testament.	Cross Country Theatre Company Tour: 17 May 2001 / Denholm Village Hall; 2 June 2001 / The Wynd Theatre Melrose	
7 June 2001 – 9 June 2001	Borders Fusion: Pawkie Paitterson's Auld Grey Yaud	Stewart Aitken	Simon Crouch, Matthew Burgess and Kathleen Quinn	Based on a traditional poem, which finds an ageing horse setting out its last will and testament.	Traverse Theatre, Edinburgh	
2002 –	Bill McLaren Was My PE Teacher	Judy Steel			Rowan Tree Theatre	
9 May 2006 – 20 May 2006	Gorgeous Avatar	Philip Howard	Pauline Knowles, Una McLean, Patrick Hoffman and John Kazek	Amy enjoys her isolation in a small Borders town, glued to her laptop and conducting her work, shopping and a long-distance relationship via the internet – but the real world catches up with her when her American internet beau gets on a plane to visit.	Traverse Theatre, Edinburgh	
23 May 2006 – 10 June 2006	Gorgeous Avatar	Philip Howard	Pauline Knowles, Una McLean, Patrick Hoffman and John Kazek	Amy enjoys her isolation in a small Borders town, glued to her laptop and conducting her work, shopping and a long-distance relationship via the internet – but the real world catches up with her when her American internet beau gets on a plane to visit.	Tour: 23 May 2006 / Yetholm Wauchope Hall; 24 May 2006 / Galashiels Volunteer Hall; 25 May 2006 / Carlops Village Hall; 29 May 2006 / Dumfries Theatre Royal; 31 May 2006 / Ballachulish Village Hall; 2 June 2006 / Stornoway, Isle of Lewis An Lanntair; 5 June 2006 / Achiltibuie Coigach Community Hall; 6 June 2006 / Ullapool Macphail Theatre; 8 June 2006 / Strathpeffer Pavilion; 10 June 2006 / Isle of Skye Sabhal Mor Ostaig	
2006 –	Overdue South	Marilyn Imrie	Eileen McCallum, Louise Ludgate and Billy Riddoch		Traverse Theatre, Edinburgh	
8 May 2009 – 24 May 2009	The Devil on Wheels	Kate Nelson	Fraser Boyle	Monologue celebrating the life and heritage of Kirkpatrick Macmillan, the Dumfriesshire blacksmith who invented the pedal bicycle, centres on Macmillan's appearance in a Glasgow court where he was charged with dangerous driving and knocking down a young girl while riding his new pedal bicycle through the Gorbals in 1842.	Nutshell Theatre Tour Dumfries & Galloway tour, May 2009: 8 May 2009 / Penpont Primary School; / Festival Café at DG One Dumfries; / Robert Burns Centre Film Theatre Dumfries; 23–24 May 2009 / Drumlanrig Castle	Created for the Scottish Forestry Commission for The World Mountain Bike Conference and Original Bicycle Festival
8 October 2010 – 14 November 2010	The Wife of Usher's Well	Stefan Escreet	Helen Longworth, Danny Kennedy, Andrew Whitehead and Ruth Tapp		Quondam Theatre Tour: 8 October 2010 / Ferguson Hall Belford, Northumberland; 9 October 2010 / Pegswood Community Project Northumberland; 13 October 2010 / Bishop Auckland Town Hall; 14 October 2010 / Eastriggs Social Club; 15–16 October 2010 / Dumfries & Galloway Arts Association; 19 October 2010 / The Brindley Runcorn; 20 October 2010 / Residency Heart of Hawick; 21 October 2010 / Heart of Hawick; 22 October 2010 / Bowhill Theatre Selkirk, Scottish Borders; 23 October 2010 / The Wynd Theatre Melrose; 26 October 2010 / Tithe Barn Carlisle; 27 October 2010 / Plumbland Village Hall Cumbria; 28 October 2010 / Ireby Globe Hall Cumbria; 29 October 2010 / Brigham Memorial Hall Cumbria; 2010 / Haile Village Hall Cumbria; 2 November 2010 / Talbot Theatre Whitchurch, Shropshire; 3 November 2010 / Bowes & Gilmonby Parish Hall Durham; 4 November 2010 / Appleby-in-Westmorland Public Hall; 5 November 2010 / Lacey Thompson Hall Hallbankgate; 6 November 2010 / Askham Village Hall Cumbria; 7 November 2010 / Nicholforest Village Hall Penton Cumbria; 10 November 2010 / Anslow Village Hall; 11 November 2010 / Hurley Village Hall Warwickshire; 12 November 2010 / Gilbert Sheldon Hall Stanton, Staffordshire; 13 November 2010 / Florence Nightingale Memorial Hall Holloway, Derbyshire; 14 November 2010 / St Anne's Church Hall Wendover	Supported by Arts Council England
8 August 2011 – 28 August 2011	Allotment	Kate Nelson	Pauline Goldsmith and Nicola Jo Cully		Nutshell Theatre / Assembly: Inverleith Allotments, Edinburgh	
3 August 2012 – 26 August 2012	Thread	Kate Nelson	Mary Gapinski, Claire Dargo and Stephen Docherty		Nutshell Theatre	
20 September 2013 – 19 October 2013	Thread	Kate Nelson	Gowan Calder, Nicola Jo Cully and Stephen Docherty		Tour: 20–21 Sept / Tron Theatre, Glasgow; 25 Sept / Brunton Theatre, Musselburgh; 28 Sept / Wigtown Book Festival, Wigtown; 8 Oct / New Pitsligo Hall, New Pitsligo; 11 Oct / Stracathro Hall, by Edzell; 12 Oct / Crathes Hall, Crathes; 17 Oct / Birnam Arts Centre, Birnam; 18 Oct / Paisley Arts Centre, Paisley; 19 Oct / Corrie Hall, Isle of Arran	
27 January 2018	Handfast	Kate Nelson	Nicola Jo Cully, Joanna Holden, Robin Laing, Victoria Liddelle, Sandy Nelson and Mark McDonnell		Nutshell Theatre MacArts Centre, Galashiels	Performed script-in-hand as a work-in-progress, the first time the play was heard by an audience.
28 June 2018 – 30 June 2018	Handfast	Kate Nelson	Joanna Holden, Stephen Doherty, Pauline Goldsmith, Sandy Nelson, Mary Gapinski and Valentine Hanson		Nutshell Theatre & The Byre Theatre The Byre Theatre, St Andrews	
3 August 2018 – 26 August 2018	Handfast	Kate Nelson	Joanna Holden, Stephen Doherty, Pauline Goldsmith, Sandy Nelson, Mary Gapinski and Valentine Hanson		Nutshell Theatre & The Byre Theatre Summerhall, Edinburgh	

== Short stories ==
- Agnus Dei, Macalllan Shorts 1 Polygon, 1998 ISBN 978-0-7486-6245-6
- Life Kit #1, Franklin's Grace Fish, 2002 ISBN 978-0-9542586-0-3
- Radar Bird, Macallan Shorts V, Polygon, 2003 ISBN 978-0-7486-6329-3
- The Case Against Wings, Chapman 2004 ISBN 978-1-903700-10-5
- Nanonovels, Product magazine, 2004–2008 ISSN 1468-9901
- Bill McLaren Was My PE Teacher

== Journalism ==
- Open University learning is a joy – Jules Horne, The Guardian, 18 June 2010
