= Aden Gillett =

British actor (born 1958)

- Born: John Aden Gillett; 8 November 1958 (age 67); Aden, Yemen
- Occupation: Actor
- Years active: 1985–present
- Spouse: Sara Stewart
- Children: 2

John Aden Gillett (born 8 November 1958) is a British actor. He is best known for playing the role of Jack Maddox in the BBC series The House of Eliott.

== Biography and career ==
Gillett was born on 12 January 1958 in Aden, Yemen, from which he got his name. He attended Elizabeth College, Guernsey.

Gillett trained at the Royal Academy of Dramatic Art. He has received a number of awards and honours for his work, including the Tree Prize, the Sir Emile Littler Prize, the Vanbrugh Prize and the Radio Prize. He received the Theatre World Award for Best Newcomer on Broadway for his performance in "An Inspector Calls" at the Royale Theatre, Broadway.

Gillett played Mr Banks in a new production of Mary Poppins and Benedick in Much Ado About Nothing. In films, he appeared in The Winslow Boy and The Borrowers. He played Dr. Chiltern in Pollyanna 2003 film.

Gillett is active in the Theatre Royal at Bath with the Peter Hall Company in numerous productions of Shakespearean plays and other classics, including Antony and Cleopatra, As You Like It, and at The Old Vic in The Tempest. He also appeared in Noël Coward's Blithe Spirit, and Private Lives, and in George Bernard Shaw's Man and Superman and The Doctor's Dilemma.

On television, he appeared as Robin Hood in Ivanhoe and as Peter Townsend, Princess Margaret's forbidden love, in The Queen's Sister. He also appeared in Harry Enfield's Television Programme and as Charles Garner in episode 8 series 2 of Lovejoy first broadcast on 24 February 1991.

Gillett narrated the 2004 Discovery Channel documentary Who Betrayed Anne Frank. The documentary discusses the suspect who exposed the location of the Frank Family to the gestapo's in accordance from evidence found by author Carol Ann Lee.

From December 2018 to January 2019 he played the role of Scrooge in the RSC's production of A Christmas Carol at Stratford-upon-Avon.

Gillett was married to actress Sara Stewart. They have two children.

== Filmography ==
Actor
Title	Year	Role	Notes
Mister Clay, Mister Clay	1985	Mathew Clay	
Hot Metal	1986	Reporter	Episode The Tell-Tale Heart (16 February 1986)
A Hazard of Hearts	1987	Groom (uncredited)	TV movie (CBS)
Ending Up	1989	Trevor	
Screen Two	1990	Ulinov	Episode Kremlin Farewell (1 April 1990)
Under the Lighthouse Dancing	1996	David	
The Borrowers	1997	Joe Lender	
Innocents	2000	Steve Bolsin	
Shadow of the Vampire	2000	Henrik Galeen	
The Queen's Sister	2005	Peter Townsend	TV movie
Midsomer Murders	2010	Ian Kent	“The Silent Land” S13 (22 September 2010)
Tula: The Revolt	2013	Father Schinck	
Lewis	2013	Tom Marston	Season 8 "Entry Wounds", 2 episodes
Father Brown	2015	Bentley Duke	Episode 3.14 "The Deadly Seal"
Midsomer Murders	2016	Christopher Corby	S18E5: “Saints and Sinners”
Vera	2016	Harry Benton	Episode: “The Moth Catcher”
The Foreigner	2017	Ross	
Brexit: The Uncivil War	2019	Robert Mercer	TV movie
The Crown	2019	Richard Crossman	Season 3, "Olding", “Aberfan”, “Bubbikins”
