= The Clerk's Twa Sons o Owsenford =

Traditional song

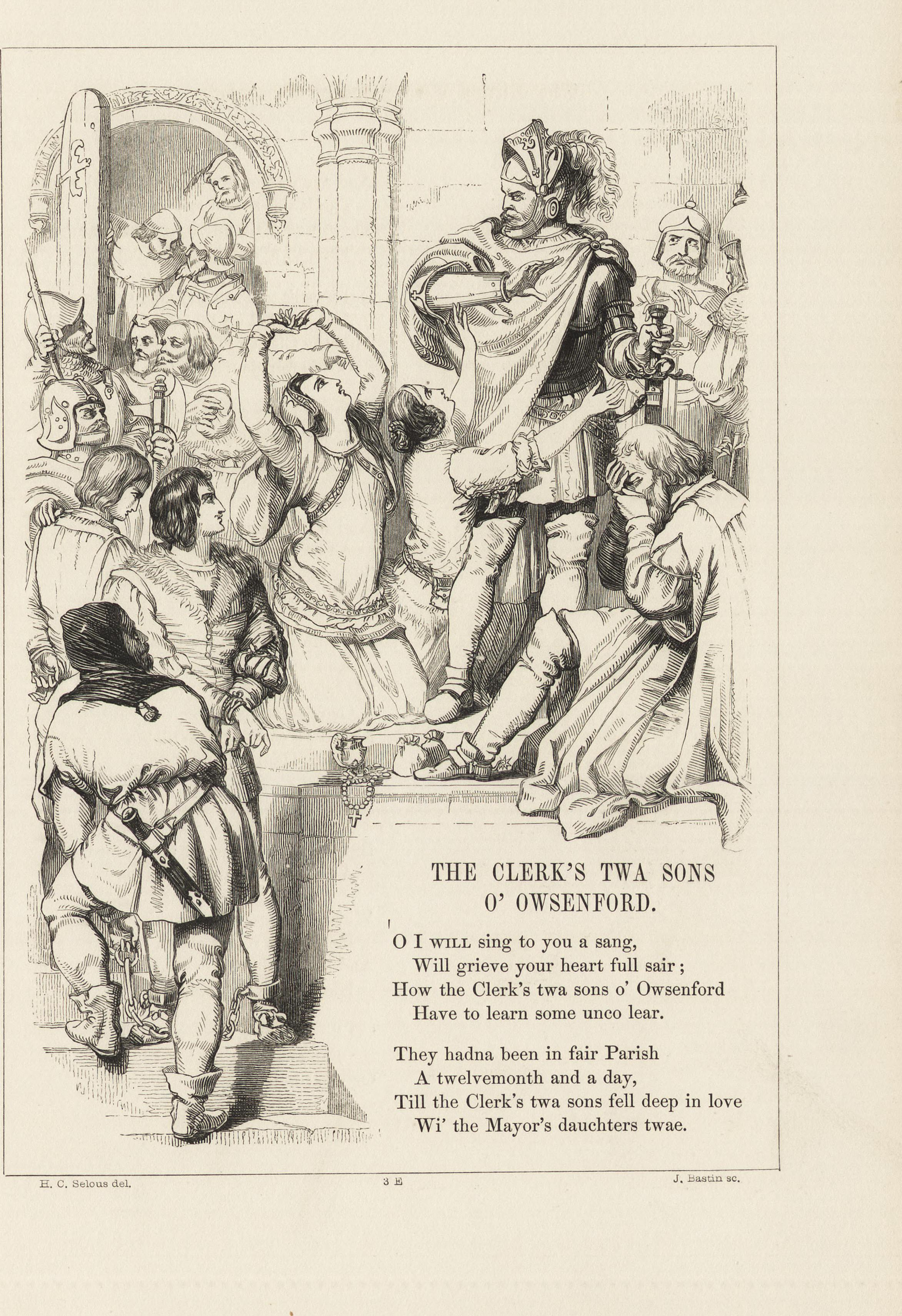
The Clerk’s Twa Sons o' Owsenfordfrom The Book of British Ballads (1842)

The Clerk’s Twa Sons o Owsenford is Child ballad 72.

== Synopsis ==
The clerk's two sons seduce the two daughters of a mayor. The mayor sentences them to hang. Their father comes to plead for them, but is unsuccessful. The daughters, if they appear, also plead without success.

On his return, the father may tell the mother that their sons will return at Christmas.

In some variants, the daughters and the parents die as well, of grief.

== Commentary ==
This ballad appears closely related to The Wife of Usher's Well. In some variants of that ballad, the wife's dead sons return to her as ghosts at Christmas; this sort of appearance may be what the father means in the variants when he speaks of their coming at Christmas.
