= Alison Peebles =

British actor, dancer and director

Alison Peebles (born 1953) is a Scottish actress, director, and writer in theatre, film, and television. She is a co-founder of Communicado, a Scottish theatre company.

== Early life ==
Peebles trained as a painter at Edinburgh College of Art.

== Career ==
In 1983, she co-founded Communicado, a Scottish theatre company, with Gerry Mulgrew and Rob Pickavance.

Peebles portrayed Lady Macbeth in Michael Boyd's celebrated 1993 production of Macbeth at the Tron Theatre in Glasgow, Scotland.

She directed the film AfterLife, which won the Standard Life Audience Award at the Edinburgh International Film Festival in 2003.

== Personal life ==
Peebles appeared in the documentary Multiple, shown on BBC Scotland in February 2006, in which she revealed that she has multiple sclerosis. Her Molly and Mack character, Mrs. Juniper, has been shown to use a crutch to get around.

== Awards and honours ==
In 2016, Peebles was nominated for Best Supporting Actress at the 2016 BAFTA Scotland Film Awards.

== Theatre ==
Year	Title	Role	Company	Director	Notes
1987	The Hypochondriak	Beline	Royal Lyceum Theatre Company, Edinburgh	John Matthews and Gerry Mulgrew	Hector MacMillan's Scots translation of Molière's Le Malade imaginaire
1987	Mary Queen of Scots Got Her Head Chopped Off	Elizabeth	Communicado	Gerry Mulgrew	play by Liz Lochhead
1993	Macbeth	Lady Macbeth	Tron Theatre, Glasgow	Michael Boyd	play by William Shakespeare

== Filmography ==
=== Actress ===
- 1990 Casualty (TV series)
- 1991–1992 The Advocates (TV series)
- 1992 Bunch of Five (TV series)
- 1992–1993 Strathblair (TV series)
- 1995 The Final Cut (TV mini-series)
- 1996 Rab C. Nesbitt (TV series)
- 1997 Bumping the Odds (TV movie)
- 1998 The Acid House (film)
- 1999 Psychos (TV mini-series)
- 2003 Skagerrak (film)
- 2003 AfterLife (film)
- 2004 Sex Traffic (TV movie)
- 1988–2005 Taggart (TV series)
- 2007 Silver Tongues (short)
- 2008 Trouble Sleeping
- 2004–2008 High Times (TV series)
- 2009 Eadar-Chluich (TV series)
- 2009 Wasted (film)
- 2009 Floating Is Easy (short)
- 2010 Labour (film short)
- 2010 Lip Service (TV series)
- 2011 Fast Romance (film)
- 2015 Where Do We Go From Here?
- 2018–2019 River City as Isobel MacKenzie
- 2018–2019 Molly and Mack (children's TV series)
- 2022 The Road Dance (film) Old Peggy
- 2023 Doctors as Barbara Gray
- 2025 Dept. Q (TV series)

=== Director ===
- 2001 Nan (film short)
- 2001 Tangerine (film short)
- 2002-2003 Stacey Stone (TV series)
- 2003 AfterLife (film)

== Radio ==
Date	Title	Role	Director	Station
19 February 2002	A Hundred Miles		Bruce Young	BBC Radio 4 Afternoon Play
7 January 2008	The Stanley Baxter Playhouse: The King's Kilt	Miss/Mistress MacEvoy	Marilyn Imrie	BBC Radio 4
16 January 2015	Take Me to the Necropolis	Gypsy Queen	Kirsty Williams	BBC Radio 4 Afternoon Play

== Awards ==
Year	Nominated Work	Awards	Category	Result
2016	Where Do We Go From Here?	British Academy Scotland Awards	Best Supporting Actress	Nominated
