= Hugh Ross (actor) =

Scottish actor (born 1945)

- Born: 28 April 1945 (age 81); Glasgow, Scotland
- Occupation: Actor
- Partner: David Harkins
- Website: hugh-ross.com

Hugh Ross in 2013

Hugh Ross (born 28 April 1945) is a Scottish actor, and theatre director. His credits include Trainspotting (1995), Hannibal Rising (2007), Bronson (2009), Dorian Gray (2009), The Iron Lady (2011), Nightbreed, and the TV adaptation of Sharpe.

== Early life ==
Ross was born in Glasgow, where his parents were both doctors. He was educated at The Glasgow Academy, an independent school, followed by the University of St Andrews. He then attended the Royal Academy of Dramatic Art in London, graduating in 1968 with an Acting (RADA Diploma).

== Career ==
=== Theatre ===
Ross began his career in repertory all over England. Starting with The Twin Rivals (1968), at the Vanbrugh Theatre. He played Romeo (1971) at the Open-air Theatre in Regent’s Park; Jaques in As You Like It (1990), for the Royal Shakespeare Company; and Dr Brooks in Lady in the Dark (1997) at the National Theatre. In 1997, he was nominated for an Laurence Olivier Award for Best Performance in a Supporting Role in a Musical for his performance in Stephen Sondheim’s Passion at the Queen’s Theatre in London’s West End. His performance as Malvolio in Cheek by Jowl’s Twelfth Night (1987), won the Time Out Performer Award. In 2010, he played Polonius in Hamlet at the Crucible Theatre, Sheffield, with John Simm; and in 2013, Duncan in Macbeth with Claire Foy and James McAvoy at the Trafalgar Studios in London.

In September 2016, his production company, The Other Cheek, in association with Cahoots Theatre Company, presented a revival of J. B. Priestley's The Roundabout at the Park Theatre, London, to great acclaim.

In 2018, He directed the West End production of The Mousetrap at the St Martin's Theatrein the West End of London.

=== Film & television ===
Ross has a wide variety of British film and television credits, albeit, mainly supporting and guest roles in films such as Trainspotting (1995), Hannibal Rising (2007), and Bronson (2009), Dorian Gray (2009), and The Iron Lady (2011).

Hugh is a member of the Associate committee of RADA.

== Credits ==
| Year | Title | Role | Notes |
|---|---|---|---|
| 1969 | Dr. Finlay's Casebook | Youth | Episode: "The Call" |
| 1972 | Doomwatch | Ian | Episode: "Say Knife, Fat Man" |
| 1972 | Kate | Mike Stewart | 4 episodes: "A Very Long Spoon", "A Step in the Right Direction", "The Woman Behind the Man", "Back to Square One" |
| 1973 | Crown Court | P.C. Walker | 3 episodes: "The Age of Leo Trotsky: Part 1", "The Age of Leo Trotsky: Part 2", "The Age of Leo Trotsky: Part 3" |
| 1973 | Six Days of Justice | Mr. Simmonds | Episode: "The Complaint" |
| 1975 | General Hospital | Jonathan Armstrong | 4 episodes |
| 1975 | Play of the Month:Love's Labours Lost | A Forester | "Love's Labour's Lost" |
| 1976 | Warship | Sg. Lt. Gladman | Episode: "The Buccaneer" |
| 1977 | Anna Karenina | Sludin | 4 episodes |
| 1978 | Killer's Moon | Government Minister | |
| 1978 | Tycoon | Tommy Meadowes | 9 episodes |
| 1980 | Screenplay – Lives of Our Own | Dr. Porteous | |
| 1982 | The Stanley Baxter Hour | | |
| 1983 | Jury | Defence Counsel | 13 episodes in total |
| 1985 | The Pickwick Papers | Jackson | 3 episodes |
| 1985 | Dempsey and Makepeace | Van Gelder | Episode: "Set a Thief" |
| 1986 | Dramarama | Trimmer | 1 episode |
| 1988 | Codename: Kyril | Detective Fitzgerald | |
| 1988 | God’s Frontiersmen | King James I | |
| 1988 | Playing for Real | Minister | |
| 1989 | Screen Two | Duffy | 1 episode: "Leaving" |
| 1989 | Screen One | Doctor | 1 episode: "She’s Been Away" |
| 1989 | Boon | Patterson | |
| 1989 | 4Play- Family | McWhirter | |
| 1990 | Taggart | Richard Smiley | Episode: "Love Knot" |
| 1990 | Nightbreed | Narcisse | |
| 1990 | This Is David Harper – Born Again Yesterday | Apostle Crompton | |
| 1991 | Kinsey | Potter | |
| 1991 | Misterioso | | |
| 1991 | Advocates I | Archie Hoseason | |
| 1992 | Patriot Games | Barrister Atkinson | |
| 1992 | An Ungentlemanly Act | Maj. Garry Noott | |
| 1992 | Warburg: A Man of Influence | Lord Halifax | |
| 1993 | Agatha Christie's Poirot | Stephen Carter | Episode: "The Yellow Iris" |
| 1993 | Lovejoy | Adrian Stoneleigh-Stibbs | Episode: "Poetic Licence" |
| 1993 | Between the Lines | Cmdr. Graham Sullivan | 11 episodes |
| 1994 | Absolutely Fabulous | Judge | 2 episodes |
| 1995 | Doctor Finlay | George Renfrew | 1 episode: A Natural Mistake |
| 1995 | Sharpe’s Gold | Major Mungo Munro | |
| 1995 | Sharpe’s Battle | Major Mungo Munro | |
| 1995 | Sharpe’s Sword | Major Mungo Munro | |
| 1996 | Trainspotting | Interviewer | |
| 1998 | Invasion: Earth | Dr. Vickers | |
| 2001 | The Mists of Avalon | Bishop Patricius | |
| 2001 | The Cazalets | Dr. Bailey | |
| 2001 | Rebus | Dr. Joseph Margolies | Episode: "Dead Souls" |
| 2001 | Murder Rooms | Doyle Senior | |
| 2001 | Charlotte Gray | Psychiatrist | |
| 2002 | Snoddy | Chief Inspector Chalmers | |
| 2002 | Shackleton | Marsh | |
| 2002 | Monarch of the Glen | Greg MacDonald | |
| 2002 | The Four Feathers | Regimental Priest | |
| 2002 | Before You Go | Mr Berry | |
| 2002 | Post | Boss | |
| 2003 | Taggart | William Moyles | Episode: "New Life" |
| 2004 | Sea of Souls | Dean Claremont | 6 episodes |
| 2004 | Mine All Mine | Mr. Coltrane | 3 episodes |
| 2005 | Egypt | Sylvestre de Sacy | 1 episode: The Mystery of the Rosetta Stone |
| 2006 | Pinochet in Suburbia | Magistrate | |
| 2006 | Dalziel and Pascoe | Andrew Caulfield | Episode: "Guardian Angel" |
| 2006 | Ancient Rome: The Rise and Fall of an Empire | Senator Piso | Episode: "Nero" |
| 2007 | Legit | Locatelli | |
| 2007 | Rendition | Solicitor | |
| 2007 | Hannibal Rising | Professor Dumas | |
| 2008 | The Palace | Jeremy Robinson | 8 episodes |
| 2009 | Midsomer Murders | Ed Monkberry | Episode: "The Dogleg Murders" |
| 2009 | Dorian Gray | Confessor | |
| 2009 | Bronson | Uncle Jack | |
| 2010 | Foyle’s War | Richard Carstairs KC | Episode: "The Hide" |
| 2010 | First Night | Bunny | |
| 2010 | Agatha Christie's Marple | Lord Justice Carmichael | Episode: "The Blue Geranium" |
| 2010 | Silk | Victor Cornish | |
| 2011 | Psychoville | Vicar | |
| 2011 | Rab C. Nesbitt | Ramsey | |
| 2011 | Jabberwock | Reginald | |
| 2011 | Midsomer Murders | Bishop Graves | Episode: "A Sacred Trust" |
| 2011 | The Iron Lady | Christopher Soames | |
| 2012 | Dark Matters: Twisted But True | Sir Arthur Woodward / Benjamin Franklin | |
| 2014 | Waterloo Road | Mr. Carmichael | Episode: "One Good Turn" |
| 2015 | Sunset Song | Inspector | |
| 2015 | The Team | William MacLean | |
| 2018 | Married to a Paedophile | Robert | |
| 2020 | Outlander (TV series) | Arch Bug | |
