= Finlay Christie (comedian) =

British stand-up comedian (born 1999)

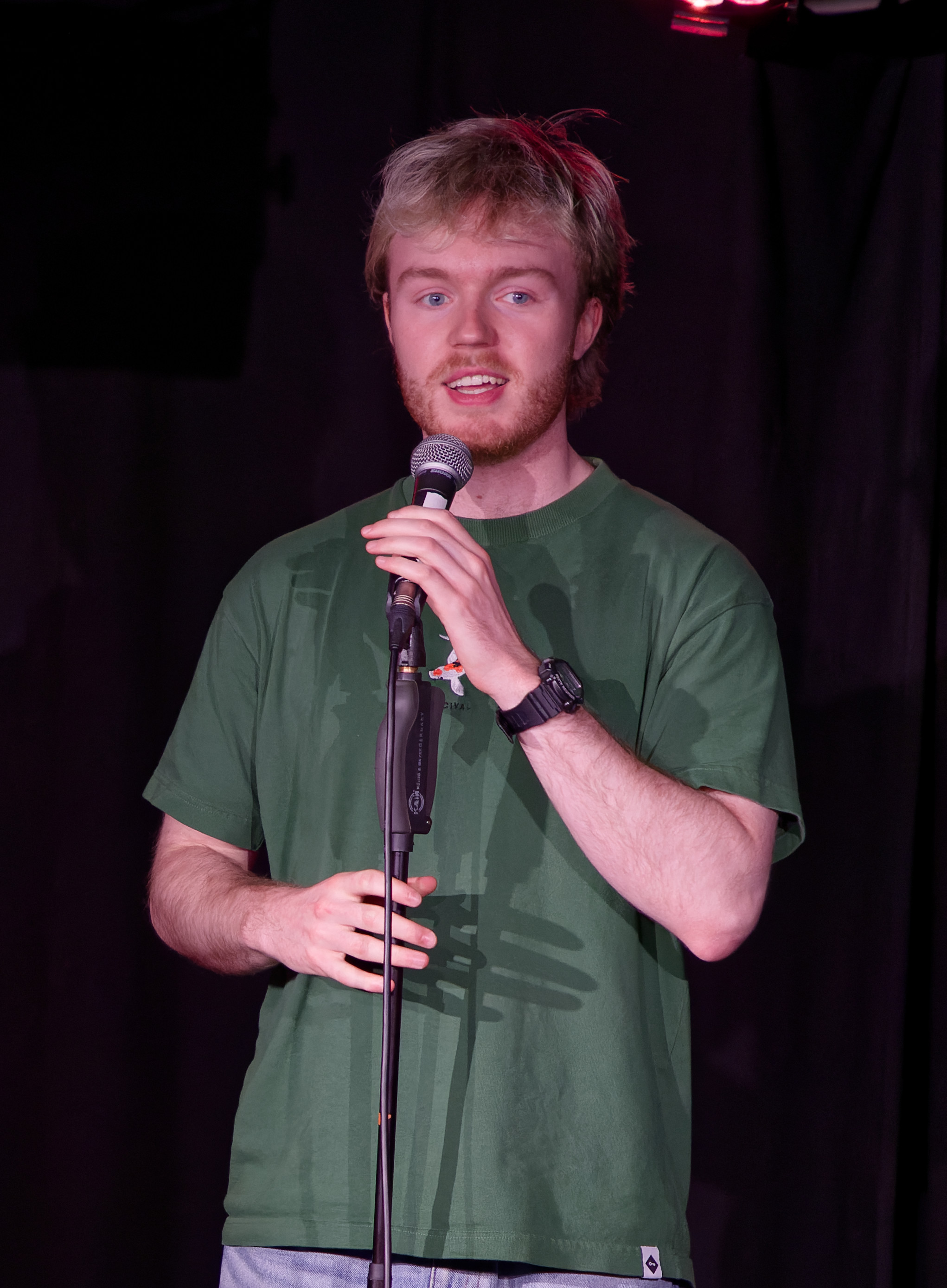
- Christie at the 2024 Edinburgh Festival Fringe
- Born: 7 June 1999 (age 27)
- Occupation: Comedian
- Years active: 2010s–present

Finlay Christie (born 7 June 1999) is a British comedian. Christie came to prominence posting comedy skits on YouTube and TikTok. He has appeared on 8 Out of 10 Cats Does Countdown, Have I Got News For You and Live at the Apollo, and in 2024 hosted his first show at the Edinburgh Festival Fringe.

== Early life ==
Christie attended Forest School, Walthamstow, a private school in Greater London. He received a first class degree in BA Language and Culture from University College London.

Christie's love for comedy started as a child, and he has noted Phil Kay and John Hegley as influences. Christie started performing comedy at age six. In 2011, aged twelve, he played Victor Secret-Past on the BBC2 show, The Bleak Old Shop of Stuff. From 2011 to 2013 he appeared in the BBC Radio 4 series "The Gobetweenies". When he was fourteen he appeared on Blue Peter.

== Career ==
In 2019, Christie won the So You Think You're Funny competition, one of the youngest ever winners. He started uploading comedy skits to YouTube and TikTok during lockdown in 2020.

His first comedy special, "OK Zoomer", was released on YouTube in 2023.

His second, "Aura Farmer" was also released on YouTube 2 years later in 2025.

He was among the first wave of comedians at the Edinburgh Festival Fringe who gained fame on TikTok. His 2024 Fringe show, I Deserve This, received four out of five stars from The Guardian. Christie described his Fringe show as: "about being a young person, privilege, drugs, religiously forbidden relationships and an emotional encounter with a tiger. There are one-liners, stories, routines, impressions. It’s very honest and personal but the gag rate is high."

As a member of Generation Z, his humour often plays on generational resentment, and his self-described privileged background.

Christie also works in marketing, writing scripts for companies to use in TikTok videos.

== Personal life ==
Christie is fluent in French and spent six months performing stand up comedy in French in Lyon.
