= Gregory Norminton =

English novelist

Gregory Norminton (born 1976) is an English novelist. Born in Berkshire and educated at Wellington College, he read English at Regent's Park College, Oxford and studied acting at the London Academy of Music and Dramatic Art. He is a Senior Lecturer in creative writing at Manchester Metropolitan University. He lives in Sheffield with his wife, Emma, and their daughter. They are Quakers.

His novels include The Ship of Fools (2002), Arts and Wonders (2004), Ghost Portrait (2005) and Serious Things (2008), all published by Sceptre. The Lost Art of Losing, a collection of aphorisms, and Thumbnails, a collection of stories, have been published by Vagabond Voices. In April 2017, Comma Press brought out his second collection of short stories, The Ghost Who Bled. The Devil's Highway, Norminton's fifth novel - and his first in nearly ten years - was published by Fourth Estate in January 2018.

Gregory Norminton wrote the stories 'Fall Caesar', 'The Poison Tree' and 'The Fortress at Bruges' for BBC Radio 4, and his short stories have appeared in editions of Prospect, Resurgence and London Magazine.

Norminton's work for radio includes dramatisations of The Machine Stops by E.M. Forster and Utz by Bruce Chatwin. His translations include The Dictionary of Received Ideas by Gustave Flaubert, The Little Prince] by Antoine de Saint-Exupéry and Belle and Sébastien: The Child of the Mountains by Cécile Aubry.

In 2005 he took part in Planet Action, an eco-reality series made by the global television network Animal Planet in conjunction with the WWF. Following his return, Norminton worked for years to create a collection of short stories by major British writers responding to the ecological crisis. In 2013, Oneworld Publications published Beacons - stories for our not so distant future, edited by Gregory Norminton, with original fiction from writers including Joanne Harris, Lawrence Norfolk, Alasdair Gray, A. L. Kennedy, Janice Galloway and Liz Jensen. Author royalties from the sale of the paperback and e-book go to Stop Climate Chaos.

Norminton has been writer in residence at Magdalene College, Cambridge and he was a featured artist at the 2003 International Writing Program at the University of Iowa. He received a Writer's Award from the Arts Council of England in 2003, and another from the Scottish Arts Council in 2010.
