= Phyllis Logan =

Scottish actress (born 1956)

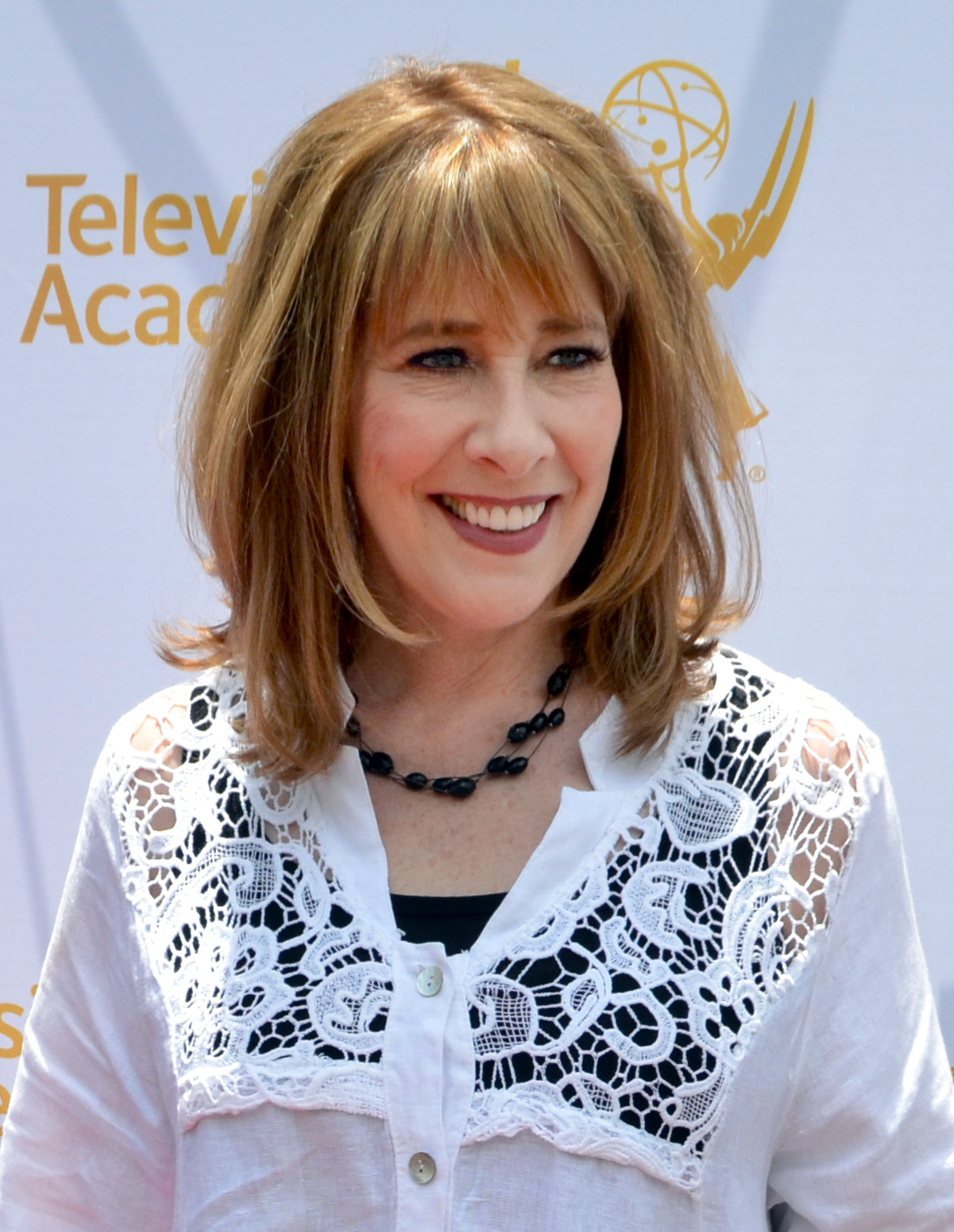
- Logan at an event for Downton Abbey Cast and Creators, May 2014
- Born: 11 January 1956 (age 70); Paisley, Renfrewshire, Scotland
- Education: Royal Scottish Academy of Music and Drama (1977)
- Occupation: Actress
- Years active: 1977–present
- Spouse: Kevin McNally (m. 2011)
- Children: 1

Phyllis Logan (born 11 January 1956) is a Scottish actress, widely known for her roles as Lady Jane Felsham in Lovejoy (1986–1993) and Mrs Hughes in Downton Abbey (2010–2015). She won the BAFTA Award for Most Promising Newcomer for the 1983 film Another Time, Another Place and was nominated for BAFTA Award for Best Actress in a Leading Role for the same film. Her other film appearances include Secrets & Lies (1996), Shooting Fish (1997), Downton Abbey (2019) and Misbehaviour (2020).

== Early life and education ==
Logan was born in Paisley, Renfrewshire, and grew up nearby Johnstone. Her father, David, was a Rolls-Royce engineer and a trade-union leader and became the secretary of his local branch of the AUEW (Amalgamated Union of Engineering Workers). Logan is the youngest in her family and has a brother and a sister. Her father died at the age of 59 while she was at drama school.

Logan was educated at Johnstone High School. She studied at the Royal Scottish Academy of Music and Drama in Glasgow and graduated with the James Bridie gold medal in 1977.

== Career ==
After graduation Logan joined the Dundee Repertory Theatre. She left in 1979 to work on stage in Edinburgh. She also worked regularly on Scottish television. On the BBC Scotland production The White Bird Passes, she first met writer-director Michael Radford. For his first feature film, Another Time, Another Place (1983), he cast Logan in the leading role of Janie, for which she won a Gold Award for Best Actress at the Taormina Film Festival and the Evening Standard Award for Best Actress in 1983 and the BAFTA Award for Most Promising Newcomer to Leading Film Roles in 1984. She was also nominated for the BAFTA Award for Best Actress in a Leading Role.

Before her success in Downton Abbey, in which she played the housekeeper Mrs Hughes, Logan was widely known for the role of Lady Jane Felsham, co-starring with Ian McShane, for eight years in nearly fifty episodes of Lovejoy, a comedy-drama for television.

Her character in Downton Abbey, Mrs Hughes, was voted the best Downton Abbey character of all time in a poll conducted by RadioTimes.com (the official website of Radio Times).

She also starred in the 1996 Mike Leigh film Secrets & Lies alongside Timothy Spall and Brenda Blethyn. Logan provided the broadcast voice of Ingsoc in a film version of Nineteen Eighty-Four (1984) and the Loch Ness Monster (Nessie) in the animated film Freddie as F.R.O.7 (1992). She was in the radio series Coming Alive and Baggage. She played Inspector Frost's love interest and eventual wife in If Dogs Run Free, the last story in the A Touch of Frost series.

Logan played Maggie Smart in The Good Karma Hospital (7 episodes, 2017–2018) on the ITV drama series which was later made available on Acorn TV. She also starred in a main role as Linda Hutchinson in the ITV drama series Girlfriends which was created and directed by Kay Mellor, alongside Miranda Richardson and Zoë Wanamaker.

She played Andinio in "The Battle of Ranskoor Av Kolos", the tenth episode in the eleventh series of Doctor Who.

She starred as Maggie Lynch in the second series of the television series Guilt, which was shown on both BBC Two and BBC Scotland in 2021. At the British Academy Scotland Awards 2022, Logan won the award for Best Actress – Television for the role. She also starred in the third and final series which was released in April 2023, premiering on BBC Scotland on 25 April 2023.

In 2024, she played Grace Bain in series 8 of Shetland.

In 2025, she played the leading role Cora Felton aka The Puzzle Lady in the first season of Murder Most Puzzling, a television mini-series adaptation of the best-selling murder mystery books by American author Parnell Hall. Logan described the series, written by Dominique Moloney, as "a bit like Murder She Wrote meets Miss Marple on steroids". Logan’s real-life husband, Kevin McNally, plays her character’s love-interest.

== Personal life ==
Logan met her now-husband, actor Kevin McNally, in the 1994 mini-series Love and Reason. They married in 2011 and have one son. They live in Chiswick.

She supports several charities that promote the welfare of dementia patients, and she is also a supporter of SSPCA.

== Filmography ==
=== Film ===
Year	Title	Role	Notes
1983	Another Time, Another Place	Janie	BAFTA Award for Most Promising Newcomer to Leading Film Roles; Evening Standard British Film Award for Best Actress; Rimini Film Festival Award for Best Actress; Taormina Film Fest Golden Mask Award; Nominated – BAFTA Award for Best Actress in a Leading Role; Nominated – David di Donatello for Best Foreign Actress
1983	Every Picture Tells a Story	Agnes Scott	
1984	The Chain	Alison	
1984	Nineteen Eighty-Four	Telescreen Announcer	Voice
1985	The Doctor and the Devils	Elizabeth Rock	
1987	The Inquiry	Claudia Procula	
1987	The Kitchen Toto	Janet Graham	
1989	The Legendary Life of Ernest Hemingway	Mary Welsh	
1989	The Angry Earth	Mary Penrys Jones	
1990	The Dark Sun	Camilla Staffa	
1992	Freddie as F.R.O.7.	Nessie (voice)	
1992	Soft Top Hard Shoulder	Karla	
1993	Franz Kafka's It's a Wonderful Life	Frau Brunofsky	Short film
1996	Secrets & Lies	Monica Purley	
1997	Shooting Fish	Mrs. Ross	
2003	Crust	Bill's Girlfriend	
2009	Nativity!	Mrs. Lore	
2012	Day of the Flowers	Brenda	
2019	Downton Abbey	Elsie Hughes-Carson	
2020	Misbehaviour	Evelyn Alexander	
2021	The Last Bus	Mary	
2021	Last Train to Christmas	Auntie Vi	
2022	Downton Abbey: A New Era	Elsie Hughes-Carson	
2022	Rocketry: The Nambi Effect	Mrs. Cleaver	
2023	Surprised by Oxford	Provost Regina Knight	
2024	No Way Up	Mardy 'Nana'	
2025	Downton Abbey: The Grand Finale	Elsie Hughes-Carson	

=== Television ===
Year	Title	Role	Notes
1980	Shoestring	Linda	Episode: "Mocking Bird"
1980	The White Bird Passes	Janie (age 16)	TV film
1981	Beginnings	Nell	TV film
1981	Play for Today	Nancy Park	Episode: "The Good Time Girls"
1982	Scotch and Wry	Various	Episode: "Hogmanay 1982"
1985	Time and the Conways	Kay Conway	TV film
1985	Off Peak	Janet	TV film
1986	Screen Two	Anne	Episode: "The McGuffin"
1986–1994	Lovejoy	Lady Jane Felsham	Main role (series 1–5), guest (season 6)
1987	First Sight	Kathy	Episode: "Extras"
1987	Bust	Sheila Walsh	TV series
1987	When Reason Sleeps: Out of Time	Helen Wilmot	TV film
1988	Hannay	Alison Ross	Episode: "Act of Riot"
1989	Screen Two	Alison	Episode: "Sitting Targets"
1989	Screen Two	Lee	Episode: "Defrosting the Fridge"
1989	And a Nightingale Sang	Helen Stott	TV film
1989	Goldeneye	Ann Fleming	TV film
1991	Screen One	Dora	Episode: "Happy Feet"
1991	Play on One	Andrea	Episode: "And the Cow Jumped Over the Moon"
1991	Play on One	Dr Ruth Kovacs	Episode: "Effie's Burning"
1993	Love and Reason	Lou Larson	TV miniseries
1993	Silent Cries	Nancy Muir	TV film
1995	Kavanagh QC	Samantha Fisher	Episode: "A Family Affair"
1995	The Big One	Mrs. Wilde	TV film
1995	Chiller	Anna Spalinsky	Episode: "Here Comes the Mirror Man"
1996	Pie in the Sky	Det. Supt. Chalmers	Episode: "Coddled Eggs"
1996	Inspector Morse	Julia Stevens	Episode: "The Daughters of Cain"
1997	Scene	Anna	Episode: "Skinny Marink"
1997	An Unsuitable Job for a Woman	Elizabeth Leaming	Episode: "Sacrifice"
1998	The Game	Betty McCallum	TV film
1998	Invasion: Earth	Helen Knox	TV miniseries
1999	Holby City	Muriel McKendrick	Main role (series 1)
1999	Midsomer Murders	Kate Merrill	Episode: "Strangler's Wood"
1999	Rab C Nesbitt	Jenny Welthorpe	Episode: "Commons"
1999	All the King's Men	Mary Beck	TV film
1999	Heartbeat	Julia Kendall	Episode: "Stag at Bay"
2000	Randall and Hopkirk (Deceased)	Harriet Banks-Smith	Episode: "The Best Years of Your Death"
2000	Hope and Glory	Annie Gilbert	Main role (series 3)
2001	NCS: Manhunt	Anne Warwick	TV film
2002	Dickens	Georgina Hogarth	Episode: "Terror to the End"
2002	Fields of Gold	Rachel Greenlaw	TV film
2002	The Real Jane Austen	Mrs. Austen	TV film
2003	The Inspector Lynley Mysteries	Miriam Whitelaw	Episode: "Playing for the Ashes"
2003	Alibi	Linda Brentwood	TV film
2003	Agatha Christie's Poirot	Nurse Hopkins	Episode: "Sad Cypress"
2004	Dalziel and Pascoe	Jenny Ettrick	Episode: "A Game of Soldiers"
2004	Murder in Suburbia	Wendy	Episode: "Noisy Neighbours"
2004	Silent Witness	Helen Wharton	Episodes: "Death by Water: Parts 1 & 2"
2005	Beneath the Skin	DCI Grace Shilling	TV film
2005, 2006	Spooks	Diana Jewell	Episodes: "4.8", "5.10"
2006	Missing	Karen Foster	TV film
2006	Sea of Souls	Elaine	Episode: "Sleeper"
2006	Heartbeat	Diane Bell	Episode: "Get Back"
2007	Richard is My Boyfriend	Laura	TV film
2007	Trial & Retribution	Anna Wildsmith	Episodes: "Curriculum Vitae: Parts 1 & 2"
2008	Honest	Jenny	Episode: "1.4"
2008	Taggart	Kathy Moffat	Episode: "Trust"
2008	New Tricks	Dr. Mathieson	Episode: "Mad Dogs"
2008	The Royal	George Fawcett	Episode: "Pastures New"
2010	Maid in Britain		TV movie documentary
2010	Silent Witness	Jennifer Mears	Episodes: "Shadows: Parts 1 & 2"
2010	Heartbeat	Rose Brown	Episode: "The War of the Roses"
2010	Wallander	Inga Wallander	Episode: "The Fifth Woman"
2010	A Touch of Frost	Christine Moorhead	Episodes: "If Dogs Run Free: Parts 1 & 2"
2010, 2012	Lip Service	Judy	Episodes: "1.4", "2.2"
2010–2015	Downton Abbey	Elsie May Carson (Mrs. Hughes)	Regular role
2012	Vera	Shirley	Episode: "A Certain Samaritan"
2014	Bones	Sandra Zins	Episode: "The Lost Love in the Foreign Land"
2017–2018	The Good Karma Hospital	Maggie Smart	Main role (series 1), guest (series 2)
2018	Girlfriends	Linda Hutchinson	Main role
2018	Doctor Who	Andinio	Episode: "The Battle of Ranskoor Av Kolos"
2019–2025	The Adventures of Paddington	Mrs. Bird	Voice
2020	Our Queen at War	Narrator	TV movie documentary
2020	The Highland Vet	Narrator	TV documentary series
2021	Intergalactic	Phoebe Skov-King	Episode: 1.5
2021	Ladybaby	Sheena Dunbar	
2021	Guilt	Maggie Lynch	Series 2 and 3
2024	Shetland	Grace Bain	Series 8
2025	Miss Austen	Mrs. Cassandra Austen	Series 1
2025	The Bombing of Pan Am 103	Moira Shearer	TV miniseries, 6 episodes
2025	Murder Most Puzzling	Cora Felton	Crime drama, 6 episodes
2026	A Taste For Murder	Elena Da Vinale	6 episodes
2026	Play for Today	Barbara	Episode: Village Idiot

=== Radio appearances ===
- Baggage as Fiona
- Coming Alive on BBC Radio 4
- BBC Radio Shakespeare: Macbeth (Dramatised) on BBC Radio 3 as Lady Macbeth
- R.L. Stevenson's Weir Of Hermiston on BBC Radio 4 as Kirstie
- Classic BBC Radio Horror: Dracula on BBC Radio 4
- Dr Finlay: Adventures of a Black Bag on BBC Radio 4

== Selected stage roles ==
Year	Title	Role	Theatre
1980	The Case of David Anderson Q. C.		Traverse Theatre, Edinburgh
1980	Threads	Bernadette	Hampstead Theatre
1983	The Communication Cord	Susan	Hampstead Theatre
1993	Marvin's Room	Lee Wakefield Lacker	Hampstead Theatre and Comedy Theatre, London
1994	Gaucho	Steph/Stephanie	Hampstead Theatre
2002	Richard III	Queen Elizabeth	Crucible Theatre, Sheffield
2008	2000 Feet Away	Nan	Bush Theatre
2016	Present Laughter	Monica Reed	Richmond Theatre
2018	Switzerland	Patricia Highsmith	Ambassadors Theatre, London and Theatre Royal, Bath

== Awards and nominations ==
In addition to the role-related awards listed below, Logan is 2023 winner of the St Andrew's Society of New York's Mark Twain Award in honour of her significant and positive impact on the Scots community around the world.

Year	Association	Category	Nominated work	Result
1983	Taormina Film Fest	Golden Mask	Another Time, Another Place	Won
1984	Rimini Film Festival	Best Actress	Another Time, Another Place	Won
1984	Evening Standard British Film Awards	Best Actress	Another Time, Another Place	Won
1984	British Academy Film Awards	Best Actress	Another Time, Another Place	Nominated
1984	British Academy Film Awards	Most Outstanding Newcomer to Film	Another Time, Another Place	Won
1986	David di Donatello Awards	Best Foreign Actress	Another Time, Another Place	Nominated
1991	British Academy Television Awards — Scotland	Scotland — Actress in 1991	The Play On One: And The Cow Jumped Over The Moon	Nominated
2012	Screen Actors Guild Award	Outstanding Performance by an Ensemble in a Drama Series	Downton Abbey	Won
2013	Screen Actors Guild Award	Outstanding Performance by an Ensemble in a Drama Series	Downton Abbey	Won
2014	Screen Actors Guild Award	Outstanding Performance by an Ensemble in a Drama Series	Downton Abbey	Nominated
2015	Screen Actors Guild Award	Outstanding Performance by an Ensemble in a Drama Series	Downton Abbey	Won
2016	Screen Actors Guild Award	Outstanding Performance by an Ensemble in a Drama Series	Downton Abbey	Won
2016	The National Trust for Scotland Foundation USA	Great Scot Award	Herself	Won
2017	Screen Actors Guild Award	Outstanding Performance by an Ensemble in a Drama Series	Downton Abbey	Nominated
2021	New York International Women's Festival	Best Ensemble Acting in a Film	You Really Got Me	Won
2022	British Academy Scotland Awards	Best Actress — Television	Guilt	Won
2022	Tweetfest Film Festival	Best Actress	Harold & Mary	Nominated
2024	Royal Television Society Scotland	Best Female Actor	Shetland	Won
