= Adie Allen =

British actress

Adie Allen (born 1966) is a British actress who graduated from the Royal Academy of Dramatic Art, RADA in 1987. She has appeared in new plays at the Royal Court, the Almeida, the Bush and the Tricycle Theatre(s). She frequently appears on British television. Notable television appearances include Casualty (she played student nurse Kelly Liddle in a number of episodes in 1991, the television series 99-1 playing Liz Hulley in 1994, Alan Ayckbourn's West End premiere of Communicating Doors at the Gielgud Theatre in 1996, playing the time-travelling prostitute Poopay, as well as the 1997 television drama The Woman in White playing Margaret Porcher, and the Peter Kosminsky film Innocents, playing Helen Rickard in 2000. She was brought up in Bristol and was educated at Monks Park Comprehensive School, leaving when she was sixteen.

She is married to the architect Duncan Dalgleish, and has three children.

== Filmography ==
=== Film ===
Year	Title	Role	Notes
1997	The Woman in White	Margaret Porcher	TV film
2000	Innocents	Helen Rickard	TV film
2002	Murder	Val	TV film
2003	Hear the Silence	Dr. Carmel Wakefield	TV film
2017	The Bookshop	Mrs. Traill	

=== Television ===
Year	Title	Role	Notes
1989	The Bill	W.P.C. Seymour	Episode: "Just a Little Run Around"
1990	Screen Two	WPC Lindsay	Episode: "Close Relations"
1990	Made in Heaven	Pet	Episode: "Falling for Love"
1990	EastEnders	W.P.C. Moran	1 episode
1991	Inspector Morse	Barbara Redpath	Episode: "Second Time Around"
1991	Casualty	Kelly Liddle	Recurring role
1992	Performance	Pearl Bryant	Episode: "Roots"
1992	The Mary Whitehouse Experience		1 episode
1992	Harry Enfield's Television Programme		1 episode
1992	Me, You and Him	Clare	Recurring role
1992	Business with Friends	Coral	TV short
1992	The Bill	Karen	Episode: "Principled Negotiation"
1993	Performance	Diaphanta	Episode: "The Changeling"
1993	Agatha Christie's Poirot	Lily	Episode: "The Underdog"
1993	Between the Lines	P.C. Linda Shore	Episode: "Big Boys' Rules"
1994	Calling the Shots	Angela	2 episodes
1994	The Bill	Nikki	Episode: "No Job for an Amateur"
1994-1995	99-1	DC Liz Hulley	Series regular
1995	The Vet	Debbie Fairbrother	Episode: "Home Truths"
1996	Sharman	Dawn	Recurring role
1998	The Bill	Claire Tyson	Episode: "Out on a Limb"
1998	Wycliffe	Janet Miller	Episode: "On Offer"
2000	Waking the Dead	Jenny Boyd	Episode: "Pilot: Part 1"
2001	Where the Heart Is	Sarah Morecroft	Episode: "Happiness"
2001	Midsomer Murders	Annie	Episode: "Destroying Angel"
2002	Holby City	Jill Jenner	Episode: "Perfect Day"
2003	40	Joanne	Miniseries
2003	William and Mary	Jan	1 episode
2003	Single	Mel	1 episode
2004	Rose and Maloney	Superintendent Carol James	Episode: "George Parris: Part 2"
2005	The Inspector Lynley Mysteries	Liz Hughes	Episode: "In Divine Proportion"
2006	Mayo	Mable Feathers	Episode: "A Species of Revenge"
2006	Holby City	Rainy Carter	Episode: "Snake in the Grass"
2007-2009	Mist: The Tale of a Sheepdog Puppy	Various roles	
2008-2009	EastEnders	DS Louise Hills	Recurring role
2009	Casualty	Ellie Barton	Episode: "Not Forgotten"
2010	Doctors	Gill Wren	Episode: "Finding the Words"
2012	Doctors	Jo Gilmour	Episode: "Singing in the Dark"
2013	Silent Witness	Stella Hancock	Episode: "The Legacy"
2014	Doctors	Sister Catherine	Episode: "Nun But the Brave"
2015	Doctors	Bev Wilde	Episode: "I Got Up"
2015	Casualty	DS Gill Mangrove	Recurring role
2015	New Tricks	Lizzie Bentham	Episode: "Lottery Curse"
2016	Father Brown	Iris Lightman	Episode: "The Hangman's Demise"
2016	Witless	Mrs. Forrest	Recurring role
2016	The Coroner	Karen Shaw	Episode: "Perfectly Formed"
2018	Doctors	Stella Barkis	Episode: "Fee-Fi-WiFi"
2019	A Confession	Anna Proctor	1 episode
