= Mother's Milk =

Mother's Milk may refer to:

- Mother's milk, milk produced by mammary glands located in the breast of a human female to feed a young child
- Mother's Milk (album), an album by Red Hot Chili Peppers
  - Mother's Milk Tour, 1989–1990 worldwide concert tour
- Mother's Milk (novel), by Edward St Aubyn
- Mother's Milk (film), a 2011 British drama film
- Mother's Milk, original planned title of the 2023 film The Good Mother
- "Mother's Milk" (Law & Order), an episode of the television series Law & Order
- Mother's Milk (character), a character in comic book and television series The Boys
- Mother's Milk, a predecessor of American rock band Boston
- "Mother's Milk", a song by Swans from The Great Annihilator
