= Richard Greatrex =

British cinematographer (b. 1947)

Richard Greatrex BSC
- Born: 1947 (age 78–79); Swansea, Wales
- Education: Coleg Harlech; University of Sussex; Balliol College, Oxford; National Film and Television School
- Occupations: Cinematographer, photographer
- Website: richardgreatrex.com

Richard Greatrex, BSC (born 1947) is a retired Welsh cinematographer. He was nominated for an Academy Award and a BAFTA Award for his work on Shakespeare in Love (1998). He previously won a BAFTA TV Award for the BBC television film The Woman in White (1997).

== Early life and education ==
Born and raised in Swansea in 1947, he was educated at Coleg Harlech, University of Sussex, and Balliol College, Oxford. For a time, he lived in the United States, producing material for the United Mine Workers of America in Tennessee. After returning to the UK, he enrolled in the National Film and Television School, graduating in 1980.

== Filmography ==
=== Film ===
Year	Title	Director	Role
1986	Knights & Emeralds	Ian Emes	
1988	For Queen and Country	Martin Stellman	
1989	War Requiem	Derek Jarman	
1989	The Bulldance	Zelda Barron	
1991	The Lunatic	Lol Creme	
1994	Deadly Advice	Mandie Fletcher	
1995	Blue Juice	Carl Prechezer	
1997	Mrs Brown	John Madden	
1998	Shakespeare in Love	John Madden	
1999	Janice Beard	Clare Kilner	
2000	Where the Heart Is	Matt Williams	
2001	Happy Now?	Philippa Cousins	
2001	A Knight's Tale	Brian Helgeland	
2003	I Capture the Castle	Tim Fywell	
2004	Connie and Carla	Michael Lembeck	
2004	The Rocket Post	Stephen Whittaker	
2005	The Upside of Anger	Mike Binder	
2005	The Detonator	Po-Chih Leong	
2005	Chaos	Tony Giglio	
2006	Big Nothing	Jean-Baptiste Andrea	
2007	Run Fatboy Run	David Schwimmer	
2007	Flawless	Michael Radford	
2008	Three and Out	Jonathan Gershfield	
—N/a	Gossip	Don Boyd	Unfinished

==== Short films ====
Year	Title	Director	Role
1981	Never Say Die!	Sandy Johnson	Short film
2015	The Dancing Floor	Lyn Webster Wilde	Short film

=== Television ===
Year	Title	Role
1982	The Magnificent One	Television film
1983-84	The Comic Strip Presents...	2 episodes
1984	Play At Home	Documentary; 1 episode
1984	Aderyn Papur... and Pigs Might Fly	Television film
1987	Brond	Miniseries
1989	Goldeneye	Television film
1991	Gone to the Dogs	Miniseries
1993	Screen One	Episode: "Truth or Dare"
1995	The Plant	Television film
1995	It Could Be You	Television film
1997	Stone Cold	Television film
1997	Dalziel and Pascoe	1 episode
1997	The Woman in White	Miniseries
1998	Tess of the D'Urbervilles	Miniseries
1998	Getting Hurt	Television film
1999	Warriors	Miniseries
2000	The Last of the Blonde Bombshells	Television film
2003	Sons & Lovers	Television film

== Awards and nominations ==
Award	Year	Category	Work	Result	Ref.
Academy Award	1999	Best Cinematography	Shakespeare in Love	Nominated	
American Society of Cinematographers Award	1999	Outstanding Achievement in Cinematography in Theatrical Releases	Shakespeare in Love	Nominated	
British Academy Film Award	1999	Best Cinematography	Shakespeare in Love	Nominated	
British Academy Television Award	1997	Best Photography & Lighting: Fiction	Screen One ("Truth or Dare")	Nominated	
British Academy Television Award	1998	Best Photography & Lighting: Fiction	The Woman in White	Won	
British Academy Television Award	2000	Best Photography & Lighting: Fiction	Warriors	Nominated	
British Society of Cinematographers Award	1999	Best Cinematography in a Theatrical Feature Film	Shakespeare in Love	Nominated	
Royal Television Society Craft & Design Award	1998	Best Photography, Camera and Lighting	The Woman in White	Won	
Satellite Award	1999	Best Cinematography	Shakespeare in Love	Nominated	
