= Johnny and the Dead (TV series) =

- Genre: Comedy; Family; Drama
- Written by: Lindsey Jenkins; Gerald Fox; Terry Pratchett
- Directed by: Gerald Fox
- Starring: Jotham Annan; George Baker; Brian Blessed; Mark Chapman; Paul Child; Andrew Falvey; David Gooderson; John Grillo; Harry Landis; Ray Lonnen; Tina Martin; Charlie Watts; Geoffrey Whitehead; Arthur Whybrow
- Music by: Stefan Girardet
- Country of origin: United Kingdom
- Original language: English
- No. of series: 1
- No. of episodes: 4

Production
- Producers: Gerald Fox; Peter Pearson
- Cinematography: Les Young
- Running time: 30 minutes (DVD Version)
- Production companies: LWT; RM Associates

Original release
- Network: ITV (CITV)
- Release: 4 April – 25 April 1995

Johnny and the Dead is a British television series released in four parts in 1995, It is based on a famous novel of the same name by Terry Pratchett. It premiered on ITV before its DVD release as a full-length film by Home Warner. It was broadcast on television channels around the world. Johnny and the Dead was written and directed by Gerald Fox, produced by Peter Pearson, executive producer Melvyn Bragg, starring Andrew Falvey, Jotham Annan, George Baker and Brian Blessed and Jane Lapotaire.

== Plot ==
Johnny and the Dead is a comedy, family, fantasy genre fiction film based on the bestselling author Terry Pratchett's novel about a young boy's supernatural adventure. This TV series is in four parts Johnny and the Dead Part 1, Part 2, Part 3, and Part 4

== Cast ==
- Jotham Annan as Yo-Less
- George Baker as Alderman
- Brian Blessed as William Stickers
- Mark Chapman as The Surveyor
- Paul Child as BigMac
- Andrew Falvey as Johnny Maxwell
- David Gooderson as Councillor
- John Grillo as Antonio Vicenti
- Harry Landis as Solomon Einstein
- Jane Lapotaire as Mrs. Sylvia Liberty / Ms Liberty
- Ray Lonnen as James Bowler
- Tina Martin as Mrs. Maxwell
- Charlie Watts as Wobbler
- Geoffrey Whitehead as Addison Fletcher
- Arthur Whybrow as Johnny's Grandad

== Production ==
Johnny and the Dead is a family film based on Terry Pratchett's best-selling novel about a young boy's supernatural adventure.

== Series overview ==
Series	Episodes	Originally released	
Series	Episodes	First released	Last released
1	4	4 April 1995	25 April 1995
