= Gerald Fox =

- Born: 14 July 1963 (age 63); South Africa
- Education: Harrow School; Oxford University; Harvard University
- Occupations: Filmmaker, producer and artist
- Years active: 1989–present
- Awards: BAFTA
- Website: gerryfox.com

Gerald Fox (born 14 July 1963) is a director, producer and artist. He has directed arts documentary films and programs which were broadcast in the UK, South Africa and the US. His moving image artworks have been showcased in solo and group exhibitions across a variety of galleries and museums, including Zabludowicz 176 Gallery.

He has worked on various platforms, from ITV's The South Bank Show. Sky Arts, BBC and Channel 4 and even theatrically for Curzon, Picturehouse, and UK & US independent cinemas His work has also been featured in art museums, including The Tate, Royal Academy, The Met, MOMA, National Gallery of Art (Washington), Uffizi and Centre Pompidou. Gerald's notable documentaries have covered an array of subjects, including Gilbert and George, (BAFTA), Claes Oldenburg, Christian Boltanski, Gerhard Richter and Janine Jansen (Golden Prague). Gerald is a philanthropist and has served as BFI Member Governor from 2018 to 2022. He won the Inyathelo Award for International Philanthropy in South Africa in 2012 along with his sister Jacqueline Fox.

== Early life and education ==
Fox was born on 14 July 1963 in South Africa. He was educated in Oxford where he directed a short film based on Samuel Johnson's story, 'The Fountains.' After completing his studies, Gerry set out to travel the world, creating a captivating film titled 'Man in 6 Movements'.

== Career ==
In 1989, Gerald Fox began his career with the arts program, The South Bank Show.

He produced his first piece on the concert pianist, John Ogdon In 1992, he created and edited his own program for younger viewers called Opening Shot, which won awards at the Chicago International Film Festival and New York Festival.

One of the documentaries Fox co-directed for the series, Opening shot: Out of the Dump was about destitute child photographers living on a rubbish dump in Guatemala City. This film won both the Adult Jury Award and Children's Jury Award for Best Documentary at The Chicago International Children's Film Festival in 1994. In the same year he directed and produced a documentary film called Sitkovetsky. Fox wrote, produced, and directed Johnny and the Dead, a drama series for LWT productions in 1995. In the same year, Fox produced a documentary on Swedish-American pop sculptor Claes Oldenburg. The film offered a glimpse into Oldenburg's artistic world, showcasing his installations featuring oversized replicas of everyday objects.

Fox's two-part documentary, The Fundamental Gilbert and George was released in 1996/7. The film chronicles the life and works of artist duo Gilbert Prousch and George Passmore, with their formal appearance and manner, performance art, and photo-based works. The Fundamental Gilbert and George won a BAFTA.

In 1999, Fox directed a TV documentary called Thomas Ades: Music for the 21st Century based on composer Thomas Ades. In the same year, he directed a documentary where Melvyn Bragg interviews Warren Beatty. He directed a documentary film based on the impact on AIDS in the Sub - Saharan Africa in 2001 known as Together we can: South Africa's Youth against AIDS.

In 2004, Fox directed a documentary called Leaving Home, Coming Home: A Portrait of Robert Frank based on the life of Robert Frank. The film captures Frank reflecting on a lifetime of image making that produced The Americans. The film premiered at Rotterdam and TriBeCa Film Festivals. It won the Grierson Award for Best Arts Documentary, the RTS Best Arts Film, and The Grand Prize at FIFA, Montréal.

In 2006, Fox made a film titled George Michael: I'm Your Man, which captured the singer's journey back to touring on the "25 Live" tour. The following year, Fox directed documentary for the South Bank Show series titled Marianne Faithful: A Life in Song.

In 2011, Fox directed and produced Mother's Milk. It was based on the novel by Edward St Aubyn and starred Adrian Dunbar, Jack Davenport and Margaret Tyzack. It won eight awards at the Monaco International Film Festival, including Best Film.

In 2012, Fox, in collaboration with producer Jacqueline Fox created a film titled Mandela: The World That Made Him for SABC 2. It depicts Mandela's childhood activities. In 2014, he directed a documentary Marc Quinn Life support based on artist Marc Quinn.

In 2017, Fox made a documentary Bill Viola: The Road to St. Paul's. This film showcases the life and work of Bill Viola, a video artist, and his wife and collaborator Kira Perov, as they navigate a twelve-year journey to create two permanent video installations, Mary and Martyrs, in London's St Paul's Cathedral.

In 2018, Fox worked on a new project, Force of Nature Natalia, a year-long portrait of dancer Natalia Osipova. Co-presented by Asterisk Films, Bird and Carrot, it offers access to Osipova's personal archive. In 2019, he directed the documentary Burning Man: Art on Fire, which was released in 2020. This film tells the tale of the art pieces that take center stage in the annual celebration of Burning Man.

In 2020, Fox directed another documentary titled Janine Jansen: Falling for Stradivari which was released in 2021. The documentary won the Czech Television Award at the Golden Prague Awards 2021 and was nominated for the Official Selection for the 40th FIFA.

== Filmography ==
=== Film ===
Year	Title	Director	Producer
1993	Sitkovetsky	Yes	Yes
2001	Together we can: South Africa's Youth against AIDS	Yes	Yes
2004	Leaving Home, Coming Home	Yes	Yes
2006	George Michael: I'm Your Man	Yes	Yes
2007	Marianne Faithful a life in song	Yes	Yes
2008	Billy Joel	Yes	Yes
2008	Cildo Mereles	Yes	Yes
2011	Mother's Milk	Yes	Yes
2012	Mandela, the world that made him	Yes	Yes
2014	Marc Quinn: Making Waves	Yes	Yes
2017	Bill Viola the road to St Paul	Yes	Yes
2020	Force of Nature Natalia	Yes	Yes
2020	Burning Man: Art on Fire	Yes	Yes
2021	Janine Jansen: Falling of Stradivari	Yes	Yes
2026	Kinaesthesia	Yes	Yes

=== Television ===
Year	Title	Director
1994	Christian Boltanski: Dead or Alive	Yes
1995	Opening Shot	Yes
1995	Johnny and the Dead (TV series)	Yes
1996	Claes Oldenburg (documentary)	Yes
1997	The Fundamental of Gilbert and George	Yes
1999	Thomas Ades: Music for the 21st Century	Yes
1999	Warren Beatty	Yes
2003	Gerhard Richter (Documentary)	Yes
2003	Sitting Ducks	Yes
2006	Marianne Faithful: A Life in Song	Yes

== Artworks and exhibitions ==
Fox is also a film artist who has done work on moving image and multi-screen film installations. In 2008, Fox exhibited his first collection at the 176 The Zabludowicz Collection Gallery in Camden, London. titled Living London. In that same year, Fox also created Favela Descending, a six-screen installation presented at the Concrete and Glass Festival in Shoreditch, London. This installation takes viewers on a journey through Favela Minera, one of the most violent slums in Rio de Janeiro, Brazil accompanied by music by Ned Bigham, the visions created by Favela Descending provide a unique experience of life in a Rio slum In 2009, Fox show the city of Venice through his cinematic multi-screen installation titled "Venice in Venice", which was showcased at Palazzo Dona during the Venice Biennale. The artwork portrayed the daily life, rituals, and traditions of the city, capturing its essence in a colorful and edgy display of colliding and contrasting images. In 2010, Fox showcased his first solo exhibition at Eleven Fine Art in London, titled Venetian Impressions. The exhibition featured a series of video works inspired by 19th-century paintings of Venice, including works by artists such as Manet, Monet, and Renoir, all featuring gondolas in the city's canals In 2017, Fox exhibited "Legacies: JMW Turner and Contemporary Art Practices" at New Art Gallery in Walsall, Birmingham. The exhibition was a group showcase that explored the influence of British artist, J.M.W Turner on contemporary art. He also exhibited "The Eternal Idol," a four-screen piece of Rodin's sculpture was employed by two live models.
