= Justine Waddell =

British actress (born 1975)

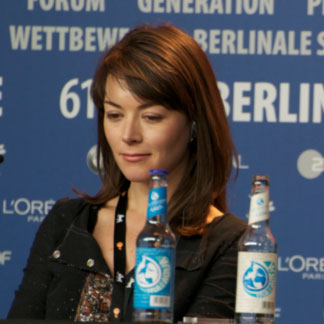
- Waddell at the Berlin Film Festival 2011
- Born: 4 November 1975 (age 50); Johannesburg, Transvaal Province, South Africa
- Occupations: Actress; Producer
- Years active: 1996–2011

Justine Waddell (born 4 November 1975) is a South African-British film producer and actress. She played roles in the 2006 film The Fall and 2005 film Chaos as well as Tess in the 1998 LWT adaptation of Tess of the d'Urbervilles and Estella in the 1999 BBC adaptation of Great Expectations. Justine is also the founder and director of the streaming platform Klassiki.

== Early life ==
Waddell was born in Johannesburg, South Africa. Her father, Gordon Waddell (1937–2012), was a Scottish rugby union player who captained the Scottish national team and played for the British and Irish Lions. He later became a Progressive Party Member of Parliament in South Africa, and a director of Anglo American PLC. Her grandfather, Herbert Waddell (1902–1988), also played rugby for Scotland and the Lions. Waddell moved with her family to Scotland when she was eleven. Four years later they moved to London. Waddell is the only member of her family to take up a career in acting. She read Social and Political Science at Emmanuel College, Cambridge, which allowed her to take time off from her studies to pursue her career.

== Career ==
Waddell has divided her work between stage and screen. Amongst her roles to date have been her performance as Sasha opposite Ralph Fiennes and Bill Paterson in the Almeida Theatre's London production of Ivanov (1997), Countess Nordston in Anna Karenina (1997), Tess in a London Weekend Television production of Tess of the D'Urbervilles (1998), Julia Bertram in Mansfield Park (1999), Estella in Great Expectations, Nina in a Royal Shakespeare Company production of The Seagull by Anton Chekhov (2000), for which she was nominated for an Ian Charleson award and Molly Gibson in the television mini series Wives and Daughters for which she won a Broadcasting Press Guild Best Actress award. She played Mary Heller in the American film, Dracula 2000. In 2002 she starred in The One and Only. She won a Prism Award for Best Actress for her portrayal of Natalie Wood in The Mystery of Natalie Wood, a 2004 TV movie directed by Peter Bogdanovich. In 2005 Waddell starred alongside Jason Statham and Ryan Phillipe in Chaos. During the same year, she co-starred with Lee Pace in Tarsem Singh's The Fall.

In 2011, Waddell had a starring role in Mishen, which is a Russian science fiction film directed by Alexander Zeldovich and written by Vladimir Sorokin. In the early 2020s Waddell turned to screenwriting and producing films. She produced Force Of Nature Natalia (2019) about Royal Ballet principal dancer Natalia Osipova. She also produced Janine Jansen: Falling for Stradivari about Janine Jansen and Antonio Pappano and their journey to record an album on 12 of the world’s rarest Stradivari violins. The film won the prestigious Czech Television Prize at the 2021 Golden Prague Awards. Both films were directed by BAFTA and Grierson winning documentary maker Gerry Fox.

In 2026 she wrote the screenplay for and produced Virginia Woolf’s Night & Day, based on Virginia Woolf’s second novel.

She is also the founder and director of the streaming platform Klassiki, a curated collection of the best of Eastern European cinema from Eastern Europe, the Caucasus, and Central Asia whilst also spotlighting the countries of the former Soviet Union.

== Filmography ==
Film
| Year | Title | Role | Notes |
|---|---|---|---|
| 1997 | Anna Karenina | Countess Nordston | |
| 1998 | The Misadventures of Margaret | Young Girl | |
| 1999 | Mansfield Park | Julia Bertram | |
| 2000 | Dracula 2000 | Mary Heller/Mary Van Helsing | |
| 2002 | The One and Only | Stevie | |
| 2006 | Chaos | Detective Teddy Galloway | |
| 2006 | The Fall | Nurse Evelyn | |
| 2007 | Thr3e | Jennifer Peters | |
| 2011 | Killing Bono | Danielle | |
| 2011 | Target (Mishen) | Zoe "Zoya" | Russian production |
| 2011 | The Enemy Within | Jean Kerr | Original title The Real American – Joe McCarthy |
| 2019 | Force of Nature Natalia | —N/a | Producer |
| 2021 | Janine Jansen: Falling for Stradivari | —N/a | Producer |
| 2026 | Virginia Woolf's Night and Day | —N/a | Writer and Producer |

Television
| Year | Title | Role | Notes |
|---|---|---|---|
| 1997 | The Moth | Millie Thorman | |
| 1997 | The Woman in White | Laura Fairlie | |
| 1998 | Tess of the D'Urbervilles | Tess Durbeyfield | |
| 1999 | Great Expectations | Estella | |
| 1999 | Wives and Daughters | Molly Gibson | |
| 2004 | The Mystery of Natalie Wood | Natalie Wood | |

== Awards and nominations ==
| Year | Award | Category | Work | Result | Ref |
|---|---|---|---|---|---|
| 2000 | Broadcasting Press Guild | Best Actress | Wives and Daughters | Won | |
| 2005 | Prism Awards | Best Performance in a TV Movie or Miniseries | The Mystery of Natalie Wood | Won | |
