= Johnny and the Bomb =

Book by Terry Pratchett

- First edition
- Author: Terry Pratchett
- Original title: Johnny and the Bomb
- Cover artist: Larry Rostant
- Language: English
- Series: Johnny Maxwell Trilogy
- Genre: Children's literature, Science fiction
- Publisher: Doubleday (London)
- Publication date: 1996
- Publication place: United Kingdom
- Media type: book
- Pages: 263
- ISBN: 0-385-40670-3
- OCLC: 37732352
- Preceded by: Johnny and the Dead

Johnny and the Bomb is a 1996 novel by Terry Pratchett. It is the third novel to feature Johnny Maxwell and his friends, and deals with the rules and consequences of time travel. The first two novels in the Johnny Maxwell Trilogy are Only You Can Save Mankind (1992) and Johnny and the Dead (1993).

The action of the novel revolves around a bomb dropped during the Blitz in World War II in which Johnny's inoffensive home town of Blackbury was hit by an airstrike intended for a nearby town containing an industrial complex.

== Plot summary ==
After Johnny Maxwell, a boy in his early teens, finds Mrs Tachyon, an old bag lady, by a cinema he discovers that her trolley is in fact a time machine. He goes back to his town, Blackbury, during the time of The Blitz with his friends Stephen (aka Wobbler), Bigmac, Kirsty and Yo-less (possibly because Johnny has been obsessing about the destruction of Paradise Street in a German raid). Wobbler gets left behind in 1941, and when they return for him, Johnny tries to prevent the deaths caused in the raid.

== Characters ==
Johnny Maxwell – Johnny is the protagonist.

Stephen 'Wobbler' Johnson – (Walter in the TV series) Johnny's best friend and the second main character in the book. He is overweight and heavily into computers, an expert at piracy. He wants to be a "nerd", but they would not let him join. It is his considered opinion that Johnny is "mental". His real name is Stephen Johnson. In Johnny and the Bomb, Wobbler gets stuck in 1941 and grows up to be a billionaire calling himself Sir John and Bigmac is locked up in the Tower of London as a Nazi spy, but, due to the time travel and multiple timelines involved, where and if this happens is questionable. Wobbler returns successfully from 1941 and Bigmac is freed from the Tower of London.

Simon 'Bigmac' Wrigley – An asthmatic skinhead who is deeply embarrassed by his interest in maths. He lives with his brother in a rundown tower block on the edge of Blackbury. He is not exactly a criminal but has a confused grasp of car ownership.

Yo-less – A "technically" black boy, nicknamed by Johnny because he does not say "Yo!" His interests include Star Trek, train spotting, Morris dancing, and brass band music. He only said 'check it out' in the supermarket, and the only person he ever called a mother was his mother. Yo-less said it was racial stereotyping to say all black kids acted like that but, however you looked at it, Yo-less had been born with a defective cool.

Kirsty – The girl of the group, unlike the rest of the gang, Kirsty is a highly organised person who knows exactly where she wants to go in life. She is highly intelligent but has very poor people skills, something she views as a character flaw in everyone else. She is trying to get Johnny's life organised since he is clearly incapable of doing it himself, but has not realised that he does not especially want his life organised. He finds her very easy to talk to since she never listens.

== Reception ==
The book received positive reviews. Kirkus Reviews called the book "Complex, funny and, above all, impassioned." School Library Journal praised the plot and humor of the novel. A reviewer for Horn Book Magazine wrote: "With plenty of loopy logic, off-the-cuff philosophy, and hectic action, this trilogy cap-off is pure fun."

== Television series ==
In January 2006 the BBC aired a three-part television adaptation of Johnny and the Bomb, starring George MacKay, Zoë Wanamaker, Frank Finlay and Keith Barron.

=== Differences between book and TV series ===
In the book, Johnny changes history so that no-one dies in the Paradise Street bombing. However, the TV series has this as the original history, which the gang inadvertently changes on their first visit to the past. In the history thus created, Simon was jailed in the Tower of London for being a Nazi spy though he is later released; Johnny's grandmother was killed, meaning he no longer exists. When Johnny faces his own grandfather, he mistakes him for an intruder. She is then saved due to the alarm going off and Johnny exists again.

A smaller change is that in the series, Stephen (Wobbler) is renamed Walter, later Sir Walter.
