= Gordon Waddell =

British Lions & Scotland international rugby union & politician

- Born: Gordon Herbert Waddell; 12 April 1937 Glasgow, Scotland
- Died: 13 August 2012 (aged 75) London, England
- School: St. Mary's School, Melrose; Fettes College
- University: Pembroke College, Cambridge; Stanford University

Rugby union career
Amateur team(s)
Years	Team	Apps	(Points)
1958-61	Cambridge University RUFC		
–	Devonport Services RFC		
–	Royal Navy		
International career
Years	Team	Apps	(Points)
1957-60	Barbarians	12	
1957-62	Scotland	18	
1959-62	British and Irish Lions		

Gordon Herbert Waddell (12 April 1937 – 13 August 2012) was a Scottish rugby union player, a South African politician, and the son of Herbert Waddell. He played for Scotland, the Barbarians and on two British and Irish Lions tours. In fact he is only one of two Scottish stand offs to be a double Lion, the other being Finn Russell. He had 18 caps between 1957 and 1962 - this record for a Scotland fly-half was only later broken by John Rutherford. He played 12 times for the Barbarians between 1957 and 1960, scoring in three matches including their 1958 match against East Africa in Nairobi on 28 May 1958. In 1962 he was the controlling influence in Scotland's first win in Wales since the 1930s, a feat not repeated for another twenty years.

== Education ==
Waddell was born in Glasgow. He was educated at St. Mary's School, Melrose and Fettes College, Edinburgh before attending Pembroke College, Cambridge, where he obtained a BA degree in Law. Waddell also later studied for an MBA at Stanford University.

== Rugby Union career ==
Between 1958 and 1961 Waddell won 3 blues for Cambridge at Fly Half. The 1961 Cambridge side is considered one of the finest ever Varsity Match sides and they are still to this day the only unbeaten Varsity XV in history-).

"When this junketing band of Cambridge ancients beat Oxford in the 80th contest on 11 December 1961 they established a timeless record which proclaims them still as the finest Varsity match XV in history as the only one ever to remain unbeaten throughout their season – P14 W14, points for 249, against 49. It is particularly notable for in those days both universities would prepare for Twickenham with a string of matches against the grandest clubs in the land, full‑strength teams packed with international players from such as Cardiff, Newport, Gloucester, Leicester, Coventry, Bedford, Harlequins, and Northampton. The Cambridge immortals of '61 beat them all."

Waddell was selected in his first year out of school while doing National Service, where he became a Royal Marine Commando, to play rugby for Devonport Services and the Royal Navy including the Calcutta Cup game in 1957. Between 1957 and 1962 Waddell won 18 caps for Scotland, 5 of which he won as Captain including the Test Match against South Africa in Port Elizabeth in 1960. In 1962 he was the controlling influence in Scotland's first win in Wales since the 1930s, a feat not repeated for another twenty years. During his 18 caps he was never dropped, although he had to leave because of injury - this record for a Scotland fly-half was only later broken by John Rutherford. Waddell and his father Herbert Waddell are one of the very few examples of a father and son having played for the same teams in the same position. Both were Fly Halves for Scotland and the British Lions.

Waddell twice toured with the British Isles - to New Zealand in 1959 when university examinations and injury limited his appearances to ten (including seven tries) and South Africa in 1962 when his 12 appearances included the first test and he also scored 17 points. He remains the only Scottish Fly Half to be a double Lion.

He played 12 times for the Barbarians between 1957 and 1960, scoring in three matches including their 1958 match against East Africa in Nairobi on 28 May 1958. He first played for the Barbarians against Ulster in 1957 while his last appearance was against Leicester in 1960.

== Business career ==
Waddell was a Director of E. Oppenheimer & Son Ltd, 1967–87. Executive Director of the Anglo American Corporation of South Africa Ltd. 1971–87. He was Chairman of Johannesburg Consolidated Investments Ltd 1981–87, Rustenburg Platinum Mines Ltd, 1981–87, South African Breweries Ltd, 1984–87, Fairway Group PLC (formerly Fairway London), 1989–98, Ryan GP (formerly Digger) 1991–95; Gartmore Scotland Investment Trust 1991–2001; Tor Investment Trust, 1992–96; Mersey Docks and Harbour Company 1992–2006; Shanks Group PLC (formerly Shanks & McEwan) Director Cadbury Schweppes 1988–97, Scottish National Trust 1988–96. London and Strathclyde Trust 1989–96.

== Political career ==
Waddell was elected to the South African Parliament in April 1974 by winning the constituency of Johannesburg North for the Progressive Party. Waddell was one of seven new Progressive Party MPs who won election to Parliament in 1974, supporting Helen Suzman who had been the sole opposition MP to the National Party for 13 years. Waddell acted as spokesperson for Economic Affairs for the Progressive Federal Party during his term in Parliament.

He was responsible for instigating the special congress held over the weekend of 3 September 1979, which led to the ousting of party leader Colin Eglin and the election of Frederik van Zyl Slabbert.

== Personal life ==
His daughter is the actress Justine Waddell.
