= That Reminds Me (radio) =

BBC Radio 4 programme (1999–2003)

That Reminds Me was a series of programmes broadcast on BBC Radio 4 where someone connected with comedy talks about their life for thirty minutes in front of a live audience. The series ran from 1999 to 2003. It was produced by Claire Jones.

== Episode list ==
=== Series 1 ===
- S01 E01 - Barry Cryer (25 March 1999)
- S01 E02 - Barry Took (1 April 1999)
- S01 E03 - Nicholas Parsons (8 April 1999)
- S01 E04 - Peter Jones (15 April 1999)
- S01 E05 - Bill Pertwee (22 April 1999)
- S01 E06 - Ned Sherrin (29 April 1999)

=== Series 2 ===
- S02 E01 - Roy Hudd (26 September 2000)
- S02 E02 - Maureen Lipman (3 October 2000)
- S02 E03 - Humphrey Lyttelton (10 October 2000)
- S02 E04 - Sir Clement Freud (17 October 2000)
- S02 E05 - Victor Spinetti (24 October 2000)
- S02 E06 - Dora Bryan (31 October 2000)

=== Series 3 ===
- S03 E01 - George Melly (20 November 2001)
- S03 E02 - John Fortune (27 November 2001)
- S03 E03 - Sheila Steafel (4 December 2001)
- S03 E04 - Jack Douglas (11 December 2001)
- S03 E05 - Warren Mitchell (18 December 2001)
- S03 E06 - John Inman (25 December 2001)

=== Series 4 ===
- S04 E01 - Ludovic Kennedy (1 October 2002)
- S04 E02 - Andrew Sachs (8 October 2002)
- S04 E03 - Melvyn Hayes (15 October 2002)
- S04 E04 - Pam Ayres (22 October 2002)
- S04 E05 - Peter Sallis (29 October 2002)
- S04 E06 - John Mortimer (5 November 2002)

=== Series 5 ===
- S05 E01 - Keith Barron (19 August 2003)
- S05 E02 - Nerys Hughes (26 August 2003)
- S05 E03 - Dudley Sutton (2 September 2003)
- S05 E04 - Charles Collingwood (9 September 2003)
- S05 E05 - Liz Fraser (16 September 2003)
- S05 E06 - Richard Griffiths (20 September 2003)
