= Geoffrey Whitehead =

English actor (born 1939)

- Born: 1 October 1939 (age 86); Grenoside, Sheffield, England
- Education: Royal Academy of Dramatic Art
- Occupation: Actor
- Years active: 1962–present
- Relatives: Celina Hinchcliffe (niece)

Geoffrey Whitehead (born 1 October 1939) is an English actor. He has appeared in a range of television, film and radio roles.

== Early life ==
Whitehead was born on 1 October 1939 in Grenoside, Sheffield. After his father was killed in the Second World War, he received an RAF benevolent grant which sent him to a minor public school. He later attended the Royal Academy of Dramatic Art, where he became friends with fellow student John Thaw.

== Career ==
Whitehead's television appearances include Bulldog Breed (1962); Z-Cars (1964–1965 and 1972–1975), playing two different regular characters; Some Mothers Do 'Ave 'Em (1973); The Sweeney, Season 2 Episode 6 "Trap" (1975); Thriller (1 episode, 1974); Wodehouse Playhouse, ("Rodney Fails to Qualify"); The Doll, 1975; Robin's Nest (1977); Sherlock Holmes and Doctor Watson (1979–1980, as Sherlock Holmes); "Gerald Pinkerton" in Pinkerton's Progress (1983); Peter the Great (1986); Chelmsford 123 (1988–1990); War and Remembrance (1988); Second Thoughts (1991–1994); The House of Eliott (1991); Executive Stress; Little Britain; and The Worst Week of My Life.

His radio roles include featuring in the third and fourth episodes of the fifth series of the BBC Radio 4 comedy series Old Harry's Game in the role of Roland Kingworthy, as Prior Robert in the 1980s BBC radio dramatisations of Cadfael, as John Barsad in the radio dramatisation of Charles Dickens' A Tale of Two Cities and as Justice Wargrave in the BBC Radio 4 dramatisation of Agatha Christie's And Then There Were None on 13 November 2010. He has starred on BBC radio in many comic roles, including Bleak Expectations, featuring as five entire families between 2007 and 2012. He appeared in two series of the BBC remake Reggie Perrin as Reggie's father-in-law, William.

Whitehead's film appearances have included The Raging Moon (1971), Kidnapped (1971), the vengeful woodsman in And Now the Screaming Starts! (1972), S.O.S. Titanic (1979) as shipbuilder Thomas Andrews, Inside the Third Reich (1982), Shooting Fish (1997) and Love/Loss (2010).

In 2011, Whitehead joined the cast of Not Going Out in its fourth series, playing Geoffrey Adams, the father of Lucy and Tim. This character had been recurring since 2007, but had previously been played by Timothy West. He played the role until 2023.

In 2013, Whitehead appeared on Comic Relief playing the vicar in a Simon Cowell wedding sketch.

He played Dr Fagan in Evelyn Waugh's Decline and Fall on radio, first broadcast in 2015.

From 2015 to 2019, Whitehead played Mr (Wilburn) Newbold in BBC One's Still Open All Hours.

== Selected filmography ==
=== Television ===
Year	Title	Role	Notes
1962	Bulldog Breed	Billy Broadbent	2 episodes
1963	The Plane Makers	Jeremy Coles	Episode: "A Question of Sources"
1963- 1965	Armchair Theatre	Anthony Shields/ Paul/ Andrew Lafone	3 episodes
1964	The Avengers	Rt. Hon. Lucien Ffordsham	Episode: "Trojan Horse"
1964- 1965	Z-Cars	PC Baker	29 episodes
1966	Redcap	Private Oglivy	Episode: "Paterson's Private Army"
1968	The Wednesday Play	Father James	Story: "A Bit of Crucifixion, Father"
1968	Never Mind the Quality, Feel the Width	Station Constable	Episode: "I'm Dreaming of a Kosher Christmas"
1969	The Avengers	Carter	Episode: "Pandora"
1969	The Gold Robbers	Peter Conroy	Episode: "Rough Trade"
1969	Hadleigh	Mark Foster	Episode: "If You Can't Beat 'Em"
1970	Manhunt	Captain Speigel	2 episodes
1971	Public Eye	Alan Lipton	Episode: "Slip Home in the Dark"
1971	The Rivals of Sherlock Holmes	Harry Parsket	Story: "The Horse of the Invisible"
1971	The Troubleshooters	McNab	Episode: "Monopoly with Real Money"
1971	Justice	Major Bilton	Episode: "To Help an Old School Friend"
1972	Upstairs, Downstairs	Captain Axel Ryttsen	Episode: "The Swedish Tiger"
1972	Man of Straw	Friedrich Kienast	Episode: "A Suitable Match"
1972- 1975	Z-Cars	Sgt. Miller	22 episodes
1973	Some Mothers Do 'Ave 'Em	Osborne	Episode: "Love Thy Neighbour"
1973	Justice	Brian Bex	Episode: "One for the Road"
1973	Owen M.D.	Dr. Hugo	Episode: "You Don't Get Me"
1974	Thriller	Keston	Story: "Im the Girl He Wants to Kill"
1975	Crown Court	Geoffrey Appleton	Episode: "The Quest - Part 1"
1975	A Legacy	Gustavus von Felden	4 episodes
1975	Wodehouse Playhouse	Rodney Spelvin	Story: Rodney Fails to Qualify"
1975	The Sweeney	Mills	Episode: "Trap"
1975	The Doll	Claude Matty	3 episodes
1977	Robin's Nest	Anthony	Episode: "A Little Competition"
1977- 1978	The Foundation	Ronnie Bartlett	25 episodes
1979	Thomas and Sarah	Sir George Truscott	Episode: "A Day at the Metropole"
1979- 1980	Sherlock Holmes and Doctor Watson	Sherlock Holmes	24 episodes
1983	The Cleopatras	Scipio Africanus	Episode: "145 BC"
1983	Pinkerton's Progress	Gerald Pinkerton	6 episodes
1983	Reilly: Ace of Spies	Lubinsky	Episode: "Deadnoughts and Crosses"
1983	The Consultant	Clement	4 episodes
1984	Scarecrow and Mrs. King	The Mongoose	Episode: "To Catch a Mongoose"
1986	Peter the Great	Prince Vasily Golitsyn	4 episodes (mini-series)
1986	The Fourth Floor	Monroe	3 episodes (mini-series)
1986	Kit Curran	Bumstead	Episode: "The Lucky Break"
1986	Middle English	Mr. Magnus	4 episodes
1987	A Small Problem	Prison Governor	Episode: "Curfew"
1988	The Return of Shelley	Consultant	Episode: "Emergency Ward 9"
1988	Executive Stress	Peter Davenport	3 episodes
1988- 1990	Chelmsford 123	Viatorus	3 episodes
1989	War and Remembrance	Albert Speer	Episode: "Part XI"
1989	Frederick Forsyth Presents	Edwards	Story: "A Casualty of War"
1990	Colin's Sandwich	The Consultant	Episode: "Frank"
1991	Minder	Supt. Roden	Episode: "The Coach That Came in from the Cold"
1991	Gone to the Dogs	Headmaster	1 episode
1991	Red Fox	British Ambassador	2 episodes
1991	Strauss Dynasty	Halmi	8 episodes (mini-series)
1991- 1994	Second Thoughts	Richard	32 episodes
1992	The House of Eliott	Edward Maddox	1 episode
1992	Jewels	King George	2 episodes
1992- 1994	Between the Lines	D.A.C. Flint	3 episodes
1993	Drop the Dead Donkey	Lawyer 1	Episode: "Sally's Libel"
1993	Poirot	Xavier St. Alard	Episode: "The Chocolate Box"
1993	Demob	Brigadier	1 episode
1994	Faith	Sandy	2 episodes
1995	Johnny and the Dead	Addison Fletcher	4 episodes
1995	Look at the State We're In!	Howard QC	5 episodes
1995	The Adventures of Young Indiana Jones	Werner	Episode: "Attack of the Hawkmen"
1996	Soldier, Soldier	Mr. John Forsyth	Episode: "River Deep"
1996- 1997	Paul Merton in Galton and Simpson's...	Various	5 episodes
1997	Q.E.D.	Justin Sanderson	Episode: "Cause of Death"
1998	The Ambassador	Rupert (The P.U.S.)	Episode: "Refuge"
1999	People Like Us	Chief Inspector Carpenter	Episode: "The Police Officer"
2000	Chambers	Christopher Wakely	Episode: "The Masons"
2001	Time Gentlemen Please	Vicky's Dad	2 episodes
2003	Fortysomething	Maurice Kemp	1 episode
2003	Absolute Power	Snobby Clubman	Episode: "Country Life"
2004	The Rotters' Club	Headmaster	3 episodes (mini-series)
2004- 2006	The Worst Week of My Life	Dick Cook	17 episodes
2005	The Robinsons	Marshall	1 episode
2005	My Hero	Headmaster	Episode: "How Green Was My Ollie"
2005	Midsomer Murders	Dr. Gregory Ransom	Episode: "Second Sight"
2006	Mayo	Crytch	Episode: "Requiem for a Dove"
2008	Little Dorrit	Doctor	5 episodes (mini-series)
2008	Burn Up!	Chairman of the Board	1 episode
2009	The Fixer	Bob Winters	1 episode
2009- 2010	Reggie Perrin	William	11 episodes
2011- 2012	The Royal Bodyguard	Col. Dennis Whittington	6 episodes
2011- 2023	Not Going Out	Geoffrey	29 episodes
2014	Midsomer Murders	Giles Wilding	Episode: "The Flying Club"
2014	Doctors	Tom Vaesey	Episode: "Two Roads"
2015- 2019	Still Open All Hours	Mr. Newbold	31 episodes
2017	Upstart Crow	Hunt	Episode: "I Know Thee Not, Old Man"

=== Film ===
Year	Title	Role	Notes
1966	The Christmas Tree	Policeman	
1971	The Raging Moon	Harold	
1971	Kidnapped	Lt. Duncansby	
1973	And Now the Screaming Starts!	Woodman/ Silas	
1979	S.O.S. Titanic	Thomas Andrews	TV movie
1982	Inside the Third Reich	Xavier Dorsch	TV movie
1989	That Summer of White Roses	Cinovik	
1997	Shooting Fish	Horse Owner	
2002	Jeffrey Archer: The Truth	Chessington	TV movie
2007	Christmas at the Riviera	Godfrey	TV movie
2008	Margaret Thatcher: The Long Walk to Finchley	Entwistle/ Lt Col Allason	TV movie
2010	Love/ Loss	Bill	

=== Radio ===
- Cabin Pressure – Mr Birling
- Old Harry's Game – Roland Kingworthy
- Ayres on the Air – Gordon
- Weak at the Top – Sir Marcus
- Rigor Mortis – Professor Donaldson
- Ed Reardon's Week – Stan
- Potting On – Gordon Grant, radio husband of comedian and poet Pam Ayres
- Bleak Expectations – the Hardthrasher, Sternbeater, Whackwallop, Grimpunch and Clampvulture families
- Cadfael – Prior Robert
- Troy – Nikanor
- The Genuine Particle – Shale
- Hair in the Gate – Brian Melvyn
- The Architects – Sir Lucien
- The Skull Beneath the Skin – Inspector Grogan
- Adaptations of Terry Pratchett's novels Eric and Mort - Death
- The Newly Discovered Casebook of Sherlock Holmes – Professor Moriarty
- Adaptation of House of Cards - Henry 'Hal' Collingridge, Prime Minister
- Adaptation of Kind Hearts and Coronets - Prison Governor

== Personal life ==
Whitehead is the uncle of broadcaster Celina Hinchcliffe. He is a Sheffield Wednesday supporter.
