= Pam Ayres =

British poet, songwriter and presenter (born 1947)

Pam Ayres MBE
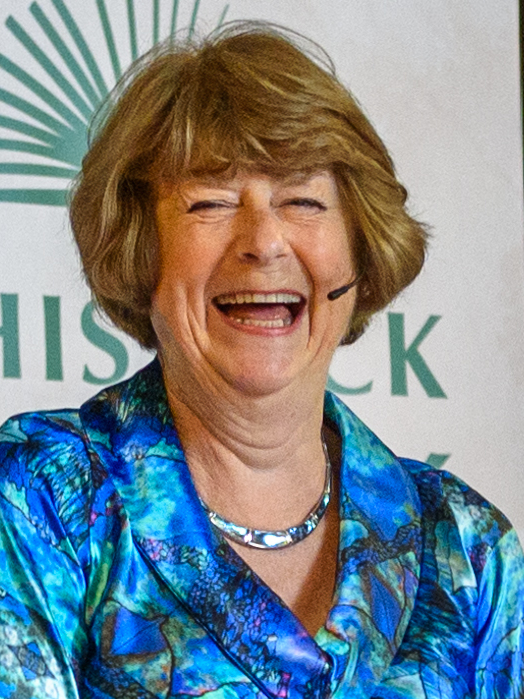
- Ayres in 2022
- Born: Pamela Ayres; 14 March 1947 (age 79); Stanford in the Vale, Berkshire, England
- Occupations: Poet, songwriter, presenter of radio and television programmes
- Spouse: Dudley Russell (m. 1982)
- Children: 2
- Writing career
- Genre: Comic verse
- Website: www.pamayres.com

Pamela Ayres MBE (born 14 March 1947) is a British poet, comedian, songwriter and presenter of radio and television programmes. Her 1975 appearance on the television talent show Opportunity Knocks led to appearances on other TV and radio shows, a one-woman touring stage show and performing before Queen Elizabeth II.

== Early life ==
Pam Ayres was born in Stanford in the Vale, Berkshire (now administered as part of Oxfordshire), the youngest of six children (having four elder brothers and a sister) of Stanley and Phyllis Ayres. Her father worked for 44 years as a linesman for the Southern Electricity Board, having been a sergeant in the Grenadier Guards during the Second World War. Ayres considered her upbringing "a country childhood"; she was raised in one of a row of small council houses.

After leaving Faringdon Secondary School at the age of 15, she joined the Civil Service as a clerical assistant and worked at the Army (RAOC) Central Ordnance Depot in Bicester. She soon left and signed up for the Women's Royal Air Force (WRAF), where she trained as a Plotter Air Photographer, working at JARIC in a drawing office dealing with operational maps. While serving in the air force, she gained O-level passes in English language and English literature and began her career as an entertainer. On leaving the WRAF, she went through a number of jobs, before ending up at Smiths Industries, Witney, where she spent six years, working as a "Confidential Secretary". While at Smiths, Ayres began performing at a local folk club, and this led eventually to an invitation to read on BBC Radio Oxford in 1974. Her reading of her poem "The Battery Hen" was re-broadcast as Pick of the Week on the Today programme on BBC Radio 4, leading to a six-month contract with Radio Oxford. Her recital went on to feature as an item in the BBC's Pick of the Year. In February 1976, she left Smiths to pursue poetry full-time.

In September 2006, the BBC's Magazine Monitor's 10 Things..., claimed, though without providing details, to have learnt that week (1-8 Sep) that Bob Dylan inspired Ayres to write poetry. However, although Ayres has often spoken of her admiration of Dylan, in a 2015 interview, she stated that "I don't know that he [Dylan] ever was the inspiration to start writing poetry... I certainly loved him." In a 2006 interview (aired on Radio New Zealand's Nine To Noon programme, 24 October 2006), she stated that, at the age of 12, she enjoyed writing parodies of the Lonnie Donegan songs popular at that time.

== Career ==
In 1975, Ayres appeared on the television talent show Opportunity Knocks. This led to a wide variety of guest appearances on television and radio shows. Since then, she has published six books of poems, toured in a one-woman stage show, hosted her own TV show and performed her stage show for the Queen.

Her poetry has a simple style and deals with everyday subject matter. Her poem "Oh, I Wish I'd Looked After Me Teeth" was voted into the Top 10 of a BBC poll to find the nation's 100 Favourite Comic Poems. In the UK Arts Council's report on poetry, Ayres was identified as the fifth best-selling poet in Britain in 1998 and 1999.

Ayres was the guest on BBC Radio 4's Desert Island Discs in 1979 and 2018. On the first occasion, she chose "The New St George" by John and Chris Leslie, The Day of the Jackal by Frederick Forsyth, and a large basket of sugared almonds as her favourite song, book and luxury item respectively; on her second appearance she chose The Fureys' "When You Were Sweet Sixteen", The Oxford Book of Humorous Prose: From William Caxton to P. G. Wodehouse by Frank Muir, and a medicine cabinet including mosquito repellent.

From 1996, Ayres has appeared frequently on BBC Radio: from 1996 until 1999, she presented a two-hour music and chat show every Sunday afternoon on BBC Radio 2; this was followed by two series of Pam Ayres' Open Road, in which she visited various parts of the United Kingdom, interviewing people with interesting stories to tell about their lives and local areas. More recently, Ayres has become a regular contributor to BBC Radio 4, appearing in programmes such as Just a Minute, Say the Word, That Reminds Me, and six series of her own show, Ayres on the Air, a radio show of her poetry and sketches.

In 2007, Ayres acted in a radio sitcom, Potting On for Radio 4, co-starring Geoffrey Whitehead. She wrote and recorded six series of her Radio 4 programme Ayres on the Air, the latest of which was broadcast in 2018.

Since 2002, Ayres has appeared a number of times on Channel 4 in Countdown's Dictionary Corner alongside Susie Dent.

In 2009, she made her first appearance on the BBC TV programme, QI. In 2011, she said in a Daily Telegraph magazine interview that she was "about to go on my 14th tour of Australia".

Her autobiography, The Necessary Aptitude: A Memoir, was published in 2011. It traces her life and career from growing as the youngest of six children in a council house in the Vale of the White Horse, Berkshire, her time in the Women's Royal Air Force and the string of events that led to Opportunity Knocks. The title refers to the number of times she was told in her life she "did not have the necessary aptitude".

In 2013, she published her latest book of poems, entitled You Made me Late Again!

In September 2021, her TV series The Cotswolds with Pam Ayres premiered on Channel 5. Each episode features a special guest and ends with Pam reciting a short, uplifting verse summing up her adventures. In 2022, the programme was recommissioned as The Cotswolds and Beyond with Pam Ayres, as the programme expanded its remit to have Ayres visit the market town of Pershore to meet Toyah Willcox, as well as going to the Henley Regatta with Steve Redgrave, the Dean Forest Railway and the gardens at Highgrove, where she met the then Prince of Wales.

In February 2022, Pam Ayres starred as a guest on Lee Mack's team in BBC's comedy panel show Would I Lie To You?.

On December 21 2025, Pam Ayres was Michael Berkeley's guest on BBC Radio 3's Private Passions.

She regularly performs her poetry at the Glastonbury Festival, most recently in 2024.

=== Influence ===
The poet John Cooper Clarke has cited Ayres's early success on Opportunity Knocks as being highly influential on his career.

== Personal life ==
Ayres is married to theatre producer Dudley Russell, and they have two sons. They live in Cirencester, Gloucestershire, and keep rare breeds of cattle, as well as sheep, pigs, chickens, and guinea fowl. Ayres is a keen gardener and beekeeper. She is a patron of the British Hen Welfare Trust, Cheltenham Animal Shelter and Oak and Furrows Wildlife Rescue Centre.

In the 2004 Birthday Honours, Ayres was appointed a Member of the Order of the British Empire (MBE) for services to literature and entertainment.

== Select bibliography and discography ==
- 1976: Some of Me Poems. London: Galaxy Records, ISBN 0-9504774-0-0
- 1976: Some More of Me Poems and Songs. London: Galaxy Records, ISBN 0-9504774-1-9
- 1978: Thoughts of a Late-Night Knitter. London: Arrow Books, ISBN 0-09-134380-1
- 1978: All Pam's Poems; illustrated by Roy Garnham Elmore. London: Hutchinson, ISBN 0-09-134380-1 (including the contents of her first three books)
- 1985: Dear Mum: Poems for Mums and their Babies. London: Severn House Publishers, ISBN 0-7278-2066-4
- 1992: Pam Ayres: the Works. London: BBC Books, September 1992, ISBN 0-563-36751-2
- 1998: With These Hands: a collection. London: Orion, February 1998, ISBN 0-7528-1553-9
- 2006: Surgically Enhanced. London: Hodder & Stoughton, September 2006, ISBN 0-340-92278-8
- 2013: You Made me Late Again!. London: Ebury Press, September 2013, ISBN 9780091940461
- 2019: Up in the Attic. London: Ebury Publishing, October 2019, ISBN 9781785177125
- 2022: Who Are You Calling Vermin?. London: Ebury Spotlight, September 2022, ISBN 1529149991
- 2024: Doggedly Onward: A life in poems. Ebury Publishing, October 2024.

Audio CDs

- 2005: Ayres on the Air. BBC Audio, highlights from BBC Radio 4 series, ISBN 0-563-52435-9
- 2006: Pam Ayres: Ancient and Modern. London: Hodder & Stoughton, November 2006, ISBN 1-84456-318-9

DVDs

- 2006: Pam Ayres: In Her Own Words (Acorn Media, March 2006); recorded live at The Everyman Theatre, Cheltenham in September 2005
- 2011: Pam Ayres, Word Perfect: Live from the Theatre Royal Windsor (Acorn Media, September 2011)

Autobiography

- 2011: The Necessary Aptitude: A Memoir. Ebury Press, September 2011, ISBN 0-09-194048-6
