= Virginia Woolf's Night and Day =

2026 romantic drama film

- Theatrical release poster
- Directed by: Tina Gharavi
- Screenplay by: Justine Waddell
- Based on: Night and Day by Virginia Woolf
- Produced by: Stephen Julius; Christopher Figg; Justine Waddell; Meg Thomson; Julie Link; Philipp Steffens
- Starring: Haley Bennett; Timothy Spall; Elyas M'Barek; Lily Allen; Jack Whitehall; Jennifer Saunders; Sally Phillips; John Edward Miller IV
- Cinematography: Sebastian Edschmid
- Edited by: Hansjörg Weißbrich; Ben Wilson
- Music by: Simon Goff
- Production companies: Stellican; Asterisk Films; Piccadilly Pictures; Kioski; GLISK; FilmHedge; M.Y.R.A. Entertainment
- Distributed by: Vue Lumiere (United Kingdom); Wild Bunch (Germany); Quiver Distribution (United States)
- Release dates: 1 June 2026 (SXSW London); 19 June 2026 (United Kingdom); 9 July 2026 (Germany); 4 September 2026 (United States)
- Running time: 95 minutes
- Countries: United Kingdom; Germany; United States
- Language: English

Virginia Woolf's Night and Day is a 2026 period drama film directed by Tina Gharavi and starring Haley Bennett, Timothy Spall, Jennifer Saunders, Jack Whitehall, Sally Phillips, Lily Allen, and Elyas M'Barek. It was written by Justine Waddell, adapted from the 1919 Virginia Woolf novel of the same name.

== Synopsis ==
In Britain at the turn of the 20th century, a female astronomer tries to avoid the patriarchal attitudes of the day.

Set in London in 1910 brilliant and headstrong Katharine Hilbery resists her parents' plans for marriage, determined instead to pursue her passion for astronomy. When her controlling father, Mr. Hilbery, forces her into an engagement with family friend William, Katharine's carefully guarded independence is threatened.

Her world begins to expand when she befriends spirited suffragette Mary Datchet and crosses paths with working-class editor Ralph Denham, who is assisting her mother, Mrs. Hilbery, with a family biography. As romantic loyalties shift, Katharine is pushed to question everything she has been taught about love, ambition, and how to claim her space in the world.

== Cast ==
- Haley Bennett as Katherine Hilbery
- Lily Allen as Mary Datchet
- Timothy Spall as Terence Hilbery
- Elyas M'Barek as Ralph Denham
- Jack Whitehall as William Rodney
- Jennifer Saunders as Bess Hilbery
- Sally Phillips as Joan Denham
- Misia Butler as Cyril Otway
- Alex Macqueen as Sir Alexander Holmes
- Simon Phillips as Sir Francis Otway
- Frances Barber as Lady Margaret Huggins

== Production ==
It was produced by Asterisk Films, Piccadilly Pictures, Stellican, Kioski, and GLISK, and the producers include Justine Waddell, Stephen Julius, Christopher Figg, Meg Thomson, Julie Link and Philipp Steffens.

Principal photography began in Newcastle upon Tyne in late 2024, and was completed in February 2025. Filming locations included the Literary and Philosophical Society of Newcastle upon Tyne, Common Room of the Great North, Ryhope Engines Museum, Tanfield Railway and Beamish Museum. Additional filming took place in Cologne, Germany.

== Release ==
Virginia Woolf's Night and Day premiered at the South by Southwest London on 1 June 2026. It was released in the United Kingdom on 19 June 2026, and was released in Germany on 9 July 2026. In May 2026, Quiver Distribution acquired the U.S. distribution rights, for a September 4, 2026 release.

== Reception ==
Peter Bradshaw in The Guardian gave the film 4/5 stars, writing: "The film removes Woolf’s supercilious condescension towards the self-betterment of newly educated lower and middle classes, and instead focuses on a sweet-natured story, performed with conviction by its all-star ensemble cast, interspersed with dreamlike set pieces."

In Variety, Guy Lodge wrote: "As much as Gharavi tries to energize proceedings with a bobbing handheld camera and an electro-tinged score that, in the closing credits, finally bubbles over into ethereal, Ellie Goulding-style pop, Virginia Woolf’s Night & Day can feel talky and stiffly didactic, however sincere in its convictions."

Kevin Maher in The Times gave the film 4/5 stars, writing: "Bennett is exceptional, part open wound, part furious intensity, and Whitehall gives us his best blue-blooded buffoon yet. The ending is perfectly bittersweet."
