= John Grillo =

British actor

- Born: John Martin Grillo; 29 November 1942 (age 83); Watford, Hertfordshire, England
- Occupation: Actor
- Years active: 1972–present

John Martin Grillo (born 29 November 1942, in Watford, Hertfordshire) is an English actor.

== Biography ==
Grillo was educated at Watford Grammar School for Boys and Trinity Hall, Cambridge, and while there was actively involved in student theatre. He performed with Footlights in their annual revue. After Cambridge, he was awarded an Arts Council Playwrighting Bursary and his plays were performed at Nottingham, Glasgow, Oxford and Dublin as well as at the ADC Theatre in Cambridge.

He played Mr. Samgrass in the ITV series Brideshead Revisited, and Phillip Marriott QC in Crown Court. He had minor parts in other shows, including Blackadder II, Bergerac, Capital City, EastEnders, Blott on the Landscape, Maisie Raine, Mike and Angelo, Bramwell, The Bill, Prince Regent, Cracker, The Darling Buds of May, Foyle's War, The Grand, Taggart, The Broker's Man, Oliver Twist, Mother Love and Rumpole of the Bailey. Grillo performed Oswald in the BBC Television Shakespeare production of King Lear in 1982. He also had a more regular role in Three Up, Two Down, playing the gloomy and pessimistic zoo-keeper Wilf Perkins.

In 1997 he appeared as Mr Carkdale, the English teacher who spoke only in Anglo-Saxon, in two series of Steven Moffat's school-sitcom Chalk. In 2008, he contributed to the audio commentary for the DVD release.

His film credits include appearances in Scum, A Murder of Quality, Firefox, Brazil, Blame It on the Bellboy, Danny the Champion of the World, Christopher Columbus: The Discovery, Orlando, Jack and Sarah, FairyTale: A True Story, Jinnah, The Affair of the Necklace, and Max.

== Filmography ==
=== Film ===
Year	Film	Role	Notes
1972	Dyn Amo	2nd Girl's Partner	
1979	Dirty Money	Bank Official	
1979	Scum	Goodyear	
1982	Firefox	Customs Officer	
1985	Brazil	Interview Official	
1985	The 17th Bride	Jonah	
1992	Blame It On the Bellboy	Hotel Manager	
1992	Christopher Columbus: The Discovery	Chios Mapmaker	
1992	Orlando	First Official	
1995	Jack & Sarah	Landlord	
1997	FairyTale: A True Story	Mr. West	
1998	Jinnah	Sir Dinshaw Petit	
2001	The Affair of the Necklace	Dr. Legear	
2002	Max	Nina's Father	
2018	Dark Secrets	Frank	Short film

=== Television ===
Year	Film	Role	Notes
1973	Once Upon a Time	Mirabeau	Episode: "Buttons"
1973	Sporting Scenes	Ballistics Professor	Episode: "England, Their England"
1973	The Cricket Match	Ballistics Professor	Television film
1974	Intimate Strangers	Frank Vidler	Episode: "Episode #1.1"
1976	The Lady of the Camellias	Joseph	2 episodes
1976	Enemy	The Policeman	Television film
1977	A Christmas Carol	Caroline's Husband	Television film
1978	Scorpion Tales	Ministry Official	Episode: "Truth or Consequence"
1979	Dick Turpin	Nightingale	2 episodes
1979	ITV Playhouse	Booking Clerk	Episode: "No Mama No"
1979	Prince Regent	Pietro Cuchi	Episode: "Defeat and Victory"
1979	Collision Course	Dacjic	Television film
1980	Cribb	Goldstein	Episode: "Swing, Swing Together"
1980	A Question of Guilt	Mr. Norton	6 episodes
1980–1984	Play for Today	The Vet/Smith	2 episodes
1981	The Good Soldier	Herr Schontz	Television film
1981	Lady Killers	Mr. Manners	Episode: "The Darlingest Boy"
1981	Brideshead Revisited	Mr. Samgrass	3 episodes
1981	Rules of Justice	Mr. Shine	Television film
1981	The Borgias	Don Diego Ibanez	Episode: "Part 10"
1982	King Lear	Oswald	Television film
1982	Shine On Harvey Moon	Boatman	Episode: "The Course of True Love"
1982	Crown Court	Dr. Bernard Massey/Philip Marriott QC	5 episodes
1983	Gaskin	Solicitor	Television film
1983	The Campaign	USDAW-sponsored MP	Television film
1983	Shades of Darkness	Harold Parvis	Episode: "Afterward"
1983	Heather Ann	Ferguson	Television film
1983	Chessgame	Jake Shapiro	Episode: "Flying Blind"
1984	Amy	Bell	Television film
1984	Chocky	Sir William Thorbe	Episode: "Episode #1.5"
1984	Strangers and Brothers	Arthur Brown	3 episodes
1984	Murder Not Proven?	The Rev. Goodman	Episode: "Death on the Mountain"
1984	Brass	Seymour Pugh	Episode: "Episode #2.5"
1984	Weekend Playhouse	Neighbour	Episode: "Not That Kind of People"
1984	Freud	Delboeuf	Episode: "The Hypnotist"
1984	The Gentle Touch	Mr Armour	Episode: "Cure"
1985	The Price	Jacobs	Episode: "Episode #1.3"
1985	Blott on the Landscape	Prime	Episode: "A Phone Call"
1985	The Holy Experiment	Father Lieberman SJ	Television film
1985–1986	Mog	Sir Peter Wakefield	4 episodes
1985–1987	Drummonds	Dr. Sigmund 'Siggy' Gunz	17 episodes
1985–1989	Three Up, Two Down	Wilf Perkins	16 episodes
1986	Blackadder II	Dr. Leech	Episode: "Bells"
1986	EastEnders	Mr. Makepeace	Episode: "Episode #1.128"
1986	A Very Peculiar Practice	Dr. Tittle	Episode: "Catastrophy Theory"
1986	Big Deal	Ben	Episode: "Following in Father's Footsteps"
1986	Call Me Mister	Laszlo	Episode: "The Carve Up"
1986	Paradise Postponed	Lawyer	Episode: "The Simcox Inheritance"
1986	The Alamut Ambush	Jake Shapiro	Television film
1986	Cold War Killers	Jake Shapiro	Television film
1987	A Little Princess	Barrow	2 episodes
1987	Don't Wait Up	Mr. Bindman	Episode: "Episode #4.5"
1987	Queenie	Johan Krauss	Episode: "Episode #1.2"
1987	A Perfect Spy	Cunningham	Episode: "Episode #1.2"
1987	The Bretts	Theo Vanderpump	Episode: "Forbidden Fruit: Part Two"
1987	Bergerac	Cyril Clavering	Episode: "Treasure Hunt"
1988	The Modern World: Ten Great Writers	Naphta	Episode: "Thomas Mann's 'The Magic Mountain'"
1988	Out of the Shadows	Markos Togas	Television film
1988	Taggart	Tibor Meray	2 episodes
1988	The Most Dangerous Man in the World	Gebze	Television film
1988	Rumpole of the Bailey	Judge Teasdale	Episode: "Rumpole and the Bubble Reputation"
1989	Danny the Champion of the World	Mr. Parker	Television film
1989	The Man Who Lived at the Ritz	von Behr	Television film
1989	Mother Love	Art Critic	Episode: "Episode #1.2"
1989	4 Play	Cantor	Episode: "Shalom Joan Collins"
1990	Max and Helen	Joseph Weiss	Television film
1990	Capital City	Ramowski	Episode: "Ethical Investments"
1990	This Is David Harper	Graham Grindle	Episode: "An Explosive Situation"
1990	Screenplay	Hans	Episode: "August Saturday"
1991	Fiddlers Three	N.J. Simpson	Episode: "The Whiz Kid"
1991	The Darling Buds of May	Mr. Jerebohm	2 episodes
1991	Roy's Raiders	Theatre Director	Episode: "Episode #1.3"
1991	Titmuss Regained	Barty Pine	Episode: "And the Next Day..."
1991	A Murder of Quality	The Pathologist	Television film
1991	Watt on Earth	Jemadah	4 episodes
1991	Boon	Edwin Brett	Episode: "Stamp Duty"
1991–1992	The Bill	Ventham/Marsen	2 episodes
1992	A Bit of Fry and Laurie	Tailor	Episode: "Episode #3.3"
1992	Moon and Son	Bertrand	Episode: "A Foreign Body"
1992	Spatz	Stubbs	Episode: "Driving Miss Wesley"
1992	B&B	Mr. Berry	Television film
1992	Between the Lines	Solicitor	Episode: "Lest Ye Be Judged"
1993	Mr Don & Mr George	Major	Episode: "You Can Run...But You Can't Hide Your Legs"
1993	Crimewatch File	Michael Sams	Episode: "A Murderer's Game"
1993	Lovejoy	'Snip' Saunders	Episode: "The Kakiemon Tiger"
1993	Bookmark	Dr. Bronowski	Episode: "Selected Exits"
1993	Cracker	Simon Appleby	2 episodes
1993–1998	Mike & Angelo	Albert Squeers/Herr Klugman	2 episodes
1994	Under the Hammer	Oscar William Leonard "Owly" Johnstone	2 episodes
1994	Time After Time	Gilpin	Episode: "Breaking Out"
1995	Johnny and the Dead	Antonio Vicenti	4 episodes
1996	Bramwell	Mr. Johnson	Episode: "Episode #2.8"
1997	Chalk	Mr. Carkdale	12 episodes
1998	The Grand	Mr. Bunner	Episode: "Episode #2.5"
1998	The Broker's Man	Solomon	Episode: "Kith and Kin"
1998	Maisie Raine	Franco Lucantoni	Episode: "An Ordinary Little Tragedy"
1999	Oliver Twist	Mr. Grimwig	3 episodes
2000	Trust	Dr. Ian Matthews	Television film
2001	Beech Is Back	Dr. Morgan Philips	Episode: "Episode #1.2"
2002	Shackleton	Franks	2 episodes
2004	Foyle's War	Watchmaker	Episode: "The French Drop"
