= The Genuine Particle =

The Genuine Particle was a one-off comedy special, broadcast on BBC Radio 4 on 10 September 2008, to commemorate the switching of the Large Hadron Collider at CERN. It was written by Steve Punt and produced by David Tyler, and starred Reece Shearsmith, Geoffrey Whitehead, Nicola Walker, Adrian Scarborough, Ingrid Oliver, and Ben Willbond.

The show was set hundreds of meters underground on the day of the opening of the Large Hadron Collider, and centred around time travel, wormholes, and a lost security pass. It was published by Penguin Random House as an audio play, and is also available on Audible.
