= Only You Can Save Mankind =

1992 novel by Terry Pratchett

- First edition
- Author: Terry Pratchett
- Original title: Only You Can Save Mankind
- Cover artist: David Scutt
- Language: English
- Series: Johnny Maxwell Trilogy
- Genre: Children's literature, Science fiction
- Publisher: Doubleday (London)
- Publication date: 1992
- Publication place: United Kingdom
- Media type: book
- Pages: 173
- ISBN: 0-385-40308-9
- OCLC: 28065341
- Followed by: Johnny and the Dead

Only You Can Save Mankind (1992) is the first novel in the Johnny Maxwell trilogy of children's books and fifth young adult novel by Terry Pratchett, author of the Discworld sequence of books. The following novels in the Johnny Maxwell Trilogy are Johnny and the Dead (1993) and Johnny and the Bomb (1996). The setting of the novels in the modern world was a departure for Pratchett, who wrote more regularly in fantasy world settings.

== Plot summary ==
Twelve-year-old Johnny receives a pirate edition of the new video game Only You Can Save Mankind from his friend Wobbler. After playing it for a short time he startled when the ScreeWee Empire surrenders to him. After accepting the surrender he finds himself inside the game in his dreams, where he must deal with the suspicious Gunnery Officer as well as the understanding Captain, and work out exactly what they're all supposed to do now. This might all be the result of an over-active imagination except that the ScreeWee have disappeared altogether from everyone else's copy of the game. With the help of another player, Kirsty, who calls herself "Sigourney" (as in Weaver), Johnny must try to get the ScreeWee home.

== Ideas and themes ==
It plays with the effects of perception. For instance, since Kirsty refuses to see the ScreeWee as anything other than alien monsters who exist to be shot, they are much less human-like in her presence than when only dealing with Johnny.

Wobbler writes a computer game entitled Journey to Alpha Centauri. The game is meant to be played in real-time, meaning it would take three thousand years to finish the journey. If the game were actually played for three thousand years, the player would be rewarded with a message saying "Welcome to Alpha Centauri. Now go home". This inspired an interactive fiction game developed by Julian Fleetwood, Journey to Alpha Centauri (In Real Time). It was released in 1998, with the same premise of requiring three thousand years of game play to complete.

== Adaptations ==
In 1996, Only You Can Save Mankind was adapted into a three-part radio drama on BBC Radio 4, starring Tim Smith as Johnny.

In 2004, a musical adaptation for the stage was premiered at the Edinburgh Festival Fringe, with music by Leighton James House and lyrics by Shaun McKenna. A UK national tour is planned for opening in late 2011 with director Nikolai Foster. The album was released online November 23, 2009. A national CD release came out in April 2010.
