= Chaos (2005 action film) =

Film by Tony Giglio

- Promotional release poster
- Directed by: Tony Giglio
- Written by: Tony Giglio
- Produced by: Michael Derbas; Gavin Wilding; Huw Penallt Jones
- Starring: Jason Statham; Ryan Phillippe; Wesley Snipes
- Cinematography: Richard Greatrex
- Edited by: Sean Barton
- Music by: Trevor Jones
- Production companies: Möbius International; Current Entertainment; Rampage Entertainment; Chaotic Productions; Pierce/Williams Entertainment
- Distributed by: Capitol Films; Lionsgate
- Release date: December 15, 2005 (UAE)
- Running time: 106 minutes
- Countries: Canada; United Kingdom; United States
- Language: English
- Budget: C$30 million (US$16.2 million)
- Box office: US$7 million

Chaos is a 2005 crime action thriller film written and directed by Tony Giglio, and starring Jason Statham, Ryan Phillippe and Wesley Snipes. It premiered in the United Arab Emirates on December 15, 2005, but its first North American release was not until February 19, 2008, on DVD.

== Plot ==
Seattle PD Detective Quentin Conners and his partner Jason York are implicated in the death of a hostage taken by carjacker John Curtis. After a fellow police officer, Callo, testifies against them, Conners is suspended, and York is fired. In reality, York tried to shoot Curtis during a standoff on the bridge, but accidentally killed the hostage. Curtis fired back, and Conners killed him in self-defense.

Some time later, Lorenz and four other criminals take hostages in a bank. Lorenz demands to negotiate with Conners, who is reinstated under the surveillance of a new partner, fresh-faced cop Shane Dekker. The criminals flee following an explosion. Dekker tells Connors that during negotiations, Lorenz made cryptic references to chaos theory.

The detectives catch one of the bank robbers, who is arrested and hospitalized from his injuries. At his girlfriend's home, banknotes are found with a scent used to mark evidence collected by police. The banknote serial numbers did not come from that day's robbery, but instead from police storage having been signed out two weeks earlier by Callo. Callo is found shot dead in his home, with incriminating evidence linking him to the heist.

When reviewing video footage from the bank robbery, Dekker notices that the bank regional manager's computer is deliberately shielded from view. Fingerprints on the keyboard reveal the identity of a hacker that Conners had arrested, but whose conviction was overturned after the shooting on the bridge. The hacker had placed a virus in the bank system that would transfer one billion dollars to the robbers' accounts through thousands of small transactions around the world. Conners and Dekker go to question the hacker, but he is shot dead by Lorenz.

Dekker questions the hospitalized bank robber, who reveals that Lorenz is Scott Curtis, the brother of John Curtis. Conners leads a stakeout at Scott's house, where they suspect Scott will kill the remaining bank robbers in his crew. A shootout results in the suspects' deaths, and a bomb blows up the house while Conners is inside. Dekker realizes that Callo's signature from the evidence storage was forged by the evidence custody officer, who reveals that "Scott Curtis" is actually Connors' partner, York. Tracking York's mobile phone, Dekker surprises York at a diner and pursues him. After a struggle, Dekker kills York in self-defense.

When Dekker pays for his coffee at the diner, he discovers the ten-dollar banknote that he'd taken from Conners earlier after a meal together, is scented, revealing that Conners was involved in the entire scheme along with York. Dekker finds a copy of James Gleick's Chaos: Making a New Science in Conners' house, showing he had faked his ignorance of the mathematics. On a hunch, Dekker looks for airline tickets booked in Gleick's name and runs to the airport.

Conners calls Dekker as Dekker frantically searches for him in the busy airport. Flashbacks reveal how the seemingly unconnected events in the film formed a pattern. Conners had placed his badge on the corpse of one of York's henchmen before the explosion. Conners and York had recruited a group of ex-convicts to pull off the heist, angry for being abandoned after giving so much of their lives in service, but York had gone off the deep end rather than listening to Connors. Callo was framed for being a dirty cop. Conners tells Dekker he only killed those who deserved it, ends the call, and escapes on a private jet.

== Cast ==
- Jason Statham as Detective Quentin Conners
- Ryan Phillippe as Detective Shane Dekker
- Wesley Snipes as Lorenz / Jason York
- Henry Czerny as Captain Martin Jenkins
- Justine Waddell as Detective Teddy Calloway
- Nicholas Lea as Detective Vincent Durano
- Keegan Connor Tracy as Marnie Rollins
- Jessica Steen as Karen Cross
- John Cassini as Bernie Callo
- Damon (Scott) Johnson as Brandon Dax
- Paul Perri as Harry Hume
- Natassia Malthe as Gina Lopez
- Ty Olsson as Damon Richards
- Terry Chen as Chris Lei
- Mike Dopud as Lamar Galt
- Rob LaBelle as Bank Manager
- Garvin Cross as SWAT Commander
- Michasha Armstrong as Xander Harrington
- Kim Howey as Lisa Reane
- Gaston Howard as John Curtis
- Tiara Sorensen as private jet stewardess

== Production ==
The film was a co-production between the United Kingdom, Canada, and the United States. Principal photography took place in Seattle, Washington and Vancouver, British Columbia, in locations including Simon Fraser University and the Burrard Street Bridge.

The film was originally set to be produced by Franchise Pictures with distribution by Warner Bros., which began to suffer serious financial problems early into production due to the failures of its previous film Battlefield Earth, and allegations of fraud concerning artificial inflation of the film's budget to increase investment from German production company Intertainment AG. This led Franchise's then-parent company Mobius International to take over production. Due to last-minute budgetary constraints imposed by the new producers, the film's script was heavily rewritten to accommodate a reduced shooting schedule (40 days to 22 days). Lead actor Jason Statham had signed a two-picture deal with Franchise, a deal which included both Chaos and a heist film titled Baker Street. The latter was placed on hold after Franchise filed for Chapter 11 Bankruptcy, where it was eventually produced by Relativity Media and released in 2008 under the title The Bank Job.

== Release ==
Screen Gems at one point was attached as the film's theatrical distributor, but a financial deal could not be made regarding release prints and advertising between the studio and producers. Eventually Lionsgate picked up the film and went through the same drama with producers, leading to a three-year delay in the film's North American release.

== Reception ==
=== Critical response ===
Michael S. Gant of Metro Silicon Valley opined, "The plot depends on an impossible chain of coincidences, but there are some decent car chases." Ian Jane of DVD Talk rated it 2.5/5 stars and wrote, "Chaos has a nice twist towards the end but is otherwise riddled with bad action movie clichés and poorly written dialogue." Jeffrey Kauffman, also of DVD Talk, rated it 3/5 stars and wrote, "Chaos isn't a bad film; it just isn't a very good one either." Tom Becker of DVD Verdict wrote, "Chaos isn't a great movie, but it's entertaining and manages to keep you off-kilter for much of its running time. While the film is ultimately too clever for its own good, Giglio gets points for trying to smart-up the genre." Also writing for DVD Verdict, David Johnson said, "Chaos may not redefine what's possible in the police suspense thriller, but it's satisfying and entertaining enough to earn a look-see by fans of the genre or anyone hankering for a decent, plot-twist-heavy actioner."
