= The One and Only (2002 film) =

2002 British romantic comedy directed by Simon Cellan Jones

- Directed by: Simon Cellan Jones
- Written by: Peter Flannery
- Based on: The One and Only by Kim Fupz Aakeson and Susanne Bier
- Produced by: Leslee Udwin
- Starring: Justine Waddell; Richard Roxburgh; Jonathan Cake; Sharon Scurfield
- Cinematography: Remi Adefarasin
- Edited by: Pia Di Ciaula
- Music by: Gabriel Yared
- Release date: 2002
- Running time: 91 minutes
- Country: United Kingdom
- Language: English

The One and Only is a 2002 British romantic comedy film directed by Simon Cellan Jones, and starring Richard Roxburgh, Justine Waddell and Sharon Scurfield. The film is a remake of Susanne Bier's 1999 Danish box-office hit Den Eneste Ene. Supported by the Newcastle City Council to promote a positive image of the city, the story was reset in Newcastle and Gateshead.

== Plot ==
Two couples childless visit their doctor to discuss the matter. Stevie is married to Sonny, an Italian footballer who plays for Newcastle United, but who has succumbed to frequent injury. He is desperate for a child, and it soon emerges that Stevie has not really been trying. She is reluctant to become pregnant as she does not want to get fat. Jenny and Neil are trying to adopt, as Neil is infertile. Being childless has turned Jenny into something of a monster, and Neil now views her with dislike. He wants to break with her but is too kind-hearted. He goes ahead with the plan to adopt to keep her happy. When Stevie meets Neil on the day he comes to deliver her brand new kitchen, it is already too late for love at first sight. Too late for both of them. Stevie is already five minutes pregnant by her Italian footballer husband. And too late for Neil, too - his wife Jenny has already applied to adopt an African girl. But too late or otherwise, love at first sight is exactly what happens. How can Neil and Stevie get out of their mistaken marriages and into each other's arms?

== Cast ==
- Justine Waddell as Stevie
- Richard Roxburgh as Neil
- Jonathan Cake as Andrea "Sonny" Bufflini
- Patsy Kensit as Stella
- Michael Hodgson as Stan
- Aisling O'Sullivan as Jenny
- Kerry Rolfe as Sharon
- Joan Murphy as Theatre Sister
- Donna Air as Donna
- Angel Thomas as Mgala
- Charlie Hardwick as Doctor
- Tracey Gillman as Social Worker
- Tom Goodman-Hill as Kitchen Salesman
- Trevor Fox as Trevor
- Joe Caffrey as Joe
- Judi Earl as Manageress

== Reception ==
Neil Smith of the BBC gave it 1 out of 5 and wrote: "A love letter to Newcastle that, if nothing else, will be remembered for some of the worst accents ever heard in a British picture." Empire gave it 2 out of 5.
