= Johnny and the Dead =

Book by Terry Pratchett

- First edition
- Author: Terry Pratchett
- Cover artist: John Avon
- Language: English
- Series: Johnny Maxwell Trilogy
- Genre: Children's literature, fantasy
- Publisher: Doubleday (London)
- Publication date: 1993
- Publication place: United Kingdom
- Media type: Book
- ISBN: 0-385-40301-1
- OCLC: 28889741
- Preceded by: Only You Can Save Mankind (1992)
- Followed by: Johnny and the Bomb (1996)

Johnny and the Dead is a 1993 fantasy children's novel by English author Terry Pratchett, the second of Pratchett's novels to feature the character Johnny Maxwell. The other novels in the Johnny Maxwell Trilogy are Only You Can Save Mankind (1992) and Johnny and the Bomb (1996). In this story, Johnny sees and speaks with the spirits (they object to the term "ghost") of those interred in his local cemetery and tries to help them when their home is threatened.

The novel was republished by HarperCollins in 2006.

Johnny and the Dead is a feature of some schools' English curriculum.

== Plot summary ==
The story starts with Johnny Maxwell, a 12-year-old boy, taking a shortcut through the local Blackbury cemetery to reach his home. In the cemetery, Johnny meets the spirit of Alderman Thomas Bowler and realizes that he can interact with the spirits of the dead. Later, Johnny meets all the deceased occupants of the cemetery and discusses with them the council's sale of Blackbury's neglected cemetery to a faceless conglomerate, who plan to build offices on it. Various dead citizens, led by a former town councillor, ask Johnny to help stop it.

While Johnny (helped by his semi-believing friends) tries to find evidence of famous internees and speaks out at community meetings, the dead begin to take an interest in modern-day life and realise they are not, as they once believed, trapped in the cemetery.

Finally the council is forced to back down, but the dead are no longer interested; they have decided that instead of waiting for the Day of Judgement, they will make the decision themselves. Most of them depart the cemetery to continue their journey into the afterlife but, thanks to the campaigning of the Blackbury Volunteers, the town's living residents have rediscovered the cemetery as a link to their past. As one of the dead puts it before leaving: "The living must remember, and the dead must forget."

== Ideas and themes ==
Johnny and the Dead may be loosely based on real events in Westminster in the 1980s, when the council sold three cemeteries as building land for 15p (Pratchett was working as a journalist at this time).

Part of the story deals with the last surviving member of the Blackbury pals, a Pals battalion with obvious parallel to the Accrington Pals. This man is called Tommy Atkins, the name given to the generic British soldier of the day.

A running joke in the book is that most of the Dead are "nearly famous", often being recognisable as very similar to a famous person. It is possible that Pratchett intends Blackbury Cemetery to be "nearly Highgate", especially as one of the most prominent ghosts (William Stickers) is described as "The man who would have invented communism if Karl Marx hadn't." William Stickers may also have partially been inspired by one of Pratchett's former college George Topley at the Bucks Free Press who had also apparently described himself as taking the wrong ship to fight in the Spanish civil war and ending up on England's east coast.

== Reception ==
Johnny and the Dead is a Junior Library Guild book.

According to Kirkus Reviews, the story's narrative can be "a bit preachy at times", though they argued that "kids will nevertheless find themselves won over by both the dead and Johnny’s basic sense of decency". They highlighted how "humor and honest pathos play off each other to make for an emotionally balanced whole". The Guardian agreed with their sentiments on humor.

== Adaptations ==
The book was made into a TV serial of the same name for CITV on ITV in 1995. It starred Andrew Falvey as Johnny, and featured Brian Blessed as William Stickers and George Baker as Alderman Bowler.

It was also adapted as a play by Stephen Briggs.

== Translations ==
- Johnny et les morts (French)
- Nur Du kannst sie verstehen (i.e. "Only You Can Understand Them", German)
- Johnny och döden (Swedish)
- Джонни и мертвецы (Russian)
- Johnny ve Ölüler (Turkish)
- Joni a'r Meirwon (Welsh)
- Johnny i zmarli (Polish)
- Johnny a mŕtvi (Slovak)
- Johnny y los muertos (Spanish)
- Wij pikken het niet langer! (i.e. "We will not take this any longer ", Dutch)
