= Night and Day (Woolf novel) =

1919 novel by Virginia Woolf

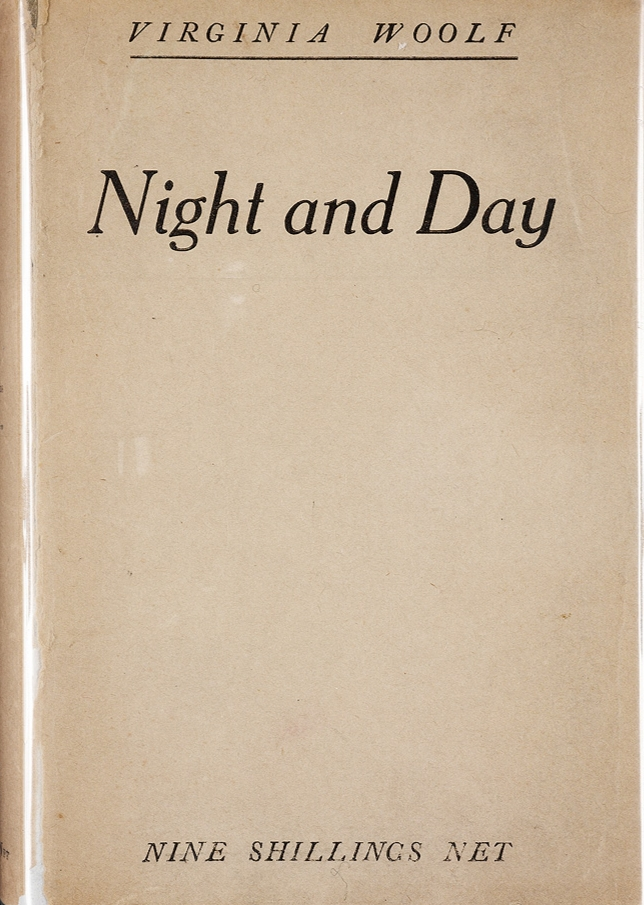
- First edition
- Author: Virginia Woolf
- Language: English
- Publisher: Duckworth
- Publication date: 24 October 1919
- Publication place: United Kingdom
- Media type: Print
- Pages: 442
- Text: Night and Day at Wikisource

Night and Day is a novel by Virginia Woolf first published on 24 October 1919. Set in Edwardian London, Night and Day contrasts the daily lives and romantic attachments of two acquaintances, Katharine Hilbery and Mary Datchet. The novel examines the relationships between love, marriage, happiness, and success.

The novel has four major characters: Katharine Hilbery, Mary Datchet, Ralph Denham, and William Rodney. Night and Day deals with questions concerning women's suffrage, and asks whether love and marriage can co-exist and whether marriage is necessary for happiness. Motifs throughout the book include the stars and sky, the River Thames, and walks. Woolf makes many references to the works of William Shakespeare, especially As You Like It.

== Composition ==
Woolf began writing the novel in 1916. Its earliest surviving title was Dreams and Realities. Woolf wrote most of the novel in very difficult circumstances, as she was recovering from a nervous breakdown and only permitted to write for a limited amount of time each day. No complete manuscript for the novel survives.

Woolf records writing the final sentence of the novel in her diary on 21 November 1918.

== Characters ==
=== Katharine Hilbery ===
Katharine Hilbery is the granddaughter of a distinguished poet and belongs to a privileged class. Though her family is literary, Katharine secretly prefers mathematics and astronomy. Early in the novel, Katharine becomes engaged to William Rodney. After a time they end their engagement so that Rodney can explore a relationship with Katharine's cousin, Cassandra Otway. Eventually, Katharine agrees to marry Ralph Denham.

Katharine's mother, Mrs Margaret Hilbery, plays a significant role in Katharine's life, while Katharine's father, Mr Trevor Hilbery, is only seen on a few occasions. Mr Hilbery registers his disapproval of the actions of Katharine and her friends when he learns that she and William have broken their engagement so that William could become engaged to Cassandra. Although Mary and Katharine are the primary women characters, Katharine does not often interact with Mary. Katharine is a very solitary person, and she struggles to reconcile her need for personal freedom with her notions of love.

Hilbery is often read as being loosely based on Woolf's sister, Vanessa Bell.

=== Ralph Denham ===
Ralph Denham is a lawyer who occasionally writes articles for a journal edited by Trevor Hilbery, Katharine's father. Unlike a few other characters in the novel, he has to work to make a living and take care of his family: his mother, a widow, and several siblings. He makes his first appearance in the novel at the Hilberys' tea party. He leaves the party saying "She'll do...Yes, Katharine Hilbery'll do...I'll take Katharine Hilbery" (p 24), and from this point Ralph is in constant pursuit of Katharine. He repeatedly follows Katharine through the streets of London and often passes her house, hoping to see her inside.

Ralph's relationship with William Rodney is relatively formal, while Ralph's relationship with Mary is more friendly. At one point in the story Ralph realises Mary's love for him and he proposes to her; however, Mary has already realised he loves Katharine and rejects his proposal.

=== Mary Datchet ===
Mary Datchet, the daughter of a country vicar, works in the office of an organisation that campaigns for the enactment of women's suffrage. Though she could live comfortably without working, Mary chooses to work. Mary can be considered an example of the ideal Virginia Woolf detailed in A Room of One's Own, "Professions for Women" (one essay in The Death of the Moth and Other Essays, Harcourt, 1942, pp. 236–8), and other feminist essays.

Mary's romantic life is short-lived and unsuccessful. She falls wildly in love with Ralph Denham, and wishes to move to the country with him. However, when he finally proposes to her, she rejects him, deeming him insincere. Mary also serves as an emotional outlet for the other characters, especially Ralph and Katharine. Whenever Ralph, Katharine, or the other characters need to tell someone about their love or anguish, they always go for tea at Mary's. She remains unwed at the novel's end.

Mary Datchet has sometimes been read as being based on Woolf's friend and suffrage campaigner, Margaret Llewelyn Davies.

=== William Rodney ===
William is a frustrated poet and dramatist, who often subjects others to his mediocre works. He is Katharine's first romantic interest, but he is largely attracted by her grandfather's status as one of the greatest English poets. William often tries to impress Katharine without realising his limitations. After Katharine decides not to marry him, William becomes interested in Katharine's cousin, Cassandra Otway. While Katharine represents the new generation's ideas about marriage, Cassandra—in William's mind, at least—represents conventional Victorian ideas about marriage in which the wife serves her husband. At the end of the novel, William and Cassandra are engaged.

=== Other characters ===
The story, though it centres on Katharine, Ralph, Mary, and William, is dotted with minor characters who appear for the most part only at the various tea parties. They include:

- Cassandra Otway, Katharine's cousin who becomes engaged to William
- Henry, Katharine's cousin and Cassandra's brother
- Trevor and Margaret Hilbery, Katharine's parents
- Mr Datchet
- Mrs Cosham
- Aunt Celia
- Cyril, Katharine's cousin who has two children with the woman he is living with, but not married to; he represents the new age of modern ideas about marriage and relationships
- Mr Clacton and Mrs Seal, Mary's co-workers in the office of a pro-suffrage organisation
- Mr Basnett
- Joan, Ralph's sister
- Harry Sandys, an old college friend of Ralph
- Mrs Denham, Ralph's mother

== Style ==
Night and Day is the longest of Woolf's novels and is written in a largely realist prose style that, compared to Woolf's other more experimental works, is sometimes seen as an anomaly within her oeuvre. Woolf herself would later disavow the realism of Night and Day, describing it as flat in a diary entry in 1925.

More recently, critics have pointed out that while the prose style is more conventional, there are some aspects, such as fragmentation of language, that resemble Woolf's later, more boldly experimental works. Sayaka Okumura has pointed out that the structure of the novel is one of fluidity, with the second half containing more action and its chapters covering wider expanses of time than those in the first half.

== Critical and scholarly reception ==
The novel received a mixed public reception on its initial publication. It received a warm review in The Times Literary Supplement and Ford Madox Ford praised it in the Picadilly Review. However, Katherine Mansfield was more critical in her review for the Athenaeum Magazine, describing it as a Victorian throwback that was out of touch with the times, especially in its ellision of any mention of World War I. Privately Mansfield was even more scornful, describing it as a 'lie in the soul'.

In her diary, Woolf records how E M Forster told her that he liked it less than her previous novel, The Voyage Out.

Due to its style, the novel initially saw far less scholarly attention than Woolf's other works and has often been 'dogged by critical arguments about its Victorian or incipient modernist status'. Woolf scholar Mary Wilson, in a survey of criticism on the novel, has observed a pattern in the scholarship in which scholars still tend to be defensive of the text, approaching it as a book that needs to be 'critically rescued' and its value asserted before anything else can be said of it.

== Adaptation ==
A film adaptation, directed by Tina Gharavi, with a cast including Haley Bennett, Lily Allen, Jack Whitehall and Timothy Spall was released in the United Kingdom in June 2026. Entitled "Virginia Woolf's Night and Day", the film departs from many of the novel's plot points.
