= Potting On =

- Genre: Sitcom
- Running time: 30 minutes
- Country of origin: United Kingdom
- Language: English
- Home station: BBC Radio 4
- Starring: Pam Ayres; Geoffrey Whitehead
- Written by: Chris Thompson; Peter Reynolds; Pam Ayres (extra material)
- Produced by: Clare Jones
- Original release: 27 February – 2 April 2008
- No. of series: 1
- No. of episodes: 6
- Opening theme: "Young at Heart"
- Website: At BBC Radio 4

Potting On is a radio situation comedy broadcast on BBC Radio 4. It stars poet and author Pam Ayres and veteran actor Geoffrey Whitehead as an aging couple running a garden centre with the help of various oddball employees. The supporting cast includes Trevor Bannister, Alex Tregear, and Karl Theobald. The show is written by Chris Thompson and Peter Reynolds.

== Plot ==
Pam (Pam Ayres) and Gordon (Geoffrey Whitehead) are a long-married couple who run a small garden centre. Gordon is a creature of habit while Pam longs to break out of her humdrum routine. The humour revolves around her efforts to persuade him to try something new, or at least stop holding her back. For instance, for their annual holiday, Gordon is content to return to their caravan which has been parked for years in Swanage, while she tries to organize a trip to some exotic location overseas, or at least somewhere other than Swanage.

Other employees also appear including teenager Carol, the cashier, who is a modern girl and has an array of boyfriends, naïve deputy manager Dave who has an attraction to Carol, and bizarre elderly gardener Roy who occasionally has a good idea.

== Format ==
Geoffrey Whitehead's role is to set up situations into which Pam Ayres delivers punchlines in her distinctive brogue. For example, in an episode where Gordon becomes obsessed by an Indiana Jones-style computer game and stays up till the early hours of the morning, there is the following exchange:

Gordon: I'm trying to find the hidden treasures of Nefertiti!
Pam: Well come to bed then, I'll make sure you get yer 'ands on 'em!

The same actors portray Pam and Gordon in sketches on the comedy and poetry show Ayres on the Air.

== Cast ==
- Pam Grant - Pam Ayres
- Gordon Grant - Geoffrey Whitehead
- Carol - Alex Tregear
- Dave - Karl Theobald
- Roy - Trevor Bannister

== Episodes ==
| No. | Title | Original release date |
|---|---|---|
| 1 | "Stones" | 27 February 2008 |
Pam is disappointed at the lack of excitement in her life as husband Gordon prefers rigid order. She decides on attending a music concert which puts her at odds with Gordon's quest to join the bowls club board.
| 2 | "Taking a Break" | 5 March 2008 |
A stock take at the garden centre is ongoing as Carol suggests they take a holiday abroad, and leave the running of the business to her, Dave and Roy. However, Gordon prefers the regular jaunt to Swanage in a caravan.
| 3 | "Curse of the Pharaoh" | 12 March 2008 |
Gordon has taken to spending his time playing a computer game in lieu of the garden centre accounts which he has handed off to Dave. Pam is also feeling unwanted and takes the opportunity to get a dog named Marmite.
| 4 | "Wedding" | 19 March 2008 |
Gordon decides on buying things from notoriously dodgy wholesalers, Waynes. Due to attend a wedding with Pam, he also uses them for the purchase of a wedding gift, however the order delivery fails to go as planned.
| 5 | "Flab" | 26 March 2008 |
Pam believes her husbands laziness is causing him to put on weight, and challenges Gordon to a weight-loss contest. However, Gordon decides he can win the contest without changing his habits, leading to Pam having suspicions.
| 6 | "Something for Me" | 2 April 2008 |
Pam wins five thousand pounds on the Premium Bonds, which leads to arguments with Gordon about how the money should be spent. A sports car is the object of her desires, but the love of her husband eventually comes first.

== Broadcast history ==
The show was broadcast originally on BBC Radio 4, with repeat broadcasts airing on BBC Radio 7 and BBC Radio 4 Extra.
