= Trust (1999 film) =

British television crime drama

- Genre: Crime drama
- Written by: Richard McBrien
- Directed by: David Drury
- Starring: Mark Strong; Caroline Goodall; Nathaniel Parker; John McGlynn; Caroline Strong; Roger Griffiths; Joseph Kpobie; John Grillo; Aneirin Hughes
- Composer: Robert Lockhart
- Country of origin: United Kingdom
- Original language: English
- No. of series: 1
- No. of episodes: 2

Production
- Executive producer: Jill Green
- Producer: Julia Stannard
- Cinematography: Peter Middleton
- Editor: Ian Farr
- Running time: 90 minutes
- Production companies: Greenlit Productions; Red Rooster Film & Television Entertainment

Original release
- Network: ITV
- Release: 4 May – 5 May 1999

Trust is a British television crime drama, written by Richard McBrien and directed by David Drury, that was first broadcast on ITV on 4 May 1999. Originally broadcast in two parts, and also re-cut into three episodes for international broadcast, Trust stars Mark Strong as psychiatrist Michael Mitcham, who is accused of the murder of one of former patients, with whom he fathered a child. Meanwhile, his wife, Anne (Caroline Goodall), a successful solicitor, begins an affair with Michael's best friend, Andrew (Nathaniel Parker), who brings Michael's credibility into question during the trial for the crimes he is accused of.

The film was broadcast on BBC America on 1 January 2007 as the first in a series of five British thrillers previously unbroadcast in the United States. The film was also released on DVD in Germany in 2004, but this remains the only home video release to date. Notably, the DVD features audio dubbing in German, rather than subtitles.

== Broadcast ==
The two parts of Trust attracted 8.24 and 7.76 million viewers respectively.

== Reception ==
Adam Sweeting from The Guardian gave the film a mixed review, writing: "The term 'psychological thriller' is often used when 'routine whodunnit' would have been quite sufficient, but Trust genuinely fits the bill. Director David Drury has piled on the warning signals and the emotional turbulence. The background music is an eerie, oppressive mix of lurid orchestral writing and technological effects. Michael and Anne's home is like a three-dimensional model of the killer's diseased brain, with the camera stalking the open-plan walkways to peer through its glass walls like a murderous voyeur. The closing sequence was a mordant parody of the shower scene in Psycho, all panicky close-ups and shrieking violins."

== Cast ==
- Mark Strong as Michael Mitcham
- Caroline Goodall as Anne Travers
- Nathaniel Parker as Andrew Pearce
- John McGlynn as DI Jim Hinton
- Caroline Strong as DS Sarah Miller
- Roger Griffiths as Trevor Macer
- Joseph Kpobie as Joshua Macer
- John Grillo as Dr. Ian Matthews
- Aneirin Hughes as Neil Davis
- Robert Lang as Nathan Anderson
- Georgia Mackenzie as Tara Reeves
- Felicity Montagu as Beth Simpson
- Hugh Simon as Geoff Keens
- Patrick Field as Vere
- Abigail Thaw as Caroline
- Pip Torrens as Jenkins
- Mark Umbers as Simon
