= Janine Jansen: Falling for Stradivari =

- Directed by: Gerald Fox
- Produced by: Justine Waddell; Gerald Fox
- Starring: Janine Jansen
- Cinematography: Douglas Hartington
- Edited by: Devendra Murudeshwar
- Production companies: Asterik Films and Foxy Films
- Distributed by: Poorhouse International
- Release date: 2 September 2021
- Running time: 1 hour 21 minutes
- Country: United Kingdom
- Language: English

Janine Jansen: Falling for Stradivari is a documentary film released in 2021 and was presented by Asterisk Films and Foxy Films in association with Sky Arts. It is a film about a violin maker, Antonio Stradivari told through the eyes of Janine Jansen. The film was directed by Gerald Fox, produced by Justine Waddell, featuring Janine Jansen. The film premiered at Curzon Mayfair and then released on other cinemas across the UK before its television premiere on Sky Arts and Now TV.

== Plot ==
Janine Jansen: Falling for Stradivari follows Dutch musician Janine Jansen as she learns more about Stradivarius violins. The documentary, directed by Gerry Fox, follows Jansen as she prepares for a one-of-a-kind show with twelve of the most beautiful Stradivari violins in the world. Each one has its unique history and sound.

In the movie, Jansen works with veteran violin maker and teacher Steven Smith, who shows her how to choose and play these beautiful instruments. It shows Jansen's careful planning, her close link with the violins, and how hard it is to learn how to play each one.

"Falling for Stradivari" is both a celebration of Jansen's fantastic skill and an ode to Antonio Stradivari's timeless art. His violins are still some of the most sought after in the world. The quest to record an album on 12 of the world's most beloved Stradivari violins will be initiated by Netherlands virtuoso Janine Jansen and Royal Opera Director Antonio Pappano.

== Production ==
A film about the finest violin maker, Antonio Stradivari, told through the eyes of Janine Jansen, as she went through a mission to record an album on twelve of his greatest ever violin performances, a unique project made by Steven Smith with J&A Beare. Janine Jansen: Falling for Stradivari brilliantly captures the emotional highs and lows as Jansen reacts to each violin, her excitement combined with trepidation as the first day of the recording gets nearer.

== Reception ==
The Guardian film critic Peter Bradshaw called it "a lovely documentary." Falling for Stradivari was the winner of the Czech Television Award at the Golden Prague Awards 2021 and was nominated for Official Selection for the 40th FIFA.
