= Andrew Stewart (rugby union) =

Scottish rugby union player & Scottish rugby union President

- Born: Andrew Ruthven Stewart; 1913 Jedburgh, Scotland
- Died: 1989 (aged 75–76) Melrose, Scotland
- School: George Watson's College

Rugby union career
- Position: Centre
Amateur team(s)
Years	Team	Apps	(Points)
1933–45	Jed-Forest		
Provincial / State sides
Years	Team	Apps	(Points)
- South of Scotland District

76th President of the Scottish Rugby Union
- In office 1962–1963
- Preceded by: Robert Ledingham
- Succeeded by: Herbert Waddell

Major Andrew Stewart (1913–1989) was a Scottish rugby union player. He was the 76th president of the Scottish Rugby Union.

== Rugby Union career ==
=== Amateur career ===
He played for Jed-Forest. He captained the club.

He took part in one post Second World War match for Jed-Forest and stated it took a fortnight to recover. He then quit as a player.

=== Provincial career ===
He played for South of Scotland District against North of Scotland District.

=== Administrative career ===
He became President of Jed-Forest in 1952.

He was elected on the SRU committee in 1954 as a South of Scotland District representative. He gave up the president post at Jed-Forest when he joined the SRU.

He was elected vice-president of the SRU in 1961.

He became the 76th president of the Scottish Rugby Union. He served the standard one year from 1962 to 1963.

Stewart looked forward to the role: 'It will be fine to have the chance of assuring some of the smaller clubs that they are not in the wilderness.'

== Outside of rugby ==
Stewart was a tweed manufacturer in Jedburgh.

He served as a Major in the 4th King's Own Scottish Borderers.

Both his uncle Charles William Stewart and father George Stewart played for Jed-Forest. His father was also a secretary and president of the club.
