= Robert Ledingham =

Scottish rugby union player

- Born: Robert Mackay Ledingham; 27 February 1893 Aberdeen, Scotland
- Died: 27 February 1969 (aged 76) Aberdeen, Scotland
- University: University of Aberdeen

Rugby union career
- Position: Forward
Amateur team(s)
Years	Team	Apps	(Points)
1911-14	Aberdeen GSFP		
Provincial / State sides
Years	Team	Apps	(Points)
1911	North of Scotland District		

75th President of the Scottish Rugby Union
- In office 1961–1962
- Preceded by: David Kerr
- Succeeded by: Andrew Stewart

Major Robert Ledingham (27 February 1893 - 27 February 1969) was a Scottish rugby union player. He was the 75th President of the Scottish Rugby Union.

== Rugby Union career ==
=== Amateur career ===
He played for Aberdeen GSFP.

He played in the North of Scotland cup for Aberdeen GSFP against Panumure on 30 March 1912. Panmure won the match 6 - 3.

=== Provincial career ===
The North of Scotland District held a trial match for selection in 1911. Two sides were organised: the Reds and the Blue & Whites. Ledingham was in the Reds side.

He did enough to secure a space in the North XV which played Midlands District on 4 November 1911.

=== Administrative career ===
He was elected to the Scottish Rugby Union board in 1927, representing the North of Scotland District.

He became the 75th President of the Scottish Rugby Union. He served the standard one year from 1961 to 1962.

A dinner was held at Aberdeen University to celebrate Ledingham being elected President of the SRU. It was remarked that he had been club secretary for 42 years.

He opened the new floodlights at Kelso in 1961.

== Military career ==
Ledingham joined the 4th Gordons in 1910 as a private.

In 1912 he joined the 1st Highland Brigade R. F. A. When the First World War started he was sent to France and was there for 3 years. He was gassed in March 1918.

He was demobilised in 1919 with the rank of captain.

He joined the Territorial Army and served with the 75th Brigade (Royal Artillery). He made the rank of major in 1933 joining the Reserve of Officers.

In the Second World War he joined the 126th Field Regiment of the Royal Artillery but he was invalided from the army in April 1940.

He was appointed to command the Aberdeen Works Battalion of the Aberdeen Home Guard in 1940.

He was made acting Lieutenant Colonel in February 1945.

== Law career ==
Ledingham was an advocate. He graduated from Aberdeen University with a law degree in 1913. He won a prize for his work on International Law at the university in 1914. He was a partner in the firm Edmonds and Ledingham. His father Alexander Ledingham was also an advocate.

== Other interests ==
He came third in Scottish Inter-University Sports in the 120 yards dash in 1913. He was a runner-up in the 1920 Aberdeen University Sports Day in the 120 years dash.

He was a keen tennis player, playing in the Stonehaven Open of 1921. He played for the Osborne tennis club.

He was the Honorary Secretary and Treasurer of the South Aberdeen Unionist Association. However he resigned his position on being elected auditor to the Sheriff Court in 1934.

He was Treasurer of the Aberdeen Philosophical Society.

== Death ==
He died in 1969. He is buried at the Springbank Cemetery in Aberdeen, alongside his father.
