= Herbert Waddell =

British Lions & Scotland international rugby union player

- Born: Herbert Waddell; 19 September 1902 Scotland
- Died: 5 January 1988 (aged 85) Erskine, Scotland
- School: The Glasgow Academy; Fettes College

Rugby union career
- Position: Fly-half
Amateur team(s)
Years	Team	Apps	(Points)
- Glasgow Academicals RFC
Provincial / State sides
Years	Team	Apps	(Points)
- Glasgow District
International career
Years	Team	Apps	(Points)
1924–1930	Scotland	15	(45)
1924	British and Irish Lions	3	(0)
1924-1929	Barbarians		

77th President of the Scottish Rugby Union
- In office 1963–1964
- Preceded by: Andrew Stewart
- Succeeded by: Ross Logan

Herbert Waddell (19 September 1902 – 5 January 1988) was a Scottish rugby union fly-half who played club rugby for Glasgow Academicals and international rugby for Scotland and the British Isles. Waddell was heavily involved with the invitational tourist team, the Barbarians, not only playing for the club, but also becoming its fifth president in 1973

== Personal life ==
Waddell was born in Scotland in 1902 and was first educated at The Glasgow Academy before switching to Fettes College and later completing his education in France. Waddell fought in the British Army during the Second World War, commanding the 11th Highland Light Infantry. He remained with the 11th during their change to a tank unit, commanding the second battalion, the 141st regiment RAC. Waddell finished the war with a Mention in Dispatches and the rank of full Colonel.

He was the father of the rugby player Gordon Waddell.

== Rugby Union career ==
=== Amateur career ===
Waddell became a keen rugby player whilst a schoolboy and captained the Fettes College team. On leaving education he joined Glasgow Academicals, a team he would represent throughout his international career.

=== Provincial career ===
Waddell played for Glasgow District.

=== International career ===
Waddell first represented Scotland in the opening game of the 1924 Five Nations Championship, played against France. Although Scotland lost, Waddell scored his first international in the game with a dropped goal, and was reselected for the rest of the tournament. During the 1924 Championship, Waddell scored a try in a humiliating win over Wales, and a pair of tries in a home victory over Ireland. Although the tournament ended in a poor loss to the eventual champions, England, it turned into a good year for Waddell, with an invitation to tour with the Barbarians immediately after the England game; and then selected to represent the British Isles on their tour of South Africa.

The South African tour turned into a difficult and injury prone affair, with the British losing three of the four tests. Waddell played in all three loses, missing the Third Test, a draw at Port Elizabeth, when he was replaced by Bill Cunningham. On his return to Britain, Waddell was back in the Scotland team for the 1925 Championship, which saw Scotland win all four matches and take their first Grand Slam. Waddell played in two of the wins, away to Ireland at Lansdowne Road and the first International at Murrayfield, a narrow victory over England. Waddell scored a dropped goal in both matches. Waddell played for Scotland a further nine times, bringing his total caps for his country to 15. His final game was during the 1930 Five Nations Championship, having missed the 1928 and 1929 tournaments due to an ulcer and then a shoulder injury.

=== Administrative career ===
In 1926, Waddell was elected to the Committee of the Barbarians, a rarity for a member who was still a player. In 1956 he was elected vice-president, and in 1974 succeeded Brigadier Glyn Hughes as president.

He became the 77th President of the Scottish Rugby Union. He served the standard one year from 1963 to 1964.
