= Johnny Maxwell =

Fictional character created by Terry Pratchett

Johnny Maxwell is a fictional character in a series of three children's books by Terry Pratchett. He is a young boy (twelve in the first book, but a teenager in the later ones) living in the (fictional) typical late-20th-century Northern English town of Blackbury (also the setting of Pratchett's Truckers). Blackbury had also previously appeared as a setting for some of the stories Pratchett wrote for Children's Circle section of the Bucks Free Press. Johnny has a difficult home life. Over the course of the three books his parents split up and he and his mother move in with his grandfather. This may be why he starts seeing things no one else sees, including an alien surrender party, ghosts and a time travelling bag lady. On the other hand, it is possible that he sees them because they are actually there and he lacks the filters that stop most people noticing how amazing the world is (a favourite theme of Pratchett's).

Apart from this tendency Johnny is almost unnaturally normal. His friend Kirsty often gets exasperated by his tendency to simply accept that strange things happen to him, rather than doing something about it. He has a strong sense of fair play, which leads to him fighting for what's right even when he has no idea what's going on.

Pratchett has said that Johnny is based, very loosely, on an idea of what Richmal Crompton's Just William character would be like in a 1990s setting.

== The Gang ==
Johnny has a sort of a gang consisting of the kids who hang around with each other because they don't fit into any of the school cliques. They are:

- Stephen 'Wobbler' Johnson. Johnny's best friend and the second main character in the book. He is overweight and heavily into computers, an expert at piracy. He wants to be a nerd, but they wouldn't let him join. It is his considered opinion that Johnny is mental. His real name is Stephen Johnson in the books, although the television adaptation of Johnny and the Bomb gives it as Walter. In Johnny and the Bomb Wobbler got stuck in 1941- due to the gang's actions in the past accidentally changing history so that he was never born and therefore couldn't return to the future where he didn't exist- and grew up to be a billionaire calling himself Sir John (Sir Walter in the TV version) but, due to the time travel and multiple timelines involved, where and if this happened is questionable. Certainly a Wobbler returned successfully from 1941.
- Simon 'Bigmac' Wrigley. An asthmatic skinhead who is deeply embarrassed by his instinctive grasp of mathematics. He lives with his brother in a rundown tower block on the edge of Blackbury. He is not exactly a criminal but has a confused grasp of car ownership. He has a casual friendship with Yo-less, and shows confusion when he is asked to justify why he has a jacket covered in swastikas and pro-Hitler slogans. Wrigley hides his true emotions, and, as seen in Only You Can Save Mankind overtries to be, as he puts it "hard", hanging out near pubs with boys years older than he is. Wrigley is constantly bullied by his older brother, although he knocks his brother out during Johnny and the Dead. He is strangely intelligent, and is probably the third most intelligent in the gang, after Kirsty and Yo-less. A running gag is his attraction to cars with the keys still in the ignition. He has apparently stolen and crashed the Minister of Education's car, and was thrown into juvenile hall. His favourite band is Heavy Mental. Wrigley's best friend is undoubtedly Wobbler, while he appears to dislike Kirsty.
- Yo-less. A "technically" black boy, so nicknamed by Johnny because he doesn't say "Yo!". Interested in Star Trek, train spotting, Morris dancing and brass band music. He only said 'check it out' in the supermarket, and the only person he ever called a mother was his mother. Yo-less said it was racial stereotyping to say all black kids acted like that but, however you looked at it, Yo-less had been born with a defective cool.
- Kirsty. (Also known as Sigourney, Kimberly, Klytemnestra and Kasandra). Unlike the rest of the gang, Kirsty is a highly organised person who knows exactly where she's going in life. She is highly intelligent but has very poor people skills, something she views as a character flaw in everyone else. She is trying to get Johnny's life organised since he is clearly incapable of doing it himself, but hasn't realised that he doesn't especially want his life organised. He finds her very easy to talk to since she never listens. Kirsty has a tendency to romanticise things, hidden beneath her practicality and finds Johnny's down-to-Earth attitude to things almost as annoying as his lack of direction.

== Recurring characters ==
- Mrs Tachyon
- Sergeant Comely
- Arthur Maxwell

== The novels ==
The Johnny Maxwell books are:

- Only You Can Save Mankind
- Johnny and the Dead
- Johnny and the Bomb

== Other media ==
In 1995 a serial based on Johnny and the Dead was made for Children's ITV. Johnny was played by Andrew Falvery.

In 1996 BBC Radio 4 dramatised Only You Can Save Mankind. Johnny was played by Tim Smith.

A CBBC serial based on Johnny And The Bomb was broadcast in January 2006. Johnny was played by George MacKay.

== "I just see things other people don't see" ==
Regarding whether the things that happen to Johnny really do happen or are all a matter of perception, as Johnny escapes his problems by projecting fantasy onto reality, Pratchett has said:

I can't be having with that pernicious rubbish ... To Johnny it's all real, and that's what counts ... He deals with all the problems on their own terms and half the time he's projecting reality onto fantasy.... So: is what happens in the books real? Yes. Does it all happen in Johnny's head? Yes.
