= Mother's Milk (film) =

2011 British drama film

Mother's Milk is a 2011 British drama film directed by Gerald Fox.

Based on the 2006 novel of the same name by Edward St Aubyn, it explores the troubled relationships between the various members of an English family over a long summer.

It stars Thomas Underhill, Jack Davenport, Adrian Dunbar, Diana Quick, and Margaret Tyzack.
