= Edward St Aubyn =

British writer (born 1960)

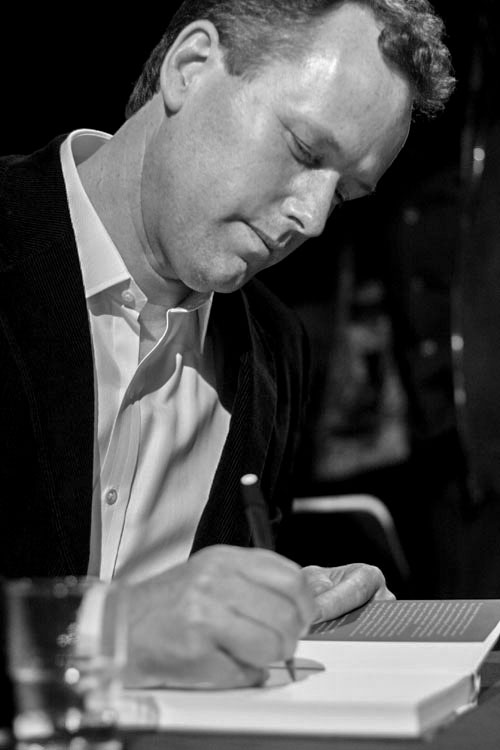
- St Aubyn in 2007
- Born: 1960 (age 65–66); London, England
- Education: Westminster School
- Alma mater: Keble College, Oxford
- Occupations: Author, journalist
- Spouse: Nicola Shulman (m. 1987; div. 1990)
- Writing career
- Notable work: Patrick Melrose series

Edward St Aubyn (born 1960) is an English author and journalist. He is the author of eleven novels, including notably the semi-autobiographical Patrick Melrose novels. In 2006, Mother's Milk was shortlisted for the Booker Prize.

== Early life and education ==
St Aubyn was born in 1960 in London, the son of Roger Geoffrey St Aubyn (1906–1985), a surgeon, and his second wife, Lorna Mackintosh (1929–2005). On his father's side, he is a great-great-grandson of Sir Edward St Aubyn, 1st Baronet, and a great-nephew of John St Aubyn, 1st Baron St Levan.

St Aubyn's father was first married to Sophie Helene Freiin von Puthon, daughter of Baron Heinrich Puthon, long-time president of the Salzburg Festival, whom he divorced in 1957. St Aubyn has two half-sisters from his father's first marriage, and an elder sister, Alexandra. He grew up in London and France, where his family had houses. He has described an unhappy childhood in which he was repeatedly raped by his sexually abusive father from the ages of 5 to 8, with the complicity of his mother. St. Aubyn later said of his father, "He had a small canvas, but he was as destructive as he could be. If he’d been given Cambodia, or China, I’m sure he would have done sterling work".

St Aubyn attended Sussex House and then Westminster School. In 1979 he went on to read English at Keble College, Oxford. At the time a heroin addict, he graduated with a pass, the lowest possible class of degree.

== Patrick Melrose series ==
Five of St Aubyn's novels, Never Mind, Bad News, Some Hope, Mother's Milk, and At Last, form The Patrick Melrose Novels, the first four of which were republished in a single volume in 2012, in anticipation of the fifth. They are based on the author's own life; the titular protagonist grows up in a highly dysfunctional upper-class English family, and deals with his father's sexual abuse, the deaths of both parents, alcoholism, heroin addiction and recovery, and marriage and parenthood.

The books have been hailed as an exploration of how emotional health can be carved out of childhood trauma.

Mother's Milk was made into a feature film released in 2011. The screenplay was written by St Aubyn and director Gerald Fox. It starred Jack Davenport, Adrian Dunbar, Diana Quick, and Margaret Tyzack in her last performance.

=== Adaptations ===
In 2018 a five-part television series, Patrick Melrose was broadcast, a joint production of Showtime and Sky Atlantic. Benedict Cumberbatch stars as Patrick Melrose (with the young Patrick played by Sebastian Maltz), with each episode based on a different novel in the series. The series premiered on Showtime on 12 May 2018 to favourable reviews.

== Awards and honours ==
- 1992 Betty Trask Award winner for Never Mind
- 1998 Guardian Fiction Prize shortlisted for On the Edge
- 2006 Man Booker Prize shortlisted for Mother's Milk
- 2007 Prix Femina Etranger winner for Mother's Milk
- 2007 South Bank Show award on literature winner for Mother's Milk
- 2011 elected Fellow of the Royal Society of Literature
- 2014 Bollinger Everyman Wodehouse Prize winner for Lost for Words

== Personal life ==
From 1987 to 1990, St Aubyn was married to the author Nicola Shulman, now Marchioness of Normanby.

He has a son by Jane Longman, daughter of publisher Mark Frederick Kerr Longman (1916–1972, head of the Longman Group Ltd) and Lady Elizabeth Mary Longman (née Lambart, 1924–2016). She was the elder daughter of Rudolph Lambart, 10th Earl of Cavan, and a bridesmaid and friend of Queen Elizabeth II.

== Works ==
- Never Mind. William Heinemann. 1992. ISBN 9780434734528.
- Bad News. William Heinemann. 1992. ISBN 9780434734535.
- Some Hope. William Heinemann. 1994. ISBN 9780434734542.
- On The Edge. Chatto & Windus. 1998. ISBN 978-1447253563.
- A Clue to the Exit. Chatto & Windus. 2000. ISBN 0701169605.
- Mother's Milk. Grove Press, Open City Books. 2005. ISBN 978-1890447403.
- At Last. Farrar, Straus and Giroux. 2012. ISBN 978-0374298890.
- Lost for Words. Farrar, Straus and Giroux. 2014. ISBN 9780374280291.
- Dunbar. Hogarth Press. 2017. ISBN 9781101904282.
- Double Blind. Harvill Secker. 2021. ISBN 9781787300255.
- Parallel Lines. Jonathan Cape, 2025. ISBN 9781787335592.
