= Tina Martin (television host) =

American television host and reporter

Tina Martin McDuffie is an American television host, reporter, professor and public speaker. McDuffie is an associate professor of the practice of journalism at Boston University. She is a public television program host and reporter. She hosts the World Channel/ WGBH series Local, USA and is a television and radio reporter and host for WGBH News in Boston. She is also a contributor on PBS News Hour and NPR. She received a regional Edward R. Murrow Award as part of a team of three reporters.

She graduated from Emerson College in Boston with a degree in broadcast journalism. She also received an award from the National Endowment for Financial Education. McDuffie has also won numerous other awards including 2 National Association of Black Journalists awards, 9 Telly Awards, & 2 Public Radio News Directors awards. McDuffie was inducted into the WERS radio Hall of Fame by her alma mater Emerson College in 2018. In 2022, she was named a Distinguished Alumni of Emerson College--the highest honor the university gives to alumni.

As of late 2022, McDuffie is working as the co-host of an original podcast with the Boston Globe. McDuffie is a sought after public speaker and gives an annual lecture at Harvard's TH Chan School of Public Health as part of a series on engaging with the press. She is a frequent presenter at the RTNDA (Radio Television News Digital Association) conference.
