= The Woman in White (1997 TV series) =

- Genre: Costume drama
- Based on: The Woman in White by Wilkie Collins
- Written by: David Pirie
- Directed by: Tim Fywell
- Starring: Tara Fitzgerald; Justine Waddell; Andrew Lincoln; Susan Vidler; James Wilby; Simon Callow; John Standing; Ian Richardson; Corin Redgrave
- Theme music composer: David Ferguson
- Countries of origin: United States; United Kingdom
- Original language: English
- No. of series: 1
- No. of episodes: 2

Production
- Executive producers: David M. Thompson; Ted Childs; Jonathan Powell; Rebecca Eaton
- Producer: Gareth Neame
- Cinematography: Richard Greatrex
- Editor: Robin Sales
- Running time: 125 minutes
- Production company: Carlton Television in association with WGBH Boston for BBC

Original release
- Network: BBC One
- Release: 28 December – 29 December 1997

The Woman in White (1997) is a BBC television adaptation based on the 1859 novel of the same name by Wilkie Collins. Unlike the epistolary style of the novel, the 2-hour dramatisation uses Marian as the main character. She bookends the film with her narration. It was nominated for the BAFTA TV Award for Best Drama Serial in 1998.

== Plot ==
Marian Fairlie (Tara Fitzgerald) and Laura Fairlie (Justine Waddell) are half-sisters (same father but different mothers). Laura's mother died, leaving Laura an inheritance which she will receive when she comes of age. They both live in Limmeridge with their uncle, Mr. Fairlie (Ian Richardson), who hires a new tutor, Walter Hartright (Andrew Lincoln). Marian tells Hartright that she and Laura are very close, agree in everything and refuse to be taught separately.

On the night Mr. Hartright arrives at Limmeridge, he bumps into a woman in white. She speaks cryptically, and inquires if he is to stay with the Fairlies. When a carriage arrives, she runs off. Mr. Gilmore, the Fairlies' attorney, tells him that the woman must have been a villager. When Hartright meets the two sisters, he mistakes Laura for the woman in white because of the strong resemblance.

As Mr. Hartright teaches the sisters, he grows especially fond of Laura. However, Marian makes it clear to him that her sister is already engaged to Sir Percival Glyde. Though she senses that something is not quite right, she cannot find fault in Sir Percival, who is kind, attentive, and rich. Laura and Mr. Hartright acknowledge their feelings for each other, but they cannot be together. Marian asks Hartright's help in tracking down the woman in white. Hartright agrees to stay outside at night to lure the woman in white. One night, Marian sees a servant girl rush out from the woods, screaming for help. Right behind her is Mr. Hartright, whom she accuses of trying to rape her. (The servant has been paid off by Glyde to frame Hartright.) Hartright is immediately disgraced and sent away, but not before he warns Laura that she is in great danger. Laura ignores him and marries Glyde.

When Laura returns from her honeymoon, Marian visits her and plans to stay for a while. However, Laura is not herself and refuses to speak to or even see Marian for four days. After Marian threatens to leave, Laura asks her sister to stay and soon reveals the terrible truth. Despite seeming to be kind, Sir Percival abuses his wife in private. She ultimately reveals that she is afraid her husband will kill her to steal her inheritance. Marian believes her and tells Laura to lock Sir Percival out of her room at night.

Glyde's foreign friend, Count Fosco, arrives. Before dinner, Laura is pressured into signing a document, but Glyde refuses to let her read it. Fosco, realizing that he must appear to be on her side, tells Glyde to stop trying to force her to sign it. Angered by her defiance, Glyde throws the papers into the fire and storms out. Meanwhile, the woman in white has reappeared; her name is Anne Catherick and she has run away from an asylum. Marian confides in Fosco about a secret meeting with Anne Catherick. The sisters try to help Anne by giving her food and clothing. Anne tells them that Sir Percival has a terrible secret. But before Anne can tell them, Glyde shows up with Fosco and they capture Anne. Anne mistakenly thinks that Marian and Laura betrayed her.

Marian and Laura try to escape to Limmeridge, but their plans are foiled by Glyde's servant Baxter, who shoots at them as they sprint toward the roads. They run back to the house.

Later Marian goes out to the ledge to spy on Count Fosco and Glyde. She overhears them saying that Marian and Laura are to be separated before breakfast. However, Marian accidentally pushes something which crashes off the balcony. They look to see who is there, while Marian jumps from the balcony to the ground and breaks her ankle. She hides in the woods in the rain until they go back to the house. When she returns to her room, she locks the door and sleeps under her bed while telling herself to wake up before breakfast to warn Laura. But Marian develops a fever and goes into delirium. People break into her room and force her to drink something. While ill, she dreams of her sister being drugged and thrown off the tower. She wakes up and Mr. Gilmore informs her that Anne has been placed in an asylum and Laura has committed suicide by jumping off the tower.

Unwilling to believe her sister would kill herself, Marian promises to avenge her sister's death. Count Fosco discovers her snooping through his things, and she is thrown out in disgrace. Her uncle will provide a small allowance to her but she can never return to Limmeridge. She finds help in a drunken Mr. Hartright who after losing his honor because of the false accusation of the servant Margaret, now makes a living by doing cheap portrait sketches. Marian and Hartright feel guilty for failing to save Laura, but they vow that they will not fail to help Anne Catherick.

Marian visits Anne's doctor, under the guise of being ill. When he refuses to reveal Anne's whereabouts, Marian threatens to tell his clients in the waiting room that he made improper advances to her. He tells her that Anne's mother was a servant of Marian's father. Anne was born out of wedlock and both Anne and her mother were sent to Glyde's parents. Anne had first sought his help after having been "morally degraded" at the age of twelve. He reveals the location of her asylum, and tells Marian that Anne placed a lock of hair in Marian's father's grave when he died.

At the asylum, Marian and Hartright are told that Anne is docile but is still given drugs for delusions. They go to her room where a woman dressed in white is staring at the wall. As Marian approaches her, she realizes that it is not Anne, but her sister Laura! They take Laura away from there, but Laura is at first catatonic.

Baxter observes Marian and Mr. Hartright going to Marian's father's grave. Hartright digs up the coffin and finds a box filled with a lock of Anne's hair, a will, and Anne's diary. They read the documents in the church adjacent to the graveyard. They discover that Anne is another half-sister (the product of her father's indiscretions with Anne's mother), that Sir Percival had raped Anne when she was only 12 years old, and that because of this, his father wrote him out of his will. Suddenly, Glyde appears out of hiding, knocks out Hartright and sets the papers on fire. Marian accidentally knocks over a lamp which sets the church alight. Afraid that Glyde is going to kill her, she runs away and locks the doors behind her, trapping him in the church. She manages to drag Hartright's body away from the flames. Then, she changes her mind and runs back to help Sir Percival, but the flames have begun to engulf him. Glyde repeats the words, "forgive me" as he burns. Hartright leads Marian away from the church as it explodes and says that the fire will be seen as an accident.

Back at Limmeridge, the sisters' uncle Fairlie makes a public announcement that Mr. Hartright was falsely accused. It is revealed that a conspiracy led to Laura's name appearing on Anne's grave marker and to the false imprisonment of Laura. Hartright announces his engagement to Laura, who has been restored to sanity. Laura and Mr. Hartright marry and have two children. At the end, Marian reflects that her father's abuse of Anne's mother started a cycle of abuse. Marian picks up her niece and prays that the cycle has ended.

== Cast ==
Character	Actor	Description
Marian Fairlie	Tara Fitzgerald	Laura's half-sister
Laura, Lady Glyde (née Fairlie)	Justine Waddell	Marian's half-sister, Sir Percival's wife
Walter Hartright	Andrew Lincoln	Tutor to the Fairlie sisters
Anne Catherick	Susan Vidler	The mysterious woman in white
Sir Percival Glyde	James Wilby	Laura's husband
Count Fosco	Simon Callow	Sir Percival's conspirator
Mr. Gilmore	John Standing	The Fairlies' lawyer
Mr. Fairlie	Ian Richardson	Marian and Laura's uncle
Dr. Kidson	Corin Redgrave	Anne's doctor
