= Tess of the D'Urbervilles (1998 TV serial) =

1998 British television serial

- Written by: Ted Whitehead (adaptation)
- Directed by: Ian Sharp
- Starring: Justine Waddell; Jason Flemyng; Oliver Milburn; John McEnery; Lesley Dunlop; Rosalind Knight; Anthony O'Donnell; Christine Moore; Bryan Pringle; Debbie Chazen
- Composer: Alan Lisk
- Country of origin: United Kingdom
- Original language: English
- No. of series: 1
- No. of episodes: 2

Production
- Executive producers: Sally Head; Delia Fine
- Producer: Sarah Wilson
- Running time: 175 minutes
- Production companies: A&E Productions; LWT

Original release
- Network: ITV
- Release: 8 March – 9 March 1998

Tess of the D'Urbervilles is a three-hour television serial made by LWT, first broadcast on ITV between 8 and 9 March 1998, adapted for television by Ted Whitehead and directed by Ian Sharp and starring Justine Waddell, based on Thomas Hardy's 1891 book Tess of the d'Urbervilles.

== Production ==
This serial of Tess of the D'Urbervilles was co-produced by London Weekend Television in partnership with the Arts and Entertainment Network of the US, which at the time was beginning to rival PBS in part-funding and broadcasting high quality British productions.

== Cast ==
- Justine Waddell as Tess Durbeyfield
- Jason Flemyng as Alec D'Urberville
- Oliver Milburn as Angel Clare
- John McEnery as Jack Durbeyfield
- Lesley Dunlop as Joan Durbeyfield
- Rosalind Knight as Mrs D'Urberville
- Anthony O'Donnell as Crick
- Christine Moore as Mrs Crick
- Bryan Pringle as Kail
- Debbie Chazen as Marian
- Linda Armstrong as Car Darch
- Hannah Waterman as Nancy
- Charlotte Bellamy as Cissie
- Candida Rundle as Izzy
- Amanda Brewster as Retty
- Russell Morgan as Boy with Wheelbarrow
