= Mother's Milk (novel) =

2012 novel by Edward St Aubyn

First edition (publ. Grove Press)

Mother's Milk is a novel by Edward St Aubyn. The 279-page book is a sequel to the trilogy Some Hope that St Aubyn wrote in the 1990s. Mother's Milk was written in 2006 and was short listed for the Booker Prize that year. It was republished in a single volume with Never Mind, Bad News and Some Hope in 2012. All four novels are based on the author's life growing up in an upper-class English family and deal with issues including alcoholism, heroin addiction, parent-child relationships, and child molestation.

In 2012, the book was adapted into a film directed by Gerry Fox and co-written by St Aubyn. The film starred Jack Davenport, Adrian Dunbar, Diana Quick, and Margaret Tyzack.

== Synopsis ==
The novel recounts the vicissitudes of the family of Patrick and Mary Melrose; it is divided into four parts, each being the month of August in the years 2000 to 2003. They have two sons, Robert who is five when the novel opens, and Thomas who is born in that year. The family lives in London. Patrick is in his early forties. He is a barrister, though not a very busy one.

Mary is totally devoted to her children, especially Thomas. She is no longer a sexual partner for her husband, who has an affair and, when that ends, turns to drink.

Patrick’s mother, Eleanor, is incapacitated by a stroke, and lives in a nursing-home in France. Eleanor’s family was once immensely rich, but her mother bequeathed most of the wealth to her second husband (Eleanor’s stepfather), a French aristocratic adventurer. The asset remaining, which should in due course become Patrick’s, is a house and land in Saint-Nazaire, France. However, Eleanor has fallen under the influence of a charlatan-guru, Seamus, an Irishman, a former nurse, who heads a so-called self-discovery foundation, and she has in effect given the property to him. At present Patrick’s family still has the right to stay in the house in August each year, but Seamus contrives to take that right away from them.

Eleanor requests to be moved to a nursing-home in London, which enables Seamus to take full control. In London she asks Patrick to kill her. He arranges for her to travel to Switzerland, where she can be legally assisted to commit suicide, but almost at the last minute she writes a new instruction, “Do nothing.” Patrick makes his own interpretation of these words: he will never visit her again.
