= Jeremy Mortimer =

British radio director and producer

- Occupations: radio drama director; producer
- Years active: 1990s–present
- Notable work: A Tale of Two Cities (2012); The Pattern of Painful Adventures (2008); Daphnis and Chloe (2006); Philomel Cottage (2002); The Time Machine (2009); Troy Trilogy (1998)
- Parents: Sir John Mortimer; Penelope Mortimer
- Relatives: Emily Mortimer (half-sister)
- Awards: Bronze Sony Radio Academy Award (2012)

Jeremy Mortimer is a British director and producer of radio dramas for BBC Radio. He won the 2012 Bronze Sony Radio Academy Award for Best Drama with A Tale of Two Cities.

== Life ==
Jeremy Mortimer is the son of Sir John Mortimer and Penelope Mortimer and the half-brother of Emily Mortimer.

Mortimer's credits include The Pattern of Painful Adventures (BBC Radio 3, 2008) and radio adaptations of Daphnis and Chloe (BBC Radio 4, 2006), Philomel Cottage (Radio 4, 2002) and The Time Machine (Radio 3, 2009). His production of the Troy Trilogy, which featured Paul Scofield and was first broadcast on Radio 3 in 1998, was lauded as "the greatest radio drama [anyone] could ever hear."

== Radio Plays ==
Radio Plays Directed or Produced by Jeremy Mortimer
Date first broadcast	Play	Author	Cast	Synopsis Awards	Station Series
19 September 1990 (Recorded on 18 April 1990)	Something Happened	Mike Walker	Ben Onwukwe, Diana Bishop, Jonathan Firth, Mmoloki Chrystie, Kelda Holmes, Lizzie McInnerny and Trevor Nicholls	How does a family recover from the kidnapping of a child, and how does the child cope?	BBC Radio 4
6 April 1995	Charley Tango	David Lan	Jade Buckland, Danielle Fraser Boam, Ndumiso Mvula, Yvonne Scicluna, Desmond Taylor, David Antrobus, David Calder, Rowena Cooper, Louis Mahoney, T-Bone Wilson, Colin McFarlane, Joan-Anne Maynard, Ewen Cummins, Cyril Nri, Claire Benedict and Otis Munyang 'Iri	Richard rides as photographer on convoy trucks returning African children to their families. Months later his photographs shatter the peace of an ordinary summer afternoon.	BBC Radio 4 Afternoon Play
4 June 1999	Tiananmen Square	Paul Godfrey	David K S Tse and Jennifer Lim	In June 1989 thousands of students gathered in Tiananmen Square demanding change. In this drama, citizens of Beijing add their support as the students stage a hunger strike. Unless the students agree to evacuate the square, the military will be drafted in. On 4 June 1989, time runs out for the students.	BBC Radio 4 Friday Play
25 October 1999 – 3 December 1999	Nicholas Nickleby (Note: Directed by Marilyn Imrie and Jeremy Mortimer)	Charles Dickens dramatised by Mike Walker and Georgia Pritchett	Oliver Milburn, Alex Jennings, Nicola Radcliffe, Ken Campbell, Anna Massey, Richard Johnson, Tom Baker and David Bamber	The story is of Nicholas's triumph against adversity: he defeats his wicked Uncle Ralph and the loathsome Squeers in order to carve out a life for himself, his family and the pitiful boy, Smike. Eventually he wins the hand of a beautiful girl, Madeline Bray.	BBC Radio 4 Woman's Hour Drama
14 January 2002	Philomel Cottage	Agatha Christie updated and dramatised by Mike Walker	Lizzie McInnerny, Tom Hollander, Adam Godley and Struan Rodger	When Alex meets Terry she is swept off her feet. He persuades her to leave her job and set up a business with him.	BBC Radio 4
17 March 2003	The Case of the Perfect Carer retitled from The Case of the Perfect Maid	Agatha Christie dramatised by Mike Walker	Richenda Carey, Joanna Monro, Carla Simpson, Richard Firth and Joan O'Norman (Note: Joan O'Norman was included in the cast credits but is an anagram of Joanna Monro used to conceal one "character" being a disguise)	Renting a flat to elderly sisters in a converted dower house should be a simple job for an estate agent, but Kate finds Bernice anything but easy. Then valuables start to disappear.	BBC Radio 4
5 December 2005 – 30 December 2005	David Copperfield (Note: Directed by Jeremy Mortimer and Mary Peate)	Charles Dickens adapted by Mike Walker	Robert Glenister, Michael Legge, Gerard McDermott, Deborah Findlay, Colleen Prendergast, Susan Jameson, Amy Marston, Harry Myers, Paul Bradley, Richard Firth, Geoffrey Whitehead, Adrian Scarborough, Shaun Dingwall, Diana Quick, Eve Best, Emily Wachter, Flaminia Cinque, Nicholas Le Prevost, Alex Tregear, Carl Prekopp, Geoffrey Streatfield, Joanne Froggatt, Helen Longworth, Selina Griffith and Steven Williams	A new dramatisation of the semi-autobiographical novel which Dickens called "his favourite child".	BBC Radio 4 Woman's Hour Drama
23 November 2008	The Pattern of Painful Adventures	Stephen Wakelam	Antony Sher, Will Keen, Stephen Critchlow, Chris Pavlo, Helen Longworth, John Rowe, Robert Lonsdale and Joseph Kloska	It is 1607 and Shakespeare's life is at a turning point. Business is going well, but the playwright urgently needs a collaborator for his latest play. His daughter is getting married. His brother has a sick child and is in need of a job.	BBC Radio 3 Drama on 3
22 February 2009	The Time Machine	H. G. Wells dramatised by Philip Osment; Music by John Nicholls	Robert Glenister, William Gaunt, Gunnar Cauthery, Donnla Hughes, Stephen Critchlow, Chris Pavlo, Manjeet Mann, Jill Cardo, Robert Lonsdale, Inam Mirza and Dan Starkey	H. G. Wells' classic story of a time-traveller's journey to the future, where mankind has diverged into two species – the Eloi and the Morlocks.	BBC Radio 3 Drama on 3
26 December 2011 – 30 December 2011	A Tale of Two Cities (Note: Directed by Jessica Dromgoole and Jeremy Mortimer)	Charles Dickens dramatised in five parts by Mike Walker; Music by Lennert Busch	Robert Lindsay, Jonathan Coy, Alison Steadman, Karl Johnson, Lydia Wilson, Andrew Scott, Paul Ready, James Lailey, Tracy Wiles, Simon Bubb, Carl Prekopp, Adjoa Andoh, Daniel Cooper, Clive Merrison, Gerard McDermott, Paul Moriarty, Christopher Webster, Adam Billington, Rikki Lawton and Alex Rivers	In London and Paris before and during the French Revolution, these five episodes show the plight of the French people under the brutal oppression of the aristocracy in the years leading up to the revolution, and the corresponding savage brutality of the revolutionaries toward the former aristocrats in the years immediately following. Won the Bronze Sony Radio Academy Award for Best Drama in 2012.	BBC Radio 4 Afternoon Play
25 November 2012 – 17 December 2012	The Count of Monte Cristo (Note: Directed by Jeremy Mortimer and Sasha Yevtushenko)	Alexandre Dumas dramatized in four parts by Sebastian Baczkiewicz; Music by David Tobin and Jeff Meegan	Iain Glen, Jane Lapotaire, Paul Rhys, Toby Jones, Josette Simon, Richard Johnson, Zubin Varla, Robert Blythe, Amber Rose Revah, Kate Fleetwood, Stephanie Racine, Will Howard and Adam Nagaitis	It is 1838. The Count of Monte Cristo has arrived in Paris. Baron Danglars, Gerard de Villefort and Fernand de Morcerf have no idea that Edmond Dantes, who they betrayed in Marseilles a quarter of a century earlier, is plotting to destroy them.	BBC Radio 4 Classic Serial
2017	Deep Time Walk	Peter Oswald and Stephan Harding	Chipo Chung, Paul Hilton, Peter Marinker	A Scientist is lost, alone, somewhere in the distant present. She feels she has run out of answers, her way of working and her kind of knowledge, misused by the world, seems to destroy all it touches. Someone approaches her – a Fool, escaped out of a Shakespeare play perhaps, a holy joker. He offers to walk with her from the formation of the Earth to the present, to see if they can find anything out that will change things. They take one great step back and then start walking forwards, from the clumping together of the material of the Earth, through the long ages of the evolution of bacteria. As they go, the Scientist explains to the Fool the scientific meaning of the wonders he is seeing. Best Mobile App award, Script nominated for Ted Hughes Award.	N/A

Notes:

Sources:

- Jeremy Mortimer's radio play listing at Diversity website
- Jeremy Mortimer's radio play listing at RadioListings website
