= Gorse Hall =

Coordinates: 53°28′34″N 2°03′25″W

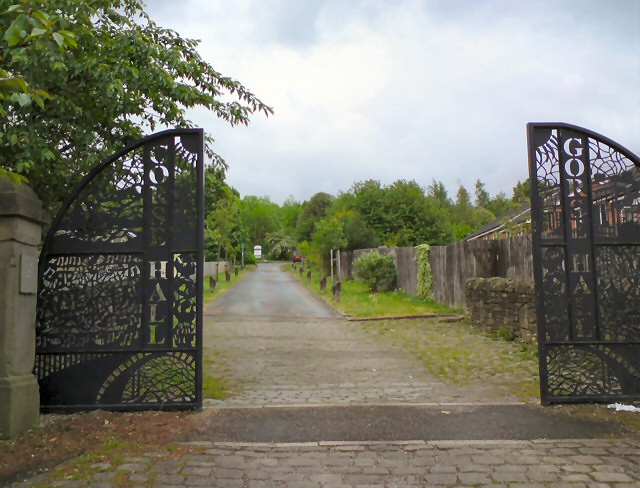
Entrance to Gorse Hall, High St, Stalybridge

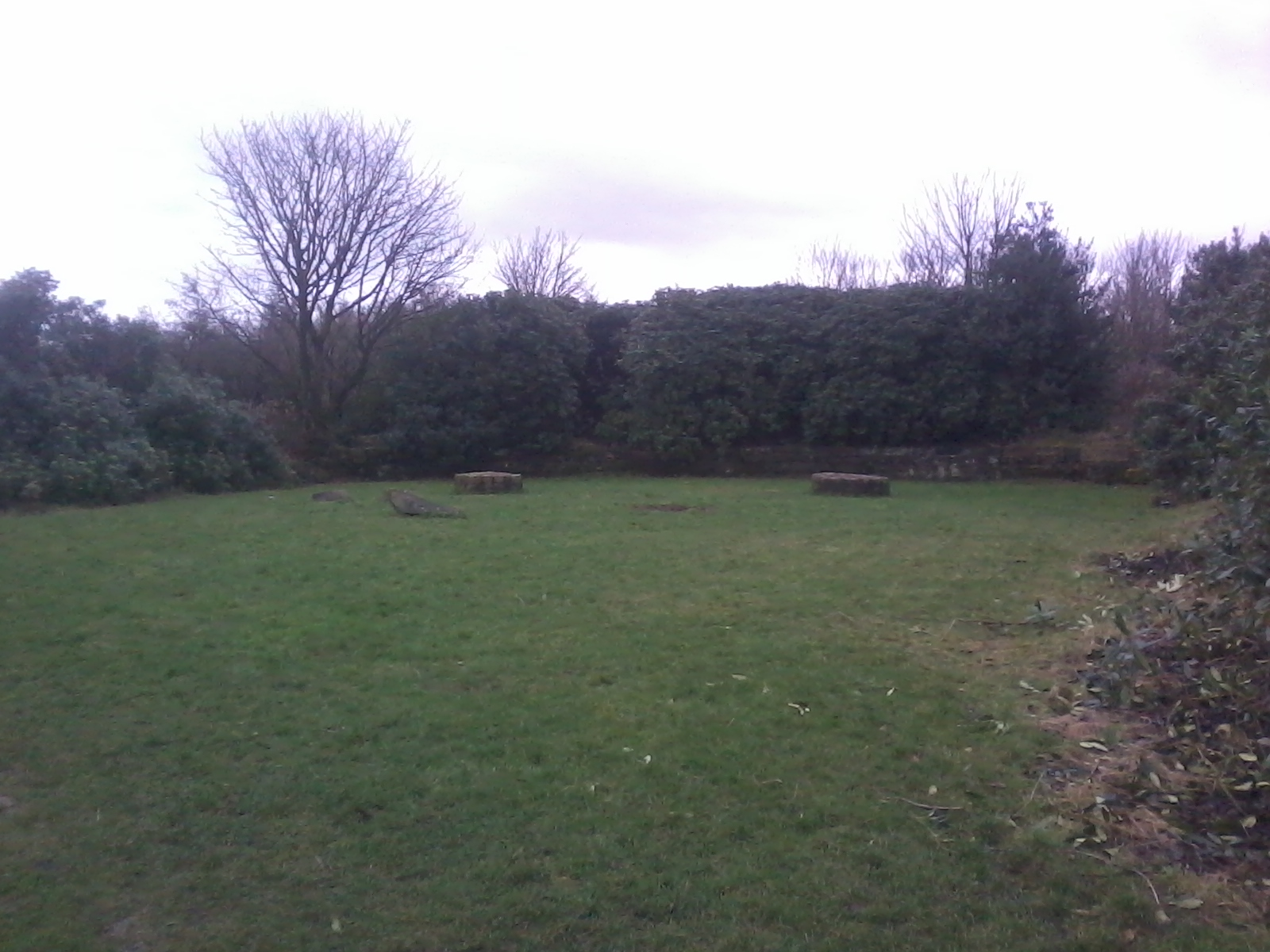
Bowling Green, Gorse Hall Estate

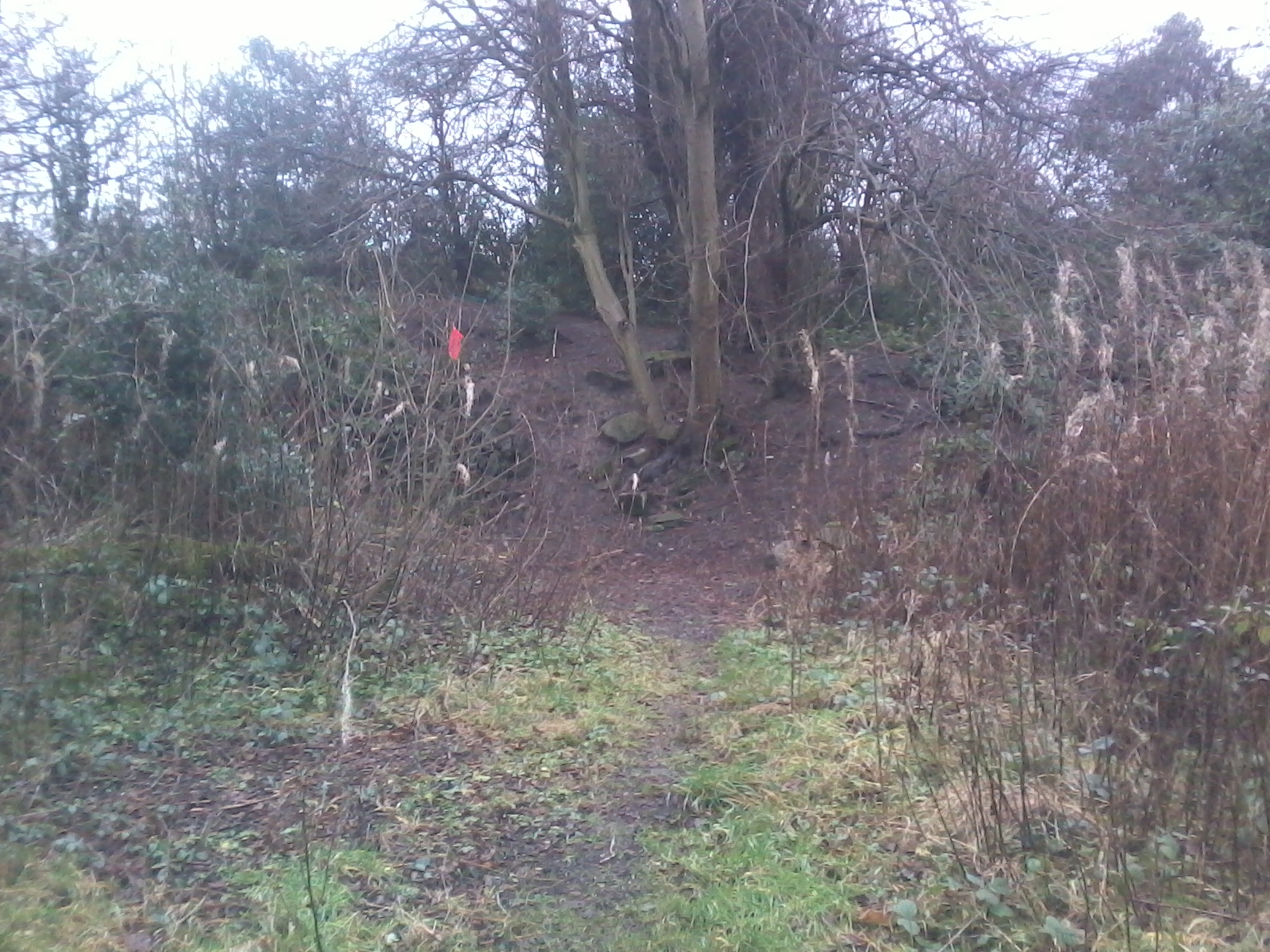
Summer House site, Gorse Hall Estate

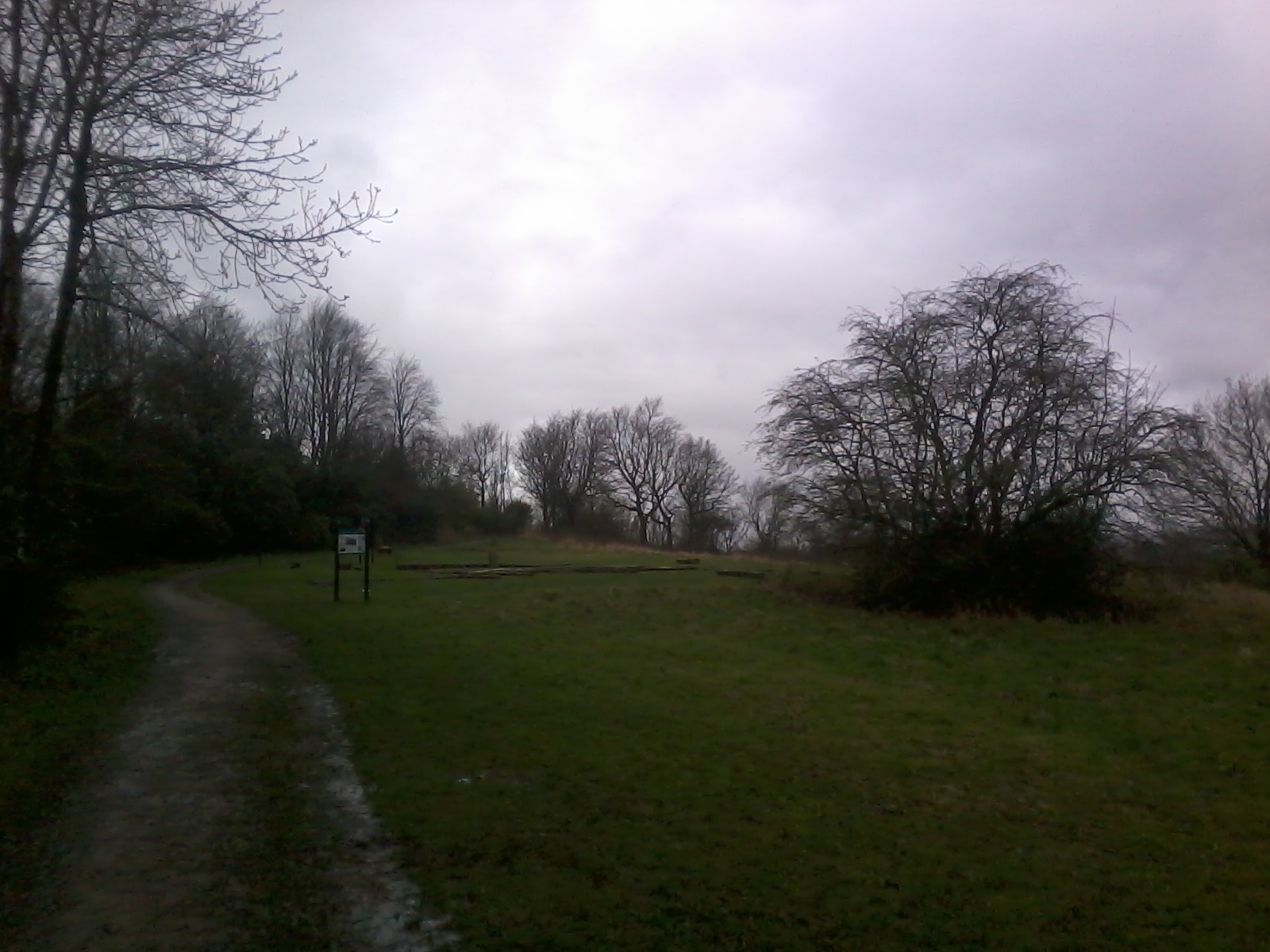
Approach to Gorse Hall Mansion

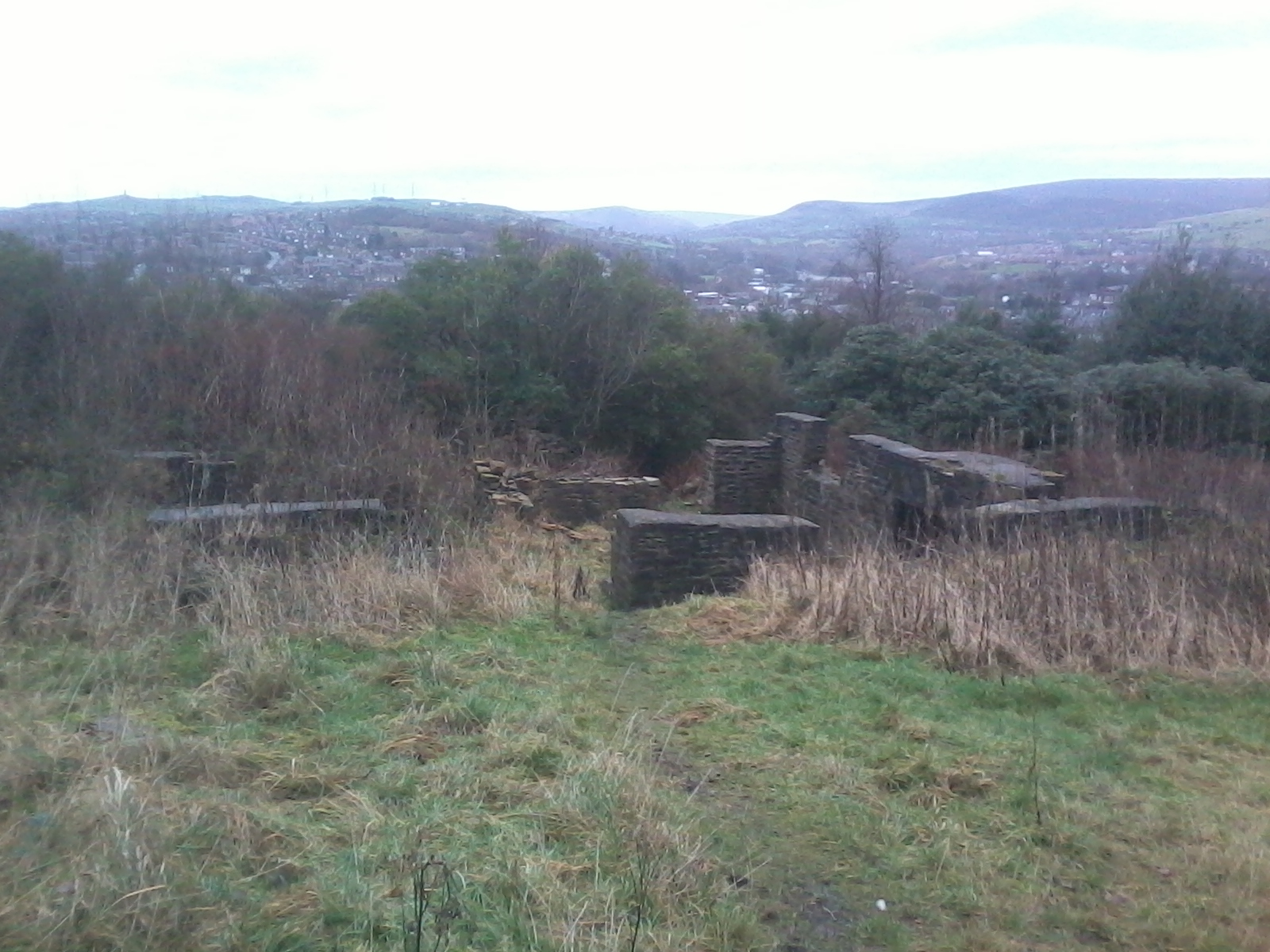
Old Gorse Hall site, Gorse Hall Estate

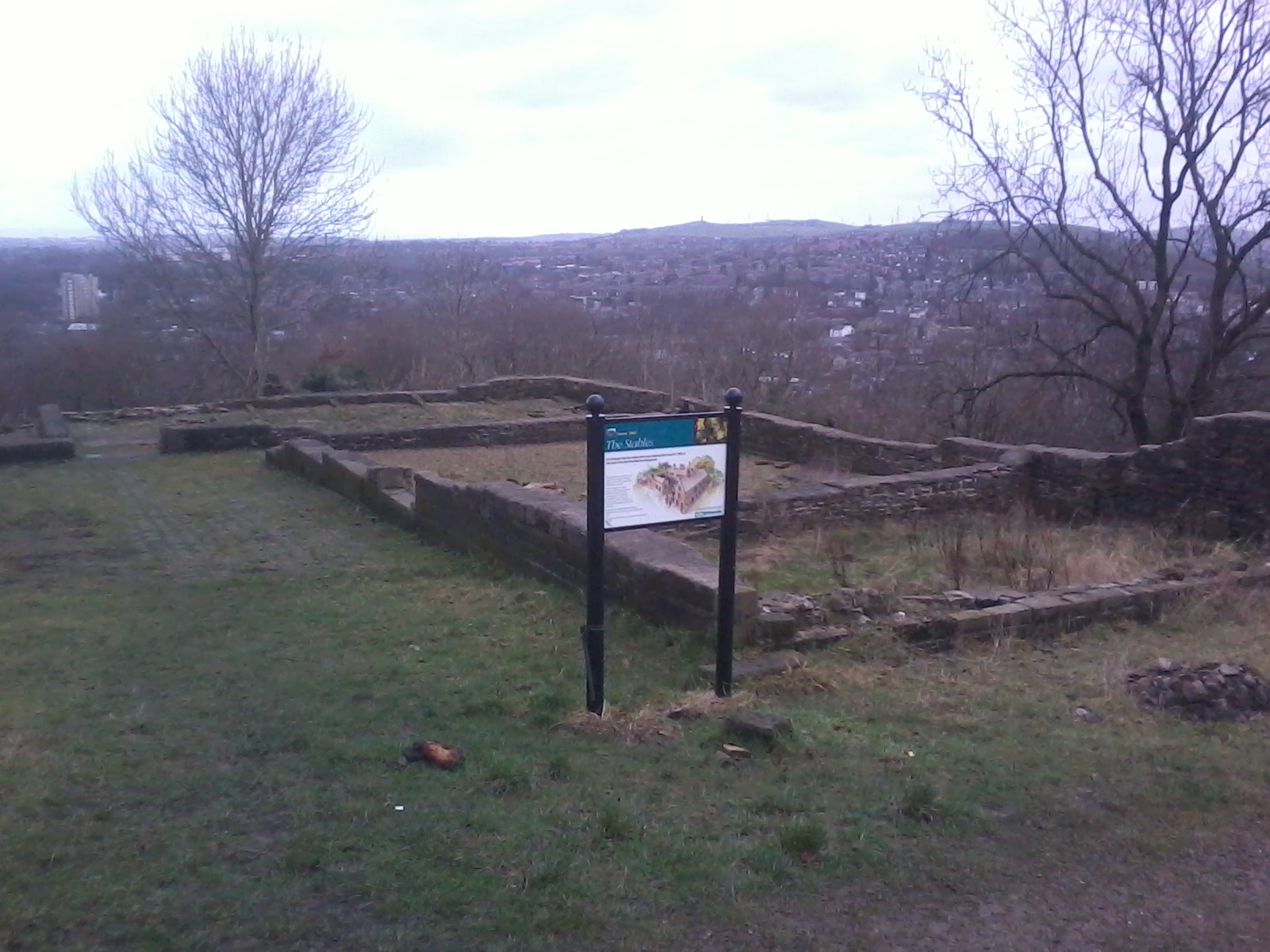
Stables site, Gorse Hall Estate

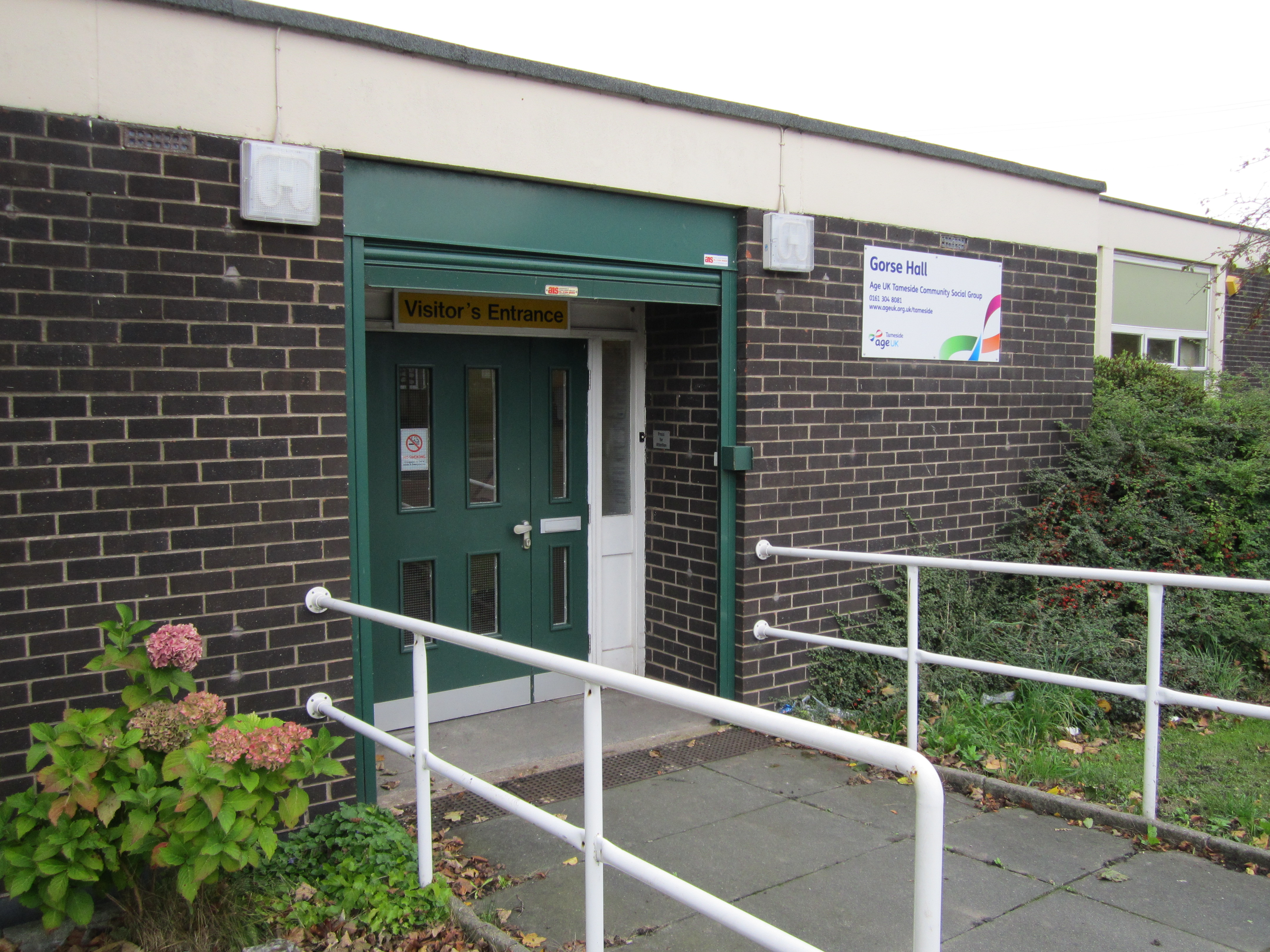
Former Age UK Site, "Gorse Hall", Stalybridge, October 2013, now a private day nursery

Gorse Hall was the name given to two large houses in Stalybridge, Greater Manchester, England, on a hill bordering Dukinfield (now in Tameside, but until March 1974 in Cheshire), with 35 acres of woodland, and views of the Cheshire Plain and the Pennine Hills. Gorse Hall is a location in Anthony Trollope's Marion Fay (1882).

== History ==
Tradition has, it was named for the abundance of common gorse (Ulex europaeus) which formerly grew in the area.

The history of the place is not well known. Friends of Gorse Hall is trying to research the historical importance of the site.

=== Old Gorse Hall ===
The first house, Old Gorse Hall, can be traced back to the 17th century and it probably dates from even earlier. Its ruins can still be seen. The Hall was once part of the manor of Dockenfeld held by Lieutenant–Colonel Robert Duckenfield, a Parliamentarian soldier in the English Civil War.

Upon the death of Lady Dukinfield Daniel in 1762, Gorse Hall passed on to her husband, artist John Astley (1720?–1787). From him it passed to his relative Francis Dukinfield Astley, a great sportsman; a hunter's tower was built in 1807.

=== New Gorse Hall ===
John Leech, who was one of the many wealthy cotton manufacturers of the district, bought some of the land attached to the Hall from John Astley to build his mills, the ruins of which can still be seen.

New Gorse Hall was built by John Leech in 1836. Today, both houses are ruined. Their grounds cover approximately 35 acres (140,000 m^{2}) of meadow and woodland and are now maintained by a local community group called the Friends of Gorse Hall, established in 1999, which has leased the site from the local authority, Tameside. The aim of the Friends of Gorse Hall is to promote the site for leisure, and educational uses.

Leech's son John, bought the remainder of the estate and with stones from the local quarries built the mansion called the New Gorse Hall in 1836. John had eight children, one of whom, Helen Leech, born at Gorse Hall, was the mother of Beatrix Potter, the famous children’s author. In reference to this, there is a statue in the grounds of a small Rabbit.

"Beatrix Potter would often write and draw while visiting her family at Gorse Hall"

== Murder ==
On 1 November 1909, Gorse Hall was the site of a murder when local mill owner George Harry Storrs was stabbed to death. Two "identical" ex-soldiers, Cornelius Howard, a relative, and Mark Wilde, were tried, with the same defence counsel, but neither resulted in a conviction. A year after the murder, In the summer of 1910, his widow, Mrs. Maggie Storrs had Gorse Hall torn down, with the stone reused elsewhere, she moved away, to Morecambe Bay, never to return.

The case is examined in The Stabbing of George Harry Storrs by Jonathan Goodman. and featured in an episode of the television series In Suspicious Circumstances, in 1995, and Julian Fellowes Investigates: A Most Mysterious Murder, in 2005.

== Present day ==
All that remains at this site is an old fireplace, standing alone in a concrete clearing, and floor foundations, painted a mixture of green, blue and red to show the outline of the home and where the disaster happened. Friends of Gorse Hall manage the grounds.

== Disambiguation ==
- Gorse Hall Primary School, Forester Drive, Stalybridge (across from former Age UK Site).
- Gorse Hall, on the old Chorley to Blackburn road, Whittle-le-Woods
- Gorse Hall Rock, Lancashire geological feature
