= Murder of George Harry Storrs =

1909 murder in Stalybridge, England

George Harry Storrs
- Born: Stalybridge, Cheshire, England
- Died: November 1, 1909; Stalybridge, Cheshire, England
- Cause of death: Stabbing
- Known for: Victim of unsolved murder

The murder of George Harry Storrs occurred on 1 November 1909 in Stalybridge, Cheshire, England. Despite two trials, no one was convicted of the crime.

Storrs had been receiving anonymous threatening letters following the suicide of his former lover. He was placed under police protection but was found stabbed to death within his residence. There were at least six known suspects in the murder, but no motive for the murder could be established. The description of an unnamed suspect seen by Storrs' cook did not match either of the two men who were placed on trial.

In 2010, a historian connected this murder to the murder of Hannah Etchells, which took place months after Storrs' murder.

== Background ==
George was the third son of William Storrs, a very successful builder in Stalybridge, Cheshire. George inherited control of William's business. George lived at Gorse Hall in Stalybridge, with his wife, Maggie (née Middleton). They had married when he was 30 and she was 35. To the public, the marriage appeared loveless and childless, unlike that of George's older brother James, and it is possible that this was a cause of friction between the two brothers. However, there was solid evidence of Maggie and George sharing a deep love for each other, as witnessed by their niece, Marion Lindley.

Another brother William Henry had died in 1903. Cornelius Howard, a cousin of George Harry Storrs, was originally a petty thief but joined the British Army and rose to the rank of Bombardier. Cornelius was not liked by George. When Cornelius approached George for a position in the company, George refused.

== Extramarital affair ==
George's friend Robert Innes, a local solicitor, employed a governess for his children and George allegedly began a relationship with the young woman, Maria Hohl. Maria suddenly decided to leave Stalybridge, purportedly to attend Oxford University. She then returned, equally as suddenly, some eight months later but did not see George again. Goodman wrote that Maria gave birth to a child during her absence from Stalybridge. After her return to Stalybridge, Maria Hohl committed suicide by drowning herself in a canal.

Robert Innes was a distant relation to George Harry Storrs through marriage. Robert Innes' first wife was Eliza Storrs and they had a daughter Eliza Storrs Innes. Eliza's father, John Storrs, was involved in the management of Taylor, Lang & Co the major textile engineering company in the town. He and his cousin William, George Harry's father, lived next door to each other in Mottram Road, Stalybridge.

== Threats preceding the murder ==
After Maria's death, George started receiving anonymous threatening letters. Following her death, he may have felt that he had a debt to pay, and thus feared a reason that he could be killed. This meant he could only really confide in his faithful servant, James Worrell.

Shortly afterwards, Gorse Hall was attacked twice. The first attack, according to author Jonathan Goodman, was staged (Goodman called it a burlesque), so that the police would take the threats seriously. A gun barrel was thrust through a window. This was probably done by Worrell. The attack made the police start patrols of the ground and a bell was installed to summon help in times of danger. George tested the bell, causing a lot of goodwill for George to evaporate.

== Murder ==
The second attack, on the evening of 1 November 1909, was the fatal one. After "testing" the bell, George was not told by the police that they were protecting election buildings. At the time, there were preparations for the January 1910 general election.

This preoccupation of the police meant that help only arrived as he was dying. Maggie Storrs rang the bell for the second attack and refused to attend her husband's side as he lay dying. Her refusal was speculated to be her possible avoidance of hearing a confession of infidelity from her dying husband. Despite this, Maggie was very visibly shaken by her husband's murder and was reported to faint on several occasions.

Witnesses reported seeing an intruder with a gun, but Storrs was stabbed to death, with 15 stabs being noted on his body.

== Trials ==
There were two trials: the first for George's cousin, Cornelius Howard, and the second for another local man, Mark Wilde. Wilde was brought to the attention of investigators after he had attacked a young courting couple. Both Howard and Wilde were defended by barrister Edward Theophilus Nelson, a British Guianan who had graduated from St John's College, Oxford, in 1902. Both men were acquitted.

== Worrell's suicide ==
James Worrell committed suicide by hanging shortly after the burial of his employer.

== Suspects ==
The two trials both resulted in acquittals and nobody was definitely proven to be the murderer. However, there are quite a few suspects. The case is examined in The Stabbing of George Harry Storrs by Jonathan Goodman, and featured in an episode of the television series In Suspicious Circumstances in 1995 and Julian Fellowes Investigates: A Most Mysterious Murder in 2005.

- James Worrell worked with knives and guns, but had no reason to murder his employer.
- Some people felt that James Storrs and/or Maggie Storrs hired a hitman. While James had no real motive, Maggie probably did know about Maria's baby.
- Cornelius had no alibi, but again, had no real reason.
- Mark Wilde had a compelling case against him, even though his mother had given an alibi for him. He suffered from mood swings, possibly caused by syphilis. He and George were enemies and he did have a conviction for a violent offence.
- Julian Fellowes believes that the younger brother of Maria Hohl, John Gottfried Hohl, was the killer, and did it for revenge. This possibility was outlined by Goodman in 1983.

A year after the murder, Mrs Storrs had Gorse Hall torn down.

== Modern day ==
In November 2009, the Friends of Gorse Hall, in conjunction with 2 Boards & A Passion Theatre Company, staged a walk through the town which culminated at the site of Gorse Hall. On the way, they stopped at the pub where James Worrell was drinking, and the theatre company performed scenes whilst in period dress.

In April 2010, local historian Barry Sullivan stated that he believed the murderer was a travelling carter named Alfred Derrick. Derrick had been convicted of killing his lover, Hannah Etchells, for which he was sentenced to life in prison. This murder occurred just a few months after the Storrs murder, and it is theorised that Derrick confessed to Etchells and then murdered her when he thought she was going to go to the police. Derrick's description seems to fit that given by the cook on the night of the Storrs murder, something that does not apply to Cornelius Howard or Mark Wilde.

== See also ==
- List of unsolved murders in the United Kingdom (before 1970)
