= List of Carleton Hobbs Bursary winners =

List of Carlton Hobbs Bursary winners, awarded by the BBC Drama Company

This is a List of the Carleton Hobbs Bursary winners, who thus gained a six-month contract with the BBC's Radio Drama Company.

Until 1997, two Bursaries were awarded each year; in 1998, the number increased to six; in 2003, it fell back to five, and in 2004, to four.

== Winners ==
- 1953: Catherine Fleming
- 1954: Mary Ure (declined), Edward Kelsey, Aline Waite
- 1955: Geoffrey Hodson, Annette Kelly
- 1956: Rowena Cooper, Patrick Godfrey
- 1957: Anne Rye, Charles Kay
- 1958: Eva Gaddon, Jeremy Kemp
- 1959: Tobi Weinburgh, Derek Smith
- 1960: Nerys Hughes, Gareth Morgan
- 1961: Patricia Bendall, Stanley Lebor
- 1962: Sian Davies, David Valla
- 1963: Petronella Barker, Bruce Condell
- 1964: Leroy Lingwood, Rosalind Shanks
- 1965: Patricia Gallimore, Anthony Jackson
- 1966: Carole Boyd, Clive Merrison
- 1967: Alexandra Romanes, Michael Harbor
- 1968: Margaret Gouriet, Desmond McNamara
- 1969: Deborah Dallas, Geoffrey Collins
- 1970s: Susan Coward, David Timson, Gail McFarlane, Elizabeth Revill, Madeline Cemm, Ginette Clarke, Terri Lang, Mary Nelson, Alison Draper, Elizabeth Rider, Richard Griffiths, Andrew Rivers, Anthony Daniels, David Ericson, Andrew Seear, Tim Bentinck, Trevor Cooper
- 1980s: Kathryn Hurlbutt, Stella Forge, Alexandra Mathie, Eileen Tully, Jenny Funnell, Jane Leonard, Karen Ascoe, Victoria Carling, Cara Kelly, Jane Slavin, John McAndrew, Gary Cady, Simon Hewitt, Scott Cherry, Guy Holden, James McPherson, James Good, Stephen Tompkinson, Dominic Rickhards, Charles Simpson
- 1990s: Cathy Sara, Annabel Mullion, Tracy Wiles, Amanda Gordon, Sarah Rice, Angus Wright, Robert Portal, Julian Rhind-Tutt, Nicholas Boulton, David Antrobus, Paul Jenkins, Mark Bonnar, Alistair Danson, Elizabeth Conboy, Priyanga Elan, Tilly Gaunt, Giles Fagan, Ben Crowe, Harry Myers, Fiona Clarke, Beth Chalmers, Gemma Saunders, Tom George, Christopher Kelham, Tim Treloar
- 2000: Helen Ayres, Clare Corbett, Jasmine Hyde, Thomas Arnold, Kenny Blyth, Simon (Alex) Trinder
- 2001: Helen Longworth, Sarah Paul, Jonathan Forbes, Carl Prekopp, Peter Darney
- 2002: Carla Simpson, Laura Doddington, Emma Callender, Scott Brooksbank, Simon Donaldson, Richard Wright-Firth
- 2003: Jaimi Barbakoff, Gbemisola Ikumelo, Lydia Leonard, Damian Lynch, Chris Moran
- 2004: Emily Wachter, Alex Tregear, Rob Hastie, Stuart McLoughlin
- 2005: Ella Smith, Sophie Roberts, John Cummins, Nick Sayce
- 2006: Bethan Walker, Emma Noakes, Joseph Kloska, Paul Richard Biggin
- 2007: Joannah Tincey, Laura Molyneux, Alex Lanipekun, Sam Pamphilon
- 2008: Donnla Hughes, Jill Cardo, Gunnar Cauthery, Robert Lonsdale
- 2009: Melissa Advani, Emerald O'Hanrahan, Rhys Jennings, Piers Wehner, Joseph Cohen-Cole
- 2010: Leah Brotherhead, Claire Harry, Iain Batchelor, Henry Devas
- 2011: Alex Rivers, Francine Chamberlain, Adam Billington, Rikki Lawton
- 2012: Eleanor Crooks, Stephanie Racine, Will Howard, Adam Nagaitis
- 2013: Georgie Fuller, Arthur Hughes, Harry Jardine, Joel Maccormac
- 2014: Hannah Genesius, Roslyn Hill, Monty D'Inverno, Paul Heath
- 2015: Evie Killip, Caolan McCarthy, Rebecca Hamilton, George Watkins
- 2016: Natasha Cowley, Keziah Joseph, Catriona McFarlane, Luke MacGregor
- 2017: Abbie Andrews, Isabella Inchbald, Adam Fitzgerald, Gary Duncan, Tayla Kovacevic-Ebong
- 2018: Alexandra Constantinidi, Liam Lau Fernandez, Lucy Doyle, Cameron Percival, Saffron Coomber
- 2019: Laura Christy, Greg Jones, Lucy Reynolds, Will Kirk, Scarlett Courtney
- 2020: Cecilia Appiah, Ian Dunnett Jnr, Charlotte East, Luke Nunn
- 2021: Grace Cooper Milton, Justice Ritchie
- 2022: Chloë Sommer,Tom Kiteley, Hughie O'Donnell
- 2023: Kitty O'Sullivan, Josh Bryant-Jones, Tyler Cameron
- 2024: Andi Bickers, Nuhazet Diaz Cano, Shreya Lallu
