= Bleasdale (surname) =

Bleasdale is an English toponymic surname. Notable people with this name include:

- Alan Bleasdale (born 1946), English screenwriter
- Gary Bleasdale
- Holly Bleasdale
- Ian Bleasdale
- John Bleasdale
- Julia Bleasdale
- Marcus Bleasdale
- Steve Bleasdale
- Tony Bleasdale
