= Jane Lapotaire =

English actress (1944–2026)

Jane Lapotaire CBE
- Born: Jane Elizabeth Marie Burgess; 26 December 1944; Ipswich, Suffolk, England
- Died: 5 March 2026 (aged 81); Bournemouth, Dorset, England
- Occupation: Actress
- Years active: 1965–2026
- Spouses: Oliver Wood (m. 1965; div. 1967); Roland Joffé (m. 1974; div. 1980)
- Children: Rowan Joffé

Jane Elizabeth Marie Lapotaire (née Burgess; 26 December 1944 – 5 March 2026) was an English actress from Suffolk.

Her performance in the title role of Marie Curie (1977) first brought her to wide attention. In 1978, she performed the title role Édith Piaf for Pam Gems's play Piaf for the Royal Shakespeare Company in Stratford-upon-Avon and in London. Two years later, the show moved to Broadway where Lapotaire won the Tony Award for Best Actress in a Play. In 2013, she played the Duchess of Gloucester in Richard II with David Tennant in the title role. This was followed in 2015 by a role as Queen Isobel in Henry V. Lapotaire won the Laurence Olivier Award for Actress of the Year in a New Play for Piaf in 1979 and was nominated for the Actress of the Year Award in 1990 for Shadowlands. Additionally, Lapotaire was twice nominated for the British Academy Television Award for Best Actress for Marie Curie and Sea Tales: The Return (1977) and Blind Justice (1988).

Lapotaire also wrote three memoirs. Lapotaire was married twice, latterly to director Roland Joffé. Their son is the screenwriter and director Rowan Joffé.

== Early life ==
Lapotaire was born in Ipswich, Suffolk, on 26 December 1944. Her mother, Louise Burgess, was French but had been abandoned as a baby in England and brought up in foster care in Ipswich. She was nineteen and single when Lapotaire was born, and never revealed the identity of her daughter's father. From the age of two months, Lapotaire was raised as a foster child by a widowed pensioner, Grace Chisnall, who had also been her birth mother's foster mother. It was a working-class, impoverished childhood, but, when Lapotaire won a place at the local grammar school, Northgate Grammar School, her horizons were broadened with an introduction to art, music and literature. When Lapotaire was about 12, her birth mother made a bid to reclaim her, but she chose to remain with her foster mother in Ipswich, although she spent holidays with Burgess, by then married to a Canadian oil worker and living in North Africa. She later took her birth mother's married name, Lapotaire. Grace Chisnall died in 1984 aged 96 and Louise Lapotaire died in 1999.

== Acting career ==
Lapotaire studied at the Bristol Old Vic Theatre School from 1961 to 1963. At that time, the programme was a two-year course, unlike today's three-year course. Lapotaire had earlier auditioned for the Royal Academy of Dramatic Art (RADA) in London, but failed to get in. She joined the Bristol Old Vic theatre company in 1965 and the National Theatre in 1967. She was also a founding member of The Young Vic Theatre in 1970/1971 and moved to the Royal Shakespeare Company in 1974.

Her performance in the title role of Marie Curie (1977) first brought her to wide attention. In 1978, she performed the title role Édith Piaf for Pam Gems's play Piaf, directed by Howard Davies for the Royal Shakespeare Company, in Stratford-upon-Avon and in London at the Warehouse Theatre, Covent Garden in 1979. Two years later, the show moved to Broadway. Lapotaire won the Tony Award for Best Actress in a Play that year.

She returned to the Royal Shakespeare Company in October–November 2013 as the Duchess of Gloucester in Gregory Doran's adaptation of Richard II with David Tennant in the title role. This was followed in October–December 2015 as Queen Isobel in Henry V. On Christmas Day in 2014, she appeared as Princess Irina Kuragin in season five, episode nine of Downton Abbey.

== Writing ==
Lapotaire wrote a number of memoirs: Grace and Favour (1989), Out of Order: A Haphazard Journey Through One Woman's Year (1999), and Everybody's Daughter, Nobody's Child (2007), which includes an account of her childhood growing up in Levington Road, Ipswich.

== Personal life and death ==
Lapotaire was married to Oliver Wood from 1965 to 1967, the relationship ending in divorce. She was then married to director Roland Joffé from 1974 to 1980, with whom she had a son, screenwriter and director Rowan Joffé (born 1973). Following their divorce, she was for a time the partner of actor Michael Pennington.

On 11 January 2000, while preparing to teach a course on Shakespeare at the École Internationale in Paris, Lapotaire suffered a massive cerebral haemorrhage. Four days after her collapse, she underwent a six-hour operation and spent the next three weeks largely unconscious. She wrote about her recovery in Time Out of Mind.

Lapotaire died on 5 March 2026, at the age of 81.

== Associations ==
Lapotaire was honorary president of the Bristol Old Vic Theatre Club, and was president of the Friends of Shakespeare's Globe.

== Filmography ==
Film
Year	Title	Role
1970	Crescendo	Lillianne
1972	Antony and Cleopatra	Charmian
1973	The Asphyx	Christina Cunningham
1975	One of Our Dinosaurs Is Missing	Miss Prescott
1983	Eureka	Helen McCann
1984	To Catch a King	Irene Neumann
1986	Lady Jane	Princess/Queen Mary
1996	Surviving Picasso	Olga Picasso
1997	Shooting Fish	Dylan's Headmistress
2000	There's Only One Jimmy Grimble	Alice Brewer
2005	Can't Stop Breathing	Daisy (short movie)
2016	The Young Messiah	Sarah
2020	Rebecca	Granny
2021	Smyrna	Filio Mpaltatzi

Television
Year	Title	Role	Notes
1968	Sherlock Holmes	Annie Harrison	Episode: "The Naval Treaty"
1971	Jason King	French maid	Episode: "Buried in the Cold, Cold Ground"
1971	The Rivals of Sherlock Holmes	Emily Shaw	Episode: "The Case of Laker, Absconded
1972	Play for Today	Alice Stocker	Episode: "Stocker's Copper"
1972	Owen, M.D.	Jennie Hopkins	Episode: "It Never Rains" (2 parts)
1972	Callan	Kristina	Episode: "The Contract"
1972	Love and Mr Lewisham	Miss Alice Heydinger	Mini-series
1972	Armchair Theatre	Jean	Episode: "On Call"
1972	The Edwardians	Alice Hoatson	Episode: "E. Nesbit"
1973	Van der Valk	Elly	Episode: "Rich Man, Poor Man"
1973	Country Matters	Orianda	Episode: "The Black Dog" (S2E02)
1973	Crown Court	Juliet Tomlin	Episode: "Robin and his Juliet"
1975	Edward the Seventh	Empress Marie of Russia	
1976	Play for Today	Kim	Episode: "The Other Woman"
1976	The House of Bernarda Alba	Magdalena	
1977	Sea Tales	Narrator; Bridget Ritsin	Episode: "The Return"
1977	Marie Curie	Marie Curie	
1978	Wings	Anne Boissier	Episode: "Another Country"
1978	The Devil's Crown	Eleanor of Aquitaine	
1979	Jackanory	Storyteller	Episode: "Fanny's Sister"
1981	Antony & Cleopatra	Cleopatra	TV film (BBC Television Shakespeare)
1982	The Barretts of Wimpole Street	Elizabeth Moulton-Barrett	
1983	The Captain's Doll	Evangeline	
1983	Macbeth	Lady Macbeth	TV film
1984	The Testament of John	Claire	
1985	Seal Morning	Miriam Spencer	
1987	Napoleon and Josephine: A Love Story	Letizia Bonaparte	
1988	Theatre Night	Aline Solness	Episode: "The Master Builder"
1988	Blind Justice	Katherine Hughes	Episodes: "Crime and Punishment", "White Man Listen", "The One about the Irishman", "A Death in the Family", "Permanent Blue"
1989	The Dark Angel	Madame de la Rougierre	
1989	Murder on the Moon	Louise Mackey	TV film
1990	Screen Two	Helen	Episode: "Circles of Deceit"
1992‍–‍93	Love Hurts	Diane Warburg	(Series 1–2, 20 episodes)
1994	The Inspector Alleyn Mysteries	Elspeth Cost	Episode: "Dead Water"
1995	Johnny and the Dead	Mrs. Sylvia Liberty	
1996	Casualty	Eileen Jarvis	Episode: "We Shall Overcome"
1996	The Ruth Rendell Mysteries	Anouk Khoori	Episode: "Simisola"
1996	Giving Tongue	Hilda Jacob	
1997	McCallum	Miriam Konrad	Episode: "Sacrifice"
1997	Ain't Misbehavin'	Clara Van Trapp	
2000	Arabian Nights	Miriam	TV film
2001	Midsomer Murders	Mary Mohan	Episode: "Who Killed Cock Robin?"
2004	Bella and the Boys	Mrs. Rogers	TV film
2004	He Knew He Was Right	Lady Milborough	
2005	The Inspector Lynley Mysteries	Fiona Deakin-Jones	Episode: "Word of God"
2006	Elizabeth David – a Life in Recipes	Ernestine Carter	
2006	Eleventh Hour	Gepetto	Episode: "Resurrection"
2009	Casualty	Maureen	Episodes: "Crush" and "Better Drowned"
2009	Trial & Retribution	Tess	Episode: "Ghost Train (Part 1)"
2013	Lucan	Older Susie Maxwell-Scott	Episode: 1
2014	Downton Abbey	Princess Kuragin	Episode: "A Moorland Holiday"
2019	The Crown	Princess Alice of Battenberg	2 episodes
2021	Dalgliesh	Lady Lavinia Berowne	Episode: "A Taste for Death"
2023	Endeavour	Madame Belasco	Episode: "Prelude"
2023	The Burning Girls	Joan Hartman	Main role

== Theatre ==
Her stage credits include:

Date	Title	Role	Director	Company / Theatre
1965	When We Are Married (Stage debut)	Ruby Birtle		Bristol Old Vic / Theatre Royal, Bristol
1965–1967	Mrs. Warren's Profession	Vivie		Bristol Old Vic / Theatre Royal, Bristol
1965–1967	War and Peace	Natasha		Bristol Old Vic / Theatre Royal, Bristol
1965–1967	The Homecoming	Ruth		Bristol Old Vic / Theatre Royal, Bristol
1967	The Dance of Death	Judith		National Theatre, London
1967	A Flea in Her Ear	Antoinette		National Theatre
1969	The Way of the World	Mincing, later Mrs. Fainall		National Theatre
1969	Macrune's Guevara	Tania		National Theatre
1969	The White Devil	Zanche		National Theatre
1969	The Travails of Sancho Panza	Don Quixote's niece		National Theatre
1970	The Merchant of Venice	Jessica		National Theatre
1970–1971	Scapino	Zerbinetta		Young Vic Theatre, London
1970–1971	The Taming of the Shrew	Katherina		Young Vic Theatre
1970–1971	Oedipus	Jocasta		Young Vic Theatre
1970–1971	Measure for Measure	Isabella		Young Vic Theatre
1971	The Captain of Köpenick	Lieschen		National Theatre
1974	Macbeth	Lady Macduff		Royal Shakespeare Company
1974	Uncle Vanya	Sonya		Royal Shakespeare Company
1975	As You Like It	Rosalind		Nottingham Playhouse, Nottingham, then Edinburgh Festival, Edinburgh
1975	Twelfth Night	Viola		Royal Shakespeare Company, Stratford, then Aldwych Theatre, London
1975	A Month in the Country	Vera		Royal Shakespeare Company / Albery Theatre, London
1975	A Room with a View	Lucy Honeychurch		Royal Shakespeare Company / Albery Theatre
30 May 1976	As You Like It	Rosalind	Peter Gill	Riverside Studios, London
1976	The Duchess of Malfi	Title role		Bristol Old Vic / Theatre Royal, Bristol
1979	Love's Labour's Lost	Rosaline		Stratford, 1978 then Aldwych Theatre
1979	Piaf	Édith Piaf	Howard Davies	The Other Palace, London, then Warehouse Theatre, London, later Aldwych Theatre
1980	Piaf	Édith Piaf	Howard Davies	Wyndham's Theatre and Piccadilly Theatre, London
5 Feb 1981 – 28 Jun 1981	Piaf	Édith Piaf	Howard Davies	Royal Shakespeare Company / Plymouth Theatre, New York City
1983	Kick for Touch	Eileen	Peter Gill	National Theatre
12 September 1983 –	Dear Anyone	agony aunt		Birmingham Repertory Theatre
8 November 1983 –	Dear Anyone	agony aunt		Cambridge Theatre
1984	Venice Preserv'd	Belvidera		National Theatre
15 May 1984 –	Antigone	Antigone	John Burgess and Peter Gill	National Theatre / Cottesloe Theatre, London
1985	Saint Joan	Title role		Compass Company
1986	Double Double			Fortune Theatre, London
1986	Misalliance			Royal Shakespeare Company
1986	Archbishop's Ceiling			Royal Shakespeare Company
1988	Greenland			Royal Court Theatre, London
1989–1990	Shadowlands	Joy Davidman		Queen's Theatre, London
1992	Hamlet	Gertrude		Royal Shakespeare Company / Barbican Theatre, London
1993	Ghosts	Mrs. Alving		Royal Shakespeare Company / The Other Place Theatre, Stratford
26 November 1996 – 1997	Henry VIII (also known as The Famous History of the Life of Henry VIII)	Katherine of Aragon	Gregory Doran	Royal Shakespeare Company / Swan Theatre, Stratford-upon-Avon
18 February 1998 –	Henry VIII (also known as The Famous History of the Life of Henry VIII)	Katherine of Aragon	Gregory Doran	Royal Shakespeare Company / Young Vic Theatre
10 September 2006	The Rape of Lucrece		Gregory Doran	Royal Shakespeare Company / Swan Theatre, Stratford-upon-Avon
October 2013 – 16 November 2013	Richard II	Duchess of Gloucester	Gregory Doran	Royal Shakespeare Company / Royal Shakespeare Theatre, Stratford-upon-Avon
December 2013 – 25 January 2014	Richard II	Duchess of Gloucester	Gregory Doran	Royal Shakespeare Company / Barbican Theatre
September 2015 – 25 October 2015	Henry V	Queen Isobel	Gregory Doran	Royal Shakespeare Company / Royal Shakespeare Theatre, Stratford-upon-Avon
7 November 2015 – 30 December 2015	Henry V	Queen Isobel	Gregory Doran	Royal Shakespeare Company / Barbican Theatre
April 2016 –	Henry V	Queen Isobel	Gregory Doran	Royal Shakespeare Company / New York
Major Tours
21 May 1998 – 7 June 1998	Henry VIII (also known as The Famous History of the Life of Henry VIII)	Katherine of Aragon	Gregory Doran	Royal Shakespeare Company / Brooklyn Academy of Music Majestic Theater, New York
9 June 1998 – 5 July 1998	Henry VIII (also known as The Famous History of the Life of Henry VIII)	Katherine of Aragon	Gregory Doran	Royal Shakespeare Company / John F. Kennedy Center for the Performing Arts, Washington, DC
1999	A Master Class with Maria Callas		Di Trevis	British cities: Theatre Royal, Bath …

== Radio ==
Date	Title	Role	Director	Station
9 Dec 1972	The Lady with the Little Dog	Anna	Jane Graham	BBC Radio 4 Afternoon Play
28 Jan 1974	The Dark is Light Enough	Gelda	Jane Graham	BBC Radio 4 The Monday Play
13 Jul 1976	The Eating House	The woman	Betty Davies	BBC Radio 3 Drama Now
2 Feb 1977	Caring Incorporated	Judith	Jane Morgan	BBC Radio 4 Afternoon Theatre
22 May 1979	Dr Piffoel	George Sand	John Theocharis	BBC Radio 3
19 Oct 1980	Electra	Electra	Jane Morgan	BBC Radio 4 Afternoon Theatre
29 Mar 1981	Plenty	Susan Traherne	Richard Wortley	BBC Radio 3
8 Mar 1984	Boris Godunov	Marina Mniszek	John Theocharis	BBC Radio 3
29 Dec 1984	The Maltese Falcon	Brigid O'Shaughnessy	Jane Morgan	BBC Radio 4 Saturday-Night Theatre
13 Feb 1989	First Things Last	Simone	Jane Morgan	BBC Radio 4
20 Feb 1989	That Cunard Woman	Nancy Cunard	Penny Gold	BBC Radio 4
30 Apr 1993	A Sorceress of Her Time	Alma Mahler	Rosemary Hart	BBC Radio 3
30 December 1994	The Wolves of Willoughby Chase	Miss Slighcarp	Cherry Cookson	BBC Radio 4 Saturday Night Theatre
4 May 1995	Pen Pals	Fay Fuller	Shaun MacLoughlin	BBC Radio 4 Globe Theatre 95
12 Oct 1995	Bertie and the Crime of Passion	Sarah Bernhardt	Matthew Walters	BBC Radio 4
18 May 1997 – 1 Jun 1997	Mansfield Park	Mrs Norris	Sue Wilson	BBC Radio 4 Classic Serial
12 Feb 1998	Come to Me	Greta	Jane Morgan	BBC Radio 4 Afternoon Play
13 Nov 1998	In Singapore	Sally	Vanessa Whitburn	BBC Radio 4 Afternoon Play
27 Nov 1998	Writing Home	Mother	Cherry Cookson	BBC Radio 4 Afternoon Play
5 Dec 2000 – 7 Dec 2000	Plays of the Severn	Voice of the River	Peter Leslie Wild; Sue Wilson	BBC Radio 4 Afternoon Play
18 May 2001	I'll Be George	George Sand	Ned Chaillet	BBC Radio 4 The Friday Play
4 Jun 2001 – 15 Jun 2001	Byron's Women	Lady Melbourne	Clive Brill	BBC Radio 4 Woman's Hour Drama
28 Jan 2002	A Thousand Ships	Helen	Peter Kavanagh	BBC Radio 4 Afternoon Play
22 Oct 2004	Arthur: The Sword of the King	Morgan	Gordon House	BBC Radio 4 Afternoon Play
29 Oct 2004	Arthur: The Black Dog	Morgan	Gordon House	BBC Radio 4 Afternoon Play
5 Nov 2004	Arthur: The Lake'	Morgan	Jeremy Mortimer	BBC Radio 4 Afternoon Play
12 Nov 2004	Arthur: The Moon Eats the Sun	Morgan	Jeremy Mortimer	BBC Radio 4 Afternoon Play
19 Nov 2004	Arthur: The Grail	Morgan	Jeremy Mortimer	BBC Radio 4 Afternoon Play
26 Nov 2004	Arthur: The Last Battle	Morgan	Jeremy Mortimer	BBC Radio 4 Afternoon Play
27 Feb 2005	The Gospel According to Mary Magdalene	Mary Magdalene	Marina Caldarone	BBC Radio 3 Drama on 3
7 Mar 2005	Scenes of Seduction	Mme Etcheberri	Ned Chaillet	BBC Radio 4 Afternoon Play
1 Jun 2005	Exiled from Paradise	Roznay	Claudine Toutoungi	BBC Radio 4 Afternoon Play
23 Sep 2007 – 30 Sep 2007	The Waves	Jinny	Terence Davies	BBC Radio 4 Classic Serial
14 Feb 2010 – 28 Feb 2010	Plantagenet	Queen Eleanor	Jeremy Mortimer	BBC Radio 4 Classic Serial
23 Jan 2011	Living with Princes	Catherine de Medici	Jeremy Mortimer	BBC Radio 3 Drama on 3
25 Nov 2012 – 16 Dec 2012	The Count of Monte Cristo	Haydee	Jeremy Mortimer; Sasha Yevtushenko	BBC Radio 4 Classic Serial

Radio interviews (available to listen again)
Date	Title	Synopsis	Station	Link
9 Jun 1981	Meridian – British Theatre on a Winning Streak in New York	Tony Awards: Jane Lapotaire won best actress as Piaf	BBC World Service	Meridian – British Theatre on a Winning Streak in New York
17 Feb 1983	Meridian	Jane Lapotaire on her role in writer-director Peter Gill's Kick For Touch at The National's Cottesloe Theatre	BBC World Service	Meridian
17 August 1986	Desert Island Discs	In conversation with Michael Parkinson, she recalls her difficult childhood in a foster home, and how she became an actress	BBC Radio 4	Desert Island Discs: Jane Lapotaire
9 Nov 1993	Meridian – Treading the Boards	Actors who trained at the Old Vic Theatre School in Bristol reflect on their experiences	BBC World Service	Meridian – Treading the Boards
22 Jan 2016	My Classical Favourites		BBC Radio 3	My Classical Favourites: Jane Lapotaire

== Awards and honours ==
In April 2018, Lapotaire became the 29th recipient of the prestigious Pragnell Shakespeare Birthday Award and gave the 454th Shakespeare Birthday Lecture on 20 April 2018.

Lapotaire was appointed Commander of the Order of the British Empire (CBE) in the 2025 Birthday Honours for services to drama and attended the investiture ceremony at Windsor Castle in February 2026.

Year	Nominee / work	Award	Result
1978	Marie Curie (1977)	British Academy Television Award for Best Actress	Nominated
1989	Blind Justice (1988)	British Academy Television Award for Best Actress	Nominated

Year	Nominee / work	Award	Result
1981	Piaf (1978–1981)	Tony Award for Best Actress in a Play	Won
1983	Piaf (1978–1981)	CableACE Award for Actress in a Theatrical or Non-Musical Program	Nominated

Year	Nominee / work	Award	Result
2020	The Crown (2019)	Gold Derby TV Award for Drama Guest Actress	Nominated
