= Stella Gonet =

British actress (born 1960)

- Born: 12 December 1960 (age 65); Greenock, Renfrewshire, Scotland
- Education: Royal Conservatoire of Scotland
- Years active: 1985–present
- Spouse: Nicholas Farrell (m. 2005)
- Children: 1

Stella Gonet (born 12 December 1960) is a Scottish theatre, film and television actress. She is known for her roles in the BBC dramas The House of Eliott (1991–94) and Holby City (2007–09). Her stage credits include playing Ophelia in the 1989 National Theatre revival of Hamlet, opposite both Daniel Day-Lewis and Ian Charleson as Hamlet and playing Margaret Thatcher in the original West End production of Handbagged (2014). She played Queen Elizabeth II in the 2021 movie Spencer and Margaret Thatcher in the 2023 movie El Conde.

== Early life ==
Gonet was born in Greenock, Scotland. Her Polish father met her Scottish mother, a teacher of English, when he was stationed in Greenock during the Second World War. She is the seventh of twelve children and four of her sisters are nurses.

== Career ==
Gonet starred as Beatrice Eliott, one of the two lead roles, in three series of the television drama The House of Eliott and played Chief Executive Officer Jayne Grayson in the medical drama Holby City. She appeared in Casualty, The Crow Road, Dalziel and Pascoe, The Inspector Lynley Mysteries, Foyle's War, Outnumbered and Lewis. She played a villain in the mini-series The Secret and played Grace Maplin in the Sins of Commission episode of Midsomer Murders. Her screen credits also include For Queen and Country, Nicholas Nickleby and Red Mercury.

Gonet also has acted extensively in the theatre. In 1989 she appeared as Ophelia in the National Theatre production of Hamlet, with the title role being played by Daniel Day-Lewis, Ian Charleson and finally Jeremy Northam.

She played Margaret Thatcher in the Moira Buffini play Handbagged in 2013 at the Tricycle Theatre, and in 2014 at the Vaudeville Theatre when the play transferred to the West End. She played Elizabeth in the 2018 BBC1 drama series The Cry.

In 2020, she played Caroline Sturgess in the BBC drama The Salisbury Poisonings. From 2020 to 2023 she appeared in the Sky television series Breeders.

Collaborating with Chilean filmmaker Pablo Larraín, Gonet appeared in the films Spencer (2021) and El Conde (2023) as Queen Elizabeth II and Margaret Thatcher respectively.

=== Television ===
Year	Title	Role	Notes
1985	Gems	Noreen	
1986	To Have and to Hold	Ellie	
1986	Casualty	Dr. Clare Wainwright	Episodes: "Jump Start" and "Professionals"
1987	ScreenPlay	Mairi	Episode: "The Shutter Falls"
1988	The Play on One	Rachel	Episode: "Down Where the Buffalo Go"
1989	The Bill	Mrs. Lavery	Episode: "The Chain of Command"
1991	The Advocates	Alex Abercorn	Series 1
1991	Heading Home	Beryl James	Part of Screen Two
1991–1994	The House of Eliott	Beatrice Eliott	34 episodes
1992	Screen Two	Marigold	Episode: "The Common Pursuit"
1992	Stalin	Zinaida Pavlutskaya	
1993	French and Saunders	Beatrice	Episode: "The House of Idiot"
1996	Screen One	Kate Armstrong	Episode: "Trip Trap"
1996	The Crow Road	Fiona Urvill	
1996	Drop the Dead Donkey	Anthea	Episode: "Sex 'n Death"
1998	Verdict	Alex Horton-Smith	Episode: "Split Second"
1998	Supply & Demand	DCI Jane Leyland	
2002	The Secret	Nadia Collins	
2004	Midsomer Murders	Grace Maplin	Episode: "Sins of Commission"
2004	Foyle's War	Barbara Hicks	Episode: "They Fought in the Fields"
2005	The Inspector Lynley Mysteries	Lady Sarah Keach	Episode: "In the Guise of Death"
2005	Murder in Suburbia	Felicity Hendon	Episode: "Viva La Salsa"
2005	Where the Heart Is	Wendy	Episode: "Sisters Under the Skin"
2005	Taggart	Val	Episode: "A Taste of Money"
2005	Julian Fellowes Investigates: A Most Mysterious Murder	Grace Duff	Episode: "The Case of the Croydon Poisonings"
2006	Dalziel and Pascoe	Christine Webster	Episode: "Guardian Angel"
2007	Persuasion	Mrs. Musgrove	
2007	Roman Mysteries	Queen Berenice of Judea	Episode: "The Enemies of Jupiter"
2007	Rebus	Cynthia Marber	Episode: "Resurrection Men"
2007–2009	Holby City	Jayne Grayson	67 episodes
2008	Casualty	Jayne Grayson	Episodes: "Thicker Than Water" and "Diamond Dogs"
2010	Lewis	Frances Woodville	Episode: "The Dead of Winter"
2011	Outnumbered	Mrs. Henderson	Episode: "The Labrador"
2013	Father Brown	Lady Margaret Galloway	Episode: "The Face of Death"
2014	Silk	Christine Barnaby	Episode: "Big Fish, Small Pond"
2014–2016	Siblings	Marion	Episodes: "Laser Eye Date", "Burrito Neighbours", and "Golden Aunt"
2015	Humans	Frances Walker	2 episodes
2017	Man Down	Mrs. Lipsey	Series 4
2017	The Crown	Margaret Lambert	Episode: "Vergangenheit"
2018	The Cry	Elizabeth	
2020	The Salisbury Poisonings	Caroline Sturgess	
2021	Breeders	Leah	
2026	Professor T	Lady Cynthia	S5 E3: "Retreat"

=== Film ===
Year	Title	Role	Notes
2021	Spencer	Elizabeth II	
2023	El Conde	Margaret Thatcher	
2025	28 Years Later	Jenny	

== Personal life ==
Gonet married English actor Nicholas Farrell in 2005. The couple co-starred in an episode of Roman Mysteries as Queen Berenice of Judea and Emperor Titus, and as Mr. and Mrs. Musgrove in ITV's 2007 production of Jane Austen's Persuasion, and they both participated in a 2001 Shakespeare's Richard III audiobook. The couple have a daughter, Natasha, born in 2000.

== In popular culture ==
In the 2026 film Elsinore which focuses on Ian Charleson's performances as Hamlet in 1989, Gonet, who played Ophelia, is played by Alyth Ross.
