= Troy (BBC radio drama) =

Troy is a trilogy of radio plays, first broadcast on BBC Radio 3 from 28 November to 30 November 1998. The cast is led by Paul Scofield, who came out of retirement to take part. Troy was written by Andrew Rissik and produced by Jeremy Mortimer. The trilogy is a companion piece to King Priam, Rissik's earlier more optimistic take on the story in which Scofield took the title role.

The three parts of Troy are

- King Priam and His Sons
- The Death of Achilles
- Helen at Ephesus

Troy was repeated the year following its first transmission and has been broadcast on BBC Radio 7 every year from 2004 to 2009 and on its successor channel BBC Radio 4 Extra in 2012. It has also been broadcast in other countries, for example by ABC Classic FM in 1999 and 2000.

== Cast ==
Actor	Role
Toby Stephens	Achilles
James Hayes	Aegisthus
Oliver Cotton	Agamemnon
Ian Hogg	Anacreon
Emma Fielding	Andromache
Cassandra Sperry	Electra
Deborah Findlay	Hecabe
Michael Maloney	Hector
Geraldine Somerville	Helen
Paul Scofield	Hermes
Lindsay Duncan	Klytemnestra
James Laurenson	Menelaus
Geoffrey Whitehead	Nikanor
Abigail Docherty	Oenone
Jean-Marc Perret	Orestes
Michael Sheen	Paris
Saeed Jaffrey.	Parmenion
David Harewood	Patroclus
Julian Glover	Priam
Eleanor Bron,	Thetis

== Episodes ==
Troy consists of three 90-minute plays.

=== King Priam and His Sons ===
The first episode starts with the events around Paris's birth, the prophecies that he would bring about the destruction of Troy and King Priam's decision to have him exposed on Mount Ida. It continues with his decision to leave his foster-father Anacreon and lover Oenone to go to Troy to plead for the return of a bull that is being taken there for sacrifice and Priam's subsequent recognition and acceptance of him as his son. It concludes with Paris's elopement with Helen from Sparta and Priam's decision to support the two lovers rather than return Helen to her husband Menalaus and his consequent acceptance of the war with the Greeks.

=== The Death of Achilles ===
The second episode concentrates on the final year of the war. It covers the quarrel between Achilles and Agamemnon, the deaths of Patroclus, Hector, Achilles and Paris and concludes with the Trojan Horse and the fall of Troy.

=== Helen at Ephesus ===
The final episode concerns events after the war. It covers Klytemnestra's revenge on Agamemnon and their children Orestes and Electra's revenge on her and subsequent sentencing. It also portrays the lives of Menalaus and Helen after they are separated by a shipwreck and she is raped, mutilated and sold into slavery by pirates. It ends with their reunion.

== Men Do Not Go to War Over Women ==
Gina Landor has adapted a selection from the trilogy as Men Do Not Go to War Over Women. It features speeches by Helen and Klytemnestra. Landor has performed it at the Battersea Arts Centre in 2000 and at the British Museum in 2004. She has also taken it to the Balkans.

== Critical reception ==
When Troy was first transmitted it received much praise. The Independent's critic Robert Hanks summed up its approach to its subject as follows: "If Troy has a theme, it is accepting what life throws at you, the grace that is left when ambition and possessions and everything else you thought made life enjoyable have been stripped away". He praised the play's "boldly conceived, always searching approach to the story and its infinite meanings" and the strength of the casting, though he had qualms about the score and how the language shifted between the archaic and the modern. Colleague Sue Gaisford had no such reservations stating "Jeremy Mortimer's production of Andrew Rissik's trilogy is probably the greatest radio drama [anyone] could ever hear". She praises the language as "spare, poetic, beautiful", noting the use sometimes of iambic pentameter and extended imagery. Ken Garner of The Express on Sunday noted that "most of the acting was intimate, understated, with long monologues. Only in the conflict between Achilles (Toby Stephens) and Hektor (Michael Maloney) did language and delivery match the violent action." In contrast to Hanks, he saw the score as a positive element "It still made sense stripped of verbal passion. Nick Russell-Pavier and David Chilton's martial music supplied the tension bled out of the script." In summation, "This was a Trojan War for our time, a tale of intimate, everyday human weakness; they sought 'the life of quietness', while knowing their desire was destroying it."
