= Elizabeth Rider =

British actress

- Born: Elizabeth Rider; 1958 (age 67–68)
- Other name: Liza Rider
- Education: Guildhall School of Music and Drama
- Occupation: Actress
- Years active: 1979–present

Elizabeth Rider (born 1958) is an English actress. Her career is marked by diverse roles in numerous television dramas.

== Early life ==
Born in Newark-on-Trent in 1958, Rider trained at the Guildhall School of Music and Drama, where she was awarded its Gold Medal. From there, she joined the BBC's Radio Drama Company after winning the Carleton Hobbs Bursary, which gave her a contract for six months.

== Career ==
Rider's first television acting job was as Nora in the BBC's 1979 series Testament of Youth. In 1997, she landed the role of Sheila Thwaite in The Lakes. In 1999, she appeared in ITV soap opera Coronation Street as Ashley Peacock's biological mother. In 2004, she had a ten-episode role playing Jill Green in EastEnders.

Rider appeared in Series Two and Three of the drama At Home with the Braithwaites in 2001 and 2002, as Helen Braithwaite. She also voiced Atris in the video game Star Wars Knights of the Old Republic II: The Sith Lords. She appeared in five episodes in Series 23 of the long-running medical drama series Casualty, playing troubled mum Cathy Malone. She has also appeared in Heartbeat, Emmerdale, Holby City, Hollyoaks, The Street, The Accused, The Tunnel, Call the Midwife, Marchlands, Informer and the 2013 Doctor Who Christmas Special, "The Time of the Doctor", among many other dramas. From 2009 to 2017, Rider portrayed the recurring role of DCI Lynette Driver on the BBC soap opera Doctors.

== Filmography ==
=== Film ===
Year	Title	Role	Notes
1984	Breakout	WPC	
1985	Sacred Hearts		
1985	The Wrong Type		Voice role; short film
1997	Stone Cold	Lesley	
2005	Brothers of the Head	Roberta Howe	
2016	Letters from Baghdad	Lady Elsa Richmond	Documentary

=== Television ===
Year	Title	Role	Notes
1979	Testament of Youth	Norah	Miniseries; episode: "Buxton 1914"
1980	Breakaway	Schoolteacher	Episode: "The Local Affair: Part 2"
1981	Sons and Lovers	Gladys	Miniseries; 1 episode
1985	Marguerite Duras: Worn Out with Desire to Write	Reader	TV documentary
1986	Refuse to Dance: The Theatre of Howard Barker		TV documentary
1988	Hard Cases	Woman on bus	2 episodes
1992	Civvies	Suzie Dillon	Miniseries; main role
1993, 2004, 2007, 2009	The Bill	Tina Rogers / Josephine Eyre / Sarah Callaghan / Diane Silk	5 episodes
1993	Agatha Christie's Poirot	Grace	Episode: "Jewel Robbery at the Grand Metropolitan"
1993	Between the Lines	Det. Sgt. Jackie Whittaker	Episode: "Honourable Men"
1994, 1998, 2000	Peak Practice	Alison Farnham / Patricia Davey / Anne Meadows	3 episodes
1995, 2008–2009	Casualty	Cathy Malone / Bev Elliott	6 episodes
1996	Dangerfield	Jackie Creed	Episode: "Old Dog, Old Tricks"
1996, 2000	Pond Life	Ruth / Additional voices	Voice role; 3 episodes
1997	Wycliffe	Trisha Tyzack	Episode: "Close to Home"
1997–1999	The Lakes	Sheila Thwaite	Main role
1998	Out of Hours	Mrs. Boyd	Miniseries; 1 episode
1999, 2004, 2009	Heartbeat	Mrs. Constance Manners / Dawn Buckland / Stella	3 episodes
1999	Where the Heart Is	Carol Williams	Episode: "A Special Language"
1999, 2006	Coronation Street	Kathleen Gutteridge / Genna	15 episodes
2000	Donovan Quick	Grief Stricken Woman	Television film
2001, 2005, 2012, 2015	Holby City	Linda Haywood / Annie Franklin / Carol Bennett / Polly Thomas	4 episodes
2001–2002	At Home with the Braithwaites	Helen Braithwaite	5 episodes
2002	Murder	DS Wenthworth	Miniseries; main role
2002	Bad Girls	Ms. Green	Episode: "Marriage of Inconvenience"
2002	Lenny Blue	Mrs. Cooper	Miniseries
2003	Red Cap	Carol Rossel	Episode: "H-Hour"
2003	A Touch of Frost	Helen Burrell	Episode: "Close Encounters"
2003	Cold Feet	Counsellor	1 episode
2003	Sweet Medicine	Mrs. Campbell	1 episode
2004–2008	EastEnders	Nurse Jill Green	10 episodes
2004	Hustle	June	Episode: "A Touch of Class"
2004	A Thing Called Love	Maureen Scant	Miniseries; 3 episodes
2005	Julian Fellowes Investigates: A Most Mysterious Murder	Georgiana Gardiner	Docudrama; episode: "The Case of Rose Harsent"
2005, 2008–2017	Doctors	Denise Roberts / Louise McBride / Lynette Driver	Recurring roles
2006	Hotel Babylon	Mrs Johnson	1 episode
2006	The Royal	Miss Wilkinson	Episode: "Keep On Running"
2006	Jane Hall	Negotiator	1 episode
2007	Silent Witness	Laura Egerton	Episode: "Apocalypse: Part 2"
2007	The Street	Mother	Episode: "Old Flame"
2008, 2010, 2012, 2015	Emmerdale	Fiona MacPherson / Doctor / Defence solicitor/ Solicitor	4 different roles
2008	The Royal Today	Kate Danson	1 episode
2008	Waterloo Road	Sheila Hanson	1 episode
2008, 2013	Doctor Who	Atmos Voice / Linda	2 episodes
2009	Inspector George Gently	Mrs. Alderton	Episode: "Gently in the Blood"
2009–2011	Waking the Dead	Maureen Smith	Recurring role; 7 episodes (series 8–9)
2010	Agatha Christie's Marple	Mrs. Davis	Episode: "The Pale Horse"
2010	The Sarah Jane Adventures	Mistress Ellen	2 episodes
2010	Law & Order: UK	Fiona Sears	Episode: "Help"
2010	Accused	Kerry Duggan	Episode: "Kenny's Story"
2011	Marchlands	Older Olive Runcie	Miniseries; main role
2012	Call the Midwife	Peggy	2 episodes
2013	The Tunnel	Neighbour	1 episode
2014	Our Zoo	Celia	Miniseries; 1 episode
2014	Lewis	Lorraine Fernsby	Episode: "Entry Wounds
2015	Suspects	Grace Jenkins	Episode: "Victim"
2015	The Casual Vacancy	Maggie	Miniseries; 2 episodes
2015	The Scandalous Lady W	Elizabeth Figg	Television film
2015	Lady Chatterley's Lover	Mrs. Betts	Television film
2015	Doctor Foster	Mary	1 episode
2016	Midsomer Murders	Bobbie Loxley	Episode: "Habeas Corpus"
2018	Vera	Eileen Hennings	Episode: "Blood and Bone"
2018	Informer	Lady Justice Spencer	Miniseries; main role
2018	Mrs Wilson	Gladys Wilson	Miniseries; 1 episode
2018	Care	Helen	Television film
2019, 2021	Line of Duty	DCC Andrea Wise	5 episodes
2019	Doc Martin	Lamorna Hammond	Episode: "To the Lighthouse"
2019	The Cure	Toni Brisby	Television film
2021	Showtrial	Judge Isobel Cavendish	BBC Television Series
2021	Shadow and Bone	Ana Kuya	
2023	Sister Boniface Mysteries	Heather Hartwood	Episode: "The Book of Shadows"
2026	Coronation Street	Sadie Milburn	Episode #11,914
TBA	True Things About Me	Mum	Upcoming film

=== Video games ===
Year	Title	Role	Notes
2004	Star Wars Knights of the Old Republic II: The Sith Lords	Atris	

== Personal life ==
Rider lives near Grantham.
