= The Pattern of Painful Adventures (radio play) =

2008 radio play by Stephen Wakelam

The Pattern of Painful Adventures is a 90-minute 2008 radio play by Stephen Wakelam on the circumstances surrounding the writing of the play Pericles, Prince of Tyre by William Shakespeare and the sickness of his brother Edmund's child, introduced by a flashback by his daughter Susannah, playwright John Marston and William's secretary Robinson. It links the play to the marriage of Susannah and the birth of her daughter and to the similar themes of daughters, forests, storms, shipwrecks and lost infants from As You Like It, The Winter's Tale, and The Tempest. It is named after The Pattern of Painful Adventures, a main source for Pericles. It was first broadcast on BBC Radio 3 at 8pm on 23 November 2008, directed and produced by Jeremy Mortimer, and was followed in the same slot on 30 November by a repeat of a 2005 radio production of Pericles, with Tom Mannion as Pericles and Benjamin Zephaniah as Gower.

== Cast ==
- William Shakespeare - Antony Sher
- Jack Robinson - Will Keen
- John Marston - Stephen Critchlow
- George Wilkins - Chris Pavlo
- Susannah Shakespeare - Helen Longworth
- Richard Burbage - John Rowe
- William Ostler / Robert Johnson - Robert Lonsdale
- Edmund Shakespeare - Joseph Kloska
