= Edward Theophilus Nelson =

Former British politician

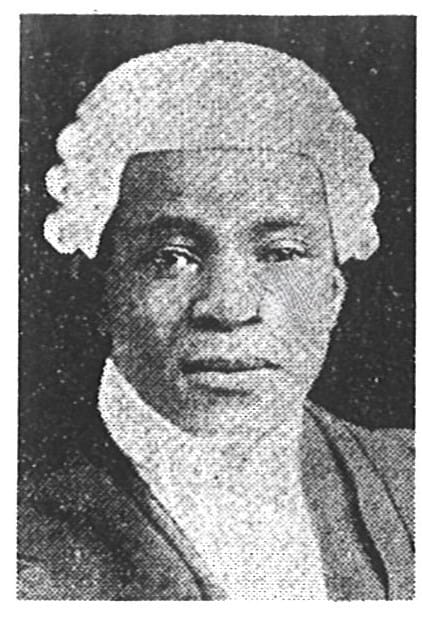
Nelson, in his barrister atire, in 1914

Edward Theophilus Nelson (22 October 1874 – 3 August 1940) was a British barrister and local politician born in British Guiana. In 1910 he attained fame as the 'coloured barrister' who successfully defended Mark Wilde, accused of the murder of George Storrs at Stalybridge.

== Life ==
Edward Nelson was born on 22 October 1874 in Georgetown, the son of a builder.

He studied at St John's College, Oxford, where he was secretary and treasurer of the Oxford Union, having been nominated to the latter position by Raymond Asquith, son of the prime minister of the United Kingdom H. H. Asquith and graduated in 1902.

He was called to the Bar from Lincoln's Inn in 1904 and served as one of the first black Junior barristers in the United Kingdom, as well as the first black barrister to practice in the Northern Circuit.

In March 1913 Nelson was elected to Hale Urban District Council for the Conservative Party. He continued to be returned to the council until his death in 1940.

In 1919 Nelson defended Africans accused of rioting in Liverpool. In 1931 he was involved in the establishment of the League of Coloured Peoples.

Nelson died on 3 August 1940 aged 66.
