= Heading Home (1991 film) =

1991 British television film

- Written by: David Hare
- Directed by: David Hare
- Starring: Gary Oldman; Joely Richardson; Stephen Dillane; Stella Gonet
- Music by: Stanley Myers
- Country of origin: United Kingdom
- Original language: English

Production
- Producer: Rick McCallum
- Cinematography: Oliver Stapleton
- Editor: Frances Parker
- Running time: 90 minutes

Original release
- Network: BBC Two
- Release: January 13, 1991

Heading Home is a British television drama film written and directed by David Hare. It was first broadcast on BBC Two on 13 January 1991 as part of the Screen Two anthology series. The film stars Gary Oldman, Joely Richardson, Stephen Dillane, and Stella Gonet.

== Plot ==
Set in post-Second World War London, Heading Home follows Janetta Wheatland, a young woman from the provinces who moves to the city to start a new life. She becomes involved with two very different men: Leonard Meopham, a charismatic figure in the Bohemian literary crowd of Soho, and Ian Tyson, an ambitious property developer. As Janetta navigates her relationships and the complexities of post-war society, she finds herself entangled in both the literary and criminal underworlds of London.

== Production ==
Heading Home was partly filmed at London Library in St James's Square, London.

== Reception ==
Heading Home has been described as being an example of Bildungsroman, a type of coming-of-age literary genre along with exploring themes of love and existentialism.

== Cast ==
- Gary Oldman as Ian Tyson
- Joely Richardson as Janetta Wheatland
- Stephen Dillane as Leonard Meopham
- Stella Gonet as Beryl James
- Michael Bryant as Derek Green
- Eugene Lipinski as Juliusz Janowski
- John Moffatt as Mr. Evernden
- Leon Eagles as Mr. Ashcroft
- Sandy McDade as Lesley Perwne
- David Schneider as Stamford Hill Cowboy
- Lollie May as Mrs. Gill
- Alan Pattison as Roman
- Irena Delmar as Singer
- Paul Reeves as Anton
- Julian Firth as Charlie
- Rowena Cooper as Older Janetta
