= A Song for Edmond Shakespeare =

A Song For Edmond Shakespeare was the second of the three radio plays by Gary Bleasdale for BBC Radio 4, on the life of Edmund Shakespeare, William's younger brother. It was first broadcast on 7 January 2005 and shortlisted to be nominated for a Sony Radio Award in 2006. The cast of the original production were

== Original cast ==
- Edmond Shakespeare - Paul Rhys
- Anne - Helen Longworth
- Ben - Stuart McLoughlin
- Christopher - Stephen Hogan
- Alice - Cherry Morris
- Crooke - Nigel Barrett
- Thomas - Robert Hastie
- Rosetta - Emily Wachter
- Gatekeeper - Hugh Dickson
