= Andrew Rissik =

British scriptwriter, journalist and critic

Andrew Rissik (born 23 April 1955) is a British scriptwriter, journalist and critic best known for the BBC Radio 3 trilogy, Troy and the five-part thriller serial for Radio 4, The Psychedelic Spy. He was theatre critic at The Independent from 1986 to 1988, and a book reviewer for The Guardian from 1999 to 2001. His full-time writing and journalistic career came to an end in early 1988 when he was diagnosed with Myalgic encephalomyelitis (M.E.), from which he still suffers.

== Early life ==
The son of a company lawyer, Rissik grew up in Buckinghamshire and was educated at St George's School, Windsor Castle (where his contemporaries included the counter tenor Michael Chance and the composer Francis Grier), Harrow School and Christ Church, Oxford, where he graduated with a Congratulatory First in English in 1977. He was elected to a junior academic position at Christ Church in 1978, but left a year later to pursue a career in drama and journalism. His student theatre experience was mostly in comedy. It included directing one of Rowan Atkinson's first appearances on the Oxford stage in a 1976 show, After Eights, partly written by Richard Curtis (whom he first met at Harrow); also a revue in 1978 for the Oxford Theatre Group on the Edinburgh Festival Fringe which again featured Richard Curtis, as well as Angus Deayton, Phil Pope, Tim McInnerny and Helen Atkinson-Wood.

== Professional ==
In London in the early 1980s Rissik taught part-time, worked as a script reader for the BBC and contributed arts criticism to many newspapers and magazines, including Harpers and Queen, Time Out, Plays and Players, the New Statesman and The Times. In 1986 he joined the founding team of The Independent as theatre and radio critic.

By then he had been working for several years as a dramatist, principally for BBC Radio 4, although a TV play was broadcast by Thames in 1981. Blue Pacific Island (1985), with Juliet Stevenson and Anthony Bate, was followed by the trilogy A Man Alone in 1986, the first play of which won him a Giles Cooper Award. King Priam, a one-hour account of the Trojan War, written as a series of interconnected monologues by the leading participants, in response to a blind-date commission, and starring Paul Scofield, was broadcast in 1987. It led – though with many false starts and delays – to 1998's four-and-a-half-hour, three-play sequence, Troy, for BBC Radio 3, which won great critical acclaim, being praised by one critic as "the greatest radio drama [anyone] could ever hear." Ken Garner, reviewing in The Express on Sunday wrote that it was "Easily the radio drama event of the year... a triumph. No one could have wanted this compulsive, gripping epic a second shorter... a Trojan War for our time", while Anne Karpf, reviewing the plays in The Guardian described them as "Irresistible. A magnificent marriage of the epic and demotic. Is there anywhere else in the world that this kind of work can be found? Radio 3: trail this, promote it, cherish it, and above all repeat it."

Troy was given a rehearsed reading at the Chichester Festival Theatre in 2000 and workshopped at the National Theatre Studio the following year. A one-woman show drawn from Troy by actress Gina Landor has been seen in London, New York, Rome, New Delhi and Belgrade.

A further thematically linked three-play sequence set in the ancient world and was broadcast by Radio 3 at Easter 2004. The first of these, Dionysos, was the third of his projects to feature Scofield, this time in one of his final roles. Dionysos was accompanied by The Art of Love, about the clash between the poet Ovid and the emperor Augustus, and Resurrection, about the confrontation between Pilate and Christ. One critic described them as being "about transitions between old gods and new, state powers and spiritual forces".

Four of Andrew Rissik's works have so far been published in 2015 by Scriptusbooks: the Troy trilogy, Dionysos, The Art of Love and Resurrection.

== Other work ==
Rissik's boyhood enthusiasm for the early James Bond films led to two pieces of work of his own: a book length study of Sean Connery's films, The James Bond Man, published in 1983, and a five-part BBC radio thriller, The Psychedelic Spy in 1990, set in 1968, and starring several names from cult TV and film of the period – Gerald Harper, Joanna Lumley, Charles Gray and Ed Bishop.

In 1986 he wrote a spoken text for Howard Goodall's new realisation of Purcell's Dido And Aeneas for The South Bank Show, and, in 1994, a script for an episode of the Terry Wogan -hosted Do The Right Thing.

== Drama ==
- 1981 Friends And Other Lovers Thames TV
- 1984 Louise and the Puppet Man BBC Radio 4
- 1985 Blue Pacific Island BBC Radio 4
- 1986 Dido and Aeneas (adaptn.) South Bank Show, LWT
- 1986 A Man Alone trilogy BBC Radio 4
- 1987 King Priam BBC Radio 4
- 1990 The Psychedelic Spy BBC Radio 4
- 1994 Do The Right Thing BBC1
- 1996 Troy trilogy BBC Radio 3
- 1998 The Birth of Paris
- 1998 The Death of Achilles
- 1998 Helen at Ephesus
- 2000 The Rector's Tale for BBC Radio 4's 2000 Tales
- 2003 Dionysos BBC Radio 3
- 2003 Jocasta BBC Radio 3
- 2004 The Art of Love BBC Radio 3
- 2004 Resurrection BBC Radio 3

== Publications ==
- The James Bond Man: The Films Of Sean Connery, Elm Tree Books, 1983
- Best Radio Plays Of 1986, ed. Nick Hern, Methuen, 1987
- Troy, a trilogy of plays [King Priam and his sons; the Death of Achilles; Helen at Ephesus] Scriptusbooks, 2015
- Dionysos Scriptusbooks, 2015
- The Art of Love Scriptusbooks, 2015
- Resurrection Scriptusbooks, 2015
