= Peasenhall murder =

1902 unsolved murder in Suffolk, England

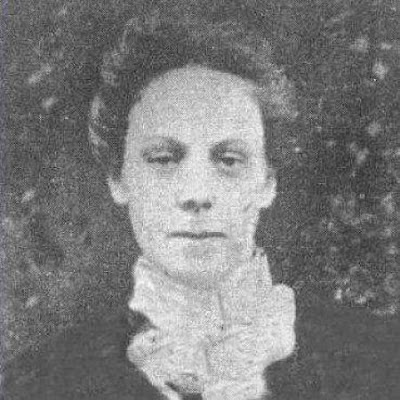
Rose Harsent

The Peasenhall murder is the unsolved murder of Rose Harsent in Peasenhall, Suffolk, England, on the night of 31 May 1902. The house where the murder occurred can be found in the centre of the village, on the opposite corner to Emmett's Store. It is a classic 'unsolved' country house murder, committed near midnight, during a thunderstorm, and with ingredients of mystery.

== Background ==
Peasenhall is a quiet village in Suffolk. In 1901 many men worked in Smyth's Seed Drill Works and attended the Primitive Methodist Chapel in neighbouring Sibton. The choirmaster of the chapel was William Gardiner and the choir members included 22-year-old Rose Anne Harsent, a domestic servant employed by elderly couple William and Georgiana Crisp at their home, Providence House, in Peasenhall.

Mrs Crisp attended the Wesleyan Methodist Chapel in Peasenhall, known as the Doctor's Chapel, and Harsent's tasks included cleaning there. William Gardiner was seen entering the chapel by Alphonso Skinner and a Mr Wright while Harsent was undertaking her duties, and rumours started to circulate; these rumours soon came to the attention of Gardiner's wife, also named Georgiana. A Primitive Methodist church investigation ensued, chaired by Rev John Guy, but nothing concrete was established. Gardiner threatened to sue the men who had spread the rumours.

== Murder and investigation ==
On the morning of 1 June 1902, Rose Harsent's body was discovered by her father, William Harsent, in the kitchen at the bottom of the stairs leading to her room in the attic. She was lying in a pool of her own blood, throat cut, with gashes on her shoulders and stab wounds. Her nightdress was burned and parts of her body were charred as if someone had attempted to set fire to her remains. She had been dead for roughly four hours and was later found to have been six months pregnant at the time of her death. The cause of death was initially suspected to be suicide, but upon further investigation of Harsent's wounds and the surrounding evidence, the police concluded that she was murdered.

The main suspect of the crime was William Gardiner, due to the rumours surrounding his relationship with Harsent, as well as circumstantial evidence found at the crime scene. He was arrested and taken into custody by local police on 3 June 1902.

It was alleged that Gardiner was the father of the unborn child. Gardiner held a position of some prominence in his employment as a foreman at the local seed drill works. He lived on the main street of Peasenhall with his wife and six children, in a small semi-detached cottage, within sight of Providence House where the murder was committed.

== Trial and aftermath ==
The police investigated the murder and Gardiner was arrested. He was tried twice at Ipswich Assizes held in the County Hall. The first trial, beginning on 7 November 1902 and lasting three days, was presided over by Sir William Grantham; the second, beginning on 20 January 1903, by Sir John Compton Lawrance. At each trial, Gardiner was prosecuted by Henry Fielding Dickens and defended by Ernest Wild. Both times the jury was unable to reach a verdict – it was said that at the first trial, the jury was split eleven to one in favour of guilty, and the second eleven to one in favour of not guilty. (Since 1974, a single juror's dissent does not prevent the jury from returning a majority verdict, but at the time it did.) The prosecution then issued a writ of nolle prosequi. This was distinct from the usual process of a formal acquittal. The consequence of this is that Gardiner is one of the few people in English history to have been tried for murder and to have no verdict ever returned.

Gardiner died in 1941. As he was never formally acquitted, he had remained under suspicion.

This case was examined in an episode of BBC One's Julian Fellowes Investigates: A Most Mysterious Murder. Fellowes concluded that the murder was perpetrated by Gardiner's wife, probably due to jealousy. He speculated that the wife would have confessed if her husband had been convicted.

== Popular culture ==
The short story "Blind Man's Hood" by John Dickson Carr, written under his pseudonym Carter Dickson, was inspired by the murder.

== Sources ==
- Robert Church, Murder in East Anglia: A New Look at Notorious Cases, Robert Hale, 1987, ISBN 0-7090-2963-2, pp. 57–75.
- Edwin Packer, The Peasenhall Murder, Yoxford Publications, 1980, ISBN 0-907265-01-4.
- Aldred, David L., "Rose of Peasenhall", Ipswich, East Anglian Magazine, Vol. 40, 1981.
- Bresler, Fenton, "The Choirmaster's Ordeal", Sunday Express, 26 May 1968.
- Cooper, Brian, Genesis 38, London, Heinemann, 1964. (Fictionalised treatment.)
- Dickens, Sir Henry F., Reminiscences, London, Heinemann, 1934.
- Fido, Martin and Keith Skinner, The Peasenhall Murder, Stroud, Alan Sutton, 1990.
- Freeman, R. Austin (ed.), Great Unsolved Crimes, London, Hutchinson, 1935.
- Futter, R. H., 'The Peasenhall Murder', Ipswich, East Anglian Magazine, Vol. 14, 1955.
- Gladstone, Rev. H. H., 'The Unsolved Mystery of Peasenhall', Ipswich, East Anglian Magazine, Vol. 24, 1964.
- Goodman, Jonathan (ed.), The Country House Murders, London, W. H. Allen, 1987.
- Henderson, William, The Trial of William Gardiner, Notable British Trials Series, London & Edinburgh, William Hodge, 1934.
- Jobson, Allan, An Hour-Glass on the Run, London, Michael Joseph, 1959.
- Jobson, Allan, "The Peasenhall Murder", Suffolk Fair Magazine, Vol. 2, 1972.
- Jobson, Allan, Something of Old Suffolk, London, Robert Hale, 1978.
- Kingston, Charles, Famous Judges and Famous Trials, London, Stanley Paul, 1923.
- Lambton, Arthur, Echoes of Causes Celebres, London, Hurst and Blackett, 1931.
- Logan, Guy B. H., Guilty or Not Guilty?, London, Stanley Paul, 1928.
- Parrish, J. M. and J. R. Crossland (eds.), The Fifty Most Amazing Crimes of the Last 100 Years, London, Odhams, 1936.
- Pemberton, Max (ed.), The Great Stories of Real Life, London, Newnes, 1924.
- Reeves, Marshall, "Suffolk Village Mystery", Master Detective magazine, June 1987.
- Rowland, John, The Peasenhall Mystery, London, John Long, 1962.
- Shew, Edmund Spencer, A Second Companion to Murder, London, Cassell, 1960.
- Smith-Hughes, Jack, Eight Studies in Justice, London, Cassell, 1953.
- Villiers, Elizabeth, Riddles of Crime, London, Werner Laurie, 1928.
- White, R. J., The Women of Peasenhall, London, Macmillan, 1969. (Fictionalised treatment).
- Wilkes, Roger, An Infamous Address, London, Grafton, 1989.
- Wilson, Colin, The Mammoth Book of True Crime, London, Robinson, 1988.

== See also ==
- List of unsolved murders (1900–1979)
- List of unsolved murders in the United Kingdom (before 1970)

== Bibliography ==
- Robert Church, Murder in East Anglia: A New Look at Notorious Cases, Robert Hale, 1987, ISBN 0-7090-2963-2, pp. 57–75.
- Caroline Maughan, Julian S. Webb, Lawyering skills and the legal process (2nd ed), Cambridge University Press, 2005, ISBN 0-521-61950-5, pp. 357–360.
- Edwin Packer, "The Peasenhall Murder", Yoxford Publications, 1980, ISBN 0-907265-01-4.
