= Gary Bleasdale =

English actor

Gary Bleasdale (born in Liverpool, Merseyside in 1962) is an English actor. Bleasdale has appeared in many television programmes since 1978 when his first role was playing the lead in an episode of the final series of Z-Cars. He played Kevin Dean in The Black Stuff (1978), and its sequel Boys From the Black Stuff, (1982). He was a regular on The Harry Enfield Show for ten years playing one of The Scousers. He has also appeared in Casualty, Roger Roger, The Bill and many other UK television dramas. He played the Sheriff's sergeant in the 2006 BBC adaptation of Robin Hood. Bleasdale played a brute in 'On The Ledge', at The Royal Court Liverpool in April/May 2008 and Terry in 'Lost Soul' at The Royal Court in September 2008. He also had a part as a bar patron in the Ouroboros episode of the BBC TV series Red Dwarf.

As a playwright he has written three radio plays for BBC Radio 4. His second radio play, A Song For Edmond Shakespeare, was shortlisted to be nominated for a Sony Radio Award in 2006. His most recent radio play, Eight Frames a Second, is a dramatised account of the life of the early cinema pioneer and inventor, William Friese-Greene.
