= Robert Lonsdale =

English actor and musician (born 1983)

- Born: 2 November 1983 (age 43); Marsden, West Yorkshire, England
- Education: Academy of Live and Recorded Arts
- Occupations: Actor; singer
- Years active: 2002–present

Robert Lonsdale (born 2 November 1983) is an English actor and musician.

== Early life and education ==
Son of Tom and Dilys Lonsdale, he was born on 2 November 1983 in Marsden, West Yorkshire, and has one sister. He went to the Academy of Live and Recorded Arts. He won the Carleton Hobbs Bursary and was once described by Tim Rice as "a young man with enormous talent".

== Career ==
Lonsdale first started acting at the age of eight. One of his first television acting roles was on Coronation Street in 2002. He has appeared on television and on stage in various roles. He has also done work on radio plays for the BBC, including All Quiet on the Western Front, Henry VIII, The Steps, Walter Now, Pilgrim, The Time Machine (on BBC Radio 3 in 2009), The Pattern of Painful Adventures (2008), On the Beach (November 2008 for Radio 4) and The Tenant of Wildfell Hall (BBC).

Lonsdale has appeared on stage in Brilliant Adventures as Luke at The Royal Court, A Life at the Finborough Theatre, and Anna Christie (alongside Jude Law and Ruth Wilson) at the Donmar Warehouse. He's also acted in La Bete (on West End/Broadway), The Indian Wants The Bronx at the Young Vic and Made in Dagenham.

In 2013, he won Best Studio Performance in Brilliant Adventures at Royal Exchange Studio for the Manchester Theatre Awards.

In 2014, Lonsdale played the lead role of Private Prewitt, the American GI in From Here to Eternity the Musical and sang several numbers in the show. This was his first musical. He released one of the number from the show, “Fight the Fight”, as a single. He was nominated for a Whatsonstage Award for Best Actor. Following From Here to Eternity he played Daniel in Another Place at The Drum, Theatre Royal, Plymouth. and one of the leading roles in the BBC's The Interceptor.

From 2015 to 2017, Lonsdale played a series regular in Chewing Gum as Connor, Tracey's (Michaela Coel) love interest and a poet.

In 2017, Lonsdale was in A Lie of the Mind at Southwark Playhouse with Gethin Anthony and Kate Fahy. The following year, he performed in the play Utility at the Orange Tree Theatre in Richmond. He appeared in the musical Standing at the Sky's Edge at the Crucible Theatre in Sheffield in 2019 and The National Theatre in 2023.

== Personal life ==
Lonsdale ran the London Marathon in 2018 on behalf of Heads Together charity, which encourages people to speak openly about mental health. He lives in South East London and has a passion for fly fishing and Liverpool F.C.

== Filmography ==
=== Film ===
Year	Title	Role	Notes
2010	White Buffalo	Harvey	Short film
2014	Walking with the Enemy	Gyula	
2025	Peak Male Excellence	Turbo	Short film

=== Television ===
Year	Title	Role	Notes
2002	Coronation Street	Dan Staveley	Episode dated 8 April 2002
2004	Heartbeat	Wayne	Episode: "The Dear Departed"
2009	Plus One	Toby's chum	Episode: "The Competition Winner"
2010	A Passionate Woman	Graham	Miniseries; episode 2
2010	Doctors	Anthony Goff	Episode: "Wedded Miss"
2011	Lost Christmas	Police constable	Television film
2011	Silent Witness	Paul Kennedy	Episode: "Lost: Part 2"
2013	Silent Witness	DC Gus Cook	2 episodes
2014	The Interceptor	Tommy	Miniseries; 8 episodes
2015–2017	Chewing Gum	Connor	Main role
2016	Lovesick	Steve	Episode: "Liv"
2017	Vera	Joe Connell	Episode: "Dark Angel"
2017	Inspector George Gently	Robert Platt	Episode: "Gently Liberated"
2020	Death in Paradise	Dave Hammond	Episode: "Murder on Mosquito Island"
2022	Anne	Christian Spooner	Miniseries; episode 3
2022	Killing Eve	Donnie	Episode: "Hello Losers"
2022	Chivalry	Rick	Regular character
2022	Pistol	Chris Thomas	Episode: "Nancy and Sid"
