= Julian Fellowes Investigates: A Most Mysterious Murder =

- Genre: Docudrama
- Written by: Julian Fellowes; Tina Pepler; Richard Monks; Julie Dixon
- Presented by: Julian Fellowes
- Starring: Michael Fassbender; Christina Cole; David Schofield; David Calder; Stella Gonet
- Country of origin: United Kingdom
- Original language: English
- No. of series: 1
- No. of episodes: 5

Production
- Producer: Clare Alan
- Running time: 60 minutes
- Production company: Touchpaper Television

Original release
- Network: BBC One
- Release: 16 October 2004 – 30 December 2005

Julian Fellowes Investigates: A Most Mysterious Murder is a British five-part docudrama series produced by Touchpaper Television (part of the RDF Media Group), which premièred on BBC One on 16 October 2004.

== Overview ==
The series presents dramatised accounts of five distinct unsolved murders from British history. Actor and Academy Award-winning screenwriter Julian Fellowes appears as a "historical detective", who guides the audience through the events leading up to the murder, and proposes a solution to each case.

Fellowes presents and narrates each episode, sometimes walking into the action to explain a point. He appears again at the end to conclude the case, putting forward his theory on the identity and motivation of the murderer.

Fellowes co-wrote all five episodes of the series.

== Episode notes ==
=== The Case of Charles Bravo ===
"The Case of Charles Bravo" was a pilot for a proposed series and was originally broadcast under the title A Most Mysterious Murder: The Case of Charles Bravo. The overarching title Julian Fellowes Investigates: A Most Mysterious Murder accompanied each subsequent episode.

Fellowes described his solution to the murder of Charles Bravo as: "surprising...there is definitely a sting in the tail. My wife and son both said I got it wrong. I want the viewers to decide."

=== The Case of the Croydon Poisonings ===
"The Case of the Croydon Poisonings" was filmed in some of the houses in the location of the original murders. Producers researched the case using old newspaper articles, and also talked to people who were in Croydon at the time.

== Episode list ==
No.	Title	Directed by	Written by	Cast	Original release date	Viewers (millions)
1	"The Case of Charles Bravo"	Michael Samuels	Tina Pepler; Julian Fellowes	Michael Fassbender, Nadia Cameron-Blakey, Michael Cochrane	16 October 2004	5.24
Julian Fellowes examines the 1876 poisoning of lawyer Charles Bravo, recently married to the widow and heiress Florence Ricardo.
2	"The Case of Rose Harsent"	Dominic Santana	Julian Fellowes; Richard Monks	Christina Cole, Elizabeth Rider, Brian Poyser	17 September 2005	4.58
Julian Fellowes examines the 1902 murder of servant girl Rose Harsent, a devout member of a Methodist chapel, who was six months pregnant when she was stabbed to death. Local preacher William Gardiner was tried twice for her murder, but not convicted.
3	"The Case of George Harry Storrs"	Dominic Santana	Tina Pepler; Julian Fellowes	David Schofield, Katrine de Candole, Paul Copley	24 September 2005	4.13
Julian Fellowes examines the unsolved case of wealthy industrialist George Harry Storrs, murdered at his home in Stalybridge in 1909.
4	"The Case of the Earl of Erroll"	Delyth Thomas	Tina Pepler; Julian Fellowes	David Calder, Julia St. John	27 December 2005	unknown
Julian Fellowes examines the 1941 murder of the Earl of Erroll in colonial Kenya. With rumours abounding about the Earl’s affair with Diana Delves Broughton, her husband Jock was put on trial for the murder.
5	"The Case of the Croydon Poisonings"	Delyth Thomas	Julie Dixon; Julian Fellowes	Jean Marsh, Stella Gonet, Amanda Root, Thomas Sangster, Richard Lumsden	30 December 2005	3.5 (overnight)
Julian Fellowes examines the unsolved murders of three members of the same upper middle-class family living in 1920s Croydon, who died within a year of each other from arsenic poisoning.

== Reception ==
Reviewing "The Case of Rose Harsent", The Stage's Harry Venning commented that: "What makes the show more than just a costumed Crimewatch is the quality of the drama at its heart. The period is beautifully evoked, real effort is made to create characters that are more than just a parade of Cluedo cut-outs and the performances are excellent." He added: "There is a disappointing absence of modern policing methods or forensic science in the process, with Fellowes drawing conclusions based on guesswork and speculation." Sam Wollaston in The Guardian was critical of the Suffolk accents in the episode but described it as: "Quite good fun – like a cross between Crimewatch and Midsomer Murders."

== See also ==
- Murder, Mystery and My Family
- Second Verdict
