= Rowena Cooper =

British actress (born 1935)

- Born: Rosemary Rowena Cooper; 1935 (age 90–91); Salisbury, Southern Rhodesia
- Other name: R. R. Cooper
- Occupation: Actress
- Spouse: Terrence Hardiman (m. 1964; died 2023)

Rosemary Rowena Cooper (born 1935) is a British actress.

She began her career in 1956, joining the Radio Drama Company by winning the Carleton Hobbs Bursary. In 1959 she joined the Dundee Repertory Theatre Company and went on to have an extensive career, primarily in British television, for more than 50 years. Cooper starred in The Rag Trade as Mrs Fenner.

== Select filmography in television ==
Year	Title	Role	Notes
1974–1978	Crown Court		
1975–1992	Rumpole of the Bailey	Marguerite "Matey" Ballard	Series 5–7
1978	Going Straight	Shirley Chapman	Probation Officer
1982	The Bell	Mrs. Mark	6 episodes
1983	Goodnight and God Bless	Audrey	2 episodes
1984	Cockles	Masha Barrington-Pyke	1 episode
1984	The Jewel in the Crown	Connie White	5 episodes
1987	Have His Carcase	Mrs. Weldon	4 episodes
1987	The New Statesman	Norman/Norma Bormann (credited as R.R. Cooper)	
1987	Victoria Wood as Seen on TV		1 episode
1989	Screen One	Edna Phillips	Episode: "Blore M.P."
1991	Heading Home	Older Janetta	Narrator
1991	Dr. Finlay	Mrs McKinney	1 episode
1997	Goodnight Sweetheart	Mrs Bamford	
1998	Jinnah	Lady Willingdon	
2000–2003	Down to Earth	Mac	
2001	Spaced	Mrs Topp, Brian's mother	
2001	A Is for Acid	Henrietta Helen Olive Robarts Durand-Deacon	
2005	Heartbeat	Nan Crossley	1 episode
2010	The Sarah Jane Adventures	Angela	"Lost in Time"

== Personal life ==
She married actor Terrence Hardiman in 1964 and the couple had two children; they remained together until his death in 2023.
