= Joseph Kloska =

English actor

- Born: Joseph A. Kloska; United Kingdom
- Occupation: Actor
- Years active: 2006–present

Joseph Anthony Kloska (born 1983) is an English actor. He began his career in radio, moving on to work in television, theatre, and film.

== Life ==
Named after a Polish grandfather, Teofil Joseph Kloska, who had settled in England, Kloska was brought up in Cornwall. As a child, he was taken to see a grisly outdoor production of Macbeth on Bodmin Moor, which made a great impression on him. After leaving Sir James Smith's School in Camelford, he attended University College London to read History and French, before training for an acting career at the Royal Academy of Dramatic Art, where he was in the same year group as Pip Carter, Kathy Rose O'Brien, Arthur Darvill, Sia Berkeley, Harry Hepple, Nathaniel Martello-White, and Danielle Ryan. He graduated in 2006.

His first career move was to join the BBC Radio Drama Company, for which he auditioned when about to leave RADA, winning the Carleton Hobbs Bursary and gaining a contract for five months' work which began a few days after the end of term. He has called this one of the best opportunities of his career, leading to work on many radio productions and introducing him to "the slightly weird world of working as an actor".

From extensive work in radio, Kloska went on to gain supporting roles in theatre and television and also cameo appearances in films.

In a Royal Shakespeare Company production of Imperium in 2017–2018, Kloska played the slave-narrator Tiro, with one reviewer commenting on his "irrepressible wit and verve".

== Theatre ==
This list is not complete

- The Vertical Hour (Royal Court Theatre, 2008), as Dennis Dutton
- Fast Labour (Hampstead Theatre, 2008), as Andrius
- Written on the Heart (Royal Shakespeare Company, Swan Theatre, (2011–2012) as Samuel Ward
- Imperium (Royal Shakespeare Company, Swan Theatre, 2017–2018), as Marcus Tullius Tiro
- Richard III (touring production, Liverpool Playhouse, Rose Theatre Kingston, 2023), as Duke of Buckingham.

== Television ==
- The Bill: Rough Justice (2007), as Andrew Stroud
- Lark Rise to Candleford (2008), as Young Footman
- Foyle's War, The Hide and The Russian House (2010), as DC Perkins
- The Rise of the Nazi Party (2013), narrator
- Jo: Invalides (2013) Dr Parent
- The Crown (2016), as Henry Herbert, 7th Earl of Carnarvon
- Pete versus Life (2010–2011), as Rob

== Films ==
- Happy-Go-Lucky (2008) as Suzy's boyfriend
- Made in Dagenham (2010), as Undersecretary 1
- Blooded (2011) as Ben Fitzpatrick
- Jane Eyre (2011) as Wood, clergyman at wedding
- The Riot Club (2014) as Ruby Wedding Man
- Cinderella (2015) as Royal Crier's Assistant
- The Little Vampire 3D (2017) as Maney
- Peterloo (2018) as Richard Carlile

== Radio ==
This list is not complete

- King Lear (BBC World Service, recorded at the Globe Theatre, 2006)
- The Brothers Karamazov (BBC Radio 4, 2006)
- Tomorrow, Today! (BBC Radio 4, 2006–2008), as Hugo Kellerman
- Peter Pan in Scarlet (BBC Radio 4, 2006), as Tootles
- The Midnight Folk (BBC Radio 4, 2006)
- Number 10 (BBC Radio 4 drama series), as Ollie Armstrong
- Oneira (BBC Radio 4 Extra, 2007)
- Caesar! (2007 series), as Crispus
- The Pattern of Painful Adventures (BBC Radio 3 play, 2008), as Edmund Shakespeare
- Howards End (BBC Radio 4, 2009), as Charles Wilcox
- Towards Zero (BBC Radio 4, 2010), as Latimer
- The First Domino (BBC Radio 3, 2010)
- Blake's 7: The Liberator Chronicles (2011), as Cullen
- I, Claudius (BBC Radio 4, 2010)
- The Acheron Pulse (2012), as Dukhin
- The Masters of Luxor (Big Finish Productions, 2012)
- Pilgrim (BBC Radio 4, 2016), as Mr Hibbens
