= Stephen Wakelam =

English writer and playwright

Stephen Wakelam is an English writer and playwright born in Chesterfield, Derbyshire. After Cambridge University, he was an English Teacher and Head of Department in South Yorkshire until he became a full-time writer in 1976. He was Young Writers' Tutor at the Royal Court Theatre from 1981–1984 and then tutored young playwrights at the National Theatre Studio in the 1990s. He has written over forty performed plays, at first mainly in television then primarily on radio. His subjects are almost exclusively biographical, covering a broad range of interests. Wakelam was The Royal Literary Society Writer in Residence at universities in Leeds and Kent, 2009–2012. From January 2015 he is Writer in Residence at St Cuthbert's Society, Durham.

== Selected works ==
- The Pattern of Painful Adventures
- Gaskin
- Coppers
- Angel Voices
- Circles of Deceit
- Deadlines
- Two Men from Delft
- Adulteries of a Provincial Wife
- Answered Prayers
- Death at the Bed End
- Punters
- Hard Knocks
- Selling Immortality
- The Finding
- The Good Samaritan
- To the Camp and Back
- Miss A and Miss M
- Letting the Birds Go Free
- Rainy Day
- Other Women
- Triangle at Rhodes
- Silver Lining
- Tea Leaf on the Roof
- The Fox
- Grassroots
- Released
- Time Passing
- What I Think of my Husband
- A Dose of Fame
- Living With Princes, on the life of Montaigne (2011)
