= Helen Longworth =

British actress (born 1976)

Helen Longworth (born 11 December 1976 in Preston, Lancashire) is a British actress.

She has appeared in many radio plays including playing the character of Zofia in six series of On Mardle Fen, Susie Dean in The Good Companions and Marina in Pericles. Also in A Song For Edmond Shakespeare (2005) and The Pattern of Painful Adventures (2008), both fictional treatments of the life of William Shakespeare.

Her TV appearances include Hollyoaks, Heartbeat, Emmerdale, Coronation Street and Doctors.

Longworth has appeared as a lead vocalist with rock band Heroes of She.

She has played the recurring character of Hannah Riley in the radio show, The Archers, aired on BBC Radio 4 since mid 2018.

== Radio ==
Date	Title	Role	Director	Station
28 December 2014	"Pilgrim"	Binnie Beauregarde	Marc Beeby	BBC Radio 4 Afternoon Play
27 December 2004	Boxing Clever	Veronica	Toby Swift	BBC Radio 4 Afternoon Play
4 May 2005	Claw Marks on the Curtain: Fur	Eleanor	Ned Chaillet	BBC Radio 4 Woman's Hour Drama
29 November 2005	French Sex at the Wilmslow Rex	Helen	Toby Swift	BBC Radio 4 Afternoon Play
5 December 2005 – 30 December 2005	David Copperfield	Martha	Jeremy Mortimer and Mary Peate	BBC Radio 4 Woman's Hour Drama
2 April 2007 – 6 April 2007	Captain Starlight's Apprentice	Rose	Lu Kemp	BBC Radio 4 Woman's Hour Drama
18 June 2008	Listen to the Words	Dr Susan	Jessica Dromgoole	BBC Radio 4 Afternoon Play
1 September 2008	Peter Lorre vs Peter Lorre	Helen Hafner	Toby Swift	BBC Radio 4 Afternoon Play
23 November 2008	The Pattern of Painful Adventures	Susannah Shakespeare	Jeremy Mortimer	BBC Radio 3 Drama on 3
4 February 2009	Déjà Vu	Translator	Lu Kemp and Christophe Rault	BBC Radio 4 Afternoon Play
