= In Suspicious Circumstances =

- Genre: True crime
- Directed by: various, inc. Ian White, Julian Farino, Richard Signy
- Presented by: Edward Woodward
- Music by: Matthew Scott
- Country of origin: United Kingdom
- Original language: English
- No. of series: 5
- No. of episodes: 39

Production
- Executive producer: Dianne Nelmes
- Producer: Sue Durkan
- Running time: 52 minutes
- Production company: Granada Television

Original release
- Network: ITV
- Release: 3 June 1991 – 11 October 1996

In Suspicious Circumstances is a British true crime drama television series produced by Granada Television for ITV between 3 June 1991 and 11 October 1996. Re-enactments of historical crimes were introduced by Edward Woodward.

Granada's Head of Factual Drama Ian McBride described the show as revisiting "an atmospheric past as Edward Woodward intrigues the viewer by walking through period sets and examining the unknown quirks of a crime gone by."

In 1996, several writers accused the show of plagiarism. However, Granada executives claimed that their researchers had used the same source materials as the claimants. Of the 21 claims of copyright infringement which were heard in court, four were upheld and the rest dismissed.

Boxtree published a tie-in book featuring 11 true cases of infamous crimes from the 1870s to the 1980s.

On 12 November 2022, Talking Pictures TV began repeating the series on Saturday evenings.
