= List of Taggart episodes =

Episodes of the Scottish television show Taggart

Taggart is a Scottish detective fiction television programme, created by Glenn Chandler, who wrote many of the episodes, and made by STV Studios for the ITV network. The series revolves around a group of detectives initially in the Maryhill CID of Strathclyde Police, though various storylines have happened in other parts of the Greater Glasgow area, and as of the most recent series the team have operated out of the fictional John Street police station across the street from the Glasgow City Chambers. It was one of the UK's longest-running dramas and is the longest-running police drama after the cancellation of The Bill.

The series was preceded by the pilot miniseries "Killer", over 3 consecutive Tuesdays in September 1983. During the course of the programme, 109 episodes of Taggart aired, including eight specials over twenty-seven series, between 2 July 1985 and 7 November 2010.

== Series overview ==
Series	Episodes	Originally released	
Series	Episodes	First released	Last released
Pilot	3	6–20 September 1983	
1	2	2 July 1985	6 August 1985
2	2	24 February 1986	16 September 1986
3	2	15 April 1987	23 September 1987
Christmas Special		31 December 1987	
4	2	7 September 1988	12 October 1988
Christmas Special		30 December 1988	
5	1	5 September 1989	19 September 1989
New Year Special		1 January 1990	
6	3	1 March 1990	17 December 1990
Christmas Special		31 December 1990	
New Year Special		1 January 1992	
7	2	9 January 1992	13 February 1992
8	2	17 September 1992	22 October 1992
New Year's Special		1 January 1993	
9	4	16 February 1993	14 October 1993
New Year's Special		1 January 1994	
10	2	6 October 1994	3 November 1994
11	3	11 January 1995	16 November 1995
12	3	4 January 1996	3 October 1996
13	2	16 January 1997	18 September 1997
14	5	1 January 1998	1 November 1998
15	4	16 January 1999	21 November 1999
16	4	26 February 2000	28 September 2000
New Year's Special		10 January 2001	
17	4	14 January 2002	16 July 2002
18	7	14 December 2002	25 January 2003
19	4	7 October 2003	30 December 2004
20	5	6 January 2005	3 February 2005
21	7	15 September 2005	16 December 2005
22	2	22 March 2006	29 March 2006
23	4	3 January 2007	4 July 2007
24	6	8 January 2008	5 June 2008
25	5	3 November 2008	30 December 2008
26	5	20 February 2009	24 December 2009
27	9	18 July 2010	7 November 2010

== Episodes ==
=== Pilot (1983) ===
No.	Title	Directed by	Written by	Runtime	Original release date
0	"Killer"	Laurence Moody	Glenn Chandler	125 min.	6 September – 20 September 1983
A series of young blonde women are found strangled and left near water. Maryhill CID launch an investigation to find the person responsible for the murders. DCI Jim Taggart is asked to head the investigation, alongside new sergeant Peter Livingstone. Despite their differences, they must uncover the killer's identity before he strikes again. First appearance of DCI Jim Taggart (Mark McManus) and DS Peter Livingstone (Neil Duncan)

=== Series 1 (1985) ===
No.	Title	Directed by	Written by	Runtime	Original release date
1	"Dead Ringer"	Laurence Moody	Glenn Chandler	125 min.	2 July – 16 July 1985
The skeletal remains of a dismembered body are discovered beneath the floorboards of a house in Glasgow, but DCI Taggart and DS Livingstone find themselves sidetracked when the case takes an unexpected twist – a nine-month-old toddler is kidnapped from a multi-storey car park by an unknown assailant, followed by a ransom demand of £50,000.
2	"Murder in Season"	Peter Barber-Fleming	Glenn Chandler	125 min.	23 July – 6 August 1985
A famous opera singer is accused of murder when the body of her ex-husband's new girlfriend is found on the burnt out shell of his boat. DCI Taggart and DS Livingstone fall out when they come to different conclusions as to who is responsible for the murder. Livingstone suspects that DCI Taggart's judgment has been clouded by Eleanor's beauty. First appearance of Superintendent Jack McVitie (Iain Anders), and guest starring Isla Blair and Ken Stott

=== Series 2 (1986) ===
No.	Title	Directed by	Written by	Runtime	Original release date
3	"Knife-Edge"	Haldane Duncan	Glenn Chandler	125 min.	24 February – 10 March 1986
The discovery of a severed arm on the side of a busy motorway, followed by the discovery of a severed leg by a fisherman, leads DS Livingstone to investigate a murder in which the murderer is disposing of his victim piece by piece. Meanwhile, DCI Taggart is facing up to his demons at home, questioning whether his marriage is going to last. Alex Norton appears in this episode as murder suspect George Bryce, 16 years before playing DCI Matt Burke.
4	"Death Call"	Haldane Duncan	Glenn Chandler	125 min.	2 September – 16 September 1986
DCI Taggart and DS Livingstone are called in to investigate the macabre killing of the wife of a wealthy landowner who is found strangled and weighed down with luggage in a reservoir. Her husband was last seen preparing to go to Switzerland with a large sum of money in a holdall. But is the case as open and shut as DCI Taggart suspects? Guest starring Alan Cumming and Julie Graham

=== Series 3 (1987) ===
No.	Title	Directed by	Written by	Runtime	Original release date
5	"The Killing Philosophy"	Haldane Duncan	Glenn Chandler	125 min.	15 April – 29 April 1987
DCI Taggart and DS Livingstone investigate a failed rape attack by a masked attacker. The case becomes complicated when the victim commits suicide and the attacker strikes yet again; however, the attacker begins to change his MO by murdering his latest victim. Despite having a new Detective Constable on board, Taggart struggles to identify the motive for murder. First appearance of DC Michael Jardine (James MacPherson) and last appearance of DS Peter Livingstone (Neil Duncan) as main character
6	"Funeral Rites"	Alan Macmillan	Glenn Chandler	125 min.	9 September – 23 September 1987
The discovery of a charred corpse in a disused railway tunnel sets DCI Taggart on the gruesome hunt for a ruthless killer in an investigation with sinister undertones of black magic and voodoo. The arthritic wife of a dentist narrowly escapes a series of murder attempts, adding to a complex case for Taggart and Jardine, now a DS. Guest starring Annette Crosbie

=== Christmas Special (1987) ===
No.	Title	Directed by	Written by	Runtime	Original release date
7	"Cold Blood"	Haldane Duncan	Glenn Chandler	80 min.	31 December 1987
Feature-length single episode. A woman shoots her husband dead after discovering that he has been having an affair. DCI Taggart thinks he has the easiest case of his career; however, it soon becomes the complete opposite when the post mortem reveals that he was already dead before he was shot, and that his wife could not be responsible. Guest starring Diane Keen

=== Series 4 (1988) ===
No.	Title	Directed by	Written by	Runtime	Original release date
8	"Dead Giveaway"	Alan Macmillan	Glenn Chandler	125 min.	7 September – 21 September 1988
A young boy staggers home from a youth club after boxing practice, only to fall into a creek and drown. The grieving father is called in to identify the body and when he is driven home the police find his wife slumped in the hallway. Dr. Stephen Andrews discovers both victims died of rat poisoning and suspicion immediately falls on the husband.
9	"Root of Evil"	Peter Barber-Fleming	Glenn Chandler	125 min.	28 September – 12 October 1988
During the Glasgow Garden Festival the severed head of loan shark Willie Lomax is found in a blocked drain. He is but the first victim in what appears to be a serial killer taking out murderous revenge on loan sharks. Lomax's brother, his unhappy son, and the boy's stepfather, however, may provide clues to take the investigation in a different direction. Guest appearances by Celia Imrie and a young Joe McFadden

=== Christmas Special (1988) ===
No.	Title	Directed by	Written by	Runtime	Original release date
10	"Double Jeopardy"	Jim McCann	Glenn Chandler	78 min.	30 December 1988
Feature-length single episode. When the body of Rowena Bain is discovered in a wood, the forensic evidence suggests that Bain committed suicide, just as she was due to move to Germany with her family. DCI Taggart is suspicious, and he soon discovers that the victim's sister thinks that Rowena's husband, Maurice, is responsible for her murder. Co-production with Bayerischer Rundfunk

=== Series 5 (1989) ===
No.	Title	Directed by	Written by	Runtime	Original release date
11	"Flesh and Blood"	Alan Macmillan	Glenn Chandler	130 min.	5 September – 19 September 1989
DCI Taggart attends the wedding of social worker Jane Ross and former bank robber Charlie Forbes. Janie is later found murdered, having been crushed to death by a car. Meanwhile, a criminal hijacking a truck discovers more than he bargained for when he discovers a cache of explosives, and a chain of seemingly unrelated events begins.

=== New Year Special (1990) ===
No.	Title	Directed by	Written by	Runtime	Original release date
12	"Love Knot"	Peter Barber-Fleming	Glenn Chandler	90 min.	1 January 1990
Feature-length single episode. A body is dredged up from the bottom of the Clyde, which becomes the eighth body dredged up in the past twelve months. Forensics reveal that an ice pick was used to commit the murder. DCI Taggart and DS Jardine set off on an investigation which takes them way beyond Glasgow and into the Scottish Highlands. John Michie appears, 8 years before playing DI Robbie Ross in the series. Douglas Henshall appears.

=== Series 6 (1990) ===
No.	Title	Directed by	Written by	Runtime	Original release date
13	"Hostile Witness"	Haldane Duncan	Glenn Chandler and Stuart Hepburn	129 min.	1 March – 15 March 1990
A far-right political party seeking the return of capital punishment is embroiled in a series of murders during a by-election campaign, in which both the candidate and her agent become victims of the killer. DCI Taggart is pressed for a quick result, with strong media interest in the case and Supt. McVitie strapped for manpower. But to complicate matters further, Jean is also standing in the same by-election campaigning for disabled person's rights. Guest appearance from Robert Carlyle
14	"Evil Eye"	Haldane Duncan	Glenn Chandler	124 min.	4 September – 18 September 1990
The death of a policeman during an armed raid in London in which a number of diamond thieves managed to get away with a large haul, is traced back to Scotland as DCI Taggart and the team have to contend with a gypsy's curse. When the matriarch of a gypsy family is found murdered in her caravan, the case takes an unexpected twist. Guest appearances by John Hannah, Jill Gascoine, Maggie Bell, John McGlynn, David O'Hara, and Gary Webster
15	"Death Comes Softly"	Laurence Moody	Julian Jones	128 min.	3 December – 17 December 1990
When an elderly man is found brutally murdered in his home, DCI Taggart and DS Jardine suspect the daughter and her husband. Then another elderly person is murdered and the detectives struggle to find a connection. Eventually, a Post Office worker who also moonlights in a retirement home comes to their attention. WPC Jackie Reid joins the team. First 'official' appearance of WPC Jackie Reid (Blythe Duff)

=== Christmas Special (1990) ===
No.	Title	Directed by	Written by	Runtime	Original release date
16	"Rogues' Gallery"	Alan Macmillan	Stuart Hepburn	79 min.	31 December 1990
Feature-length single episode. When the gruesome remains of the body of a drug courier is found in the crushed remains of a car that has just been compacted in a scrapyard, DCI Taggart and DS Jardine are called to investigate. The grisly details are repeated shortly after when the body of an art dealer is found in the same scrapyard. Taggart and Jardine investigate an apparent link between drugs and the art world. Guest appearance by Peter Mullan

=== New Year Special (1992) ===
No.	Title	Directed by	Written by	Runtime	Original release date
17	"Violent Delights"	Alan Macmillan	Glenn Chandler	77 min.	1 January 1992
Feature-length single episode. When a sixth year student who is spying on his French teacher becomes the prime witness to her husband's murder, DCI Taggart, newly promoted DC Jackie Reid and DS Jardine have no choice but to exhume an entire graveyard when the prime suspect – an undertaker – refuses to let on where he has buried the parts of his mutilated body. Unfortunately, one of the deceased includes Jean Taggart's Aunt Hettie (much despised by Jim) – who also passes away in the episode and inconveniently interred by the same undertaker. Guest appearance by Ronald Fraser

=== Series 7 (1992) ===
No.	Title	Directed by	Written by	Runtime	Original release date
18	"Nest of Vipers"	Graham Theakston	Glenn Chandler	129 min.	9 January – 23 January 1992
Two skulls are found on the site of a by-pass road near Glasgow, and DCI Taggart believes it could be that of Janet Gilmour, a 19-year-old girl who disappeared without trace four years previously. Having become emotionally involved with the case and the victim's mother, he is eager to catch the person responsible and bring them to justice. Guest appearance by Ann Mitchell
19	"Double Exposure"	Gordon Flemying	Stuart Hepburn	130 min.	30 January – 13 February 1992
The chief suspect in a murder investigation has the perfect alibi – attendance at the Celtic v Rangers "Old Firm" derby. However, DCI Taggart is sure that he is responsible and is determined to prove his guilt. Meanwhile, a block of flats is the target of escalating racial attacks, and DS Jardine attempts to identify a link between them. Guest starring Jason Isaacs, Meera Syal and Deepak Verma

=== Series 8 (1992) ===
No.	Title	Directed by	Written by	Runtime	Original release date
20	"The Hit Man"	Mary McMurray	John Milne	131 min.	17 September – 1 October 1992
Taggart and Jardine are investigating the murder of hotel owner Tommy Catto, who was drugged while flying his private plane. He had been on a fishing trip with friends in the west of Scotland. The beneficiaries of his will are his daughter, Ailsa, and new wife, Mary. However, Mary has been having an affair with the hotel accountant.
21	"Ring of Deceit"	Mike Vardy	Stuart Hepburn	129 min.	8 October – 22 October 1992
Research scientist Julie Smith refuses an offer of help after her car fails to start outside a railway station. Her body is later discovered at the city rubbish dump. She is the latest victim in a series of assaults on women in South Glasgow, by an assailant known as 'The Mechanic', who disables his victim's cars – but the first to end in murder.

=== New Year's Special (1993) ===
No.	Title	Directed by	Written by	Runtime	Original release date
22	"Fatal Inheritance"	Alan Macmillan	Glenn Chandler	77 min.	1 January 1993
Feature-length single episode. DCI Taggart checks himself into a health farm to keep tabs on Dr. Janet Napier after a "not proven" verdict in the court case relating to the murder of her husband's lover. However, as more murders are committed Taggart must admit that even he might have been wrong about the good doctor's guilt. Guest starring Hannah Gordon, Francis Matthews and Henry Ian Cusick

=== Series 9 (1993) ===
No.	Title	Directed by	Written by	Runtime	Original release date
23	"Death Benefits"	Alan Bell	Barry Appleton	127 min.	16 February – 2 March 1993
Julia Fraser, wife of police sergeant John Fraser, is brutally murdered whilst he is on duty. During a search of his house, a list of names is found, and it appears that the names are related to a series of accidents. As the only connection between them is the list itself, DCI Taggart is left puzzled as to who is responsible.
24	"Gingerbread"	Sarah Hellings	Glenn Chandler	127 min.	20 April – 4 May 1993
While private detective Tom Barrow searches for missing businessman Philip Chalmers, he is savagely murdered in front of his son by an unknown assailant. Young Simon Barrow and his sister escape, and DS Jardine is first on the scene. Simon copes with his grief by playing detective, but his suspicions are ignored by both his foster parents and Jardine in this tale of storybook witchery. Guest appearances by Hugh Fraser and Vivien Heilbron
25	"Death Without Dishonour"	Alan Macmillan	Barry Appleton	127 min.	11 May – 25 May 1993
DCI Taggart and the team are made responsible for protecting witnesses involved in a "cab war" trial by Supt. McVitie, and as the trial continues, proceedings outside of the courtroom begin to escalate. However, it seems there may be a hidden agenda when the prosecuting advocate is found murdered and several other witnesses are attacked. Guest starring Peter O'Brien and Daniela Nardini
26	"Instruments of Justice"	Richard Holthouse	Russell Lewis	127 min.	30 September – 14 October 1993
Sean Brady has turned Queen's evidence against crime boss McLintock. On the way to court, his car is ambushed and a policeman is left seriously injured. Brady escapes and flees, leaving the prosecutor with a hole in his case against McLintock. DCI Taggart falls under suspicion because he authorized the route and Internal Affairs takes a hard-edged line

=== New Year's Special (1994) ===
No.	Title	Directed by	Written by	Runtime	Original release date
27	"Forbidden Fruit"	Mike Vardy	Glenn Chandler	102 min.	1 January 1994
Feature-length single episode. Joan Matheson arrives in Glasgow to be with her daughter who is expecting her first child. However, she reacts very badly when she learns the baby has been conceived by donor insemination. Shortly after she is found murdered and suspicion falls on her son in law whom she blamed and humiliated at a family meeting. Last appearance of DS Peter Livingstone (Alastair Duncan) and guest appearances by Phyllida Law and Sharon Small. First episode of Michael Jardine as Detective Inspector.

=== Series 10 (1994) ===
No.	Title	Directed by	Written by	Runtime	Original release date
28	"Secrets"	Marcus White	Stuart Hepburn	127 min.	6 October – 20 October 1994
Cameron Friel arrives in Glasgow to attend a literary award hosted by Prof Maggi McLeish. At the ceremony, Friel receives a bullet in an envelope, and Taggart investigates who the sender might be. Meanwhile, Jake Koslewski returns from a charity mission to Romania to discover his wife, an alcohol counsellor, has left him for George Proctor, a previous client. Guest appearances by Brian McCardie, Joe McFadden, and John McGlynn. Jackie Reid is promoted to Detective Sergeant.
29	"Hellfire"	Marcus White	Glenn Chandler	97 min.	27 October – 3 November 1994
James Martin is murdered on Walpurgis night with a chainsaw that involves witch-craft and Satanism. Detective Scott investigates his last case, but is unsuccessful in catching the prime suspect. At his retirement party, he collapses and asks Taggart bring those responsible to justice. Reid, working undercover, becomes convinced of her target's innocence. Colin McCredie appears, before joining the cast as DC Stuart Fraser. Guest appearances by Isla Blair, Ian Cairns, Bill Murdoch, and Greg Wise.

=== Series 11 (1995) ===
No.	Title	Directed by	Written by	Runtime	Original release date
30	"Prayer for the Dead"	Richard Holthouse	Barry Appleton	125 min.	11 January – 25 January 1995
Supt McVitie is taken to hospital with a heart attack after a heated argument with Taggart. His wife reacts very badly to Taggart's temporary promotion to Acting Superintendent, and takes it out on the whole team. Meanwhile, Reid and Jardine begin investigating the death of a drug addict, Scott Graham, who fell from a balcony during a drug fuelled party. Last appearance of DCI Jim Taggart (Mark McManus). Colin McCredie appears, before joining the cast as DC Stuart Fraser.
31	"Black Orchid"	Richard Holthouse	Glenn Chandler	90 min.	26 February 1995
A young girl who attends a hypnotist's show is found drowned shortly afterwards, leaving the hypnotist’s career in tatters. It appears to be an open and shut case, but was she secretly murdered? Meanwhile, DI Jardine and DS Reid investigate a series of killings that may have been carried out "to order". Features the funeral of DCI Jim Taggart. DC Stuart Fraser joins the team. First appearance of DC Stuart Fraser (Colin McCredie). Last appearance of Jean Taggart (Harriet Buchan). Guest starring Amanda Redman and Julian Glover
32	"Legends"	Alan Macmillan	Barry Appleton	125 min.	2 November – 16 November 1995
Jardine and Reid investigate a killing in a country house swimming pool. One of the victims is Rick Mulvey, former lead guitar of the 60s pop group, the Adders. Their vocalist died while on tour 25 years ago. Ian Garvey, Kate McCready's boyfriend is savagely beaten by two bouncers, and the following day, he is knocked down by DC Reid in her car.

=== Series 12 (1996) ===
No.	Title	Directed by	Written by	Runtime	Original release date
33	"Devil's Advocate"	Marcus White	Richard Maher	127 min.	4 January – 18 January 1996
34	"Angel Eyes"	Marcus White	Glenn Chandler	127 min.	21 March – 4 April 1996
When a musician is savagely murdered, DI Jardine and the team find themselves embracing the culture of the gay community. When a second murder is committed with the same MO, Jardine is forced to face his deep seated prejudices to uncover the truth behind the murders. DC Fraser realises his secret is no longer safe and is 'outed' by a former lover. Guest appearances by Ralph Riach, Duncan Duff, and Stuart Bowman.
35	"Dead Man's Chest"	Alan Macmillan	Richard Maher	129 min.	19 September – 3 October 1996

=== Series 13 (1997) ===
No.	Title	Directed by	Written by	Runtime	Original release date
36	"Apocalypse"	Marcus White	Glenn Chandler	125 min.	16 January – 30 January 1997
A series of bizarre murders of opponents and ex-members of a religious cult have the team baffled. Each murder follows the Biblical plagues of Egypt, which according to the Book of Revelation will precede Armageddon. There are more than fifty members of the cult, most of whom would kill if asked to do so by the cult leader, David Burns. Who is responsible for that?
37	"Babushka"	Derek Lister	Robert Smith	125 min.	4 September – 18 September 1997
The murder of a wealthy local businessman leads DI Jardine and the team to investigate an agency involved in supplying mail order brides and women to order. As Glasgow takes on somewhat of a 'Russian Flavour', Jardine, Reid and Fraser attempt to uncover the mystery involving the Anastasia Agency and who is responsible for the businessman's murder.

=== Series 14 (1998) ===
No.	Title	Directed by	Written by	Runtime	Original air date	UK viewers (millions)
38	"Berserker"	Richard Holthouse	Phil Ford	125 min.	1 January – 15 January 1998	TBA
Illegal body building drugs combined with mind bending additives are discovered to be responsible for a series of gym-related deaths in Glasgow. In a race against time to find the source of the drugs, DCI Jardine and the team call on the help of a famous chemistry professor at the University. But is he assisting with the investigation or is he the source?
39	"Out of Bounds"	Sarah Hellings	Glenn Chandler	105 min.	1 March 1998	TBA
A school master is beaten to death with a cricket bat by an unknown assailant. 60 years later, the body is found by students on a cross country run. Douglas Flemming identifies the bones as Friedrich Zwanziger, a strict disciplinarian who disappeared while collecting beetles. As the investigation proceeds, McVitie discloses that he is on the board of governors.
40	"Dead Reckoning"	Alan Macmillan	Richard Maher	125 min.	15 July – 29 July 1998	8.03; 7.55; 8.21
Barbara Hancock is brutally murdered in the car park outside a plush hotel. While Jardine and Reid are investigating, Fraser assists a distraught Peter Letham to find his missing wife who has not been seen for three days. Jardine and Reid discover their victim was working as an escort. Meanwhile, Letham's employer starts acting suspiciously. Last appearance of Superintendent Jack McVitie (Iain Anders)
41	"A Few Bad Men"	Richard Holthouse	Julian Spilsbury	125 min.	8 October – 22 October 1998	8.66; 7.58; 7.92
Last serialized episode. A soldier is murdered while doing his rounds at night. Jardine and Sergeant Tom Renshaw set out to solve the case. Renshaw is a rather unpleasant character who abuses his men rather than question them. Meanwhile, new DI Robbie Ross and Fraser are investigating counterfeiters at a race meeting, after a horse disappears. First episode with Michael Jardine as Detective Chief Inspector First appearance of DI Robbie Ross (John Michie)
42	"Long Time Dead"	Danny Hiller	Steve Griffiths	105 min.	1 November 1998	10.29
Feature-length special. DCI Jardine is hosting the Strathclyde CID Dinner at the Crawford Hotel when the body of the owner is found strangled and dumped in the back lane. A kitchen hand who was behaving strangely immediately becomes the prime suspect. However, he, too, is murdered before he can be interviewed, as is the head chef.

=== Series 15 (1999) ===
No.	Title	Directed by	Written by	Runtime	Original release date	UK viewers (millions)
43	"Bloodlines"	Alan Macmillan	Glenn Chandler	105 min.	16 January 1999	6.94
After serving a life sentence for the murder of a family of five when she was just sixteen, Susan Keller is released from prison. However, shortly after her release, members of her own family begin to die mysteriously. Suspecting that a revenge attack may be on the cards, DCI Jardine attempts to discover who would want to carry out such attacks. Last story written by Taggart creator Glenn Chandler
44	"A Fistful of Chips"	Alan Macmillan	Mark Greig	105 min.	7 September 1999	8.66
Esther Kennedy's body falls from an overpass and lands on the roof of her boyfriend's car. The autopsy reveals that she died from a blow to the head and was dead before she fell. The investigation leads the team to a computer chip company where staff are behaving very strangely. Not the least being Paul Kennedy, the victim's husband.
45	"Fearful Lightning"	Michael Brayshaw	Steve Griffiths	105 min.	21 October 1999	8.54
Martin Strange is conducting a clairvoyant service when he is interrupted by Lenny Kerr, an angry young man who accuses him of fraud. After the service Karen Lennox is electrocuted by what appears to be a lightning strike. At first, the team dismiss the death as an unfortunate accident. However, a second death turns up some unusual information.
46	"For Their Sins"	Danny Hiller	Danny McCahon	105 min.	21 November 1999	9.60
Paddy Lapsley is found dead on the stairs of a tenement building, the victim of a drug overdose. Dr. Andrews determines the victim was murdered. Suspicion falls on Sean Boyle, who has taken over the project as the local distributor. When he is murdered in a similar way, Rosie Lewis makes a name for herself as the vigilante mother.

=== Series 16 (2000) ===
No.	Title	Directed by	Written by	Runtime	Original release date	UK viewers (millions)
47	"Ghost Rider"	Michael Brayshaw	Richard Mayer	105 min.	16 February 2000	9.36
A charred body is dragged from the Clyde and identified as DCI Blair MacDonald. Suspicion immediately falls on James Dillon, who has just been released from prison after serving a life sentence for murder. Dillon swore revenge on MacDonald for putting him away. The team soon discover that Patricia Dillon is seeking a retrial to prove her father's innocence.
48	"Skin Deep"	Michael Brayshaw	Nick Doughty	105 min.	14 September 2000	7.25
David Grant is found lying in a pool of blood at the local health club. Nikki Jones, with whom the victim has been having an affair, accuses another member of attempted murder. The investigation leads Jardine to Glena Bennett, who appears to be dealing in illegal diet tablets. When she is found dead in her own home, it is determined she was murdered.
49	"Wavelength"	Danny Hiller	Mark Greig	105 min.	21 September 2000	8.14
Robin Murray returns home to discover his wife has been brutally murdered. Jardine and the team follow the usual leads. The celebrity who has been dumped to make way for the rising star is a natural suspect; a frequent caller who appears to be stalking the grieving husband is, too. Events take a nasty turn when Murray's panel operator is murdered.
50	"Football Crazy"	Ian Knox	Peter Mills	105 min.	28 September 2000	8.53
Reid and her fiancé enjoy their day off watching football. After the match, the referee is found dead from a heart attack. His body has been laid out with a red card in his hand. Dr. Andrews finds he is the victim of disrespect rather than foul play. Sir Archie Drummond, an influential board member, is found crushed beneath a car a few days later.

=== New Year's Special (2001) ===
No.	Title	Directed by	Written by	Runtime	Original release date	UK viewers (millions)
51	"Falling in Love"	Danny Hiller	Brian McGill	105 min.	10 January 2001	8.73
Davie O'Connor is taking his first parachute jump with members from his local tango club. When the chute fails to open, he plummets to a grisly death. DCI Jardine discovers the line was cut, but also that the victim had terminal cancer. Suspicion immediately falls on Marie Doherty, his fiancée who now stands to inherit a lot of money. Last appearance of Pathologist Dr Stephen Andrews (Robert Robertson)

=== Series 17 (2002) ===
No.	Title	Directed by	Written by	Runtime	Original release date	UK viewers (millions)
52	"Death Trap"	Ian Madden	Stuart Hepburn	105 min.	14 January 2002	7.28
Johnny Innes, son of local politician Malcolm, is shot dead after interrupting one of his father's council meetings. Jardine clashes with Malcolm Innes and is taken off the case – but pursues his own line of enquiry. Embittered Liam Kennedy is a qualified sniper and therefore becomes a major suspect, especially as he has a grudge. First appearance of DCI Matthew Burke (Alex Norton) and last appearance of DCI Mike Jardine (James MacPherson)
53	"Fire, Burn"	Mike Alexander	John Brown	105 min.	21 January 2002	7.27
A charred corpse is found in the burnt out remains of a clothing factory. Scott Dewar, owner of a rival factory, is the immediate suspect – but Maureen Wishart reports her husband Derek missing, and he not only worked for Dewar, but had a knowledge of explosives. Meanwhile, DS Reid finds DCI Burke a little too hard to handle after Mike Jardine's death.
54	"Watertight"	Brian Kelly	Michael Jenner	105 min.	8 July 2002	7.11
When teenaged prostitute Dee is found murdered, Robbie goes gunning for Willie Strachan, a man whom he has long suspected of being involved in sex trafficking. However, he is not the only suspect, as law student Craig Colhoune, son of a widowed sheriff who dotes on him, also finds himself in the vicinity with unexplained blood on his sleeve.
55	"The Friday Event"	Ian Madden	Ann-Marie Di Mambro	105 min.	15 July 2002	6.27
55	"The Friday Event"	Ian Madden	Ann-Marie Di Mambro	105 min.	16 July 2002	6.56
Two-part special. The apparent suicide of a sixth former at an elite boys' school turns into a murder enquiry and a journalist, much to the headmaster's displeasure, publishes an article linking the boy to drug-dealing before he, too, is murdered. A third body indicates a serial killer and the manner of the murders leads to a famous painter.

=== Series 18 (2002–03) ===
No.	Title	Directed by	Written by	Runtime	Original release date	UK viewers (millions)
56	"Hard Man"	Ian Madden	Michael Jenner	60 min.	14 December 2002	7.35
A dock worker is called out to a meeting where he is knocked unconscious, and later, his body is found mangled in a piece of machinery. A payslip identifies the victim as Iain Wilson. Suspicion falls on Budge Kirwell, the brother of Dee Kirwell, the victim's girlfriend. He had both motive and opportunity to commit murder – but is he responsible?
57	"Fade to Black"	Brian Kelly	John Brown	60 min.	21 December 2002	7.87
A young nurse is found strangled in her home, with no sign of forced entry and two glasses of wine on the table. On finding a large quantity of cash hidden in her flat and signs of an affluent lifestyle, Burke and the team begin to suspect that the murder victim had a secret double life. Meanwhile, Burke is being secretly filmed with a camcorder.
58	"Blood Money"	Brian Kelly	Martin McCardie	60 min.	28 December 2002	7.03
A boxing promoter is found strangled with wads of bank notes stuffed in his mouth. Successful fighter Andy Corbett was having an affair with Elaine, the victim's widow and the ringside doctor, Dr. Heron, has also been behaving suspiciously in trying to get rid of the boxers' medical record. However, the motive appears to stem from fight fixing.
59	"New Life"	Andy Goddard	Robert Fraser	60 min.	4 January 2003	7.01
A top research scientist is blown up in his car, having arrived in Glasgow to address a medical conference. There has been opposition to his research and this is where the investigation initially leads as Burke and the team investigate possible motives. However, it soon comes to light that there are others within the scientific community who could benefit from his murder.
60	"Bad Blood"	Andy Goddard	Michael Jenner	60 min.	11 January 2003	5.73
A Kurdish taxi driver is murdered, and the team are joined by D.S. Fairchild, who is experienced in racially motivated crimes. Whilst the rest of the team warm to her, Burke is peeved as he believes that political correctness is hampering the course of the enquiry, particularly as no-one seems any closer to establishing a motive.
61	"Halfway House"	Ian Madden	Stuart Hepburn	60 min.	18 January 2003	6.93
When an anonymous victim is shot dead in a local park, the only clue to identify him is a library card for a city college. This in turn leads to a half-way house for recently released criminals, some of whom are known to the team. Unfortunately, the hostel warden is not keen to cooperate, and the team face a hard time in identifying the victim.
62	"An Eye for an Eye"	Patrick Harkins	Stuart Hepburn	120 min.	25 January 2003	6.92
TV Movie special. When a doctor at a clinic for women which advocates birth control is murdered, the immediate suspects are a militant fundamentalist group who oppose abortions. However, drug links between the clinic and a local crime boss extend the scope of the investigation, though Stuart believes the murderer may have a more personal reason.

=== Series 19 (2003–04) ===
No.	Title	Directed by	Written by	Runtime	Original release date	UK viewers (millions)
63	"Penthouse and Pavement"	Patrick Harkins	Robert Fraser	90 min.	7 October 2003	6.88
A famous novelist is found murdered in an alley the morning after a prestigious book launch, and DCI Burke's team's only lead is a drugged and confused prostitute. As the team explore a number of possibilities, Fraser and Reid find the victim enjoyed a secret life amid Glasgow's sleazy underworld which may have led to murder.
64	"Atonement"	Morag Fullarton	Julie Dixon	90 min.	3 December 2003	7.38
Billy McCree is murdered in his workshop, and his severed hand is found next to him. The obvious suspect is Jim Naysmith, just out of jail after a twenty year stretch. Burke investigates the Naysmith gang, whilst Robbie is flattered when Mary, a young law student, asks to shadow him. Gemma, however, believes that Mary may have an ulterior motive.
65	"Compensation"	Alan Macmillan	Mike Cullen	90 min.	30 April 2004	6.47
The team travels to rural Fenmore after a farmer is suspiciously killed in a house fire but finds few clues, and the villagers unwilling to offer any information. An investigation that combines politics, local history, and murder to devastating effect proves less than simple for Burke and the team, as they attempt to piece together the evidence.
66	"Saints and Sinners"	Patrick Harkins	Chris Dolan	90 min.	30 December 2004	7.00
When lawyer Richard Flett is shot dead, suspicion initially falls on his widow Adele and his partner Charlie Muir, who were having an affair. However, when Muir is also murdered, Burke uncovers a wholly different motive. A group of residents was taking a company called Arcadia to court on the grounds that they had caused pollution, leading to illness. Guest appearance by Gareth Thomas.

=== Series 20 (2005) ===
No.	Title	Directed by	Written by	Runtime	Original release date	UK viewers (millions)
67	"Puppet on a String"	Morag Fullarton	Julie Dixon	90 min.	6 January 2005	6.69
Hospital Dr. Mellor is attacked by a masked assailant carrying a syringe full of lethal drugs, but manages to survive the attack. He points the finger at rival doctor Thomas Finn, but Finn has an alibi. The next day, Mellor is found dead, but again Finn has a cast-iron alibi. Was Mellor correct in his suspicions? Or is Finn in fact entirely innocent?
68	"The Wages of Sin"	Alan Macmillan	James McIntyre	90 min.	13 January 2005	6.36
The Houston family are returning from a funeral when they discover the body of a taxi driver in his car outside the family business. Burke investigates and discovers a link between the victim and the daughter who has just been buried after an overdose. Suspicion falls on the father, Davie Houston, who appears to be involved in money laundering.
69	"The Ties that Bind"	Patrick Harkins	Stuart Hepburn	90 min.	20 January 2005	6.16
Burke's professional life is left hanging in the balance after the body of a librarian is found behind the wheel of a car in the Clyde after an apparent hit and run. The detectives are baffled – it appears that the victim had been tied up and was already dead before the car hit the water. But certain allegations are made about Burke which hinder the investigation?
70	"In Camera"	Ian Madden	John Brown	90 min.	27 January 2005	6.26
Robbie is all set to spend a romantic weekend with his new lady love Eve Hamilton. Unfortunately, the mood is soured when the corpse of a young man, a photographic assistant, is discovered at the romantic hideaway. Investigating the boy's death and subsequent others, Robbie begins to discover that Eve is perhaps not as innocent as she would appear.
71	"Mind Over Matter"	Morag Fullarton	Chris Dolan	90 min.	3 February 2005	6.21
When the body of 21-year-old medical student Amy Penn is found by children in a park, the team prepares themselves for a difficult investigation. Heavy rain has destroyed any evidence of her killer, but strangely her body has been sculpted in death into a childlike pose with her thumb in her mouth. Initial enquiries uncover few leads.

=== Series 21 (2005) ===
No.	Title	Directed by	Written by	Runtime	Original release date	UK viewers (millions)
72	"Cause and Effect"	Patrick Harkins	Daniel Boyle	60 min.	16 September 2005	5.76
73	"A Taste of Money"	Morag Fullarton	Charlie Fletcher	90 min.	23 September 2005	6.35
When a caustic restaurant critic is found murdered, suspicion falls on the thief who fled the scene at the time of his death. But could a chef with a score to settle be the real culprit? Burke and the team find themselves becoming immersed in the world of culinary rivalry, which as they discover, turns out to be a very seedy and dark world. Guest starring Struan Rodger
74	"A Death Foretold"	James Henry	John Brown	90 min.	30 September 2005	6.57
When the body of a student is discovered in an alleyway, a bloodstained leaflet at the scene is traced back to a nearby church. Could the parish priest be involved in the student's murder? As the team finds themselves investigating a very shady side of religion, a link to the past could prove to be the key to identify the person responsible. Guest starring Sean McGinley and Sara Vickers
75	"Running Out of Time"	Ian Madden	Stuart Hepburn	90 min.	4 November 2005	6.03
Burke is enjoying his holiday when suddenly he is shot in the neck by a sniper. Meanwhile, Robbie and Stuart are asked to identify the body of a colleague – DC Meads, who has been shot dead inside his house. The investigation leads them to Stevie Dixon, a small-time criminal who has threatened to kill Meades for arresting him on charges of forgery.
76	"Cause to Kill"	James Henry	Martin McCardie	90 min.	11 November 2005	6.65
Burke investigates a copycat killing inspired by a murder committed 20 years ago. With the help of a forensic psychologist and author, Irene Russell, he attempts to solve the case before the killer claims more victims. As the case continues, it appears that the ultimate target may be someone who is directly at the heart of the investigation.
77	"Do or Die"	Morag Fullarton	Mike Cullen	90 min.	9 December 2005	5.45
Following a poor career appraisal, Robbie aims to redeem himself by going undercover at an army base where a young private died in suspicious circumstances. It is a brutal regime, exemplified by the sadistic Sergeant Kent, but there are two further deaths, both of instructors known for their harsh treatment of the new recruits.
78	"Dead Man Walking"	Alan Macmillan	Julie Dixon	90 min.	16 December 2005	5.67
The team investigates the seemingly motiveless murder of a mechanic who is found dead in his garage. Suspicion soon falls on his business partner, Tony Benton, but it turns out that Benton was in fact the intended victim of the crime, and thus, the investigation turns towards the possible motives that people could have for killing Benton.

=== Series 22 (2006) ===
No.	Title	Directed by	Written by	Runtime	Original release date	UK viewers (millions)
79	"Law"	Ian Madden	Mike Cullen	90 min.	22 March 2006	5.91
A teenage girl is last seen wandering through a fairground at 2am in the fog, and the next day, her strangled body is found under a pile of rubbish. The investigation leads the team to the local carnival, where Burke takes an aggressive stance against the gypsies. Fraser reacts by trying to understand and relate to the itinerant workers to win their trust. Guest appearances by David Bradley, Ron Donachie, Andrew Lee Potts and Kathryn Howden.
80	"The Best and the Brightest"	James Henry	Robert Fraser	90 min.	29 March 2006	6.04
Haemotology student Mia Hassan is murdered in her lab when she inhales something which induces a severe anaphylactic shock. The only clue to her social life is a man called Luke, allegedly in Seattle, with whom she exchanged e-mails. Pushy media student Jessica Flowers seems to have known Mia better than she claimed, but she is later found dead. Guest starring Maimie McCoy

=== Series 23 (2007) ===
No.	Title	Directed by	Written by	Runtime	Original release date	UK viewers (millions)
81	"Users and Losers"	Ian Madden	Mike Cullen	68 min.	3 January 2007	5.54
A gambler is kicked to death in a back street in Glasgow. When the team searches his house, they find £50,000 under the floorboards. The serial numbers lead them to a bank robbery which netted 300,000. Further investigation leads Burke to a stable run by Penny and James Forsyth. The team believes the couple is part of a money-laundering scheme. Guest appearances by Ronan Vibert and Pandora Clifford.
82	"The Thirteenth Step"	Justin Molotnikov	Robert Fraser	68 min.	17 January 2007	5.70
Ex-con Eddie Monroe is found stabbed in a Govan alleyway. Burke meets Angus Ford – a retired police officer who was responsible for Monroe's arrest and subsequent convictions – who remains adamant that Monroe was a bad man who deserved to die. But who was his killer? All roads keep leading back to old acquaintance Daniel Tulloch and his family.
83	"Tenement"	James Henry	Paul Logue	69 min.	30 April 2007	4.48
An activist is found garroted in her own home, and suspicion turns to a property developer, Charlie McEwan, who wants to tear down the building and put up luxury towers. As more people are found murdered with links to the property developer, Ross is investigating a different hit and run accident, whilst falling in love with the victim's sister.
84	"Pinnacle"	Mike Alexander	Tony Philpott	69 min.	4 July 2007	5.51
A man jogging through a park stumbles on the mutilated body of Tina Brogan, the CEO of Pinnacle Enterprise. Initial investigations lead to the estranged husband who does not have an alibi for the night. Frank Harris is also in the frame when he discloses that his mother has been cheated out of her home by Pinnacle Enterprise.

=== Series 24 (2008) ===
No.	Title	Directed by	Written by	Runtime	Original release date	UK viewers (millions)
85	"Genesis"	Ian Madden	Chris Dolan	90 min.	8 January 2008	4.82
The team investigates two murders associated with a fertility clinic and a church group protesting at the clinic.
86	"Judgement Day"	Patrick Harkins	Mike Cullen	60 min.	15 January 2008	5.24
The death of DCI Burke's elderly father leaves him searching for answers.
87	"Island"	James Henry	Robert Fraser	60 min.	27 February 2008	5.60
A mutilated body is discovered on a remote island.
88	"Trust"	Ian Madden	Ian Madden	60 min.	21 April 2008	5.23
The body of a hitman who has been tortured and executed is found on wasteland. Burke's old flame, who left him at the altar decades ago, is now a political consultant. She asks him to make a back-channel investigation into her primary client, an MSP. Burke gets embroiled in a side investigation with links to the gangland murder. Guest appearances by Phyllis Logan and Neil McKinven.
89	"A Study in Murder"	Morag Fullarton	Stuart Hepburn	60 min.	1 May 2008	3.81
A college principal is found crushed to death in the lift shaft.
90	"Point of Light"	Patrick Harkins	Paul Logue	60 min.	5 June 2008	4.93
A private investigator is found lying dead at the bottom of a quarry. Guest appearances by Donald Sumpter and Julie Wilson Nimmo.

=== Series 25 (2008) ===
No.	Title	Directed by	Written by	Runtime	Original release date	UK viewers (millions)
91	"Safer"	Ian Madden	Mike Cullen	60 min.	3 November 2008	5.26
A female campaigner for domestic violence is found battered to death in an alleyway. During the course of the investigation, the men, that the campaigner was pursuing, enter the frame. But the real culprit is lying in plain sight.
92	"The Caring Game"	James Henry	Michael Jenner	90 min.	14 November 2008	3.93
A young woman is found dead in her bath after a week. But which side of her shady life led to her murder? Meanwhile Robbie's personal life takes an unexpected upsetting turn.
93	"Homesick"	Patrick Harkins	Robert Fraser	60 min.	8 December 2008	5.30
Is there a darker and politically motivated scheme at work behind the hit-like murders of two Polish migrants, a construction site's security guard and a luxury hotel's receptionist, and a petrol bomb attack against a lawyer of Polish origin? Or is someone laying a smokescreen across the team's path? The truth turns out to be unexpectedly much closer to home. Guest stars: Gary Lewis and Brian McCardie
94	"Crossing the Line"	Morag Fullarton	Mike Cullen	60 min.	15 December 2008	6.18
The discovery of skeletons in an old mine shaft in Glasgow opens a murder investigation and ghosts from the past come back to haunt the local community.
95	"Lifeline"	Ian Madden	Robert Fraser	90 min.	30 December 2008	5.16
A volunteer at a suicide hotline is murdered, with the murder staged to look like a suicide. Jackie is the target of a stalker. Eventually, it turns out the two cases are linked with two other murders.

=== Series 26 (2009) ===
No.	Title	Directed by	Written by	Runtime	Original release date	UK viewers (millions)
96	"Cold Reader"	Adrian McDowall	Dominic Morgan and Matt Harvey	60 min.	20 February 2009	5.97
When a young uni student is abducted, a woman with special powers approaches the team with some clues as to the student's whereabouts. Burke is very dismissive of this woman but how much can she actually help the investigation?
97	"Grass"	Ian Madden	David Kane	60 min.	30 April 2009	4.63
One of Robbie's informants is found dead in a park. The informant snitches on a well known gangster, but how much is this gangster connected with the investigation.
98	"The Knife Trick"	Patrick Harkins	Stephen Brady	60 min.	7 May 2009	4.73
A college professor is stabbed to death in an experiment gone wrong. There is an initial suspect but the real culprit hides very well.
99	"So Long Baby"	Morag Fullarton	Morag Fullarton	60 min.	19 July 2009	4.49
Robbie is ready to go on holidays but an abandoned baby says otherwise. But what has the baby to do with the burglary and murder case the team is investigating?
100	"Fact and Fiction"	Ian Madden	Ian Madden	60 min.	24 December 2009	4.53
Three years earlier Jimmy Melville's corpse was found floating in a river. His mobile phone was sold on eBay and at one time had been in the company of Mark Joffe, a part-time English lecturer and crime writer, whose new novel 'Chaos' describes a murder identical to Melville's. He is an arrogant, evasive interviewee but he once had an affair with an Anne Scoular, to whom he was violent and threatening after she left him for Jimmy Melville. This gives Burke's team an opening, as does the cooperation of an older female colleague spurned by Joffe. 100th episode of Taggart (the pilot, "Killer", not considered)

=== Series 27 (2010) ===
No.	Title	Directed by	Written by	Runtime	Original release date	UK viewers (millions)
101	"IOU"	Mike Alexander	Robert Fraser	60 min.	18 July 2010	5.49
Bank clerk Craig Williams is murdered at the dog-track, where, for a change, he would have won – forty-five grand. Evidence suggests that the race was fixed and the favourite dog nobbled. Had Craig lived he would have claimed his winnings from bookie Niall McShane and his violent son Ged, who threatens the trainer. But then Ged McShane is killed in the same way as Craig. An ex-wife who stood to gain from Craig's life insurance and a married colleague with whom he had a fling while her husband was abroad are now in the frame alongside the bookie and the trainer.
102	"Local Hero"	Adrian McDowall	Mike Cullen	60 min.	25 July 2010	4.27
A body is found hanging from the swing frame in the playground on the recently rejuvenated Allerdykes Estate by the head of the local 'Community Watch' with a checkered past doing his early morning check.
103	"The Rapture"	Patrick Harkins	David Kane	60 min.	1 August 2010	4.32
Edward Muir and his son Luke, members of the austere Triune Family religious group, are brutally murdered with open bibles by the corpses, referring to the Rapture or promise of eternal life. Karen, the young daughter of Jackie's friend Eileen, is also murdered and a bible found by her body. Karen's lap-top shows that she was dating Luke Muir, against his religion's rules. The group leader's family comes under suspicion when his wife and younger son reveal they want to leave the Triune Family as Luke did and the other son puts up opposition to their wishes. The last appearance of Colin McCredie as DC Stuart Fraser.
104	"Bad Medicine"	Bill Anderson	David Kane	60 min.	3 October 2010 (Note: Air date for STV. ITV aired on 11 January 2011)	3.47
Newly qualified doctor Scott Clarkson is found tortured and murdered in an empty warehouse. Two London detectives, Moretti and Casey, the latter an old friend of Burke, arrive in Glasgow whilst investigating a similar case though Jackie and Robbie do not warm to them. Scott's girlfriend Lucy, another medic, is arrested for manufacturing recreational drugs and admits that Scott also made and sold Ecstasy to pay his student fees. Lucy is arrested and commits suicide in custody after a visit from the London policemen. Were Jackie and Robbie right to be suspicious of the visitors' motives? This series is being aired first on STV, in multi-camera set-up & HD for the first time, and introduces the supporting characters of Chief Supt. Karen Campbell (Siobhan Redmond), and Pathologist Duncan Clark (Davood Ghadami). The unit also moves from Maryhill to the City Centre.
105	"Abuse of Trust"	Bill Anderson	Steve Lightfoot	60 min.	10 October 2010 (Note: Air date for STV. ITV aired on ITV: 18 January 2011)	3.35
When union leader for ship workers Will Ramsey is shot dead it looks to be an open and shut case that it is a corporate killing, but the real motivation and implications lay closer to home.
106	"Silent Truth"	Jean Stewart	David Kane	60 min.	17 October 2010 (Note: Air date for STV. ITV aired on 25 January 2011)	Under 2.94
When an Iranian refugee is found burnt to death, it appears at first to be a racially motivated crime. It soon becomes clear to DCI Burke and the rest of the team that there is another motive and when a drug dealer enters the frame, the case is set to be extremely complex for all concerned. First appearance Anneika Rose as DC Mita Rahim.
107	"Fallen Angels"	Jean Stewart	Lena Rae	60 min.	24 October 2010 (Note: Air date for STV. ITV aired on 1 February 2011)	Under 3.70
When the team is called to a flat, they discover three children all dead with a fourth named Callum fighting for his life, DI Ross then discovers the dead body of the children's father Pete in the bathroom, he, therefore, becomes the prime suspect but then when forensic tests reveal that Pete died before his own children. The real culprit is still at large and shocks all of the team. Guest star: Neve McIntosh.
108	"Bloodsport"	Douglas Mackinnon	Declan Croghan	60 min.	31 October 2010 (Note: Air date for STV. ITV aired on ITV: 8 February 2011)	3.56
After the badly beaten body of a man is found dumped on a motorway underpass, his murder is linked to a Fight Club style, bare-knuckle boxing venue. Both professional and personal lives collide at Maryhill CID, with one of the detectives having to come face to face with their own demons.
109	"The Ends of Justice"	Douglas Mackinnon	David Kane	60 min.	7 November 2010 (Note: Air date for STV. ITV aired on 22 February 2011)	3.33
When a busker is fatally stabbed in Glasgow city centre, the newly-promoted DI Jackie Reid heads up the investigation. Mita Rahim joins the Maryhill CID team properly while DI Ross suffers a personal heartache.
