= Simone Lahbib =

Scottish actress (born 1965)

- Born: Simone Nicole Jean Lahbib Ould Cheikl; 6 February 1965 (age 61); Stirling, Scotland
- Education: Queen Margaret University
- Occupation: Actress
- Years active: 1985–present
- Notable work: Bad Girls; London Bridge; Wire in the Blood; EastEnders
- Spouse: Raffaello Degruttola (m. 2003)
- Children: Skye Degruttola

Simone Nicole Jean Lahbib Ould Cheikl (/ləˈbiːb/; born 6 February 1965) is a Scottish actress. She is known for her roles as Helen Stewart in the ITV drama series Bad Girls, DCI Alex Fielding in the ITV crime series Wire in the Blood and Katy Lewis in the BBC soap opera EastEnders.

== Life and career ==
Lahbib was born in Stirling to a Scottish poet and artist mother and a French-Algerian chef father. Lahbib trained in Drama at Edinburgh’s Queen Margaret University. She then commenced her on-screen career in 1985 when she was cast in The Girl in the Picture, a film set in Glasgow directed by Cary Parker. She also sang on the soundtrack. Lahbib has worked extensively in television and film, after starting her career predominantly in theatre. Following guest appearances on well-known television dramas such as Taggart and Dangerfield, she received her first leading role when she was cast in the ITV daytime drama London Bridge as Mary O'Connor, from 1996 to 1997. Her next role in 1997 was in the third and final series of police drama Thief Takers where she met her future husband, Raffaello Degruttola. This was followed by her appearance in the 6-part comedy series The Young Person's Guide to Becoming a Rock Star in 1998. In 1999, Lahbib became widely recognised for her leading role in the cult British prison drama series Bad Girls, in which she played Helen Stewart.

Following her departure from Bad Girls, Lahbib has had leading roles in several TV drama series including Family as Jacqueline Cutler, Fallen as DCI Kate Gunning, Single-Handed as Gemma Burge, Monarch of the Glen as Isobel Anderson and crime drama series Wire in the Blood as DCI Alex Fielding. She appeared in this last role from series four to series six. She also featured in Da Vinci's Demons as Laura Cereta, The Loch as Mhari Toner and as Debbie O'Callaghan in A Confession.

In 2005, Lahbib appeared in Red Mercury, a feature film with Stockard Channing, and has frequently appeared in films since, such as the award-winning Philomena, with Judi Dench, Wayland's Song, Film: The Movie (which she co-produced), and Burning Men, on which she was also co-casting director. She also appeared in the independent feature film Transference in 2020, which was written and directed by her husband. In 2017, Lahbib opened her second part-time performing arts school, London Arts Academy in North London. The school teaches singing, dancing and acting to children ages 5–18 years. In September 2020, it was announced that she had joined the cast of the BBC soap opera EastEnders. She made her debut appearance as Katy Lewis in November of that year.

In 2025, she joined the cast of River City as Vivienne Barton.

== Personal life ==
Lahbib married British-Italian actor Raffaello Degruttola on 10 May 2003 in her hometown of Stirling, Scotland. In October 2005, she gave birth to their daughter, Skye Lucia Degruttola, who also became an actress. In 2010 Lahbib established the Eilidh Brown Memorial Fund in honour of her niece who died of cancer on 25 March 2010, nine days before her 16th birthday. The charity fund will benefit children with cancer and their families.

== Filmography ==
Film

Year	Title	Role	Directed by	Notes
1985	The Girl in the Picture	The Girl	Cary Parker	
1996	The Witches Daughter	Zelda	Alan Macmillan	
2005	Red Mercury	Janet	Roy Battersby	
2013	Philomena	Kate Sixsmith	Stephen Frears	
2013	Wayland's Song	June	Richard Jobson	
2014	Flim: The Movie	Alex Kingston	Raffaello Degruttola	Additionally served as co-producer and producer in "making of"
2019	Burning Men	Eduarda	Jeremy Wooding	
2020	Transference: A Bipolar Love Story	Sophie	Raffaello Degruttola	Additionally served as co-producer
TBA	Detour	Astrid Petruce	David Goodall	

Television

Year	Title	Role	Notes
1992	Taggart	Caroline Peterson	Series 7, Episode 1 – "Nest of Vipers"
1994	Crime Story	Monika Stedul	Series 2, Episode 5 – "Stedul: The Yugoslav Hitman"
1995	Taggart	Sarah Stevenson	Series 11, Episode 1 – "Prayer for the Dead"
1996	Dangerfield	Joanne Elland	Series 3, Episode 10 – "Inside Out"
1996	The Witch's Daughter	Zelda	Television film
1996–1997	London Bridge	Mary O'Connor	Series 1 & 2 – 58 episodes
1997–1998	Thief Takers	DC Lucy McCarthy	Series 3 – 8 episodes
1998	The Young Person's Guide to Becoming a Rock Star	Fiona Johnstone	6 episodes
1999–2001	Bad Girls	Helen Stewart	Leading role Series 1–3 – 31 episodes
2002	Judge John Deed	Carol Hayman	Series 2, Episode 2 – "Abuse of Power"; Series 2, Episode 3 – "Nobody's Fool"
2003	Family	Jacqueline Cutler	TV mini-series
2004	Fallen	DCI Kate Gunning	Television film
2004	Monarch of the Glen	Isobel Anderson	Series 6 – 10 episodes
2005	Heartless	Amanda MacNaughton	Television film
2006–2008	Wire in the Blood	DI Alex Fielding	Series 4–6 – 17 episodes
2010	Single-Handed	Gemma Burge	Series 4 – 6 episodes
2012	New Tricks	Sarah Powell	Series 9, Episode 7 "Dead Poets"
2012	Downton Abbey	Wilkins	Christmas Special: "A Journey to the Highlands"
2015	Crossing Lines	Emma Pacetti	Series – 1 Episode
2015	Da Vinci's Demons	Laura Cereta	Series – 8 Episodes
2017	The Loch	Mhari Toner	Series – 5 of 6 Episodes
2019	A Confession	Debbie O'Callaghan	Series – 5 of 6 Episodes
2020–2021	EastEnders	Katy Lewis	Series regular
2022	Shetland	Jill Stevens	Series 7
2023	The Scotts	Margie Grant	Series 3, Episode 2
2025-2026	River City	Vivienne Barton	

Additional credits

- Long Haul (2000 short film)
- Call Me ... Holly (2004 short film)
- Ark (2008 short film)
- Zip 'n Zoo ... Marion (2008 short film)
- The Other Side of My Sleep ... Maria (2010 short film)
- Divinity: Dragon Commander ... Aida (2013 video game)
- As He Lay Falling ... Bronte (2014 short film)
- Flicker and Go Out ... Lesley Parsons (2019 short film)
- Dark Road ... Aileen (2019 short film)
- Family Tree ...Jackie (2019 short film)
- Baby Dear ...Mother (2019 short film)
