= Fallen (British TV series) =

British television crime drama TV serial

- Title card
- Genre: Crime drama
- Written by: Steve Griffiths
- Directed by: Omar Madha
- Starring: Jonathan Cake; Simone Lahbib; Kerrie Taylor; Gary Love; David Gant; Nicholas Hope; Niall O'Mara; William Beck; Fiona Glascott
- Composer: Paul Leonard-Morgan
- Country of origin: United Kingdom
- Original language: English
- No. of series: 1
- No. of episodes: 2

Production
- Executive producers: Michele Buck; Rebecca Keane; Damien Timmer
- Producer: Matthew Read
- Cinematography: James Welland
- Editor: Adam Recht
- Running time: 90 minutes
- Production company: Meridian Broadcasting

Original release
- Network: ITV
- Release: 26 April – 27 April 2004

Fallen is a two-part British television crime drama, written by Steve Griffiths and directed by Omar Madha, first broadcast on ITV on 26 April 2004. The drama stars Jonathan Cake as Jason Shepherd, a police detective who wakes up in hospital in an amnesiac state after being subjected to a near fatal electrocution by members of a gang suspected to be involved in nuclear terrorism. Simone Lahbib stars as Shepherd's superior, DCI Kate Gunning, with Kerrie Taylor, Gary Love, David Gant and William Beck also among the principal cast members credited.

The series was also broadcast in Sweden, in Germany under the title Böser Cop, guter Cop (English: Good Cop, Bad Cop) and in France under the title À découvert (English: Discovered). The series was filmed in and around London. The series gathered respectable viewing figures, with the first part gathering 5.92 million viewers, and the second attracting 4.07 million.

== Cast ==
=== Main ===
- Jonathan Cake as DS Jason Shepherd
- Simone Lahbib as DCI Kate Gunning
- Kerrie Taylor as Louise Shephard
- Gary Love as DI Tom Beckett
- David Gant as Michael Richard Blaine
- Nicholas Hope as Chief Supt. Edridge
- Niall O'Mara as Wesley Shepherd
- William Beck as Dave Walker
- Fiona Glascott as Clare Woodward
- Lisa Hogg as Stefanie Weir
- Rebecca Sarker as Dr. Nisha Mehta
- Anton Saunders as Reece Reynolds
- Greg Hicks as David Houghton

=== Supporting ===
- Barry Aird as DS Tennant
- Gary Powell as DS Gray
- Stanley Townsend as Mara
- Tom Wu as Logan
- Sara Stockbridge as Nina
- James Lailey as Eisner
- Bill Ward as Sykes
- Ryan Pope as Jacket
- Richard Standing as Andy
- Phil Nice as Reeves

== Episodes ==
| No. overall | No. in series | Title | Directed by | Written by | Original release date | Viewers (millions) |
|---|---|---|---|---|---|---|
| 1 | 1 | "Part 1" | Omar Madha | Steve Griffiths | 26 April 2004 | 5.92 |
Detective Sergeant Jason Shepherd is hospitalised following a near-fatal electrocution, and regains consciousness with no memory of his life. After learning that he is a serving police officer, and is currently estranged from his wife and children, Shepherd sets about re-investigating the case he was working on before his accident with the help of his superior, DCI Kate Gunning, and is astonished to find that he seems to be in the pocket of known criminals as he uncovers evidence of nuclear terrorism.
| 2 | 2 | "Part 2" | Omar Madha | Steve Griffiths | 27 April 2004 | 4.07 |
As he tries to solve what happened, Shepherd is forced to confront some unsavoury truths about himself in order to work out if he is really corrupt, or was in fact working undercover.
