= Transference (disambiguation) =

Transference is a phenomenon in psychoanalysis.

Transference may also refer to:

== Psychology and psychotherapy ==
- Transference focused psychotherapy, a type of therapy
- Transference neurosis

== Media ==
- Transference (album), an album by the band Spoon
- Transference: A Bipolar Love Story, a 2020 film
- Transference (video game), a video game by the company SpectreVision
- "Transference" (Gotham), an episode of Gotham
