= London Bridge (TV series) =

British television series

- Genre: Soap opera
- Country of origin: United Kingdom
- Original language: English
- No. of series: 4
- No. of episodes: 237

Production
- Running time: 25 minutes
- Production company: Carlton

Original release
- Network: ITV
- Release: 15 February 1996 – 31 March 1999

London Bridge is a British soap opera made by Carlton for ITV and shown in the London region, as well as a few other ITV regions, including Central Independent Television and Granada Television. London Bridge revolved around a restaurant, SE1, and the neighbouring block of flats. It ran from 15 February 1996 to 31 March 1999.

It featured many actors who have gone on to star in bigger TV shows, including Bad Girls actresses Simone Lahbib and Mandana Jones and No Angels star Sunetra Sarker.

== Broadcast ==
It started out as a late-night drama which ran for 26 episodes in 1996, before returning as a twice-weekly soap opera later that year. It was not as popular as other British soaps due to only being shown regionally, although did on many occasions beat rival soap Hollyoaks shown on Channel 4. The show was axed in 1999. As of February 2015, the show started a repeat run on local TV channel London Live.

== Characters ==
Major characters included:

- Nick Kemp (Oliver Haden), the head chef and part-owner of SE1, a cockney with a violent temper and criminal connections
- Isobel 'Bel' Kemp (Nicola King S1/Sally Edwards S2-4), Nick's wife, a middle-class accountant and part-owner of SE1
- Liz Kemp (Rosalind March), Nick's sister and manager of SE1, a sarcastic woman who doesn't suffer fools gladly
- Jed Kemp (Sean Francis), Liz's son who works behind the bar at SE1 and drives a mini cab
- Mary O'Connor (Simone Lahbib), a resident of the flats who is raped and later has an affair with Nick
- Ravi Shah (Ayub Khan-Din), a lawyer and resident of the flats
- Sam Haynes (Mandana Jones), Ravi's doctor girlfriend and later wife
- Anthony 'Ant' Webster (Charles Simpson), Ravi's landlord and best friend who develops romantic feelings for Sam
- Claire Turner (Jo-Anne Stockham), the mother of Ant's daughter Elizabeth
- Cliff Lewis (Billy Geraghty), Nick's childhood friend and a chef at SE1
- Sid Kemp (Desmond Jordan), uncle of Nick and Liz
- Nancy Parker (Annabel Leventon), Sid's ex-wife and Cliff's mother

== Storylines ==
In its late-night format the show featured a gritty storyline involving newcomer Mary O'Connor (Simone Lahbib) being raped by a stalker. On becoming twice-weekly the soap introduced Cliff Lewis (Billy Geraghty) as Nick's former friend and the link to Nick's mysterious past. It was revealed that Nick and Cliff had been involved in an armed robbery together which had left a man dead. When Nick was murdered by being locked in the fridge at SE1, Cliff was the prime suspect. Cliff eventually told Nick's wife Isobel that he had seen her kill Nick and they embarked on a relationship. Isobel was eventually put on trial for Nick's murder, but was acquitted after the jury heard about the violence Nick had inflicted on her.

== Location ==
Despite the title and ostensibly being set on the South Bank, the series was in fact filmed in and around 3 Mills Studios in Bow, east London (which also features prominently in the titles and end credits).

== DVD releases ==
London Bridge Volume One, featuring the first 13 episodes, was released on DVD by Network on 14 November 2011. Volume Two was due to be released by Network in the summer of 2013, but this never came to pass.
