= Gary Love =

British actor and film director (born 1964)

- Born: Gary John Love; 26 November 1964 (age 61); Kensington, London, England
- Occupations: Actor, director
- Years active: 1983–present
- Spouse: Colette Brown

Gary John Love (born 26 November 1964) is a British actor and film director. He is best known for playing the role of Sergeant Tony Wilton in the British Army inspired award-winning series Soldier Soldier, and as Jimmy McClaren in Grange Hill in 1984. He is also a director and has directed episodes of London's Burning, Casualty and Waking the Dead.

Love was born in Kensington, London, and attended the Barbara Speake Stage School in Acton, West London.

== Filmography ==
=== As actor ===
- 1984: Grange Hill as Jimmy McClaren
- 1986: Starting Out as Mick Brown (2 episodes)
- 1988 A Question of Style (Austin Rover salesman training video)
- 1988: Jack the Ripper as Derek

Never the Twain as Postman

- 1989: Screen Two as Alan Loader ("Here Is the News")

Birds of a Feather as Pool Man ("Just Visiting")
Blackeyes as Colin (2 episodes)

- 1990: The Krays as Teddy "Steve" Smith
- 1991: Murder Most Horrid as Constable Williams ("The Case of the Missing")

The Bill as Mike Gibbs ("Thicker Than Water")

- 1993: You, Me and It as Gary
- 1991–1994: Soldier Soldier as Sgt Tony Wilton
- 1997: Loved by You as Lander
- 2000: Paranoid as Ned
- 2000: Essex Boys as Detective
- 2004: Fallen as DI Tom Beckett
- 2005: The Russian Dolls as Edward

Stoned as Jeff

=== As director ===
- 1993: Come Snow, Come Blow (TV)
- 1996: Masculine Mescaline (short film)
- 1998: London's Burning (Episode 11.8)
- 1999: Harbour Lights ("Baywatch", "Muckraker")
- 1997–2000: Casualty ("Out of Control", "Love Me Tender", "Eye Spy", "Love Over Gold" Part 1 & 2, "Seize the Night")
- 2001: Waking The Dead ("Every Breath You Take" Part 1 & 2)
- 2005: MIT (Episode 2.1, 2.2 & 2.4)
- 2007: Sugarhouse
- 2010: The Bill ("Keep Her Talking", "Suffer in Silence", "Who Dares Wins", "Death Knock")
- 2015: The Following ("Exposed")
