= The Young Person's Guide to Becoming a Rock Star =

- From left to right: Fiona Johnstone (Simone Lahbib), Wullie 'Bigot' Macboyne (Stephen McCole), Jez MacAllister (Ciarán McMenamin), Psycho MacPhail (Duncan Marwick) and Joe Nardone (Nicola Stapleton).
- Created by: Bryan Elsley
- Starring: Ciarán McMenamin; Simone Lahbib; Nicola Stapleton; Stephen McCole; Duncan Marwick; Gerard Butler; Jennifer Collins; Keith Allen
- Country of origin: United Kingdom
- Original language: English
- No. of series: 1
- No. of episodes: 6

Production
- Running time: 35 mins
- Production company: Company Television

Original release
- Network: Channel 4
- Release: 10 November – 15 December 1998

The Young Person's Guide to Becoming a Rock Star is a British comedy series, which aired on Channel 4 in 1998. It was a six-part satirical take on the music industry, written by Skins creator Bryan Elsley. The plot centred on a young Glaswegian band – Jocks Wa Hey – as they struggle to find success.

The series won Best Drama Serial at the 1999 RTS Television Awards and, that same year, writer Bryan Esley was nominated for Best Writer at the RTS Craft & Design Awards.

It was remade as My Guide to Becoming a Rock Star, a short-lived American/Canadian series that starred Oliver Hudson and was made for the now defunct WB Television Network.

== Synopsis ==
The series followed the ups and downs of a young Glaswegian band called Jocks-Wa-Hey and their attempts to "make it" in the tough and uncompromising world of the music industry.

The five-piece band consisted of: the charismatic Jez MacAllister (Ciarán McMenamin) on vocals – our guide through the painful process of becoming a rock'n'roll star; his best pal, bass player "Psycho" (Duncan Marwick), a disorganised student who is the complete opposite of his nickname; drummer Wullie MacBoyne (Stephen McCole), a mean looking psychopath, known as 'Bigot' to his mates; the insatiable and hard-hitting Joe Nardone (Nicola Stapleton) on lead guitar, with more 'balls' and arrogance than the rest of the band put together; and finally Jez's cool-headed welfare officer and electric keyboards wizard, Fiona Johnstone (aka MC Fiona; Simone Lahbib).

The band recruit new members, revolutionise their sound, acquire management, arrange a showcase gig, get signed, record a hopelessly over-budget album and cut a chaotic swathe through the cut-throat world of marketing and promotions, finally resting at the dizzy heights of a top ten single and a massive £3 million debt.

Along the way they encounter Slick Sloan (Keith Allen), the disingenuous A&R man; Derek Trout (Fish), record producer; and their cheesy manager Art Stilton (Forbes Masson) who also manages supergroup 'Bonk, Bonk, Bonk'.

The series also includes cameo appearances from Noel Gallagher, Chrissie Hynde, Jay Kay, 'Big' John Duncan, Denise van Outen, Sara Cox, Kirsty Wark, Samantha Fox, Edward Tudor-Pole, Keith Chegwin and Timmy Mallett.

The series inspired an American version in 2002, My Guide to Becoming a Rock Star.

== Episodes ==
No.	Title	Original release date
1	"Lifestyles of the Rich and Famous"	10 November 1998
Jez MacAllister begins the painful process of becoming a rock star as he puts together a band.
2	"Creating the Buzz"	17 November 1998
Fiona is recruited as the band's new member under two conditions; and one of them is to stop sleeping with Jez.
3	"The A & R Men Cometh"	24 November 1998
With no sign of a record deal after three months of gigging, Art is forced to arrange a showcase.
4	"Signing on the Line"	1 December 1998
The band arrive in London where they do a deal with Slick Sloan, then launch themselves on the capital's media scene.
5	"Making Tracks"	8 December 1998
The band arrives at Big Noise studios to record at the farmhouse of rock legend Derek Trout.
6	"Shifting the Units"	15 December 1998
The band's promotional schedule gathers pace and includes a chaotic appearance on a cult Friday-night TV show. Meanwhile, tensions within the band are exacerbated.

== Cast ==
(Cameos are excluded here and are listed in the Synopsis section above.)

- Frank Gallagher – Ossie MacAllister
- Simone Lahbib – Fiona Johnstone
- Duncan Marwick – Psycho MacPhail
- Forbes Masson – Art Stilton
- Stephen McCole – Wullie MacBoyne
- Ciarán McMenamin – Jeremy 'Jez' MacAllister
- Barbara Rafferty – Alice MacAllister
- Nicola Stapleton – Joe Nardone
- Eric Barlow – Kenny Dick
- Gerard Butler – Marty Claymore
- Ricky Callan – Simon
- Miffy – Roland Juno
- Jason Sweeney – Walter Dick
- Keith Allen – Slick Sloan
- Kirsten Scott – Student
- Jennifer Collins – Expert toothbrusher
- Fish – Derek Trout
- Jody Saron – Spice Girl

== Crew ==
- Sheree Folkson – director
- Kieron J. Walsh – director
- Bryan Elsley – writer
- Suzan Harrison – executive producer
- Peter Norris – producer
