= The Girl in the Picture (1985 film) =

- Directed by: Cary Parker
- Written by: Cary Parker
- Produced by: Paddy Higson
- Starring: John Gordon Sinclair; Irina Brook; David McKay; Gregor Fisher; Rikki Fulton; Simone Lahbib
- Music by: Ron Geesin
- Production companies: Antoine Productions; National Film Trustee Limited
- Distributed by: Rank
- Release date: 18 March 1986
- Running time: 84 mins
- Country: United Kingdom
- Language: English

The Girl in the Picture is a 1986 British film directed by Cary Parker and starring John Gordon Sinclair.

== Plot ==
Alan, a Glaswegian photographer, is keen to get back with his former girlfriend Mary. Meanwhile, his assistant Ken is smitten by a girl he knows only through her photograph.

== Cast ==
- John Gordon Sinclair as Alan
- Irina Brook as Mary
- David McKay as Ken
- Gregor Fisher
- Rikki Fulton
- Simone Lahbib

== Production ==
The film was written and directed by Cary Parker, an American from Atlanta. He fell in love with a woman from Glasgow he met at the University of Georgia and moved with her to Scotland. He worked as an assistant editor and wanted to direct (he had made short films in the US), but was asked for a script. Parker wrote the script for The Girl in the Picture and obtained finance. Finance came from Rank and the National Film Finance Corporation.

The producer was Paddy Higson who had worked on other Scottish filmed comedies such as That Sinking Feeling, Gregory's Girl, Living Apart Together and Restless Natives. She made the film through her own company, Antoine Productions, which she established in 1983 with her husband (who died shortly afterwards).

The film starred John Gordon Sinclair, who had been in Gregory's Girl. Higson said "“We tried very hard to come up with someone other than John Gordon Sinclair for the star part. But no one else could have done it so well.” The female lead was Irina Brook, daughter of Peter Brook.

Filming started April 1985 and took place in Glasgow.

== Reception ==
The Evening Standard wrote "everyone who likes Gregory's Girl should like this slighter romantic sequel."

The Guardian called it "slight but charming."

The Observer wrote "there is a feeling of calculation, of inauthenticity, of looking at the world through someone else's rose coloured glasses."

The Glasgow Herald called it "a modest light romantic comedy which ends up drowning in its own charm."
