= Taggart =

Scottish television detective series (1985–2010)

- 2010 title
- Genre: Crime drama
- Created by: Glenn Chandler
- Starring: Mark McManus; Neil Duncan; Blythe Duff; Iain Anders; James MacPherson; Colin McCredie; John Michie; Alex Norton; Siobhan Redmond
- Country of origin: Scotland
- Original language: English
- No. of series: 27
- No. of episodes: 109 (+ pilot) (list of episodes)

Production
- Executive producers: Margaret Enefer (2010); Eric Coulter (2001–2010)
- Producers: Marcus Wilson (2010); Graeme Gordon (2001–2010)
- Production locations: Glasgow, Scotland
- Running time: 60–120 minutes
- Production company: Scottish Television/STV Studios

Original release
- Network: ITV
- Release: 2 July 1985 – 7 November 2010

Taggart is a Scottish detective fiction television series created by Glenn Chandler, who wrote many of the episodes, and made by STV Studios for the ITV network. It originally ran as the miniseries Killer from 6 until 20 September 1983, before a full series was commissioned that ran from 2 July 1985 until 7 November 2010. The series revolved around a group of detectives initially in the Maryhill CID of Strathclyde Police, though various storylines were set in other parts of Greater Glasgow and in other areas of Scotland. The team operated out of the fictional John Street police station. Mark McManus, who played the title character Jim Taggart, died in 1994. However, the series continued under the same name. Taggart is one of the UK's longest-running television dramas.

== History ==
The Scottish BAFTA-winning pilot episode "Killer", directed by Laurence Moody and broadcast in 1983, introduced the character Detective Chief Inspector Jim Taggart (played by Mark McManus until his death in 1994), a tough and experienced detective who had worked his way up through the ranks. His original sidekick was Detective Sergeant Peter Livingstone (Neil Duncan). Livingstone represented the new breed of young graduates entering the police force and frequently had a difficult relationship with Taggart as a result. Taggart's boss in the pilot was Superintendent Robert Murray (Tom Watson), and his boss after the second episode, "Dead Ringer", was Superintendent Jack McVitie (Iain Anders). Another important character was Taggart's wife Jean (Harriet Buchan), whose physical disability did not prevent her from pursuing a number of interests in life, while her cynical husband stuck mainly to his job. Throughout the McManus era, there was nearly always a sub-plot in every episode which involved the domestic life of the Taggarts, which on occasion became intertwined with the case being investigated. The most memorable of these was the Taggarts' ongoing care of Jean's senile Aunt Hettie (Sheila Donald), whom Jim despises and begrudges staying in his house. This sub-plot ran through 1990–91 until the Hettie character was killed off in the 1991 season finale, "Violent Delights", in which her funeral is carried out by a firm of undertakers who are also the subject of Taggart's investigation.

In 1987 the character of Michael Jardine (James MacPherson) was introduced. Neil Duncan left the series in 1987 and in 1990 a new female sidekick Jackie Reid (Blythe Duff) was introduced.

McManus died in 1994 during the filming of an episode. Taggart's absence in the broadcast story was explained by his being in meetings with the Chief Constable throughout. In 1995 the episode "Black Orchid" opened with Taggart's funeral. Despite the death of the title character the series continued. Jardine was promoted to Detective Inspector and DC Stuart Fraser (Colin McCredie) was introduced, becoming the long-suffering sidekick to Jardine, former long-suffering sidekick to Taggart. Fraser was later revealed to be gay. McCredie had made an early appearance in Taggart when he played a suspect part of a youth gang. DI Robbie Ross (John Michie) joined the team in 1998. Michie had made an early appearance in Taggart in 1990 when he played a suspect called Robby Meiklejohn in an episode called "Love Knot".

When MacPherson left the series in 2002 his character was killed off and replaced with DCI Matt Burke, formerly of Special Branch, played by Alex Norton, who had previously appeared in the series playing murder suspect George Bryce in 1986 in the episode "Knife-Edge". The personal relationships of the police officers in this series were shown as nothing to be envious of: Reid described herself, Burke, Ross and Fraser as "three divorcees and a celibate homosexual" in the episode "Penthouse and Pavement". After filming was completed on series 26 in December 2009, Colin McCredie was informed that he and his character would not be returning for filming of the next series.

=== ITV/STV dispute ===
ITV plc, the company that operates the ITV network franchises in England, Wales and southern Scotland, failed to announce whether it planned to show any new episodes of Taggart, prompting STV to suspend production of the programme in September 2009. STV announced in November 2009 that it would produce new episodes of Taggart for broadcast in 2010 regardless of whether ITV plc decided to screen it.

In February 2010 it was announced that ITV and STV had put their wider commercial differences to one side to make a new series, which Scottish viewers got to see first. The two broadcasters co-commissioned a six-part series of the show; UKTV also invested in return for repeat rights. New episodes of Taggart debuted on STV in autumn 2010 before being broadcast on ITV across the rest of the UK in 2011. The UKTV Channel Alibi showed the episodes in 2013. Online catch-up of the new series was not available to users of STV Player until the show had been broadcast on ITV and UTV.

== Format and broadcast information ==
The format of the show changed over the years. Originally the show ran with three one-hour episodes to each story. This was later changed starting with the last transmitted story in 1998 to a regular pattern of two-hour stand-alone stories and beginning in July 2002 these were shortened to 60 minutes. After a two-hour special episode in January 2003 episodes were again lengthened starting in October, this time to 90 minutes continuing through the 2008 New Year special "Genesis". After this the show became a series of one-hour stand-alone stories for the first time since 2003.

Fans of the show were often frustrated by the erratic scheduling of the show. Although blocks or series of the show were filmed together, they were often not shown together as with other series. Instead, they were fitted into the schedule whenever there was a gap, meaning that they were often not shown in consecutive weeks or on one set night of the week. Often months passed between episodes of the same series being shown. This was very much the case in Australia with ABC TV showing episodes featuring the three lead actors in haphazard order with current or recent shows. This made it very difficult to understand the history of the show.

=== DVD releases ===
The DVD rights in the UK for many Taggart episodes the earlier series in particular are held by Clearvision. However, some episodes, in particular those from 2002 onwards, have been released on DVD in the UK by Acorn Media UK. There are also Region 1 and Region 4 releases for North American and Australasian markets. Some of the DVD releases are now quite rare and out-of-print, and there has been no Blu-ray release at present.

== Cast ==
=== Main ===
- Mark McManus as DCI Jim Taggart (1983–1995)
- Neil Duncan as DS Peter Livingstone (1983–1987, 1994)
- Iain Anders as Superintendent Jack McVitie (1985–1998)
- James MacPherson as DS/DI/DCI Michael Jardine (1987–2002)
- Blythe Duff as WPC/DC/DS/DI Jackie Reid (1990–2010)
- Colin McCredie as DC Stuart Fraser (1995–2010)
- John Michie as DI Robbie Ross (1998–2010)
- Alex Norton as DCI Matt Burke (2002–2010)
- Robert Robertson as Pathologist Dr Stephen Andrews (1983–2001)
- Harriet Buchan as Jean Taggart (1983–1995)

=== Other ===
- Tom Watson as Superintendent Robert Murray (1983–1985)
- Gavin Brown as Sgt Blackman (1983–1985)
- Stuart Hepburn as DS Kenny Forfar (1986-1987)
- Patricia Ross as DS/Sgt Laura Campbell (1987–1988)
- Anthony Cochrane as Dr Colin Crawford (1987–1993)
- Leigh Biagi as Alison Taggart (1988–1993)
- Gray O'Brien as DC Rob Gibson (1993–1995)
- Yasmin Marley as WPC Heather McIntyre (1999–2001)
- Brian Cowan as DCS Brian Holmes (2000–2005)
- Lesley Harcourt as Pathologist Dr Gemma Kerr (2003–2005)
- Michael MacKenzie as Pathologist Dr Magnus Baird (2005–2008)
- Katrina Bryan as Pathologist Dr Ellis Sinclair (2008–2010)
- Alan McHugh as Assistant Chief Constable Strathairn (2008–10)
- Davood Ghadami as Pathologist Duncan Clark (2010)
- Siobhan Redmond as Chief Supt. Karen Campbell (2010)
- Anneika Rose as DC/DS Mita Rahim (2010)

== Guest appearances ==
Actors appearing on Taggart episodes over the years include:

- Dave Anderson (Episodes: Knife-Edge, Instruments of Justice, Ghost Rider & Compensation)
- Lucy Akhurst
- Paul Barber (Episode: Football Crazy)
- Johnny Beattie (Episode: Evil Eye)
- Isla Blair (Episodes: Murder in Season & Hellfire)
- David Bradley
- Susan Brown
- Mark Bonnar (Episodes: An Eye for an Eye & Ends of Justice)
- Billy Boyd (Episode: Dead Man's Chest)
- Ewen Bremner (Episode: Love Knot)
- Tam Dean Burn (Episodes: Double Exposure, The Ties That Bind & Bad Medicine)
- Brian Capron (Episode: A Fistful of Chips)
- Robert Carlyle (Episode: Hostile Witness)
- Tom Chadbon
- Jimmy Chisholm (Episode: Puppet on a String)
- Pandora Clifford
- Ian Colquhoun (Episode: Point of Light)
- George A. Cooper
- James Cosmo (Episode: Dead Giveaway)
- Annette Crosbie (Episode: Funeral Rites)
- David Crellin
- Alan Cumming (Episode: Death Call)
- Henry Ian Cusick (Episode: Fatal Inheritance)
- Jake D'Arcy (Episode: Dead Ringer)
- Iain De Caestecker
- Kate Dickie (Episode: Penthouse and Pavement)
- Barbara Dickson (Episode: Legends)
- Reece Dinsdale (Episode: Bad Medicine)
- Ron Donachie (Episodes: Funeral Rites, Death Benefits, Dead Reckoning, Falling in Love & Law)
- Duncan Duff (Episode: Hostile Witness)
- John Duttine (Episode: Devil's Advocate)
- Norman Eshley (Episode: Death Comes Softly)
- James Faulkner
- Fish (Episode: Skin Deep)
- Hugh Fraser (Episode: Gingerbread)
- Laura Fraser (Episode: Devil's Advocate)
- Ronald Fraser (Episode: Violent Delights)
- Vincent Friell (Episodes: Killer, Funeral Rites, Secrets & Bloodlines)
- Frank Gallagher (Episodes: Death Comes Softly & Fire, Burn)
- Jill Gascoine (Episode: Evil Eye)
- Alexandra Gilbreath
- Iain Glen (Episode: Knife-Edge)
- Julian Glover (Episode: Black Orchid)
- Michelle Gomez
- Hannah Gordon (Episode: Fatal Inheritance)
- Julie Graham
- Frances Grey
- Sheila Grier (Episodes: The Killing Philosophy & Falling in Love)
- John Grillo
- Clare Grogan (Episode: The Hit Man)
- Margo Gunn
- John Hannah (Episode: Evil Eye)
- Diana Hardcastle
- Daniel Healy (Episode: Do or Die)
- Lorna Heilbron (Episodes: Nest of Vipers & Apocalypse)
- Vivien Heilbron (Episode: Gingerbread)
- Douglas Henshall (Episode: Love Knot)
- Ian Hogg (Episode: The Hit Man)
- Russell Hunter (Episode: Death Comes Softly)
- Celia Imrie (Episode: Root of Evil)
- Kenny Ireland (Episode: Root of Evil)
- Jason Isaacs (Episode: Double Exposure)
- Meg Johnson
- Robert Jezek
- Ashley Jensen (Episode: A Taste of Money)
- Berwick Kaler
- Diane Keen (Episode: Cold Blood)
- Sinéad Keenan
- Gerard Kelly (Episodes: Killer & Mind Over Matter)
- Simone Lahbib (Episodes: Nest of Vipers & Prayer for the Dead)
- Larry Lamb
- Caroline Langrishe
- Phyllida Law (Episode: Forbidden Fruit)
- Gary Lewis (Episodes: Devil's Advocate & Homesick)
- Richard Lintern
- Jimmy Logan (Episode: Flesh and Blood)
- Phyllis Logan (Episode: Trust)
- Richard Madden
- Dominic Mafham
- Francis Matthews (Episode: Fatal Inheritance)
- Murray McArthur
- Brian McCardie (Episodes: Secrets, Bad Blood, Homesick & Silent Truth)
- Maimie McCoy
- Kathleen McDermott (Episode: Blood Money)
- Joe McFadden (Episodes: Root of Evil & Secrets)
- Sean McGinley
- John McGlynn (Episodes: Dead Ringer, Evil Eye, Secrets, Long Time Dead & The Friday Night Event)
- Stuart McGugan (Episode: Dead Giveaway)
- Lorraine McIntosh (Episodes: Long Time Dead, Halfway House & Safer)
- Neve McIntosh
- Pollyanna McIntosh
- Allison McKenzie (Episode: Football Crazy)
- Una McLean (Episode: Death Trap)
- Graham McTavish (Episode: Mind Over Matter)
- Jill Melford (Episode: Fatal Inheritance)
- Glen Michael (Episode: Legends)
- Ann Mitchell (Episode: Nest of Vipers)
- Gavin Mitchell (Episodes: Fire, Burn & The Hit Man)
- Jon Morrison (Episode: Wavelength)
- Alexander Morton (Episodes: Dead Ringer, Death Benefits & The Rapture)
- Peter Mullan (Episodes: Love Knot and Rogues Gallery)
- Joe Mullaney (Episode: Dead Ringer)
- Daniela Nardini (Episode: Death without Dishonour)
- Alec Newman
- Julie Wilson Nimmo (Episode: Point of Light)
- Peter O'Brien (Episode: Death without Dishonour)
- David O'Hara (Episode: Evil Eye)
- Dorothy Paul (Episodes: Murder in Season & Flesh and Blood)
- James Anthony Pearson
- Julie Peasgood (Episode: Death without Dishonour)
- Carmen Pieraccini (Episodes: Football Crazy & An Eye for an Eye)
- Andrew Lee Potts (Episode: Law)
- Richard Rankin (Episode: IOU)
- Amanda Redman (Episode: Black Orchid)
- Annabel Reid (Episode: A Fistful of Chips)
- Mary Riggans (Episodes: Killer and Double Exposure)
- John Ringham
- David Rintoul (Episode: Death Comes Softly)
- Natalie J. Robb (Episodes: Violent Delights & Legends)
- Christian Rodska
- William Ruane
- Jenny Runacre
- Sean Scanlan (Episodes: Death Benefits, Puppet on a String & Trust)
- David Schofield
- Dougray Scott (Episode: Nest of Vipers)
- Morag Siller
- Jamie Sives
- Steve John Shepherd (Episode: Bad Medicine)
- Sharon Small (Episode: Forbidden Fruit)
- Hugo Speer
- Rob Spendlove
- Gerda Stevenson
- Ewan Stewart (Episode: Judgement Day)
- Sara Stewart (Episodes: Ring of Deceit & A Death Foretold)
- Ken Stott (Episode: Murder in Season)
- Donald Sumpter
- Garry Sweeney (Episodes: Watertight & Users and Losers)
- Meera Syal (Episode: Double Exposure)
- Andrew Tiernan (Episode: Black Orchid)
- Gareth Thomas
- Siân Thomas (Episode: Ring of Deceit)
- Kim Thomson (Episode: Fact and Fiction)
- Michael Troughton
- Deepak Verma (Episode: Double Exposure)
- Ronan Vibert (Episode: Users and Losers)
- Sara Vickers
- Julian Wadham (Episode: Running Out of Time)
- June Watson
- Gary Webster (Episode: Evil Eye)
- Tam White (Episodes: The Hit Man & Ghost Rider)
- Jan Wilson (Episode: Apocalypse)
- Greg Wise
- Paul Young (Episodes: Funeral Rites & Legends)
- Jimmy Yuill (Episodes: Killer & Fact and Fiction)

Note: Where multiple episodes are listed here, a different character is portrayed in each episode. Recurring characters are listed in Cast sections above.

== Filming locations ==
The show was primarily shot in and around Glasgow and its metropolitan area, but the show occasionally ventured further, for example to Loch Lomond, Edinburgh and the Scottish Highlands.

The original title card of the show used a panoramic shot of Glasgow taken from the summit of the Cathkin Braes to the south of the city. In the early years live infill shots of the city were also taken from this vantage point. In later years a shot of the city centre taken from The Lighthouse on Mitchell Lane was used.

In later series the buildings of the University of Strathclyde were extensively used for exterior and interior shots. The entrance level of the Colville Building and the James Weir Building were both used as the police station as well as the interior of the Livingstone Tower. John Street, the name given to the police station in the series, is a real location within the campus.

== Episodes ==
The series began with a miniseries pilot, titled "Killer", followed by 109 episodes of Taggart. Early episodes were split into multiple parts and aired over three weeks while later episodes were self-contained.

== International distribution ==
In Australia the series aired on ABC1. In 2011 ABC1 aired episodes on Friday at 8:30pm. ABC1 actually broadcast episodes 101 "IOU", 102 "Local Hero", and 103 "The Rapture" before STV did because of scheduling conflicts. 7TWO airs repeat episodes right back to the first episode.

In New Zealand the series aired on Vibe.

In Ireland the series aired on RTÉ.

In Denmark, the series aired on DR, and it was a popular show with Danish subtitles. Taggart was first broadcast on DR2 from 2002 to 2006 as six more episodes were then aired. After the digitising of Danish television, Taggart appeared on DR1 from episodes featuring James MacPherson as DCI Jardine. Ever since Taggart has aired from the first miniseries "Killer" until the episode length was cut to 45 minutes. Three-episode stories have aired one after another but have also combined into one long episode.

== Analysis ==
Jim Taggart's homophobia was seen to be representative of the level of bigotry still prevalent in the British police in the 1980s, and was challenged by Peter Livingstone early in the series.
