= Family (2003 TV series) =

- Genre: Crime drama
- Created by: Tim Vaughan; Roger Smith; Jamie Foreman
- Starring: Martin Kemp; Jamie Foreman; David Calder; Simone Lahbib; Camille Coduri
- Country of origin: United Kingdom
- Original language: English
- No. of series: 1
- No. of episodes: 6 (list of episodes)

Production
- Executive producers: Michelle Buck; Tim Vaughan
- Producer: Rebecca Edwards
- Production locations: London, England
- Running time: 60 mins (w/advertisements)
- Production company: LWT

Original release
- Network: ITV
- Release: 29 September – 12 November 2003

Family is an ITV crime drama series, first broadcast on 29 September 2003, starring Martin Kemp and Jamie Foreman as two gangster brothers operating in London's East End. Family ran for one series, comprising six episodes. A DVD of the complete series was released on 30 March 2009.

== Plot ==
Family follows a family of London gangsters headed by Ted Cutler (David Calder). One of his sons, Joey (Martin Kemp), is happily married with two children and tries to keep 'business' separate from home life, while the other son, Dave (Jamie Foreman) is a loose cannon with a nasty temper who has just returned from America, where he fled following a family rift. Only Joey sees a way out by running a high class restaurant - but this venture is not without violence.

== Production ==
Jamie Foreman devised and co-wrote the show alongside scriptwriters Tim Vaughan and Roger Smith. Nick Elliott, controller of ITV drama, said of the series;

"Jamie plays the loopy brother, while Martin is like Al Pacino's character in the Godfather, desperately wanting to be straight but going along with the dodgy stuff. There will also be this father figure. It's a contemporary London gangster show and it will have a lot of authenticity. There'll be a contrast between Martin living a normal suburban lifestyle, then going to meetings to discuss rubbing someone out and being involved in rackets and organised crime. He's got a wife and a daughter who takes cello lessons, who don't know about the other life he leads."

Elliott commissioned the six-part series alongside Granada South drama controller, Michele Buck.

== Reception ==
Family was well received by critics and media buyers, who welcomed it as part of a "quality-based offensive" in ITV's autumn schedule. But after a respectable start with 6.1 million viewers watching on 29 September, the programme lost nearly two million viewers, drawing only 4.3 million in the same slot four weeks later. Although there were only two more episodes to be aired, Nigel Pickard, Head of ITV's programming, ditched the show from its prime time slot and consigned it instead to a graveyard slot of 11:30pm on Wednesdays. This meant that the episode previously scheduled for 27 October 2003 was replaced with a rerun of Airline.

== Cast ==
- Martin Kemp as Joey Cutler; Ted's youngest son
- Jamie Foreman as Dave Cutler; Ted's eldest son
- David Calder as Ted Cutler; head of the Cutler family
- Simone Lahbib as Jacqueline Cutler; Joey and Dave's younger sister
- Camille Coduri as Sophie Cutler; Joey's wife
- Holley Chant as Yvonne Cutler; Dave's wife, whom he met in America
- Sally Dexter as Natalie Parton; Ted's long-term partner
- Rachel Crowther as Esmee Cutler; Joey and Sophie's eldest daughter
- Florence Bass as Georgia Cutler; Joey and Sophie's youngest daughter
- Linda Marlowe as Jean Cutler; Ted's ex-wife and mother of his children
- Matt Bardock as Inspector Mickey Fowler; a corrupt police officer
- Phil McKee as DS Bob Fletcher; a murder squad detective
- Peter Marinker as Ronnie; an ex-con working as the Cutler's business manager
- Danny Midwinter as Graham; Joey and Dave's driver and general skivvy
- Crispin Bonham-Carter as Mike; a suspected undercover cop, who is Jacqueline's love interest
- Charles Daish as Rory MacLeod; co-owner of McLeod's, a high-class restaurant in the East End
- Pandora Clifford as Jenny McLeod; co-owner of McLeod's, who is married to Rory's
- Jo Joyner as Lucy; service manager at McLeod's, and Dave's love interest
- Samuel Clemens as Paul; waiter at McLeod's

== Episodes ==
No.	Title	Directed by	Written by	Original release date	UK viewers (millions)
1	"People United By Conviction"	David Drury	Roger Smith & Tim Vaughan	29 September 2003	6.35
In an attempt to expand their empire, the Cutler family decide to plan an armed robbery on a high-class East End restaurant. Following the robbery, Ted (David Calder) and Joey (Martin Kemp) approach the owners, Rory (Charles Daish) and Jenny (Pandora Clifford), and offer them protection in return for 40% of the restaurant's annual takings. Meanwhile, Ted 's estranged son Dave (Jamie Foreman) returns from America after more than ten years away, and immediately makes his presence known. But Dave's behaviour soon endangers the Cutler family empire when a spat gets out of hand, and he ends up throwing restaurant manager Liam (Hywel Morgan) out of a balcony window to his death.
2	"A Collective Body of Persons"	David Drury	Roger Smith & Tim Vaughan	6 October 2003	5.26
With Liam safely out of the picture, attentions turn to Martin (John Ashton), who owes the Cutlers £6000. With his daughter's wedding looming, Joey warns him that failure to repay the debt will result in him leaving the wedding reception in a coffin. Martin decides to rob a local off-licence with the help of his nephew, Graham (Danny Midwinter), but is surprised when Ted rebuffs his efforts to clear his name and instead wipes the debt and demands that the money be spent on his daughter's honeymoon. A furious Martin unleashes his anger at the Cutlers, unaware that his actions will have fatal consequences. Meanwhile, Dave's wife Yvonne (Holley Chant) returns from America with their two-year-old son, Eddie.
3	"A Fundamental Social Group"	David Drury	Roger Smith & Tim Vaughan	13 October 2003	5.05
Joey is concerned about Jacqueline's blossoming relationship with boyfriend Mike (Crispin Bonham-Carter), and issues her a stern warning. Meanwhile, the McLeod's hire a new restaurant manager, Lucy (Jo Joyner), but her first day proves eventful when she stumbles upon Rory trying to take his own life. Jenny subsequently makes the decision to hand over the running of the restaurant to Ted and Joey, and offers to sell her and Rory's shares in the business. Joey is surprised to discover that Ted has lined Dave up as the new restaurant manager, and his day goes from bad to worse when Mickey (Matt Bardock) informs him that the Rozzers want £25,000 to cover up Dave's involvement in Liam's death.
4	"Sharing Goals and Values"	David Drury	Roger Smith & Tim Vaughan	20 October 2003	Under 4.59
Elliott Johnson (Ray Emmet Brown), the son of one of Ted's former associates, approaches the family asking for help after committing an armed robbery to the tune of £150,000. Although Elliott promises the family a cut of the proceeds, Dave becomes greedy and decides to make some sneaky decisions of his own. Meanwhile, it's Joey and Sophie's wedding anniversary, and Joey is busy organising a surprise party. Dave's working relationship with Lucy begins to blossom, so much so that friendship soon turns into romance. Meanwhile, Ted (David Calder) seeks revenge after receiving word from the police that the victim of the armed robbery undertaken by Elliott is a former business associate.
5	"One Common Progenitor"	David Drury	Roger Smith & Tim Vaughan	5 November 2003	Under 4.47
Following their disposal of Elliott, the Cutlers come under fire from an armed motorcycle gang, and Jean (Linda Marlowe) is shot. In response to the attack, Dave asks Ron to gather details of Elliott's criminal network of friends in an attempt to identify the perpetrator. From her hospital bed, Jean makes suggestions that Ted was behind the attack, which arouses Dave's suspicions. As Ron delivers the name of the alleged gunman, Dave and Joey set about dealing retribution. When gang member Wilf (Charles Jarman) is found shot dead on a Peckham housing estate, his associates return the favour by sending two armed gunman to trash the restaurant. Meanwhile, Joey uncovers a long-buried family secret.
6	"A Group of Like Things"	David Drury	Roger Smith & Tim Vaughan	12 November 2003	Under 4.90
Ted receives the devastating results of his prostate exam, and is forced to make the heartbreaking decision between an operation or chemotherapy. Meanwhile, Joey is struggling to come to terms with the revelation that his real father was murdered by Ted, and seeks advice from Jacqueline. With the police breathing down his neck, Joey decides to organise a meeting with Bob Fletcher to discuss the suggested £50,000 payoff for dropping the murder case hanging over Dave's head. As tensions start to boil to the surface, Joey loses his temper and ends up firing five rounds into Fletcher's chest. Realising that there is no way out of the situation, Ted and Joey prepare to flee the country to start again in Cyprus.
