= My Guide to Becoming a Rock Star =

- Genre: Sitcom
- Based on: Characters in The Young Person's Guide to Becoming a Rock Star by Bryan Elsley
- Developed by: John Riggi
- Starring: Oliver Hudson; Lauren Hodges; Kevin Rankin; Kris Lemche; Emmanuelle Vaugier; Brian Dietzen
- Composer: Chad Fischer
- Country of origin: United States
- Original language: English
- No. of seasons: 1
- No. of episodes: 13 (8 unaired)

Production
- Executive producers: Bryan Elsley; John Riggi
- Camera setup: Single-camera
- Running time: 30 minutes
- Production companies: Company Pictures; Tiny Hat Productions; Warner Bros. Television

Original release
- Network: The WB
- Release: March 14 – March 21, 2002

My Guide to Becoming a Rock Star is an American sitcom television series starring Oliver Hudson. The series premiered March 14, 2002 on The WB. It is based on the British series The Young Person's Guide to Becoming a Rock Star.. The show was supposed to run for 6 weeks, but was pulled after 3 weeks.

== Plot ==
The series focuses on Jace Darnell, the creator and lead singer of his fictional band SlipDog. He, as well as lead guitarist Doc, bassist Joe, keyboardist/DJ Sarah, and drummer Danny–later replaced by drummer Lucas–try to make it in the music business, possibly helped by their reluctant manager Dole.

== Critical reception ==
USA Today published a negative review which stated, "Unfortunately, like so many shows aimed at young people, Rock Star sadly underestimates the intelligence of its audience. Aside from some mildly amusing moments...the show seldom can be bothered to come up with anything even borderline clever." Steve Johnson of the Chicago Tribune criticized the show for poor acting, excessive narration, and a lack of humor.

== Cast ==
- Oliver Hudson as Jace Darnell
- Lauren Hodges as Joe Delamo
- Kevin Rankin as Doc Pike
- Kris Lemche as Lucas Zank
- Emmanuelle Vaugier as Sarah Nelson
- Brian Dietzen as Owen

== Episodes ==
No.	Title	Directed by	Written by	Original release date
1	"Pilot"	Rodman Flender	Teleplay by : John Riggi & Bryan Elsley	March 14, 2002
2	"The New Drummer"	Rodman Flender	John Riggi	March 14, 2002
3	"Fame"	Michael Engler	Alec Holland & Melissa Samuels	March 15, 2002
4	"The Road Gig"	Michael Engler	Steve Rudnick	March 21, 2002
5	"Pay to Play"	Michael Engler	Vince Calandra	March 21, 2002
6	"Inspiration"	Michael Engler	J. Elvis Weinstein	Unaired
7	"The Yoko Factor"	Craig Zisk	Leonard Dick	Unaired
8	"The Session"	John Payson	J. Elvis Weinstein	Unaired
9	"The Competition"	Craig Zisk	Story by : Peg Healey; Teleplay by : Alec Holland & Melissa Samuels	Unaired
10	"The Wedding Singers"	Lev L. Spiro	Vince Calandra	Unaired
11	"One Night Only"	Peter Lauer	Peg Healey	Unaired
12	"The Betrayal"	John Riggi	Leonard Dick & Steve Rudnick	Unaired
13	"The Deal"	Rodman Flender	John Riggi	Unaired
