= Pandora Clifford =

British actress

- Born: Pandora Jane Clifford; 13 December 1972 (age 53); Hammersmith, London, England
- Education: London Academy of Music and Dramatic Art
- Occupation: Actress
- Father: Timothy Clifford

Pandora Clifford (born 13 December 1972) is an English actress who has appeared in various roles on stage and screen including Agatha Christie's Poirot, Wallander, Taggart and New Tricks

Born in 1972 in London, brought up near Edinburgh, she read classics at Bristol University before training at LAMDA. She wrote for the Art Sales Page of The Daily Telegraph. She is the daughter of Sir Timothy Clifford, former Director of the National Galleries of Scotland and Jane Clifford (née Paterson), previously the Principal Designer for Laura Ashley and Zoffany.

== Family ==
Pandora Jane Rosamund Clifford married Philip Mark Ivo Curwen (Ivo) in Scotland on 14 July 2001 but the marriage was void. A London marriage took place later that year.

== Career ==
Clifford played Lady Emily Palmerston in series 3 of the PBS/ITV series Victoria as the wife of Lord Henry Palmerston (Laurence Fox). She appeared on stage with Marcus Brigstocke in The Railway Children.

She has been seen on television as Vivienne Baxter in the BBC's New Tricks with Amanda Redman, Alun Armstrong, James Bolam and Anna Calder Marshall, and previously as Elizabeth Carlen in the BBC's Wallander with Kenneth Branagh, which won Best Drama BAFTA 2009; and on film as HRH The Duchess of Kent in Telstar, starring Kevin Spacey and Con O'Neill.

== Filmography ==
=== Film ===
Year	Title	Role	Notes
1997	Superwoman	Emma	Short film
2001	Two Days, Nine Lives	Annabelle	
2008	Telstar: The Joe Meek Story	Her Royal Highness	
2013	I Hate You Justin Bieber	Rachael	Short film
2019	Rupert, Rupert & Rupert	Tamsin Hollonby	
2024	Blackwater Lane	Susie	

=== Television ===
Year	Title	Role	Notes
1988	The Play on One	Horsewoman	Episode: "The Dunroamin' Rising"
1996	Scene	Forester	Episode: "Forest People"
1999	The Bill	Geraldine Hobart	Episode: "Sleeping with the Enemy"
2000	Chambers	Barrister	Episode: "Phantom Barrister"
2001	Agatha Christie's Poirot	Sheila Maitland	Episode: "Murder in Mesopotamia"
2003	Family	Jenny MacLeod	Recurring role; 2 episodes
2004	Family Affairs	TV Reporter	Guest role; 1 episode
2007	Taggart	Penny Forsyth	Episode: "Users and Losers"
2008	Wallander	Elizabeth Carlen	Episode: "Sidetracked"
2011	New Tricks	Vivienne Baxter	Episode: "Object of Desire"
2012	EastEnders	Dr. Antonia Moyles	Guest role; 1 episode
2013	Doctors	Dr. Jennifer Barber	Episode: "Monster"
2013	Casualty	Eleanor Brown	Episode: "Once There Was a Way Home: Part 1"
2013	Midsomer Murders	Juliet Tilman	Episode: "Death and the Divas"
2013	Dracula	Lady Hope Dawson	Episode: "The Blood Is the Life"
2015	Doctors	Sophia Huppert	Episode: "Shambles"
2015	Casualty	Anya Braithwaite	Episode: "Forsaking All Others: Part 1"
2015	Asylum	Mimi Kempton-Stewart	Episode: "Public Relations"
2017	Fearless	Nicola Osborne	Miniseries; 2 episodes
2018	Press	Anya Fyles	Episode: "Don't Take My Heart, Don't Break My Heart"
2019	Doctors	Professor Tania van der Voort	Episode: "Samuel Page"
2019	Victoria	Emily Palmerston	Recurring role; 2 episodes
2021	Hitmen	Nat	Episode: "Reunion"
2022	Doctors	Steph Ashdown	Recurring role; 5 episodes

== Stage includes ==
- The Railway Children... Mother (dir Damian Cruden, Waterloo Station Theatre, London)
- Private Lives... Amanda (dir Nick Green, Oxford Shakespeare Company, Oxford)
- W for Banker... Louise (dir Ray Kilby, New End Theatre, Hampstead, London)
- The Ones That Flutter... Rachel Brooks (dir Abbey Wright, Theatre 503, London)
- Romeo and Juliet... Lady Capulet (dir Polly Findlay, Battersea Arts Centre, London)
- The Good Woman of Nohant... Solange (dir Chris McCullough, Royal National Theatre rehearsed reading)
- Noises Off... Brooke Ashton (dir Jeremy Sams, Comedy Theatre, West End, London)
- The Ecstatic Bible... 15 year-old Boy (dir Howard Barker, Adelaide Festival)
- Ride Down Mt Morgan... Bessie (dir David Taylor, Derby Playhouse)
- Frankenstein... Elizabeth (dir Damien Cruden, York Theatre Royal)
- Look Back in Anger... Alison (David Lightbody, tour of Scotland, Stray Theatre Company)

== Radio ==
- Separate Tables... Jean Stratton (BBC Radio 4)
- Britannia's Wives... 1930's Diplomat's Wife (BBC Radio 4)
