= Iain Anders =

English actor

- Born: Iain Anders Robertson; 8 February 1933; Barnet, Hertfordshire, England
- Died: 5 September 1997 (aged 64); Chichester, West Sussex, England
- Occupation: Actor
- Years active: 1965-1997
- Spouse: Harriet Robertson (m. 1970)

Iain Anders Robertson (8 February 1933 – 5 September 1997) was an English actor known for his roles in Taggart and A Horseman Riding By.

Iain Anders Robertson was born to Scottish parents in 1933 in Barnet, Hertfordshire. His career as an actor included many crime-related roles, and in this way paralleled his off-screen life, where he worked as a legal executive for a law firm specialising in criminal law, preparing court briefs.

On screen, Anders appeared in small parts in many series, often playing either policemen or criminals. Among these were appearances in such shows as Z-Cars, Softly, Softly, and Juliet Bravo. His first screen appearance was as a prison officer in 1965 in Three Clear Sundays, a play in the "Wednesday Play" series. He also appeared on stage throughout England and Scotland during the 1950s and 1960s. His first stage appearance was as an extra in a performance of Shakespeare's Henry V in Birmingham.

In 1985, Anders was also introduced into the television show Taggart, playing Superintendent Jack "The Biscuit" McVitie, alongside Mark McManus, who played the title character. It is for this role that he is most widely remembered, playing the role in 40 episodes, three of which did not screen until after his death.

In his spare time, Anders was an expert at contract bridge, which he taught at the London School of Bridge.
