= Timothy Clifford =

British art historian

Sir Timothy Peter Plint Clifford (born 26 January 1946) is a British art historian. Clifford was the director of the National Galleries of Scotland from 1984 to 2006. He was known for his innovative methods for hanging and displaying art, and for his ability to leverage limited acquisition funds to purchase important works of art.

== Career ==
=== Positions ===
- 1968–1976, Assistant Keeper, Department of Paintings, Manchester City Art Gallery.
- 1976–1978, Assistant Keeper, Department of Prints and Drawings, British Museum.
- 1978–1984, Director, Manchester City Art Galleries.
- 1984–2006, Director, National Galleries of Scotland.

=== Innovations ===
First in Manchester and later in Edinburgh, Clifford exhibited art as it would once have been displayed in the great houses of England, Scotland, and the Continent. This involved using striking backgrounds, with walls colorfully painted or hung with cloth, and triple-hanging the pictures. Suitable works of art and furniture were added to rooms, to give a sense of period or atmosphere.

== Exhibitions ==
- 2003, Claude Monet.

== Bibliography ==
- Clifford, Timothy, Aidan Weston-Lewis, and Michael Bury. "The Age of Titian: Venetian Renaissance Art From Scottish Collections." Edinburgh: National Galleries of Scotland, 2006.
- Clifford, Timothy, John Kenworthy-Brown, and Hugh Honour, "The Three Graces." Edinburgh: National Galleries of Scotland, 1995.
