= Alan Macmillan =

Television producer/director

Alan Macmillan (born 1949) is a television producer and director.

== Education ==
Macmillan was educated at Strathallan School and the Birmingham School of Art.

== Director ==
Macmillan started his directing career in the mid-1980s making several documentaries and a docudrama called Charles Rennie Mackintosh: Dreams and Recollections for Scottish Television. In 1987 he was asked to direct several episodes of Taggart, the Scottish detective series, which he would continue to work on until 2005. Macmillan was producer and director of Crime Story: The Britoil Affair, which was nominated in the Best Single Drama category at the 1993 BAFTA Scotland Awards. He also directed numerous episodes of The Bill and most of series six of Ballykissangel.

== Filmography ==
Year	Film/Programme	Credit
1985	The Garden Within	Director
1986	Held in Trust	Director
1987	Charles Rennie Mackintosh: Dreams and Recollections	Director
1987-2005	Taggart	Director - 15 episodes
1990	Take The High Road	Director - 8 episodes
1992-1994	Crime Story	Producer and director - 3 episodes
1996	The Witch's Daughter (film)	Director
1998	Minty	Director - 13 episodes
2000-2007	The Bill	Director - 21 episodes
2001	Ballykissangel Series six	Director - 5 episodes
2002	Nice Guy Eddie	Director
2003	Jeopardy	Director - 1 episode
2006	There's Been a Murder: A Celebration of Taggart	Director
2007	Casualty	Director - 1 episode
2009	Roy	Director - 5 episodes

== Awards and nominations ==
- 1993: Nominated for the Bafta Scotland Award for Best Single Drama for Crime Story: The Britoil Affair.
