= Transference: A Bipolar Love Story =

Transference: A Biploar Love Story
- Directed by: Raffaello Degruttola
- Written by: Raffaello Degruttola
- Produced by: Raffaello Degruttola
- Starring: Raffaello Degruttola; Emilie Sofie Johannesen; Lotte Verbeek; Simone Lahbib
- Cinematography: Phil Summers, Simon Haynes
- Edited by: Charles Lort-Philipps
- Music by: Jonathan Kerrigan
- Production company: Contro Vento Film
- Release date: 2020
- Running time: 103 min
- Country: United Kingdom
- Language: English

Transference: A Bipolar Love Story is a 2020 independent drama film directed by, produced and written by and starring Raffaello Degruttola.

Degruttola draws influence from his fraught relationship with his father, who struggled with severe bipolar disorder throughout his life.

== Plot ==
Katarina, a Norwegian nurse starts a new job in palliative care in a London hospital. When she meets an older male nurse Nik, Katrina initiates a passionate love affair that ultimately suffers the consequences of concealed mental health issues.

== Cast ==
- Raffaello Degruttola
- Emilie Sofie Johannesen
- Lotte Verbeek
- Simone Lahbib
- Christina Chong
- Ania Sowinski
- Pernille Broch
- Iggy Blanco
- Tyronne Keogh
- Reice Weathers

== Production ==
Degruttola shot the film "guerilla style" in Finchley, London and in friends' and relatives' homes.

== Reception ==
The film was released in May 2021 on YouTube, where it went viral, reaching 13 million views by late August 2022.

It was selected for the Arizona and Buenos Aires International Film Festivals. The film also received a Special Jury Mention at the 2020 New York Socially Relevant Film Festival.

On review aggregator website Rotten Tomatoes, the film has an approval rating of 90%, based on 10 reviews.
