= David Gant =

Scottish actor and model

- Born: 12 November 1942 (age 83); Scotland
- Education: Royal Scottish Academy of Music and Drama
- Occupations: Actor, model
- Years active: 1974–present
- Notable work: Braveheart (1995); Dark Souls (2011); Dark Souls II (2014); Kingsglaive: Final Fantasy XV (2016)

David Gant (born 12 November 1942) is a Scottish actor and model.

Formerly a banker, Gant changed careers at age 30 to study dramatic art at the Royal Scottish Academy of Music and Drama in Glasgow, Scotland. Graduating in 1974, he has found roles in theatre, film and television.

His credits include Coriolanus at Chichester Festival Theatre, and the films Victor/Victoria (1982), The Draughtsman's Contract (1982), The Scarlet Pimpernel (1982), Gandhi (1982), Brazil (1985), Chaplin (1992), Restoration (1995), Braveheart (1995), The Messenger: The Story of Joan of Arc (1999), Lagaan (Land Tax) (2001) and Jonathan Creek: The Sinner and the Sandman (2014). He also voiced Oswald of Carim in the 2011 video game Dark Souls and Lord Aldia in the sequel, Dark Souls II. Gant is an Associate and Licentiate of the London College of Music. Gant was the voice actor of Emperor Iedolas Aldercapt in Kingsglaive: Final Fantasy XV. For the Christmas 2016 period he plays the sheriff in the Theatre Royal Norwich production of Jack and the Beanstalk.

In 2024, he portrayed Simeon in the film Mary and cameos as the 8th Lord Smythe Bassington in Netflix series The Gentlemen.
