= John McGlynn (actor) =

Scottish actor and musician

- Born: 8 September 1953 (age 72); Scotland
- Other name: John Nicholson
- Occupations: Actor, singer, comedian, drummer, songwriter

John McGlynn (born 8 September 1953) is a Scottish actor and musician. Born John Nicholson, he was educated at the Royal High School in Edinburgh, where he was active in the dramatic society.

McGlynn's roles include that of vet Calum Buchanan in the British television series All Creatures Great and Small between January 1988 and September 1989. He also featured as DI Tom Adams in the BBC crime thriller series Silent Witness in series 1, 1996, amongst many other TV film and theatre roles.

He played Balmoral Castle's head gillie in the 2006 film The Queen.

McGlynn's debut as a professional actor was in 1975 at the Young Lyceum Theatre in Edinburgh, Scotland, in a new play, If Ye Died wi' a Face Like That, by Glaswegian writer William Grant. He was already working with the company as a drummer, contributing to the pre-recorded soundtrack for the above production. He remained with the company for the next two years, performing as an actor, drummer and singer in Cry Wolf, The Water Babies, A Midsummer Night's Dream and Under Milk Wood. He also worked as a singer/drummer/actor with the Scottish 7:84 Company in My Pal and Me and The Trembling Giant, both written by John McGrath. After 7:84 ceased operations, McGlynn was engaged by the Wildcat Stage Productions, which emerged from it, in His Master's Voice and The Complete History of Rock'n'Roll.

== Theatre ==
Year	Title	Role	Theatre	Director	Notes
1979	The Lass wi' the Muckle Mou	Willie Scott	Brunton Theatre, Musselburgh	Sandy Neilson	play by Alexander Reid

== Filmography ==
Year	Title	Role	Notes
1979	A Sense of Freedom	Prison Warder	
1982	Living Apart Together	Ritchie's band	
1990	Midnight Breaks	Breaks Drummer	
1998	Les Misérables	Carnot	
1999	Wing Commander	Richard Bellegarde	
2001	The Emperor's New Clothes	Gendarme	
2002	Gangs of New York	Bowery Boys Leader	
2004	Wimbledon	Bookmaker	
2006	The Queen	Balmoral Head Ghillie	
