= Maureen Beattie =

Scottish actress (born 1953)

Maureen Beattie OBE
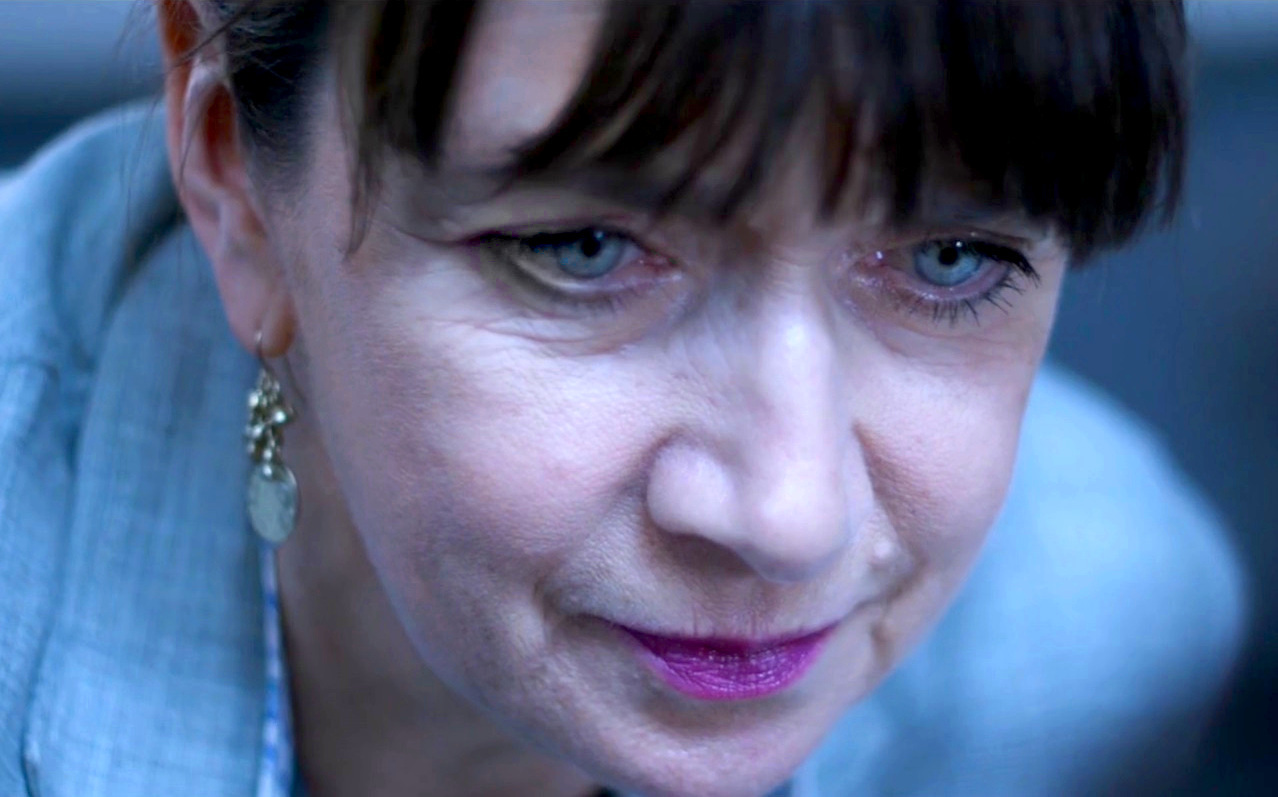
- Beattie in Spores 2016
- Born: 14 August 1953 (age 73); Bundoran, County Donegal, Ireland
- Education: Royal Conservatoire of Scotland
- Occupation: Actress
- Years active: 1974–present
- Father: Johnny Beattie

Maureen Jane Beattie OBE (born 14 August 1953) is an Irish-born Scottish actress known for her work on stage and screen.

== Early life ==
Beattie was born in Bundoran, County Donegal, on 14 August 1953, as the daughter of Scottish actor and comedian Johnny Beattie, and his wife Kitty Lamont. Her father was appearing at the town's St Patrick's Hall in a theatre production at the time of her birth. The family returned to Glasgow when she was two weeks old.

After attending High School in Glasgow, she went on to do a three-year course at the Royal Scottish Academy of Music and Dramatic Art ; she graduated in 1974 with a Diploma in Dramatic Arts, and having won the James Bridie Gold Medal for Acting during her final year.

== Career ==
After graduating, Beattie went on to play many roles in the theatre with companies across the UK including the National Theatre of Scotland, National Theatre in London, the Globe, the Royal Shakespeare Company, and the Royal Exchange in Manchester as well as touring internationally. Previous theatre credits include: The List, The Carousel, The Deliverance (Stellar Quines); John Gabriel Barclay (Óran Mór); Yer Granny, 27 and The Enquirer (National Theatre of Scotland); Romeo and Juliet (Rose Theatre Kingston); Dark Road, The Cherry Orchard (Royal Lyceum Theatre Edinburgh); Noises Off (The Old Vic); No Quarter (Royal Court Theatre); Ghosts (Citizens Theatre); The Master Builder, Othello, The Merry Wives of Windsor (National Theatre); The History Plays, Richard III, Titus Andronicus, The Lion, The Witch and The Wardrobe RSC.

She has also worked extensively in television where her roles include Casualty, Bramwell, The Bill, Ruffian Hearts, The Long Roads, Wing and a Prayer and All Night Long. Her most notable television role is that of Sandra Nicholl in medical drama Casualty from 1991 until 1993.

In 2005, she played Mrs Danvers in a national tour of Rebecca, with Nigel Havers. in 2006 she was a member of the Royal Shakespeare Company's "Histories Ensemble", where her roles included Eleanor, Duchess of Gloucester in Henry VI, Part II, and the Duchess of York in Richard III. In September 2006 she was interviewed by Sally Magnusson about life with her father for the Radio Scotland series Dad Made Me Laugh, later networked throughout the UK on BBC Radio 4 Extra. In 2007, Beattie appeared in the feature film Finding Bob McArthur as Russian actress, Svetlana. The film, also starring John Stahl, Bob Edwards and Alan Bell, was directed by Jim Hickey and produced by Robin Mitchell.

In 2008, she read part of the book Corvus: A Life with Birds for BBC Radio 4. In 2011, she played Iseabail Nic Aodh, the mother of the main character Katie Nic Aodh, in The Decoy Bride.

In 2013, she played the lead role of Isobel McArthur in Ian Rankin's debut play Dark Road.

In 2014, she played Professor Fiona Bellows in the Doctor Who, Christmas Special "Last Christmas". In 2017, Beattie joined the Young Vic cast of Federico García Lorca's Yerma.

In 2020, Beattie played Carol Kendrick in Deadwater Fell, a four-episode British television drama miniseries. In February 2022, it was confirmed that she would play Mrs Pearce in My Fair Lady at the London Coliseum, St Martin's Lane from May to August 2022. In 2022, Beattie played Tina Lawson in Our House, a four-episode British television drama miniseries.

Beattie was appointed Officer of the Order of the British Empire (OBE) in the 2020 New Year Honours for services to the entertainment industry.

== Personal life ==
Beattie is active in the actors' trade union Equity, leading their investigations into sexual harassment in the industry. In 2018, she was elected President of Equity, as only the second female president in the organisation's history.

== Acting credits ==
=== Theatre ===
Year	Title	Role	Venue	Notes
1976	Devil's Rock	Senga	Dundee Repertory Theatre	with The Rep for Young People
1984	Othello	Emilia	Lyric Studio, London	
1986	What Every Woman Knows	Maggie	Eden Court Theatre, Inverness	Scottish Theatre Company production of J. M. Barrie's comedy
1995	The Merry Wives of Windsor	Mistress Margaret Page	Olivier Theatre, London	
1997	Othello	Emilia	Cottesloe Theatre, London	also, world tour
1999	Candida	Candida	Theatre Royal, Plymouth	
2000	The Deep Blue Sea	Hester Collyer	Nottingham Playhouse	
2000	Medea	Medea	The Tramway, Glasgow	also, world tour
2001	The Lion, the Witch and the Wardrobe	White Witch	Sadler's Wells Theatre, London	with Royal Shakespeare Company
2002	Small Change	Mrs. Driscoll	Crucible Theatre, Sheffield	
2003	Titus Andronicus	Tamora	Royal Shakespeare Theatre, Stratford-upon-Avon	with Royal Shakespeare Company
2003	Richard III	Queen Elizabeth	Royal Shakespeare Theatre, Stratford-upon-Avon	with Royal Shakespeare Company
2004	The Skin of Our Teeth	Mrs. Antrobus	Young Vic, London	
2005	Rebecca	Mrs. Danvers	Theatre Royal, Newcastle	also, UK tour
2009	Ghosts	Mrs. Helen Alving	Citizens Theatre, Glasgow	
2010	The Master Builder	Aline Solness	Minerva Theatre, Chichester	
2010	The Cherry Orchard	Mrs. Ramsey	Royal Lyceum Theatre, Edinburgh	
2012	Enquirer	Ros Wynne-Jones	The Hub, Glasgow	with National Theatre of Scotland
2012	27	Ursula	Citizens Theatre, Glasgow	with National Theatre of Scotland
2012	A Midsummer Night's Dream	Various	Usher Hall, Edinburgh	with Scottish Chamber Orchestra
2013	Noises Off	Dotty Otley	The Old Vic, London	also, UK tour
2013	No Quarter	Lily	Royal Court Theatre, London	
2013	Dark Road	Isobel McArthur	Royal Lyceum Theatre, Edinburgh	
2014	The Carousel	Woman	Traverse Theatre, Edinburgh	also, Scotland tour
2015	Yer Granny	Marie	Beacon Arts Centre, Greenock	also, Scotland tour
2015	John Gabriel Barclay	Ellen	Òran Mór, Glasgow	
2016	Right Now	Juliette	Theatre Royal, Bath	also, UK tour
2017	The Winter's Tale	Paulina	Royal Lyceum Theatre, Edinburgh	
2017	The Ferryman	Aunt Maggie Far Away	Gielgud Theatre, London	
2017	nuclear war	Woman	Royal Court Theatre, London	(stylised as lowercase by author)
2017	Yerma	Helen	Young Vic, London & Park Avenue Armory, New York City	
2018	Death of a Salesman	Linda Loman	Royal Exchange, Manchester	
2019	Interference	Various	CityPark, Glasgow	with National Theatre of Scotland
2021	Go On	Jane	Tron Theatre, Glasgow	
2023	Duet for One	Dr. Feldman	Orange Tree Theatre, Richmond	
2026	Lear	Lear	Pitlochry Festival Theatre	
2026	The Prime of Miss Jean Brodie	Miss Mackay	Lyceum Theatre, Edinburgh, Citizens Theatre, Glasgow, His Majesty's Theatre, Aberdeen, Pitlochry Festival Theatre	National Theatre of Scotland in partnership with the Lyceum Theatre, Edinburgh and Pitlochry Festival Theatre

=== Film ===
Year	Title	Role	Notes
1982	People V Scott	Ms Veronica Tyler/Mrs Mavis Bush	TV film
1995	Ruffian Hearts	Beattie	TV film
1995	The Last Post	Woman	Short film
2000	The Last Musketeer	Sallie Latham	TV film
2003	Twelfth Night	Maria	TV film
2011	The Decoy Bride	Iseabail	
2014	The List	The Narrator	
2015	Standing Still	Janet Arden	Short film
2016	Dinner for One a la Netflix	Miss Sophie	Short film
2017	National Theatre Live: Yerma	Helen	TV film

=== Television ===
Year	Title	Role	Notes
1966	This Man Craig	First Girl	Episode: "Patterson"
1966	This Man Craig	Susan	Episode: "The Romantic"
1980	The Lost Tribe	Marjory	Episode: "Judgement of Solomon"
1980	Scotch and Wry	Various roles	Episode: "31 December 1980"
1981	The Walls of Jericho	Mrs. MacGregor	Episode: "Physician, Heal Thyself"
1981–1982	Maggie	Cathy Bruce	Series regular, 7 episodes
1983	Women	Jess	Episode: "Hard to Get"
1985	Taggart	June Balfour	Recurring role, 3 episodes
1985–1986	Troubles and Strife	Mary	Series regular, 13 episodes
1987	Truckers	Mary Brough	Recurring role, 4 episodes
1988	The Campbells	Lady Helen Fraser Dunham	Episode: "Lady Helen's Love"
1990	City Lights	Editor	Episode: "Scandal"
1990	The Bill	Tory Councillor	Episode: "Body Language"
1991	Boon	Stella Booth	Episode: "Stamp Duty"
1991	The Bill	Mrs. Henderson	Episode: "Your Shout"
1991–1993	Casualty	Sandra Nicholl	Series regular, 29 episodes
1992	Taggart	Margaret McLean	Episode: "Double Exposure"
1993	Screen Two	Deirdre Kopanski	Episode: "The Long Roads"
1994	The Chief	Gemma Marshall	Recurring role, 3 episodes
1994	All Night Long	Vanda	Series regular, 6 episodes
1995	The Bill	Kathleen Leigh	Episode: "Powerless"
1997	Bramwell	Alice Costigan	Series regular, 7 episodes
1999	Wing and a Prayer	Anna Crozier	Series regular, 8 episodes
1999	City Central	Leslie Troon	Episode: "Northern Soul"
2000	Taggart	Siobhan MacDonald	Episode: "Ghost Rider"
2001	Bad Girls	Marion McLoughlin	Episode: "Coming Out"
2003	The Bill	Chief Superintendent Jane Fitzwilliam	Recurring role, 9 episodes
2004	Let's Write a Story	Elizabeth Dickens	Episode: "The Personal History of Charles Dickens"
2005	The Worst Week of My Life	Toni	Recurring role, 2 episodes
2009	Doctors	Anne Mulholland	Episode: "Code of Silence"
2009	Lewis	Professor Denise Gregson	Episode: "The Quality of Mercy"
2010	Midsomer Murders	Sonia Woodley	Episode: "The Made-to-Measure Murders"
2010	Moving On	Brenda	Episode: "Letting Go"
2011	Doctors	Helen Curtis	Episodes: "You Gotta Have Faith" & "Daddy's Girl"
2013	Vera	Dr. Vivienne Ripman	Episode: "Young Gods"
2014	Doctor Who	Bellows	Episode: "Last Christmas"
2016	Outlander	Maisri	Episode: "The Fox's Lair"
2019	Doctors	Carla Bolton	Episode: "Last of the Dinosaurs"
2020	Deadwater Fell	Carol Kendrick	Mini-series, 4 episodes

=== Radio ===
Date	Title	Role	Author	Director	Station
31 March 2003 – 11 April 2003	Self-Control		Mary Brunton dramatised by Gerda Stevenson	Bruce Young	BBC Radio 4 Woman's Hour Drama
30 May 2006	Duce's Bonce		Robin Brooks	Fiona McAlpine	BBC Radio 4 Afternoon Play
27 March 2009	The Stanley Baxter Playhouse: Astonishing Archie	Rev Margot Turnbull	Bill Paterson	Marilyn Imrie	BBC Radio 4
24 April 2012	The Biggest Issues	Jill McEwan	Annie McCartney	Eoin O'Callaghan	BBC Radio 4 Afternoon Drama
