= Annie Miller =

English artists' model (1835–1925)

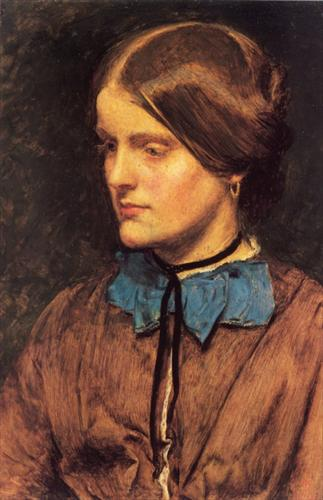
- Annie Miller, painted by John Everett Millais, 1854
- Born: 1835; Chelsea, London, England
- Died: 1925 (aged 89–90); Shoreham-by-Sea, West Sussex, England

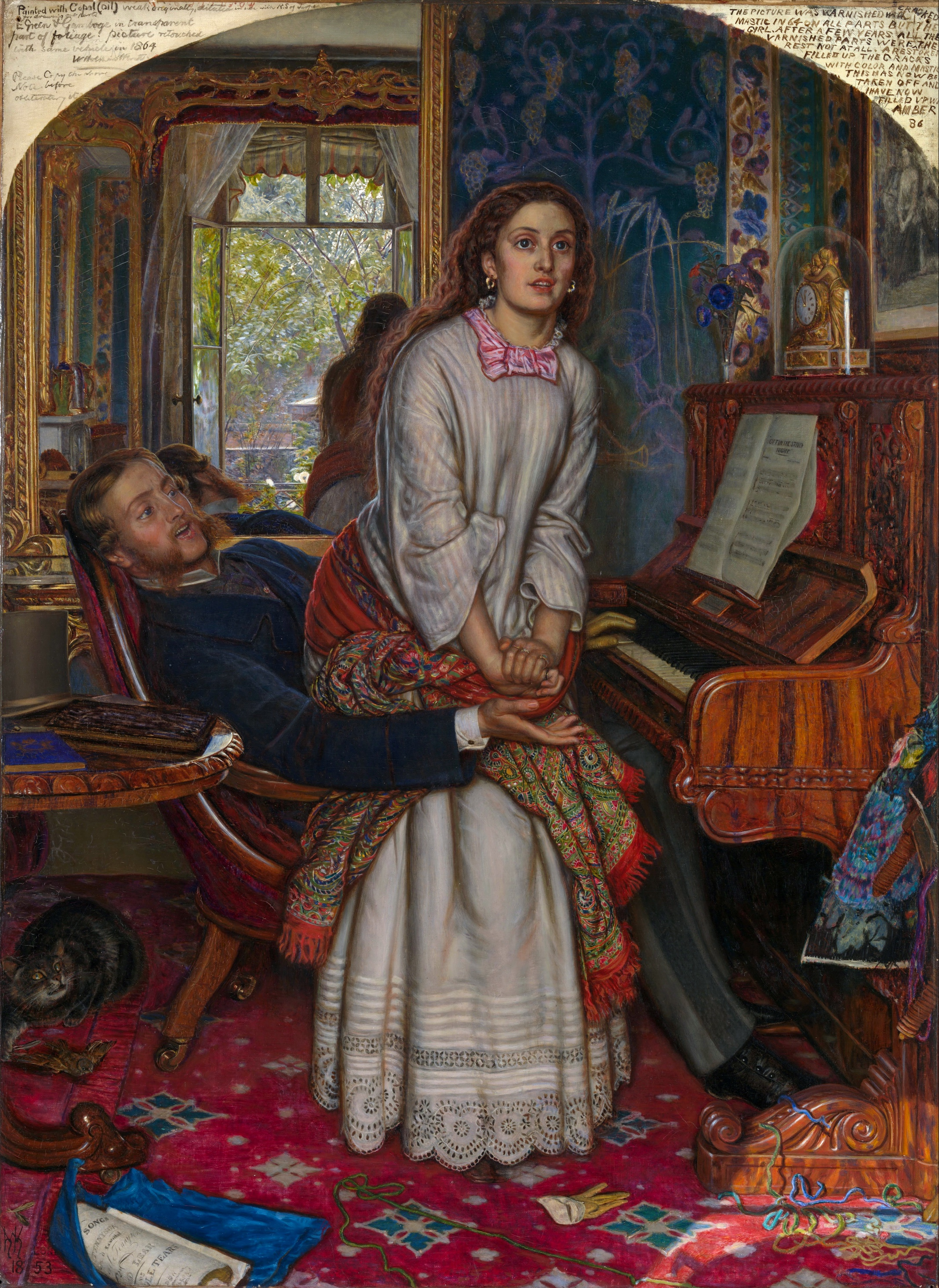
Miller is featured in The Awakening Conscience, by William Holman Hunt (1853)

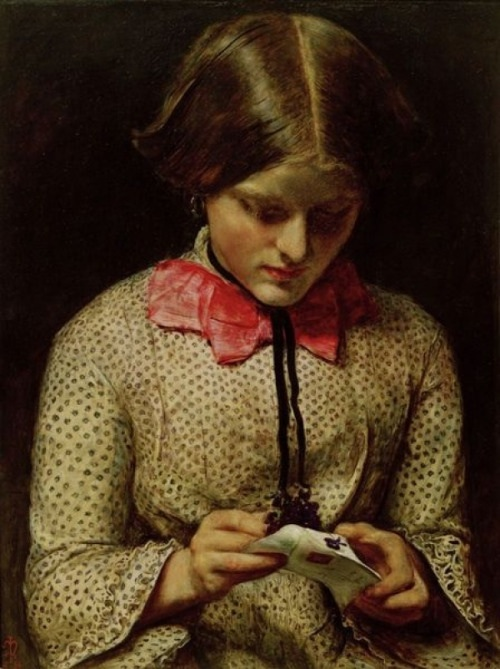
The Violet's Message by Millais, painted by Millais as a pendant (companion piece) to Annie Miller, both in 1854.

Annie Miller (1835–1925) was an English artists' model who, among others, sat for the members of the Pre-Raphaelite Brotherhood, William Holman Hunt, Dante Gabriel Rossetti and John Everett Millais. Her on-off relationship with has been dramatised several times.

== Early life ==
Annie Miller was born in 1835 in a cottage in Chelsea near the Duke of York public house. Her father Henry had been a soldier in the 14th Dragoons and was wounded in the Napoleonic Wars. Her mother was a cleaner. She had a sister Harriet. When her mother died aged thirty-seven they moved in with relatives and her father worked for a local builder.

She was working as a barmaid when she attracted the attention of Hunt.

== Pre-Raphaelite modelling ==
Miller was the subject of Hunt's 1853 painting The Awakening Conscience, though the face was later repainted by the artist. Hunt had planned to marry Miller; before he left for Palestine in 1854, he made arrangements for her to be educated while he was away. Hunt also left a list of artists, including Millais, for whom Miller could sit. During this time Millais painted The Violet's Message and Annie Miller, both with Miller as the sitter. During Hunt's absence and contrary to Hunt's wishes she also sat for George Price Boyce and for Rossetti. For Rossetti she appeared in works such as Dante's Dream on the Day of the Death of Beatrice: 9th of June, 1290 and Helen of Troy.

== Break with Hunt and marriage ==
Hunt returned from his travels in 1856. Ford Madox Brown described Annie as 'siren-like' and her connection with Rossetti caused a rift between Rossetti and Hunt. Annie became involved with the 7th Viscount Ranelagh even though Hunt proposed to her. As a result, Hunt finally broke off the engagement in 1859. Thereafter Boyce and Rossetti competed for sittings with her with Rossetti usually winning, though this caused Rossetti's wife Elizabeth Siddal on one occasion to throw his drawings of Annie out of the window.

After Hunt broke off the engagement, Annie sought help from Ranelagh, who suggested to her that she should sue Hunt for breach of promise, but eventually Ranelagh's first cousin, Captain Thomas Thomson, fell in love with her. On 16 June 1862 Boyce saw her at the International Exhibition "looking as handsome as ever, walking with a young man, rather a swell". This was probably Thomson. They married on 23 July 1863 at St Pancras Church. Thomson then suggested that they threaten to give Annie's trunk full of letters from Hunt to the newspapers. This would embarrass Hunt's family and the Waughs, his in-laws. Hunt's friends assumed that he bought back the letters.

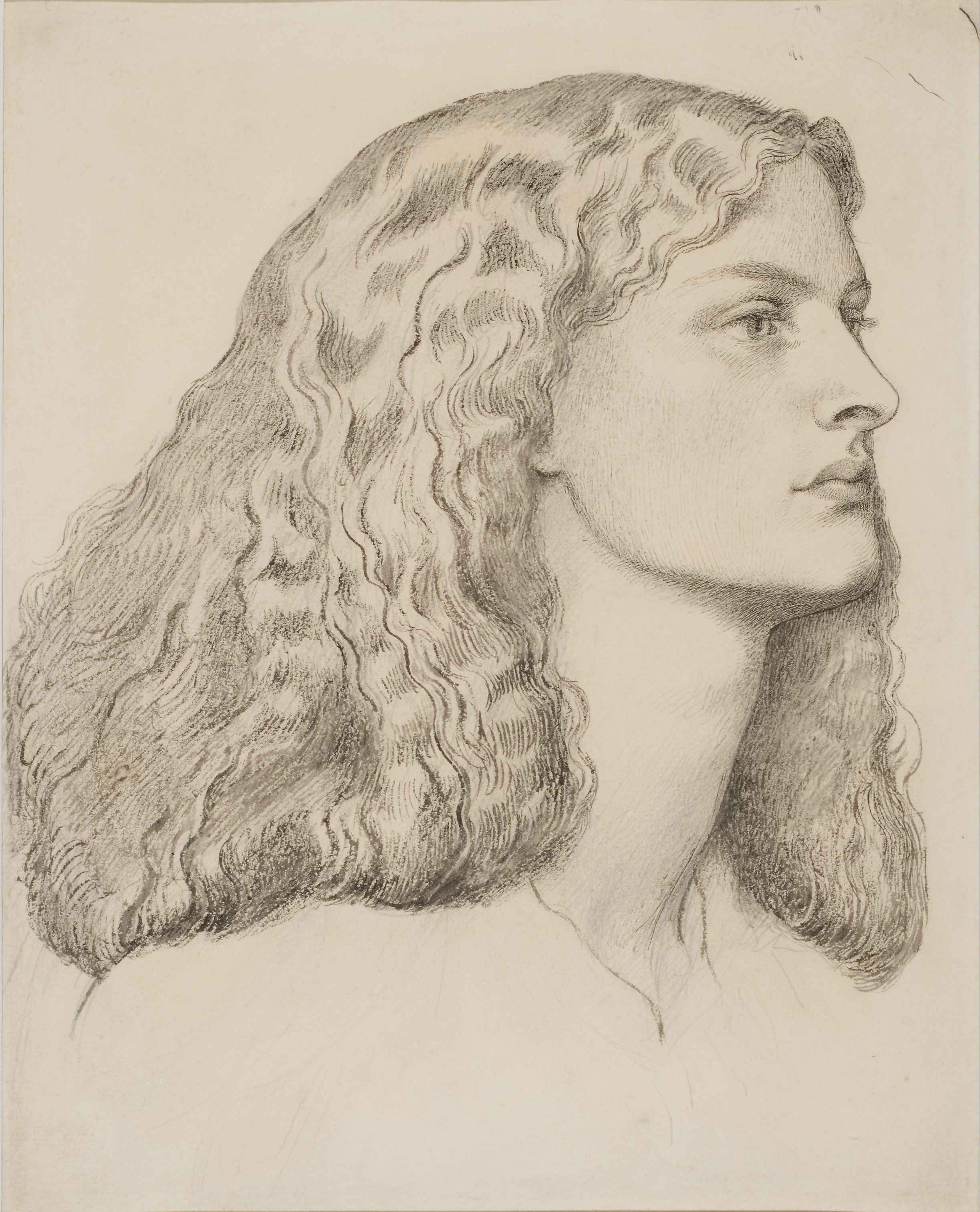
Portrait of Annie Miller by Dante Gabriel Rossetti, c. 1860

Whether or not Miller had a sexual relationship with any of her admirers before her marriage is not known. Gordon H. Fleming asserts that Ranelagh admitted to Hunt that Miller had been his mistress, but according to Jan Marsh, this might not have been the case. Marsh says that "she was undoubtedly lively, attractive and even flirtatious" and there was gossip about her relationship to Hunt. However, Marsh goes on to assert that "it may be hard to believe that she could have succeeded without the judicial use of sexual favours – to Hunt, Rossetti, Ranelagh, Thomson and maybe others – but there is no evidence to prove that she did and much, from her relationship with Hunt, to suggest her reluctance to become 'gay'. It seems to me quite possible that she remained 'pure'."

== Later life ==
On 11 October 1866 she gave birth to a daughter, Annie Helen, at Montrose House in Hampstead. In 1867 she gave birth to a son, Thomas James. She is not thought to have had more children, but years later Hunt encountered her on Richmond Hill, "a buxom matron with a carriage full of children" and learned that she was happily married. The family moved to Shoreham-by-Sea probably to be near a Thomson aunt, a Miss Sturges. Annie's husband died aged 87, at 6 Western Road, Shoreham-by-Sea, in 1916. Annie Miller lived for another 9 years after her husband's death, dying aged 90 in 1925. She is buried in Mill Lane cemetery in an unmarked grave, in plot B.19.7, next to James and Isabelle Slaughter.

== Dramatic portrayals ==
Annie Miller was played by Caroline Coon in Ken Russell's film Dante's Inferno (1967). In The Love School (1975) she was portrayed by Sheila White. Julie Cox voiced her role in Robin Brooks's trilogy of radio plays The Golden Triangle (1998). In Desperate Romantics (2009) she was played by Jennie Jacques. In the latter two dramatisations, she is depicted as a prostitute.
