= Jasmine Hyde =

English actress

- Born: Leamington Spa, England
- Education: Royal Academy of Dramatic Art
- Occupation: Actress
- Years active: 1995–present
- Known for: Hilda Rumpole in Rumpole of the Bailey; Leonie Snell in The Archers
- Children: 1

Jasmine Hyde is an English actress who has appeared on stage, radio, film and television. Hyde is best known for playing the young "Hilda Rumpole" in BBC Radio 4's Rumpole of the Bailey between 2009 and 2019, and "Leonie Snell" in The Archers (2014–19). Her television roles include Doctors, Father Brown, Beyond Paradise, Casualty, Holby City, Coronation Street, and Murder in Provence. In 2017, she played the lead role in Gary Sinyor’s psychological thriller The Unseen.

== Early career ==
Born in Leamington Spa, Hyde graduated from RADA in 2000. She won the BBC Carleton Hobbs Award for Radio the same year, resulting in a six month contract on the BBC radio drama rep company as her first job.

== Film ==
She made her film debut as a Courtesan in Restoration (1995); played a supporting role in the Anglo-Indian drama A Distant Mirage (2008), and starred in her first lead role in 2017's The Unseen, followed by appearances in Angel Has Fallen (2019), and Wonder Woman 1984 (2020).

== Television ==
Hyde's television career began on the BBC in 2004 on the Casualty episode "What Parents Do," followed by a second appearance in 2009.

She has since appeared in The Truth Commissioner (2016), Holby City (2017), Coronation Street (2018), Good Omens (2019), Doctors (3 episodes in 2017 and 2019), Hapless (2020), The Lazarus Project (2022), played political journalist Pippa Crerar in This England (2022), Murder in Provence (2022), Tell Me Everything (2022) as well as roles in the Father Brown episode "Gardeners of Eden" (2023), and episode 3 of the second series of Beyond Paradise (2024). She was cast as Herodias in Fox Nation's Jesus Crown of Thorns (2025).

== Theatre ==
Hyde's first theatre job was playing Madeleine in the Paines Plough/Frantic Assembly production of Abi Morgan's Tiny Dynamite directed by Vicky Featherstone in 2001. She then moved to the Royal National Theatre to appear in Sir Tom Stoppard’s trilogy The Coast of Utopia directed by Sir Trevor Nunn.

Further credits include the Royal Shakespeare Company's production of Pericles (2003), Waters of the Moon at the Salisbury Playhouse (2004), the Globe's touring production of A Midsummer Night's Dream (2010), Statements After An Arrest Under The Immorality Act at the Jermyn Street Theatre (2014), as well as Not Moses at The Princess Arts Theatre (directed by Gary Sinyor; 2016).

In May 2017, Hyde starred as Bella in Matt Parvin's JAM opposite Harry Melling. In 2020 she appeared as Anna in The Arcola's production of The Cutting Edge at the Finsborough Theatre in 2023. written and directed by Jack Shepherd. She also performed in the third play of the trilogy Knocking On The Wall.

== Radio ==
Hyde has appeared in over 100 radio plays from 2000 to the present, mainly for the BBC, showcasing her versatility from Shakespearean drama to comedy. These include her longest running role as the young "Hilda Rumpole", in Rumple Of The Bailey (2009–19; opposite Benedict Cumberbatch and later Julian Rhind-Tutt). She had a recurring role as the feisty "Leonie Snell" in The Archers (2014–19), and appeared in all 5 series of The Corrupted opposite Toby Jones (2013–21).

More recent productions include Little Blue Lines (2021), Rossum's Universal Robots (2022), Mr. Wilder and Me (BBC Radio 4's Book of the Week; 2022), and Shell Seekers (2024).

Date	Title	Role	Author	Director	Station
April 2001	Little Dorrit	Little Dorrit	Charles Dickens dramatised by Doug Lucie	Janet Whitaker	BBC Radio 4 Classic Serial
20 July 2003	Caesar! – Series 1, "The Arena"	Livia	Mike Walker	Jeremy Mortimer	BBC Radio 4
7 March 2005	Scenes of Seduction	Katherine	Timberlake Wertenbaker	Ned Chaillet	BBC Radio 4 Afternoon Play
23 May 2005	The Last Days of Gordon Springer	Linda	Richard Stevens	Fiona McAlpine	BBC Radio 4 Afternoon Play
23 September 2006 – 30 September 2006	Lady Chatterley's Lover		D H Lawrence dramatised by Michelene Wandor	Marilyn Imrie	BBC Radio 4 Classic Serial
12 August 2007 – 19 August 2007	The Card		Arnold Bennett dramatised by Jennifer Howarth	Marilyn Imrie	BBC Radio 4 Classic Serial
19 May 2009 – 26 May 2009	Rumpole and the Penge Bungalow Murders	Hilda Wystan (young, before marrying Rumpole)	John Mortimer adapted by Richard Stoneman	Marilyn Imrie	BBC Radio 4 Afternoon Play
11 June 2009	Taken	Sarah	Suzanne Heathcote	Carl Prekopp	BBC Radio 4 Afternoon Play
20 March 2011 – 27 March 2011	The Lost World	Dr Diana Summerlee	Arthur Conan Doyle dramatised by Chris Harrald	Marilyn Imrie	BBC Radio 4 Classic Serial
1 March 2012	Rumpole and the Man of God	Hilda Rumpole	John Mortimer adapted by Richard Stoneman	Marilyn Imrie	BBC Radio 4 Afternoon Play
2 March 2012	Rumpole and the Explosive Evidence	Hilda Rumpole	John Mortimer adapted by Richard Stoneman	Marilyn Imrie	BBC Radio 4 Afternoon Play
18 December 2012	Rumpole and the Gentle Art of Blackmail	Hilda Rumpole	John Mortimer adapted by Richard Stoneman	Marilyn Imrie	BBC Radio 4 Afternoon Play
25 December 2012	Rumpole and the Expert Witness	Hilda Rumpole	John Mortimer adapted by Richard Stoneman	Marilyn Imrie	BBC Radio 4 Afternoon Play
20 March 2014	Rumpole and the Old Boy Net	Hilda Rumpole	John Mortimer adapted by Richard Stoneman	Marilyn Imrie	BBC Radio 4 Afternoon Play
21 March 2014	Rumpole and the Sleeping Partners	Hilda Rumpole	John Mortimer adapted by Richard Stoneman	Marilyn Imrie	BBC Radio 4 Afternoon Play
2013 – 2019	The Archers	Leonie Snell			
28 March 2016	Rumpole on Trial	Hilda Rumpole	John Mortimer adapted by Richard Stoneman	Marilyn Imrie	BBC Radio 4 Afternoon Play
29 March 2016	Rumpole And Hilda	Hilda Rumpole	John Mortimer adapted by Richard Stoneman	Marilyn Imrie	BBC Radio 4 Afternoon Play
21 October 2013 - 20 May 2021	The Corrupted (5 series)	Leah	G. F. Newman	Clive Brill	BBC Radio 4
22 February 2021	Little Blue Lines	Amy	Kate Rawson	Gemma Jenkins	BBC Radio 4
30 May 2022	Mr Wilder and Me	Narrator (plus all characters)	Jonathan Coe	Clive Brill	Brill Productions for BBC Radio 4
14 April 2024	The Shell Seekers	Nancy	Rosamunde Pilcher (dramatised by Lin Coghlan)	Tracey Neale	BBC Radio 4
16 November 2025	The Wind in the Willows: A Weasel's Tale	Radar the bat	Tom Morton-Smith	Sasha Yevtushenko	BBC Radio 4

== Music ==
Hyde contributed spoken word to “As One,” “Wastelands”, and “Tides” on Suede's 2018 album "The Blue Hour" which reached No.5 in the UK charts. "Wastelands" was released as the fifth and final single from the album in October 2018.

== Audiobooks ==
Hyde has contributed to a wide range of audiobooks including Hellboy (A Plague Of Wasps) (2023).

== Awards ==
- 2000 Winner of the BBC Carleton Hobbs Award for Radio.
- 2019 Winner of the Festival Director's Choice Award for Best Actress for The Unseen at the Idyllwild International Festival.
- 2019 Winner of the Grace Kelly Gold Award for Best Actress for The Unseen at the West Coast International Film Festival.
- 2022 Commendation Award for Little Blue Lines at the BBC Audio Drama Awards.

== Personal life ==
Hyde is married and has a son.
