= Corvus: A Life with Birds =

2008 non-fiction book by Esther Woolfson

- Book cover
- Author: Esther Woolfson
- Audio read by: Maureen Beattie
- Language: English
- Genre: Non-fiction
- Published: 2008
- Publisher: Granta
- Publication place: Scotland
- Pages: 337
- ISBN: 9781847080295

Corvus: A Life With Birds by Esther Woolfson is a non-fiction book about a family which adopts various corvids; a rook named Chicken, a magpie named Spike, and a crow named Ziki. It is Woolfson's first book.

== Plot ==
The book details the family's bird rescues, mostly consisting of crows. The rook Chicken was adopted by Woolfson as a fledgling and she began feeding the bird a diet of minced meat, eggs, and nuts. Chicken's full name is Madame Chickeboumskaya, after an American drag queen. Chicken has a habit of hoarding food in boot laces, using a table to incubate infertile eggs, and following Woolfson around the house. The rook is able to go wherever she wants to in the house and she "sleeps, bathes, roosts, and preens" in Woolfson's office. Chicken acts similar to a cat or dog and was 18 years old when the book was written. Woolfson's life with Spike, Ziki, and other birds are documented. Interspersed in the book is information about bird experts and the science about the birds.

== Reception ==
Katheen Yale of Orion Magazine said, "As human and wildlife habitats continue to overlap in a struggle for resources, Haupt’s Crow Planet and Woolfson’s Corvus both question, then show us, how to coexist with what Haupt calls "this slight discomfort." And even how to "rejoice in its meaning."" Jennl Frazer of The Jewish Chronicle wrote that "Woolfson's gentle, humorous prose style offers a delightful insight into an unfamiliar world, and if in the mix she throws in a little medieval history here, and a little environmental science there, it's all to the good." Tim Dee of The Guardian gave a mixed review concluding with, "By the end, much as I had enjoyed this book, I was egging on the hawks."

Maureen Beattie read part of the book in five BBC Radio 4 episodes in 2008 as Book of the Week.
