= Caesar! =

Set of British radio plays

Caesar! is a set of British radio plays set in ancient Rome and written by Mike Walker for the Classic Serial strand. The first series (premiered in 2003) was based on Suetonius's Lives of the Caesars - later series covered later emperors.

== Series ==
=== Series 1 ===
1. Meeting at Formiae - 13 July 2003 - On Julius Caesar (David Troughton) and his dealings with Cicero (Anton Lesser) and Cato the Younger (Stephen Critchlow)
2. The Arena - 20 July 2003 - On the early career of Octavian (Adam Levy), also featuring Jasmine Hyde as Livia and with Richard Johnson as the remembering adult Augustus
3. Peeling Figs for Julius - 27 July 2003 - On Caligula (David Tennant), also featuring George Baker as Tiberius, whom he had previously played in I, Claudius.

=== Series 2 ===
1. The Best of Mothers - 17 July 2005 - On Nero (Jonathan Forbes) and his mother Agrippina the Younger (Frances Barber)
2. The Glass Ball Game - 24 July 2005 - On Hadrian (Jonathan Hyde) and his relationship with his lover Antinous (Andrew Garfield), his wife Sabina (Amanda Root) and the historian Suetonius (Jonathan Coy)
3. Citizens in a Great City - 31 July 2005 - On the reigns of Marcus Aurelius (Ronald Pickup), Commodus (Jim Sturgess) and Septimius Severus (Ray Fearon), also featuring Severus' wife Julia Domna (Helen McCrory).

=== Series 3 ===
1. Empress in the West - 25 February 2007 - On the life of Victoria (Barbara Flynn) and the Gallic Empire under the rule of Postumus (Danny Webb) and her son Victorinus (Sam Troughton)
2. The Maker of All Things - 4 March 2007 - On Constantine the Great (Sam Dale) and his son Crispus (Joseph Kloska), also featuring Constantine's second wife Fausta (Christine Kavanaugh)
3. An Empire Without End - 11 March 2007 - On Romulus Augustulus (Tom Hiddleston)

== Sources ==
- bbc.co.uk
- bbc.co.uk
