= Jon Canter =

English television comedy writer

Jon Canter is an English television comedy writer for Lenny Henry and other leading comedians. Canter was born and brought up in the Jewish community of Golders Green, North London and studied law at the University of Cambridge, where he became President of Footlights.

After a spell in advertising, copywriting (and as a housemate of Douglas Adams) he became a freelance comedy writer, setting up home in Aldeburgh with his wife, painter Helen Napper. He became a principal writer for the comedian Lenny Henry, also writing for Dawn French, Angus Deayton, Mel Smith and Griff Rhys Jones, as well as script editor for Stephen Fry and Hugh Laurie. He co-wrote the 2003 BBC television satirical comedy Posh Nosh with the co-star Arabella Weir; and the BBC Radio 4 situation comedy Believe It! and, with Guy Jenkin, Legal, Decent, Honest and Truthful. He wrote a Radio 4 Afternoon Play, I Love Stephen Fry in 2008; and in 2017 Radio 4 broadcast the short series Homes and Watford in its 15 Minute Drama slot. His comedy Boswell's Lives (starring Miles Jupp) ran on BBC Radio 4 for four series, 2015–2018. He wrote for the ITV animated cartoon version of Mr. Bean.

His first novel, Seeds of Greatness, a comic story inspired by his upbringing, was published in 2006 (ISBN 978-0-224-07773-6), and was abridged by Fiona McAlpine as a BBC Radio 4 Book at Bedtime. His subsequent novels have been A Short Gentleman (2008) and Worth (2011). An adaptation of A Short Gentleman was first broadcast on BBC Radio 4 in January 2012.

Since 2008, he has been a regular contributor to The Guardian's comment pages. In 2014, The Rev. Diaries was published: this was based on the TV programme starring Tom Hollander, and was written with help from Hollander and James Wood.
