= Spriguns of Tolgus =

- Origin: England
- Genre: British folk rock - folk music
- Years active: 1972-78
- Past members: See: Band members section

Spriguns of Tolgus (aka Spriguns) were a British folk rock group formed in 1972. They managed to obtain a record deal with a major label and the attention of some significant figures in the folk rock world. They produced four albums with growing originality and recognition but were unable to achieve mainstream success and disbanded in 1978. Their lead singer, Mandy Morton, continued her solo career in Scandinavia and the band have now obtained a cult following.

== History ==
=== Origins ===
Mike and Mandy Morton formed Spriguns of Tolgus as an acoustic duo at a folk night at the Anchor pub in Cambridge, England, in 1972. They took the name "Spriguns" from a malignant Cornish pixie and Tolgus from a tin mine in Cornwall. Initially the band relied on traditional songs, particularly ballads, from England, Scotland and Ireland and were similar in sound to Steeleye Span.

The Mortons, with Mandy on vocals and Mike on bass, were joined by Rick Thomas (fiddle) and Chris Russon (electric guitar), producing soft-focus electric folk on a self-financed tape recording, Rowdy, Dowdy Day (1974). This drew them to the attention of Steeleye Span's Tim Hart, who produced their first vinyl album, Jack with a Feather (1975), contributing the song "Seamus the Showman", beside traditional material such as the Child Ballads's "Flodden Field" and "The Twa Magicians" (the last of which Steeleye Span had recorded the year before) and the Irish songs "Let No Man Steal Your Thyme" and "Curragh of Kildare". The album, despite a very short run of pressings, together with Hart's involvement, helped increase the band's profile sufficiently to gain attention from a major label.

=== Decca albums: 1976-77 ===
In 1976 they signed with Decca, shortened their name to Spriguns and recruited a new band of Dick Powell (keyboards), Tom Ling (fiddle), and Chris Woodcock (drums), which gave them a fuller and rockier sound. The resulting album Revel, Weird & Wild (1976), with B. J. Cole on pedal steel, was again produced by Tim Hart. It relied exclusively on material penned by the band, particularly by Mandy Morton, but many of these were reworkings of traditional material.

For the next album Time Will Pass (1977) only Powell and Ling were retained and Australians Wayne Morrison (guitar) and Dennis Dunstan (drums) were recruited. This was a relatively lavish attempt to break through into the mainstream, with orchestral arrangements undertaken by Robert Kirby, who had worked with Nick Drake and the Strawbs, and production by Sandy Roberton, who had overseen Steeleye Span's early folk albums. The band now sounded very much like a conventional rock outfit with folk overtones and Mandy Morton was the only songwriter.

=== Magic Lady ===
The Mortons left Decca in 1977 for reasons that remain unclear and established their own label, Banshee Records, in 1978. A new band was formed, retaining Tom Ling but adding Byron Giles (guitar) and Alex Cooper (drums, later of Katrina And The Waves). Mandy Morton became the group's focus and their last album under the name Spriguns was Magic Lady (1978), credited to ‘Mandy Morton and Spriguns’. The album's title was a tribute to Sandy Denny, who died during recording and as a result the content was similar in style to Denny's solo work. It was recorded at Spaceward Studios, produced by Mike Kemp and benefited from guest appearances by several respected figures in the electric folk world, including a return for Tim Hart on dulcimer and backing vocals and guitar work from former Gryphon instrumentalist Graeme Taylor. This last album is generally considered the finest work the band produced.

=== After Spriguns ===
In 1979, Mandy Morton signed for Polydor Scandinavia, gradually moving away from her folk roots and, in the 1980s, touring with a conventional rock band. She has said that, following the decline in popularity of folk music in the UK, "we discovered after we’d been offered a residency in Oslo for the summer in 78 that there was a whole new world for us in Scandinavia. They were about three or four years behind the music scene in England. Therefore, they were still enjoying the hippie and progressive folk rock music, and so we toured Norway, Denmark and in Sweden. It felt like a rebirth of the band, rather than us sort of falling down like an awful lot of the bands did in this country".

She produced the album Sea Of Storms (1979) before Mike and Mandy split and Mike returned to Cambridge, where he died unexpectedly in his forties in 1995. After producing Valley Of Light for Banshee in 1983, Mandy returned to England to work for BBC Radio Cambridgeshire in 1986. Dick Powell is the leader of Cambridge band The Melodybeats, and is writing songs and poetry and short stories and released a CD of songs about Cambridge in 2018. The CD featured local artistes and was called Cambridge Skies and can be found on eBay under that title. Tom Ling plays in Cambridge bands. Wayne Morrison and Dennis Dunstan are back home in Australia having fleetingly lived in California where Dennis worked for Fleetwood Mac for some time as Head of Security.

Mandy Morton writes the No.2 Feline Detective Agency series and lives in Cambridge and Cornwall with her partner, the novelist Nicola Upson.

== Style and significance ==
Mandy Morton's song writing and fey laid-back singing was central to the sound of the band. Initially they seemed to be a clone of Steeleye Span, but the greater experimentation, production values and confidence of the later work, in which Mandy Morton began to produce her own material, is closer to bands like Trees or Mellow Candle in style, relying on long guitar solos, similar to those of some progressive rock bands. The material was often dark in nature, focusing on black magic, war and death, which prefigured the obsessions of some later dark wave bands. Their rare albums became particularly sought after by record collectors and began to be re-released as CDs from the 1990s.

== Band members ==
=== Spriguns of Tolgus: original line-up ===
- Mandy Morton (vocals, 12 string guitar, dulcimer, bongos)
- Mike Morton (bass guitar, vocals)
- Chris Russon (electric guitar, acoustic guitar, mandolin, 12 string guitar)
- Rick Thomas (vocals, acoustic guitar, mandolin, dulcimer)

=== Spriguns: later members ===
- Thom Ling (electric and acoustic violins, harpsichord)
- Dick Powell (electric guitar, keyboards, vocals)
- Chris Woodcock (drums)
- B. J. Cole (pedal steel)
- Dennis Dunstan (drums)
- Wayne Morrison (lead guitar, acoustic guitar, mandolin and vocals)
- Alex Cooper (drums and percussion)
- Byron Giles (electric and acoustic guitars, vocals)
- Lea Nicholson (concertina)
- Dominic Green (drums)
- Mark Boettcher (electric guitar, vocals)
- Vince De La Cruz (electric and acoustic guitars, bass, vocals, later of Katrina And The Waves)

== Discography ==
=== Albums ===
- Rowdy, Dowdy Day (Private pressing, 1974) (tape)
- Jack With A Feather (Alida Star, 1975)
- Revel, Weird & Wild (Decca, 1976)
- Time Will Pass (Decca, 1977)
- Magic Lady (Banshee, 1978)

=== Mandy Morton ===
- Sea of Storms (Polydor, 1979)
- Valley of Light (Banshee, 1983)
