= Annie Miller (Millais painting) =

Painting by John Everett Millais

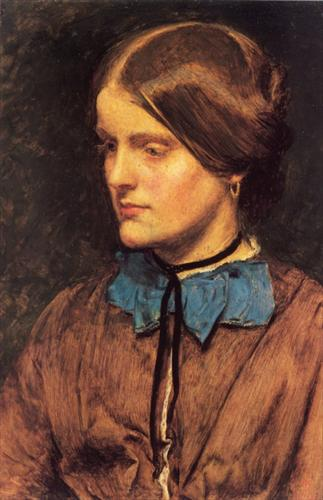
- Artist: John Everett Millais
- Year: 1854
- Type: Oil on panel
- Dimensions: 22.7 cm × 14.9 cm (8.9 in × 5.9 in)
- Location: Private collection: Harry Oppenheimer Collection

Annie Miller is an 1854 oil painting by the English artist John Everett Millais. It shows a woman in a dress with a black ribbon choker and a blue bow at her neck, looking down to her right. The model was Annie Miller, a famous model of the Pre-Raphaelite artists.

== The painting ==
Miller had been in a close artistic and personal relationship with the artist William Holman Hunt, and when he left England for the Holy Land in January 1854 Hunt left Miller with a list of artists for whom he would allow Miller to pose as a model. Millais was one of the artists on the list (although Miller rightly ignored Hunt's strictures and posed as she liked, including for the 'banned' Dante Gabriel Rossetti).

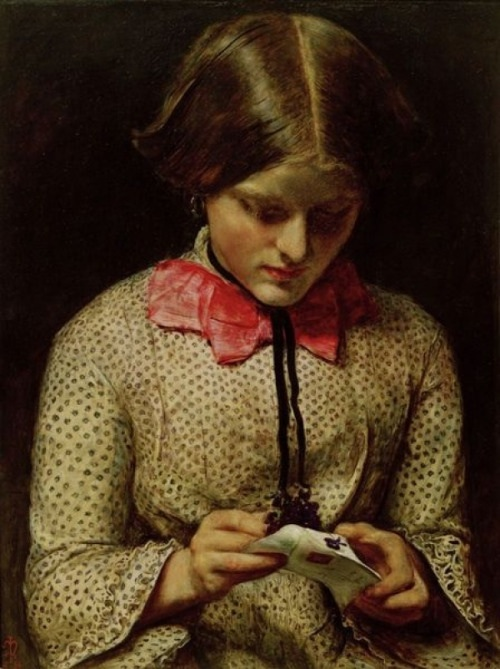
The Violet's Message by Millais, painted by Millais as a pendant to Annie Miller, both in 1854.

Millais painted Miller in two pendant (companion) portraits in 1854, both with Miller as the sitter: The Violet's Message and this portrait. There are similarities in the dress in the two paintings: the black ribbon choker around the neck, and the bow around the neck (though of differing colours). It is thought that the two paintings were painted 'probably simultaneously' in April or May 1854.

The painting is in a private collection; its most recently known location was the Harry Oppenheimer Collection.

== See also ==
- List of paintings by John Everett Millais
