= Robin Brooks =

British radio dramatist (born 1961)

Robin Brooks (born 1961) is a British radio dramatist, actor, and author.

== Selected credits ==
=== Adaptations ===
- 2000 – The Art of Love, a comedy, emphasizing Ovid's role as lover, with Bill Nighy and Anne-Marie Duff
- 2004 – Mort by Terry Pratchett
- 2006 – Small Gods by Terry Pratchett
- 2008 – An Expert in Murder by Nicola Upson
- 2008 – Night Watch by Terry Pratchett
- 2009 – Armadale by Wilkie Collins
- 2010 – I, Claudius by Robert Graves
- 2012 – Ulysses by James Joyce
- 2012 – Mary Stuart by Friedrich Schiller
- 2013 – Eric by Terry Pratchett
- 2013 – "Jill" by Philip Larkin
- 2019 – One Day in the Life of Ivan Denisovich by Aleksandr Solzhenitsyn
- 2025 – Quartered Safe Out Here by George MacDonald Fraser

=== Plays ===
- 1998 – The Golden Triangle – a trilogy on the lives of the Pre-Raphaelite Brotherhood, consisting of:
  - The Awakening Conscience (on William Holman Hunt and his model Annie Miller, taking its title from Hunt's painting of the same name)
  - The Order of Release (on John Everett Millais, John Ruskin and Effie Gray, named after Millais's painting of the same name)
  - Love Among The Ruins (on Edward Burne-Jones and Maria Zambaco, named after Burne-Jones's painting of the same name)
- 2003 – The Smallest Man in Christendom
- 2006 – Duce's Bonce
- 2007 – A Warning to the Furious
- 2018 – 4/4: Introduction and Allegro
- 2018 – 4/4: Rondo Mysterioso
- 2020 – Elizabeth and Essex
- 2025 – James Blades - Pandemonium of the One-Man Band (with James Anthony-Rose)

== External Sources ==
- Robin Brooks
