= Fiona McAlpine =

Fiona McAlpine is a British radio drama producer and director. Her company, Allegra Productions, is an independent production company based in Suffolk, England.

== Works ==
Current Production on BBC Radio 4. Broadcast 11, 18 April April – 25 April 2021 The Magic Mountain by Thomas Mann Dramatised by Robin Brooks Based on the Translation by John E. Woods CAST Luke Thallon, Lucy Robinson, Hugh Skinner, Genevieve Gaunt, Sandy Grierson, Stephen Hogan, Keziah Joseph, Georgina Strawson, Ed Jones, Huw Brentnall, Kate Paul, Georgia Brown, Lilit Lesser.

== Dramas produced and directed by Fiona McAlpine in 2015–2021 ==
- Kingmaker: Winter Pilgrims by Gregory Evans for Towton Audio 5 hour episodes.

Launched by Towton Audio on 29 March 2021

- The Brummie Iliad for BBC Radio 3 by Roderick Smith (based on Homer's Iliad)

Broadcast 31 January 2021

- USA by John Dos Passos for BBC Radio 4 - (3 episodes)

Broadcast October to November 2020

- The Talking Mongoose for BBC Radio 4

Broadcast 3 June 2020

- Elizabeth and Essex by Robin Brooks for BBC Radio 3 with Simon Russell Beale and the BBC Concert Orchestra

Live performance at the Alexandra Palace on 3 Feb 2020 Broadcast on Radio 3 "Drama on 3" 12 April 2020.

- The Garrick Year by Margaret Drabble adapted by Robin Brooks with Melody Grove, Tom Burke, Trystan Gravelle

Broadcast 5 April 2020

- A Kestrel for a Knave by Barry Hines, adapted by Robert Rigby for Goldhawk Essential and BBC Radio 4

Broadcast September 2019

- Get Carter: The Bloody Chamber by Angela Carter, adapted by Olivia Hetreed for BBC Radio 4

Broadcast Sept 2018

- Get Carter: The Christchurch Murder (screenplay by Angela Carter) adapted by Robin Brooks for BBC Radio 4

Broadcast Sept 2018

- Vampirella by Angela Carter for BBC Radio 3
- Come unto these Yellow Sands (producer only) for BBC Radio 3

Both plays as part of 'An Evening with Angela Carter', starring Fiona Shaw as Angela Carter Broadcast Sept 2018

- Byzantium by Robin Brooks for BBC Radio 3

Broadcast March 2018

- Remorse, or the sorrows of Samuel Taylor Coleridge, by Robin Brooks (directed by Jeremy Mortimer)

Broadcast March 2016

- The Dark Tower by Louis MacNeice and music by Benjamin Britten (producer only) with the BBC Concert Orchestra

Performed live in front of an audience at Orford Church, Suffolk Broadcast on BBC Radio 3 Oct 2017

- Iris Murdoch: Dream Girl by Robin Brooks, with Helen McCrory, Anton Lesser, Jasper Britton for BBC Radio 4

Broadcast August 2015

- The Sea, The Sea, by Iris Murdoch, dramatised by Robin Brooks, directed by Bill Alexander, Produced by Fiona McAlpine

with Jeremy Irons, Simon Williams, Joanna David, Sara Kestelman. Broadcast August 2015

- The Boy from Aleppo who painted the War by Richard Kurti and Bev Doyle for B7 Productions and BBC Radio 4

Broadcast Sept 2014

Then see table below: from 2003 to 2013

Missed out from table below (2001 and 2003)

2001 - Love and Friendship by Jane Austen, Adapted by Robin Brooks Produced & Directed by Fiona McAlpine, Exec. Producer: Clive Brill (Pacificus Productions) for BBC Radio 4 Afternoon drama Cast: David Tennant, Victoria Hamilton, David Horovitch, Janet Jeffries.

2003 - 7 August A Quick Change by Robin Brooks Produced and Directed by Fiona McAlpine, Exec. Producer : Clive Brill (Pacificus productions), for BBC Radio 4 Cast: David Tennant, Ashley Jenson, Flora Montgomery, Alan Cox, Raza Jaffrey, Mark Spalding, Barbara Dryhurst, Jonathan Tafler

Theatre: Directed and Produced Britten's Got Talent a new play about Benjamin Britten by Robin Brooks at the New Wolsey Studio, 2013. with Keith Hill, Jonathan Hansler, Sam Dale, Gilian Cally, Joseph Reed, Theo Christie, Sam Bell Music by Matthew Sheeran, Songs by Damian Evans, Choreography by Louisa McAlpine

Abridgement: She also abridges books and stories for radio.

Fiona McAlpine directed Duce's Bonce about her great-aunt the Irish aristocrat Hon. Violet Gibson who tried to assassinate Benito Mussolini in 1926, and Jon Canter's I Love Stephen Fry in which Stephen Fry played a cameo role.

Fiona McAlpine has abridged for radio:

- In Cold Blood by Truman Capote
- Seeds of Greatness by Jon Canter
- The Rapture by Liz Jensen
- Enoch's Two Letters by Alan Sillitoe
- No Name in the Street by Alan Sillitoe
- The Caller by Alan Sillitoe
- The Story of a Marriage by Andrew Sean Greer

== Radio plays ==
Radio Plays Directed or Produced by Fiona McAlpine
Date first broadcast	Play	Author	Cast	Synopsis Awards	Station Series
2003-12-26	The Smallest Man in Christendom	Robin Brooks	Lucy Robinson, David Holt, Desmond Barrit, Alan Cox, Charlie Simpson, Julie Cox, John McAndrew, Terry Smith, Felix Still and Tom Raphael Eaves	This Christmas entertainment tells the true story of Jeffrey Hudson whose extraordinary adventures are celebrated in a masque. His presentation in a pie to King Charles I and Queen Henrietta Maria, his daring exploits in the Civil War, and his astonishing fate, are acted out by a motley cast in Radio Drama's virtual theatre.	BBC Radio 4 Afternoon Play
2005-05-23	The Last Days of Gordon Springer	Richard Stevens	Alicya Eyo, Regina Freedman, Lara Haworth, David Horovitch, Jasmine Hyde, Stephen Mangan, Catherine Shepherd and Karl Theobald	Gordon Springer has an almost God-like power over the office network. He can tap into any of his colleagues' personal secrets whenever he likes – because he is the IT manager.	BBC Radio 4 Afternoon Play
2006-05-30	Duce's Bonce	Robin Brooks	Catherine McCormack, Maureen Beattie, Adrian Rawlins, Nicholas Woodeson and Sarah Eedle	By 1956, the Hon Violet Gibson has been in an asylum for over 20 years – and she seems finally to have lost touch with reality. Half the time she doesn't know who the Prime Minister is, and she has this mad idea that she shot Benito Mussolini. Based on a true story.	BBC Radio 4 Afternoon Play
2007-12-28	A Warning to the Furious	Robin Brooks	Lucy Robinson, Catherine Shepherd, Carl Prekopp, Gerard McDermott and Andrew Wincott	A feminist film-maker and her crew visit the Suffolk coast to make a documentary about ghost story writer MR James. They hope to discover how an outwardly respectable bachelor could produce such disturbing horrors.	BBC Radio 4 Afternoon Play
2008-07-03	I Love Stephen Fry	Jon Canter	Stephen Fry, Lesley Sharp, Phil Davis, Carolyn Pickles, Ron Cook, Sinead Matthews and Karl Theobald	Jackie, a woman with a midlife crisis and a snoring husband, starts to fantasise about other men. In her dreams, Jackie is in love with Stephen Fry – who is everything her husband is not: eloquent, metropolitan, learned and gay. But what does Stephen think and should she tell him she loves him?	BBC Radio 4 Afternoon Play
2008-08-07	Left at Marrakech	Richard Stevens	Will Keen, Jonathan Cullen, Clare Corbett, Alan Cox, Nicholas Rowe and Ben Lewis	In 1943, a B-17 takes off from Florida on its way to active service in England, embarking on a flight via Puerto Rico, Dakar and Marrakesh. Joining the American crew are two British hitchhikers, who need a lift home. One of them, an attractive WAAF, seems to be a good omen – she looks like the painted figure on their fuselage. But each leg of the journey is beset with increasing difficulty and danger. Is someone on board not what they seem to be?	BBC Radio 4 Afternoon Play
2009-06-11	Taken (Note: Producer: Fiona McAlpine, Director: Carl Prekopp)	Suzanne Heathcote	Will Keen, Brigit Forsyth, Joseph Kloska, Wendy Nottingham, Jasmine Hyde, Alex Woodhall, Crispin Clover, Leighton Martin, Nicola Fox and Amelia Rubra	The disappearance of a little girl in Simon's town brings home the fact that, since his divorce, his own daughter has no idea who he is. Fuelled by alcohol and nightmares, Simon's obsession with finding the missing girl and his failure to be a good father pushes him to the edge.	BBC Radio 4 Afternoon Play
2013-03-30	Jill (Note: Producer: Fiona McAlpine, Adapted by: Robin Brooks)	Philip Larkin, Robin Brooks	Samuel Barnett, Jessica Raine, Richard Goulding, Frank Dillane, and Grace Englert	John Kemp, a Northern Grammar boy arrives at Oxford for his first term. Socially awkward and inexperienced, he finds he is sharing rooms with the upper class Christopher Warner, whose brash loutish behaviour both intimidates and attracts him. Jill is a subtle and moving account of a young man facing the big issues of life - sex and class - and retreating into the world of the imagination.	BBC Radio 4 Classic Serial
2013-04-07	A Girl in Winter (Note: Producer: Fiona McAlpine, Adapted by: Richard Stevens)	Philip Larkin, Richard Stevens	Carolyn Genzkow, Jolyon Coy, and Sinead Matthews	In wintery wartime Britain, Katherine Lind, exiled and alone, endures her job as an assistant in an obscure provincial library with an unpleasant boss and unfriendly colleagues. Frozen in time and tragedy, her past is gone - and with it her family, her friends, her old life. She is living moment by moment. But on this cold, bleak Saturday, news from an English family she once knew forces her to relive the idyllic summer she spent with them six years before.	BBC Radio 4 Classic Serial
