= Rumpole of the Bailey (radio series) =

British Radio Series by John Mortimer

Rumpole of the Bailey is a radio series created and written by the British writer and barrister John Mortimer based on the television series Rumpole of the Bailey. Five different actors portrayed Horace Rumpole in these episodes: Leo McKern, Maurice Denham, Timothy West, Benedict Cumberbatch, and Julian Rhind-Tutt.

== Casts ==
Since 1980 there were a number of different BBC radio productions derived from the Rumpole stories. Essentially there were two different series and three Christmas specials – yielding a grand total of 40 episodes. Some were new radio adaptations of scripts previously produced for TV; some were special radio adaptations of stories first published in book format after the end of the final TV series; and some were brand-new, purpose-written episodes created for radio.

Five different actors – including Leo McKern – portrayed as Horace Rumpole in these 40 different episodes.

1980 – One series – a total of thirteen 30 minute episodes featured Maurice Denham as Horace Rumpole.

2003 – 2012 – In this period, there were seven mini-seasons – a total of eighteen 45 minute episodes featuring Timothy West as Horace Rumpole. West's real-life wife Prunella Scales appeared as Rumpole's wife Hilda. The seven mini-seasons were produced in 2003, 2006, 2007, 2008, 2009, 2010 and 2012. In the latter two mini-seasons (2010 and 2012) there were also actors – Benedict Cumberbatch and Jasmine Hyde – portraying the "young Rumpole" and "young Hilda".

2014 – 2015 – In this period there were two mini-seasons – a total of six episodes featuring Benedict Cumberbatch and Jasmine Hyde reprising their roles as "young" Rumpole and Hilda (these episodes did not feature West and Scales as the present-day Rumpoles).

2016 – In this period there were two mini-series – a total of four episodes with Julian Rhind-Tutt taking over the role of Rumpole and Jasmine Hyde reprising her role as Hilda.

2017 – A further three-part miniseries starring Julian Rhind-Tutt and Jasmine Hyde was broadcast on BBC Radio 4 in September 2017.

There were also three one-off Christmas specials produced by BBC Radio in 1996, 1997 and 2001. Featuring respectively Timothy West, Leo McKern and Desmond Barrit as Horace Rumpole.

== Episodes ==
There have been two series of Rumpole stories adapted for radio and three stand-alone radio specials.

The first series consisted of a single season of 13 episodes. It was broadcast in 1980. It starred Maurice Denham as Horace Rumpole and Margot Boyd as Hilda Rumpole.

The second series has consisted to date of ten short "mini-seasons" – totaling 28 episodes. The series started in 2003 and was still being produced as of 2016. The first seven mini-seasons starred Timothy West as Horace Rumpole and his real-life wife Prunella Scales as Hilda. Two latter mini-seasons have starred Benedict Cumberbatch as Rumpole and Jasmine Hyde as Hilda, with Julian Rhind-Tutt replacing Cumberbatch in the latest mini-season (2016).

=== Rumpole: The Splendours and Miseries of an Old Bailey Hack (1980) ===
A single series of 13 episodes. Broadcast July–October 1980

1. "Rumpole and the Confession of Guilt" (21 July 1980)
2. "Rumpole and the Dear Departed" (28 July 1980)
3. "Rumpole and the Gentle Art of Blackmail" (4 August 1980)
4. "Rumpole and the Rotten Apple" (11 August 1980)
5. "Rumpole and the Man of God" (18 August 1980)
6. "Rumpole and the Defence of Guthrie Featherstone" (25 August 1980)
7. "Rumpole and the Show Folk" (1 September 1980)
8. "Rumpole and the Fascist Beast" (8 September 1980)
9. "Rumpole and the Case of Identity" (15 September 1980)
10. "Rumpole and the Expert Witness " (22 September 1980)
11. "Rumpole and the Course of True Love" (29 September 1980)
12. "Rumpole and the Perils of the Sea" (6 October 1980)
13. "Rumpole and the Age of Retirement" (13 October 1980)
  - Six of the thirteen episodes were brand-new, specially-written stories – created by Mortimer exclusively for the 1980 BBC Radio series. Those six stories were never adapted for television. (Episodes above: 2, 3, 4, 6, 10, 12)
  - Six of the thirteen episodes were new special radio adaptations by Mortimer of all six stories featured in TV Series Two (Episodes above: 5, 7, 8, 9, 11, 13)
  - One of the thirteen episodes was a new special radio adaptation by Mortimer of the original one-off TV play that he wrote for BBC TV's Play For Today in 1975 – that inspired the subsequent TV series. (Episode 1 above)
    - (The six specially-written new stories in the 1980 radio series were adapted into literary form by John Mortimer and published in the 1981 book "Regina V. Rumpole" – together with Mortimer's adaptation of his 1975 "Play For Today" Rumpole story – which also featured in the radio series. This book did not include the six stories in the radio series that were adapted from TV Series Two as those six stories had been published in the 1979 book "The Trials of Rumpole." The "Regina V. Rumpole" book was re-published in 1982 under the title "Rumpole for the Defence".)

=== Rumpole of the Bailey (2003–present) ===
Twelve mini-seasons (to date). Broadcast 2003–2018.

==== 2003 mini-season ====
1. "Rumpole and the Primrose Path" (24 September 2003)
2. "Rumpole and the Scales of Justice" (1 October 2003)
3. "Rumpole and the Vanishing Juror" (8 October 2003)
4. "Rumpole Redeemed" (15 October 2003)
  - The mini-season consisted of four radio plays each of 45 minutes duration. All four stories were adapted from a book published in 2002 of six brand-new Rumpole short stories by John Mortimer – titled "Rumpole and the Primrose Path"

==== 2006 mini-season ====
- "Rumpole's Return"
1. "Rumpole and the Teenage Werewolf" (19 July 2006)
2. "Rumpole and the Right to Privacy" (26 July 2006)
  - The mini-season consisted of two radio plays both of 45 minutes duration. One story ("The Right to Privacy”) was another adaptation from Mortimer’s 2002 book – "Rumpole and the Primrose Path”. The other story (“The Teenage Werewolf") was adapted from a book of seven new Rumpole short stories by Mortimer published in 2001 – “Rumpole Rests His Case"

==== 2007 mini-season ====
- "Rumpole and the Reign of Terror"
1. Truth Makes All Things Plain (15 August 2007)
2. The Past Catches up with Us All (22 August 2007)
  - The mini-season was adapted from a new Rumpole novel by John Mortimer published in 2006 – titled “Rumpole and the Reign of Terror". The adaptation was presented as a radio play in two halves – each of 45 minutes.

==== 2008 mini-season ====
- "The Antisocial Behaviour of Horace Rumpole"
1. Rumpole on Trial (28 May 2008)
2. Going for Silk (29 May 2008)
  - The mini-season was adapted from a new Rumpole novel by John Mortimer published in 2007 – titled "The Antisocial Behaviour of Horace Rumpole”. The adaptation was presented as a radio play in two halves – each of 45 minutes.

==== 2009 mini-season ====
- "Rumpole and the Penge Bungalow Murders"
1. Old Unhappy Far-Off Things (19 May 2009)
2. Alone and Without a Leader (26 May 2009)
  - The mini-season was adapted from a Rumpole novel by John Mortimer published in 2004 – titled "Rumpole and the Penge Bungalow Murders" The adaptation was presented as a radio play in two halves – each of 45 minutes.

==== 2010 mini-season ====
1. "Rumpole and the Family Pride" (9 August 2010)
2. "Rumpole and the Eternal Triangle" (10 August 2010)
  - The mini-season consisted of two new adaptations of Rumpole stories that were originally presented in 1992 in Season Seven of the “Rumpole of the Bailey” TV series. The stories were also published in short story form in the 1992 companion book of that series – titled “Rumpole on Trial"

==== 2012 mini-season ====
1. "Rumpole and the Man of God" (1 March 2012)
2. "Rumpole and the Explosive Evidence" (2 March 2012)
3. "Rumpole and the Gentle Art of Blackmail" (18 December 2012)
4. "Rumpole and the Expert Witness" (25 December 2012)
  - The mini-season consisted of four episodes. Two of the episodes ("The Gentle Art of Blackmail" and “The Expert Witness”) were new adaptations of stories that were originally written by John Mortimer especially for the BBC’s 1980 Rumpole radio series. One episode (“Man Of God”) was a new adaptation of a Rumpole story that was originally presented in 1979 in Season Two of the “Rumpole of the Bailey” TV series. The fourth episode (”The Explosive Evidence”) was a new adaptation of a classic Rumpole story.

==== 2014 mini-season ====
1. "Rumpole and the Old Boy Net" (20 March 2014)
2. "Rumpole and the Sleeping Partners" (21 March 2014)
  - The mini-season consisted of two episodes. One of the episodes ("The Old Boy Net”) was a new adaptation of a Rumpole story that was originally presented in 1983 in Season Three of the “Rumpole of the Bailey” TV series. The other episode (“The Sleeping Partners") was a new adaptation of a classic Rumpole story

==== 2015 mini-season ====
1. "Rumpole and the Portia of our Chambers" (20 March 2015)
2. "Rumpole and the Age of Miracles" (20 March 2015)
3. "Rumpole and the Bubble Reputation" (21 March 2015)
4. "Rumpole and the Tap End" (21 March 2015)
  - The mini-season consisted of four new adaptations of Rumpole stories that were originally presented in 1988 in Season Five of the “Rumpole of the Bailey” TV series. The stories were also published in short story form in the 1988 companion book of that series – titled “Rumpole and the Age of Miracles”

==== 2016 mini-season ====
1. "Rumpole On Trial" (28 March 2016)
2. "Rumpole And Hilda" (29 March 2016)
3. "Rumpole and Memories of Christmas Past" (25 December 2016)
4. "Rumpole and The New Year's Resolutions" (27 December 2016)
  - Julian Rhind-Tutt replaces Benedict Cumberbatch as young Rumpole while Jasmine Hyde returns as young Hilda.

==== 2017 mini-season ====
1. "Rumpole and the Way Through the Woods" (18 September 2017)
2. "Rumpole for the Prosecution" (19 September 2017)
3. "Rumpole and the Quacks" (20 September 2017)

==== 2018 mini-season ====
1. "Rumpole and the Golden Thread" (7 May 2018)
2. "Rumpole and the Official Secret" (8 May 2018)
3. "Rumpole and the Quality of Life" (9 May 2018)

=== Occasional Christmas Radio Specials ===
There have been three stand-alone radio episodes broadcast by BBC Radio during the Christmas season in different years

- 1996: "Rumpole and the Widow Twankey"

Featuring Timothy West as Rumpole. Produced by Pam Fraser Solomon. First broadcast: December 1996

  - This was a new adaptation of a classic Rumpole story and is a reading, not a dramatization.
- 1997: "The Spirit of Christmas"

Featuring Leo McKern as Rumpole. Abridged and directed by Bob Sinfield. Produced by Ken Phillips. First broadcast: 30 December 1997

  - This was a new adaptation of a story that was originally written by John Mortimer especially for the BBC’s 1980 Rumpole radio series.
- 2001: "Rumpole and the Old Familiar Faces"

Featuring Desmond Barrit as Rumpole. First broadcast: 25 December 2001

  - This was an adaptation of a story by John Mortimer – published in his 2002 book of short stories titled “Rumpole Rests His Case”
