= An Expert in Murder =

2008 novel by Nicola Upson

- First edition
- Author: Nicola Upson
- Language: English
- Series: Josephine Tey Series
- Genre: Crime fiction, Theatre-fiction
- Publisher: Faber and Faber
- Publication date: March 6, 2008
- Publication place: United Kingdom
- Media type: Print (Hardcover)
- Pages: 304 pp
- ISBN: 0-571-23770-3
- OCLC: 181422451
- Dewey Decimal: 823/.92 22
- LC Class: PR6121.P76 E97 2008b
- Followed by: Angel with Two Faces

An Expert in Murder is a historical crime novel by Nicola Upson, published on March 6, 2008.

== Plot ==
The novel is set in the London theatres of the 1930s. The book revolves around Josephine Tey, a fictional version of the famous novelist. The story begins with Tey taking the train from Scotland to London in order to attend the final week of performances of her renowned play, Richard of Bordeaux, written under the pseudonym Gordon Daviot. On board, she meets a young woman, Elspeth Simmons, the adopted daughter of hatmakers from Berwick-upon-Tweed. The two strike up a friendship on the journey, as the girl is a fan of Tey's work, and is on her way to see the play again.

Upon arriving in London, the pair separate, as Elspeth has left her bag on the train. Soon after, the girl is found dead, apparently having been stabbed with a hat pin, a crime which seems to have been carefully planned. Here enters Detective Inspector Archie Penrose, an old acquaintance of Tey's, the best friend of her lover, whom Penrose saw die at the Somme.

Clues suggest that Tey may have been the intended target, so the narrative follows her and her time at the theatre. There, additional deaths occur. The narrative introduces the leads in the play, Johnny and Lydia, who are based on the actors John Gielgud and Gwen Ffrangcon-Davies. The plot combines elements of theatre casting and performance with a murder mystery structure.

== Critical reception ==
There has been a mixed reception for the book. It has been lauded for its frank portrayal of homosexuality, but some reviews say it has failed to cast any light on Tey herself.

Mark Lawson wrote of the book that "the novel uses crime fiction's past to entertaining present ends. In a book teeming with literary pseudonyms and disguised identities, there are strong hints that Nicola Upson may make a name in crime fiction as the real thing".

== Radio Adaptation ==
The book was dramatised in ten parts by Robin Brooks for BBC Radio 4's Woman's Hour Drama, starring Meg Fraser. It was broadcast between April 21, 2008 and May 2, 2008, barely a month after the novel's publication.
