= Dark Road (play) =

- Official poster of the 2013 Lyceum production
- Written by: Ian Rankin; Mark Thomson
- Genre: Crime thriller
- Setting: Edinburgh

Premiere
- Date: 25 September 2013
- Place: Royal Lyceum Theatre, Edinburgh

Dark Road is a 2013 play written by Ian Rankin and Mark Thomson. It made its world premiere at the Royal Lyceum Theatre, Edinburgh in September 2013, and was expected to embark on a UK tour in 2014.

== Production history ==
Dark Road is co-written by Ian Rankin and the Royal Lyceum Theatre's Artistic Director Mark Thomson. On 30 April 2013, it was announced that the play which would mark Rankin's play-writing debut would begin previews at the Royal Lyceum Theatre, Edinburgh on 25 September 2013, with an official opening night on 1 October, booking for a limited period until 19 October. The production was also directed by Thomson with fight direction by Malcolm Shields, design by Francis O'Connor, lighting design by Malcolm Rippeth, video design by Euan McLaren and composition and sound design by Philip Pinsky. It is expected that the play will tour the UK during 2014, in a co-production between the Lyceum and the Wales Millennium Centre.

A performance runs 2hrs 45mins, including one interval of 20 mins.

== Synopsis ==
The play is set in modern-day Edinburgh and follows Scotland's first female Chief constable Isobel McArthur now Chief superintendent of Edinburgh following the creation of Police Scotland, as she considers retirement and ponders writing a book. As part of that she reviews the case of Alfred Chalmers a serial killer who killed four girls twenty five years previous, a conviction she has long held doubts about. What follows is a thriller that throws herself, her daughter and her colleagues into a psychological battle against Chalmers.

== Principal roles and original cast ==
Character	Edinburgh performer
Isobel McArthur	Maureen Beattie
Alexandra McArthur	Sara Vickers
Alfred Chalmers	Philip Whitchurch
Frank Bowman	Robert Gwilym
Fergus McLintock (Black Fergus)	Ron Donachie
Janice	Nicola Roy
Drew, Young Man, Male Nurse	Jonathan Holt
Female Nurse	Belle Jones

== Critical reception ==
The production received mostly positive reviews. Neil Cooper in The Herald wrote: "there are enough twists and turns in his Edinburgh-set yarn to keep audiences spellbound", and noted that despite the "script needing paring down slightly, Rankin and Thomson have nevertheless produced a gripping piece of tartan noir that thrills and entertains in equal measure." Liam Rudden in the Edinburgh Evening News wrote: that the production was "Vicious, twisted and visceral" and went on to note the shows length and said that the production "seldom dips in pace" and that Rankin and Thomson "had produced an unpretentious, honest evening’s entertainment that, like his crime novels, leave you desperate to discover more about his characters."

Some were more critical, with David Pollock in The Independent writing: "There’s quite a bit to recommend here, including a great cast, a stunningly ambitious rotating pedestal of sets designed by Francis O’Connor and a whodunit reveal which is typically Rankin, satisfyingly obvious and unexpected all at once" but went on to say that the play was "essentially still the work of a debut playwright" and that it was the fate of the female leads "Isobel and Alexandra which leave the sourest taste in the mouth: neither ultimately in control, both manipulated at best, or simply portrayed as being too weak and soft of will to win the games of brutish men." Mark Fisher in The Guardian wrote: "Thomson draws out a set of ferocious performances in a pacy production that papers over the more implausible corners of the plot and the clunkier passages of exposition. What's harder to transcend is the hermetic nature of the genre: when everything rests on solving the mystery, there's little room for metaphor. Rankin goes some way to dealing with this by developing a theme about living with the consequences of guilty secrets and half-remembered mistakes, but by the end, when the play lurches into Victorian melodrama, we're left with the empty feeling of a story which, however well told, lacks resonance."
