= Esther Woolfson =

British writer

Esther Woolfson is a British writer known for her books on birds, in particular corvids. She grew up in Glasgow and studied Chinese at the University of Edinburgh and Hebrew University.

== Works ==
- Between Light and Storm: How We Live With Other Species (Granta, 2020; ISBN 9781783782796)
- Corvus: A Life with Birds (Granta, 2008; ISBN 978-1-58243-477-3)
- Field Notes from a Hidden City: An Urban Nature Diary (Granta, 2013; ISBN 978-1-61902-349-9)
