= The Violet's Message =

Painting by John Everett Millais

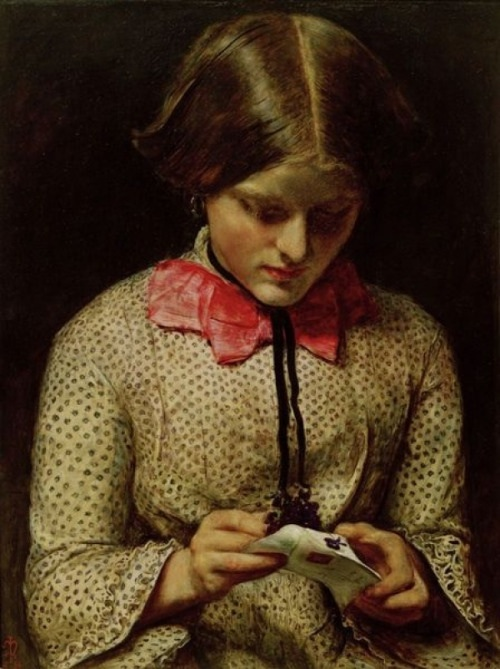
- Artist: John Everett Millais
- Year: 1854
- Type: Oil on panel
- Dimensions: 25.4 cm × 19.7 cm (10.0 in × 7.8 in)
- Location: Private collection

The Violet's Message or A Girl with Violets is an 1854 oil painting by the English artist John Everett Millais. It shows a woman in a dress with a black ribbon choker and a pink bow at her neck reading a letter in which there are violet flowers.

The painting, described as an "intimate, jewel-like picture", and art historian William Gaunt described it as "one of Millais's most enchanting works". It was one of several "cabinet pictures" (small-scale works on domestic topics for private sale) that Millais produced in 1854. The model was Annie Miller (1835–1925); in some early sources the model was misidentified as Elizabeth Eleanor Siddall (1829–1862).

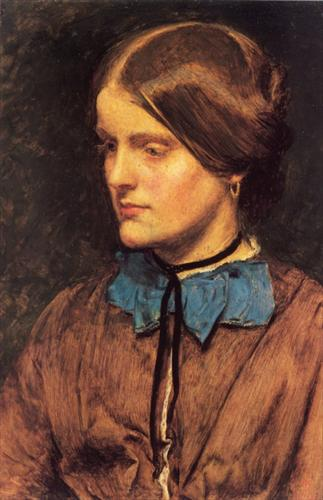
Annie Miller, painted by Millais as a pendant to The Violet's Message, both in 1854.

Millais painted Miller in two pendant (companion) portraits in 1854, both with Miller as the sitter: this portrait and Annie Miller. There are similarities in the dress in the two paintings: the black ribbon choker around the neck, and the bow around the neck (though of differing colours). It is thought that the two paintings were painted 'probably simultaneously' in April or May 1854.

The Victorians were especially keen on the language of flowers, and would have recognised that the violets convey fidelity.

Joseph Arden (1799–1879) of Rickmansworth Park, Hertfordshire, a lawyer and important early patron of Millais, owned the painting by October 1857. It was sold by Christie's as part of Arden's collection in London on 26 April 1879 (Lot 29), described as A Girl with Violets, for 60 guineas. After passing through several more owners, it was sold at auction by Christie's in its "Defining British Art Evening Sale" (Lot 17) on 30 June 2016 for £602,500 to an anonymous buyer.

== See also ==
- List of paintings by John Everett Millais
