= Gordon H. Fleming =

American writer, critic and professor (1920–1999)

The Unforgettable Season by G. H. Fleming.

Gordon H. Fleming (June 4, 1920 – May 30, 1999) was an American writer, critic and professor who specialized in the Pre-Raphaelite Brotherhood. Outside of academia he was best known for several "clippings books" he published about various baseball teams and seasons. These books used selections from newspapers of the time to create a day-by-day record of particularly interesting seasons in baseball history.

== Life ==
Fleming was born in China, moving to San Francisco at the age of four. He graduated in English Literature from Berkeley, studied law for a year, and then joined the US Navy on America's entry into World War II. After the war, he taught English in Istanbul, where he met and married his wife. He returned to Berkeley, taking an MA and PhD, and then working in several universities. He retired as professor emeritus of English at the University of New Orleans. He died of a brain tumor in Chicago, Illinois.

== Academic work ==
Fleming published several scholarly books about Victorian art and literature, such as Rossetti and the Pre-Raphaelite Brotherhood (1967), That ne'er shall meet again: Rossetti, Millais, Hunt (1971), The Young Whistler, 1834-66 (1978), Lady Colin Campbell: Victorian "sex goddess" (1989), James Abbott McNeill Whistler: A Life (1991). John Everett Millais: a Biography (1999).

== Baseball writings ==
His first clipping book, The Unforgettable Season (1981), remains his most admired. Sports Illustrated selected it as one of the top 100 sports books ever, and a new paperback edition was published in 2005 with a foreword by baseball historian Lawrence Ritter. The book recounts the melodramatic National League season of 1908, which included Fred Merkle's infamous "bonehead play" and the resulting playoff between the Chicago Cubs and the New York Giants. The book conveys the color and excitement of the pennant race through the sometimes florid newspaper stories of the time.

Fleming subsequently published two other clippings books. The Dizziest Season: The Gashouse Gang Chases the Pennant (1984) followed the sometimes zany adventures of the Gashouse Gang, the 1934 St. Louis Cardinals and their famed pair of pitchers, brothers Dizzy and Paul Dean. In 1985 Fleming published Murderers' Row, a book covering the 1927 season of the New York Yankees, a ball club generally considered one of the greatest ever.
