= Nicola Upson =

British novelist (born 1970)

Nicola Jane Upson (born 1970) is a British novelist, known for a series of crime novels featuring a fictional version of Josephine Tey as the heroine and detective.

== Biography ==
Upson was born in Suffolk, England, in 1970, has a bachelor's degree in English from Downing College, Cambridge, and lives in Cambridge.

== Work ==
Upson presents Tey as a lesbian in her novels, and has said: "I've got enough letters and interviews enough conversations with people who knew her well that make me certain that Josephine Tey was gay."

Upson has said that the theme of separation in Dear Little Corpses (2022), which involves the disappearance of UK civilian evacuees in 1939, was inspired partly by her parents' deaths during the COVID-19 pandemic in the United Kingdom.

== Personal life ==
Upson's partner is the folk singer, novelist, and radio presenter Mandy Morton.

== Novels ==
=== Josephine Tey books ===
- An Expert in Murder (2008)
- Angel with Two Faces (2009)
- Two for Sorrow (2010)
- Fear in the Sunlight (2012)
- The Death of Lucy Kyte (2013)
- London Rain (2015)
- Nine Lessons (2017)
- Sorry for the Dead (2019)
- The Dead of Winter (2020)
- Dear Little Corpses (2022)
- Shot With Crimson (2023)

=== Standalone novels ===
- Stanley and Elsie (2019)
- The Christmas Clue (2025)
