= Jonquil Panting =

British radio producer and director (born 1966)

Jonquil Panting (born 26 February 1966) is a British radio producer and director, notable for her work for BBC Radio 4, such as Witness: Five Plays from the Gospel of Luke (2007), I, Claudius (2010), Born in the DDR, and The Way We Live Now.

== Radio plays ==
A dozen radio productions (2005-2021) are listed at British Comedy Guide

Radio Plays Directed or Produced by Jonquil Panting
Date first broadcast	Play	Author	Cast	Synopsis Awards	Station Series
17 December 2007	Witness: Five Plays from the Gospel of Luke: The Lake	Nick Warburton	Tom Goodman-Hill, Peter Firth, Paul Copley, Stephen Greif, Sam Dale, John Lloyd Fillingham, Simon Treves, Laura Molyneux and Peter Marinker	Series imagining the story of Jesus through the eyes of those who witnessed it. The Lake means everything to Peter and Andrew. How could they leave it behind?	BBC Radio 4 Afternoon Play
18 December 2007	Witness: Five Plays from the Gospel of Luke: Outsiders	Nick Warburton	Tom Goodman-Hill, Peter Firth, Paul Copley, Paul Hilton, Maxine Peake, Lorraine Ashbourne, Rachel Atkins, Peter Marinker, Ben Crowe and Poppy Friar	Series imagining the story of Jesus through the eyes of those who witnessed it. Jesus' revolutionary teaching is gathering more and more followers. But the more he embraces the outcasts, the more he challenges the authorities.	BBC Radio 4 Afternoon Play
19 December 2007	Witness: Five Plays from the Gospel of Luke: Jerusalem	Nick Warburton	Tom Goodman-Hill, Peter Firth, Paul Hilton, Robin Soans, Simon Treves, Alex Lanipekun, Joannah Tincey, Sam Dale, Peter Marinker, Anna Bengo, Sam Pamphilon and Skye Bennett	Series imagining the story of Jesus through the eyes of those who witnessed it. The Galileans make the long journey south to the heart of their nation. But their triumphant arrival is fraught with danger and betrayal.	BBC Radio 4 Afternoon Play
20 December 2007	Witness: Five Plays from the Gospel of Luke: Tested	Nick Warburton	Tom Goodman-Hill, Peter Firth, Paul Hilton, Robin Soans, Colin Stinton, Penelope Wilton, Ben Crowe, Peter Marinker, Anna Bengo and Lloyd Thomas	Series imagining the story of Jesus through the eyes of those who witnessed it. The arrest of Jesus will test the faith, heart and courage of everyone who plays a part in what will follow.	BBC Radio 4 Afternoon Play
21 December 2007	Witness: Five Plays from the Gospel of Luke: Beginnings	Nick Warburton	Tom Goodman-Hill, Peter Firth, Penelope Wilton, Lorraine Ashbourne, Julian Bleach, David De Keyser, Rachel Atkins, Ben Onwukwe, Laura Molyneux and Sam Pamphilon	Series imagining the story of Jesus through the eyes of those who witnessed it. While the disciples are paralysed by Jesus' death, Mary ponders the mystery of his birth.	BBC Radio 4 Afternoon Play
16 June 2008 – 4 July 2008	The Way We Live Right Now	Anthony Trollope updated and dramatised by Jonathan Myerson	Henry Goodman, Dexter Fletcher, John Rowe, Nyasha Hatendi, David Bamber, Lucy Montgomery, Sheridan Smith, Chipo Chung, Ben Crowe, Emily Wachter, Annette Badland, Corey Johnson, Nadim Sawalha, Liz Sutherland, Stephen Critchlow, Chris Pavlo, Beth Chalmers, Dan Starkey and Joan Walker	Former British tennis star Felix 'Flex' Carbury once had a career. Now he has a problem.	BBC Radio 4 Woman's Hour Drama
28 November 2010 – 2 January 2011	I, Claudius	Robert Graves dramatised by Robin Brooks	Tom Goodman-Hill, Derek Jacobi, Harriet Walter, Tim McInnerny, Alison Pettitt, Sam Dale, Jude Akuwudike, Sean Baker, Harvey Allpress, Felix Zadek-Ewing, Harry Child, Lauren Mote, Ryan Watson, Holly Gibbs, Trevor Peacock, Joseph Kloska, Hattie Morahan, Zubin Varla, Henry Devas, Leah Brotherhead, Christine Kavanagh, Iain Batchelor, Tony Bell, Lloyd Thomas, James Warner, Samuel Barnett, Adeel Akhtar, Sally Orrock, Claire Harry, Deeivya Meir and Jessica Raine	The inside story of the lives and deaths of the Julio-Claudian dynasty, from the reign of the first Emperor Augustus to the fifth, Nero, told through the secret memoirs of their obscure relation, Claudius. Born a drooling, stammering weakling, Claudius' early reputation as an idiot keeps him safe from office and assassination, until a puzzling prophecy about him begins to come shockingly true.	BBC Radio 4 Classic Serial
20 June 2015	Born In The DDR	Rocking The Wall, by Erik Kirschbaum, dramatised by Jonathan Myerson			BBC Radio 4
