= Children in Need 2026 =

2026 telethon

- Genre: Telethon
- Presented by: Alex Jones; Mel Giedroyc; Rylan Clark; Sara Cox; Tyler West
- Narrated by: Alan Dedicoat
- Country of origin: United Kingdom
- Original language: English

Production
- Executive producers: Adam Wydrzynski; Andrew Cartmell
- Production location: dock10
- Running time: 7:00pm–10:00pm
- Production company: BBC Studios Entertainment

Original release
- Network: BBC One; BBC iPlayer
- Release: 13 November 2026

Children in Need 2026 was a three-hour-long telethon. It was produced for BBC by BBC Studios Entertainment and broadcast live from dock10 at MediaCityUK in Salford, Greater Manchester on 13 November 2026. It aired on BBC One and simulcast on BBC iPlayer. It marked the forty-seventh Children in Need event.

== Production ==
=== Background ===
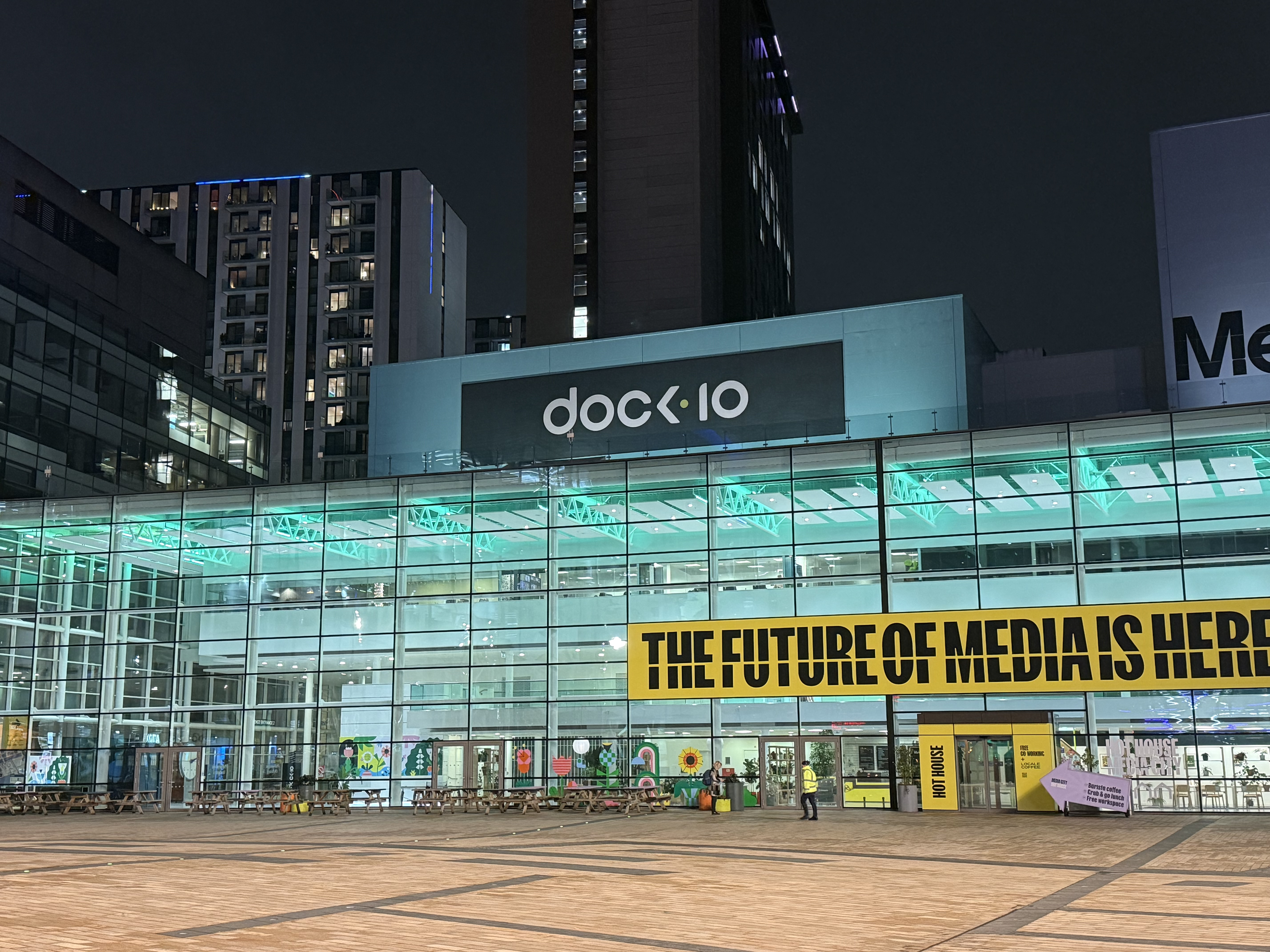
Children in Need 2026 will air live from dock10.

Children in Need launched its 2026 appeal titled "Challenge Yourself 2026" on 21 September, where the public were encouraged to create and partake in a challenge inspired by the number "26". The appeal was launched by celebrities Alex Gray, Alex Jones, Angela Scanlon, Emily Steel, Emma Bunton, JB Gill, Joe Wicks, Jordan Banjo, Mel Giedroyc, Sara Cox, Tasha Ghouri, and Tyler West with social media influencers Ash Holme, Charley Marlowe, and Jack Remmington. That same day, it was announced the telethon would broadcast live on 13 November in Salford.

On television, it will be simulcast across all four of the BBC One channels in the United Kingdom; BBC One, BBC One Northern Ireland, BBC One Scotland, and BBC One Wales., and online through the BBC iPlayer streaming service. It is set to feature comedy sketches, "surprise appearances", "special collaborations" with series that have been produced by the BBC, and the in-house Children in Need Choir performing a medley. It will feature an appearance from its mascot Pudsey Bear, who has been prominently associated with the event since his creation in 1985.

Alex Jones, Mel Giedroyc, Rylan Clark, Sara Cox, and Tyler West will collectively serve as the presenters.

On the night, 16 landmarks around the country will be illuminated yellow to mark the event. In England, these are Blackpool Tower, Brighton i360, Coventry Cathedral, Leeds Civic Hall, Lincoln Cathedral, The London Eye, Norwich Castle, Nottingham Council House, Portsmouth Spinnaker Tower, Weston-super-Mare's Grand Pier, The Melville Building and Whitley Bay's St. Mary's Lighthouse; in Northern Ireland, Titanic Belfast; in Scotland, The Falkirk Wheel and The Kelpies; and in Wales, Cardiff Bay's Millennium Centre.

== See also ==
- Children in Need
