= Matt's Million =

British children's television series

Matt's Million was a children's programme broadcast in 1996 on CITV. It was written by author Andrew Norriss who had created many children's shows such as Bernard's Watch and Woof!. It starred Peter England as Matt and Claire Parfitt as Claire. Only four episodes were produced. Windsor Davies also appeared, as did Alan Halsall, who later become famous for his role as Tyrone Dobbs in Coronation Street.

== Synopsis ==
The story was about a boy called Matt Collins, who became a millionaire at the age of 11. After developing a successful computer game, which sold heavily in the Far East, Matt receives a cheque for just over £1.25 million from his family solicitors. Upon the initial reaction of shock, Matt carefully purchases some select goods, namely two bikes and a rented Rolls-Royce, driven by his own personal chauffeur, Henry. As the series progresses, he later discovers money makes life harder than you think.
