= Slipstream (radio drama) =

- Genre: Radio drama, Science fiction
- Running time: 30 minutes
- Country of origin: United Kingdom
- Language: English
- Home station: BBC 7
- Starring: Tim McMullan, Rory Kinnear, Joannah Tincey
- Written by: Simon Bovey
- Original release: 24 March – 28 March 2008
- No. of series: 1
- No. of episodes: 5
- Audio format: Stereophonic sound

Slipstream is a radio drama by Simon Bovey, consisting of five half hour episodes that were originally broadcast on BBC 7 during March 2008.

Bovey described the premise of Slipstream in an interview as follows: "It's set in 1945 when the Allies' victory in Europe is a forgone conclusion and everyone is fighting for a piece of the spoils. And then the UFOs are sighted. Part political thriller, part war story, part future shock."

This radio drama combines a story of a raid by British commandos into Germany during the Second World War with a science fiction story about a new Nazi aircraft capable of fantastic speeds and shooting down hundreds of Allied aircraft. Nicknamed Luftschraubenstrahl (German for "Slipstream"), the silver disc-shaped aircraft turns out to be constructed around an extraterrestrial artifact.

== Plot ==
The British airforce finds themselves helpless against a mysterious new Nazi aircraft that is capable of fantastic speeds, and shoots down 150 Allied bombers during one of their bombing missions. After hearing of the bomber raid disaster, Major Barton coerces the code word "Slipstream" from a German prisoner via torture just before the prisoner dies. He persuades his leader to allow a commando raid on an experimental aircraft development site in Germany, where the Slipstream seems to have been built. The target is located between advancing American and Russian forces, who have their own agendas and may reach it before the British.

As part of his team, Barton conscripts Kate Ritchie, a British research scientist whose brother may have been lost in one of the bombing raids. To fly the Slipstream back to Britain once it has been captured, Barton recruits a German prisoner-of-war, Flugkapitän Jürgen Rahl. Jürgen is a former test pilot who was captured when his Messerschmitt Me 262 was shot down, and Barton promises to save his father in Potsdam from the advancing Russians, though he later admits he has no plans to do so.

In Germany the raiders enter an underground factory, the Mittelwerk where they find slave workers, a German "technician", Frau Schenk, and the mysterious Slipstream in a cave. In a test flight with Ritchie, Jürgen finds that piloting the aircraft is a matter of wearing a helmet and controlling it with his thoughts. Schenk tells them that previous pilots of the Slipsteam died of brain inflammation after a few missions.

Determined to secure the Slipstream for Britain, Barton and his men ambush and destroy an American squad who come to the factory. Kate and Jürgen learn what they can about the Slipstream, which seems to be built around an alien artifact that crashed into the Brazilian jungle in 1929, and was taken by the German SS after a German priest working in the Vatican learned of its existence from a missionary. The artifact is intelligent and Jürgen learns to communicate with it, and discovers that it geared to teach science rather than destroy life, and that previous pilots died when they forced it to act against its programming by taking part in war.

As the Americans and Russians close in, Jürgen pilots the Slipstream back to Britain with Kate and Barton aboard, but once the war is over, politics take over and the Slipstream has to be handed over to the Americans. The British are unsuccessful in studying it because it will not fly for any of their pilots, and bring Jürgen back for one final attempt before the craft is handed over. He takes off into outer space, apparently to return the artifact to its creators.

== Cast ==
- Major Bill Barton - Tim McMullan
- Flugkapitän Jürgen Rahl - Rory Kinnear
- Dr. Kate Ritchie - Joannah Tincey
- Lt. Dundas - Ben Crowe
- Teazle - Sam Pamphilon
- Frau Schenk - Rachel Atkins
- Voice of Slipstream - Laura Molyneaux
- Brigadier Erskine - Peter Marinker
