= SLG =

The initials SLG or S.L.G. may refer to:

- Scary Little Girls, a theatrical collective
- Sigma Lambda Gamma (ΣΛΓ), a sorority
- Simulated life game, a type of video game
- Sindicato Labrego Galego-Comisións Labregas, a Galician peasants union
- SL Green Realty Corp (NYSE symbol:SLG)
- Slave Labor Graphics, a comic book publisher
- SLG, post-nominal letters representing the Community of the Sisters of the Love of God
- Slugging percentage, a baseball statistic
- Socialist Labour Group, a former UK political party
