= Tommies =

Tommies may refer to:

- Sir Thomas Rich's School, a school located in Longlevens, Gloucester.
- Tommy Atkins, slang for a common soldier in the First World War
- Crocus tommasinianus, a flowering plant
- Thomson's gazelle, a species of antelope
- Tommies (radio drama), a BBC radio drama.
- The Thompson Community Singers, a gospel choir started by Milton Brunson
- The St. Thomas Tommies (Minnesota), the athletic teams of the University of St. Thomas
