= Vanishing Act =

Vanishing Act(s) may refer to:

== Film ==
- The Vanishing Act, an unreleased Indian English-language documentary film
- Vanishing Act, a 1986 television film featuring Mike Farrell

== Literature ==
- Vanishing Act, a Sports Beat novel by John Feinstein
- Vanishing Act, a 1995 Jane Whitefield novel by Thomas Perry
- Vanishing Acts, a 2005 novel by Jodi Picoult

== Television ==
- Vanishing Act, the UK title of the Australian miniseries Underbelly: Vanishing Act

=== Episodes of TV shows ===
- "Vanishing Act" (Bernard's Watch)
- "Vanishing Act" (Blue Heelers)
- "Vanishing Act" (Diagnosis: Murder)
- "Vanishing Act" (ER)
- "Vanishing Act" (Law & Order: Criminal Intent)
- "Vanishing Act" (Nash Bridges)
- "Vanishing Act" (The Outer Limits)
- "Vanishing Act" (Power Rangers: Turbo)
- "Vanishing Act" (Xena: Warrior Princess)
- "Vanishing Act" an episode of Creepy Crawlers

== See also ==
- Magic (illusion)
