= Witness: Five Plays from the Gospel of Luke =

British radio plays (2007)

- Genre: Radio play Christian radio
- Running time: 45 minutes
- Country of origin: United Kingdom
- Language: English
- Home station: BBC Radio 4
- Starring: Tom Goodman-Hill; Peter Firth; Paul Copley; Paul Hilton; Penelope Wilton; Robin Soans; Lorraine Ashbourne; Rachel Atkins
- Written by: Nick Warburton
- Directed by: Jonquil Panting
- Original release: 17 December – 21 December 2007

Witness: Five Plays from the Gospel of Luke was a series of five 45-minute radio plays by Nick Warburton based on the Gospel of Luke, first broadcast from 17 to 21 December 2007 (i.e. in the week before Christmas Day) as part of BBC Radio 4's Afternoon Play strand. They were directed by Jonquil Panting. Jesus and the disciples were portrayed in regional accents, a trope in radio retellings of the Gospel stories since Dorothy L. Sayers' The Man Born to Be King. Upper class characters were presented in Received Pronunciation, city-folk in Jerusalem in London working-class accents, and Romans such as Pilate and the Centurion in an American accent.

Each play was followed by a 15-minute documentary presented by Ernie Rea on the themes covered in the preceding play.

Episode 4 won the Sandford St Martin Trust Radio Premier award in 2009.

== Episodes ==
1. The Lake - The calling of Peter and Andrew
2. Outsiders - Mary Magdalene, Joanna, Simon and other outsiders are embraced by Jesus
3. Jerusalem - Jesus and his disciples arrive in Jerusalem, and Judas decides to betray him
4. Tested - The Passion, as seen by Pontius Pilate, Caiaphas, Peter, and the Virgin Mary
5. Beginners - Mary recalls her son's birth in the days after the Crucifixion, and then the disciples witness the Resurrection

== Cast ==
- Jesus - Tom Goodman-Hill
- Peter - Peter Firth
- Andrew - Paul Copley
- Judas - Paul Hilton (2-4)
- Mary - Penelope Wilton (4&5)
- Caiaphas - Robin Soans (3&4)
- Magdalene - Lorraine Ashbourne (2&5)
- Joanna - Rachel Atkins (2&5)

=== Episode 1 ===
- Baptist - Stephen Greif
- Elder - Sam Dale
- Possessed man - John Lloyd Fillingham
- John - Simon Treves
- Woman - Laura Molyneux
- Tempter - Peter Marinker

=== Episode 2 ===
- Woman - Maxine Peake
- Simon - Peter Marinker
- Friend of the sick man - Ben Crowe
- Child - Poppy Friar

=== Episode 3 ===
- Rich man - Simon Treves
- Pharisee - Alex Lanipekun
- Martha - Joannah Tincey
- Zacchaeus - Sam Dale
- Tempter - Peter Marinker
- Woman - Anna Bengo
- Lawyer - Sam Pamphilon
- Child - Skye Bennett

=== Episode 4 ===
- Baker - Ben Crowe
- Centurion - Peter Marinker
- Girl - Anna Bengo
- Guard - Lloyd Thomas
- Pilate - Colin Stinton

=== Episode 5 ===
- Angel - Julian Bleach
- Simeon - David de Keyser
- Joseph of Arimathea - Ben Onwukwe
- Young Mary - Laura Molyneux
- Cleopas - Sam Pamphilon
