= I, Claudius (radio adaptation) =

- Cover of the audiobook
- Genre: radio drama
- Running time: 6 x 60 minutes
- Country of origin: United Kingdom
- Language: English
- Home station: BBC Radio 4
- Starring: Tom Goodman-Hill, Derek Jacobi, Harriet Walter, Tim McInnerny, Samuel Barnett
- Written by: Robin Brooks, after the novels by Robert Graves
- Directed by: Jonquil Panting
- Original release: 28 November 2010 – 2 January 2011
- No. of series: 1
- No. of episodes: 6
- Opening theme: David Pickvance
- Ending theme: David Pickvance

I, Claudius is a six-part 2010 radio adaptation of Robert Graves' 1934 novel I, Claudius and its 1935 sequel Claudius the God. Broadcast as part of the Classic Serial strand on BBC Radio 4, it was adapted by Robin Brooks and directed by Jonquil Panting, with music composed by David Pickvance. Claudius was played by Tom Goodman-Hill and the series' cast is also notable for including Derek Jacobi, who played Claudius in the 1976 BBC TV adaptation of the same works, now in the role of Augustus. The series was released as a BBC Audiobook on 6 January 2011. It won the 2012 Audie Award in the "Audio Dramatization" category.

== Cast ==
- Tom Goodman-Hill as Claudius
- Derek Jacobi as Augustus
- Harriet Walter as Livia
- Tim McInnerny as Tiberius
- Alison Pettitt as Julia
- Sam Dale as Athenodorus/Sejanus/Tacitus
- Sean Baker as Thrasyllus/Pomponius/Cremutius/Asiaticus
- Christine Kavanagh as Antonia
- Samuel Barnett as Caligula
- Henry Devas as Postumus/Callistus
- Trevor Peacock as Pollio
- Hattie Morahan as Agrippina the Elder
- Zubin Varla as Herod Agrippa
- Jude Akuwudike as Cato/Cassius Chaerea/Plautius/Burrhus
- Tony Bell as Macro/Frontinus
- Sally Orrock as Calpurnia
- Claire Harry as Agrippinilla (Agrippina the Younger)
- Harvey Allpress as Young Claudius
- Jessica Raine as Messalina
- Robin Soans as Narcissus
- Ryan Watson as Britannicus
- Adeel Akhtar as Euodus
- Iain Batchelor as Soldier

== Episodes ==
1. Augustus (broadcast 28 November 2010)
2. Tiberius (broadcast 5 December 2010)
3. Sejanus (broadcast 12 December 2010)
4. Caligula (broadcast 19 December 2010)
5. Claudius (broadcast 26 December 2010)
6. Messalina (broadcast 2 January 2011)
