= Tommies (radio drama) =

- Ident card used for the first episode of Tommies.
- Genre: Drama
- Running time: 45 minutes
- Country of origin: United Kingdom
- Language: English
- Home station: BBC Radio 4
- Syndicates: BBC Radio 4 Extra
- Starring: Lee Ross; Pippa Nixon
- Created by: Jonathan Ruffle
- Written by: Jonathan Ruffle; Michael Chaplin; Nick Warburton; Avin Shah; Nandita Ghose
- Directed by: David Hunter; Jonquil Panting
- Produced by: David Hunter; Jonquil Panting; Jonathan Ruffle
- Narrated by: Indira Varma
- Original release: 7 October 2014 – 12 October 2018
- No. of series: 5 (as of November 2018)
- No. of episodes: 47 (as of November 2018)
- Audio format: Stereo
- Opening theme: composed by Nina Perry
- Website: Official website

Tommies is a British radio drama series, broadcast on BBC Radio 4. It was part of the BBC's World War I centenary season and was broadcast over four years, the same length of time as the war itself. Based on actual unit war diaries, it tells the story of a one day in the conflict exactly 100 years ago to the day of an episode's release.

Most of the episodes are set in either Flanders (the trench lines of the Western Front) or the Balkans (Salonika front), while a few narrate events in Africa or the Near East. The two principal characters are Mickey Bliss, a professional signals (wireless and telephone) NCO of the Indian army, whose initiative leads to his becoming an intelligence officer, and Celestine de Tullio, an English doctor who volunteers as a medical officer with the Serbian army in the Balkans, partly to avoid both her estranged family and Mickey Bliss.

The three of the radio plays are series creator and writer Jonathan Ruffle and directors David Hunter and Jonquil Panting. Other writers include Ruffle, Michael Chaplin, Nick Warburton, Avin Shah and Nandita Ghose.

== Cast and characters ==
- Lee Ross - Sergeant Mickey Bliss, of the Signals Section, Lahore Division, British Indian Army
- Danny Rahim - Ahmadullah Khan, a Havildar in the Signals Section, Lahore Division, British Indian Army.
- Rudi Dharmalingam - Pavan Jodha, a Jemadar in the Signals Section, Lahore Division, British Indian Army.
- Pippa Nixon - Celestine de Tullio, a doctor.
- Patrick Kennedy - Robert de Tullio, banker and husband of Celestine.
- Alex Wyndham - Lieutenant Maberley Dunster, of B Squadron, 15th King's Hussars, British Army.
- Tony Pitts - Sergeant Walter Oddy, of the Signals Section, 2nd Division, British Expeditionary Force.
- Elaine Claxton - Sister Marjorie Blaikeley, based in a Boulogne military hospital.
- Clive Hayward - Major Hector Monkhouse, of the 15th Bengal Lancers, British Indian Army.
- Sam Valentine - Harry de Tullio, young Pilot with the British army.

== Cultural references ==
"Mickey Bliss" is Cockney rhyming slang.
