= City Academy =

City Academy may refer to:

- Academy (English school), a type of school
- City Academy, London, a performing arts school
- The City Academy Bristol, England
- City Academy Norwich, England
- City Academy High School, in St. Paul, Minnesota
- Manchester City F.C. Academy,

Football academy associated with Manchester City F.C.
