= Ash Holme =

English media personality (born 1996)

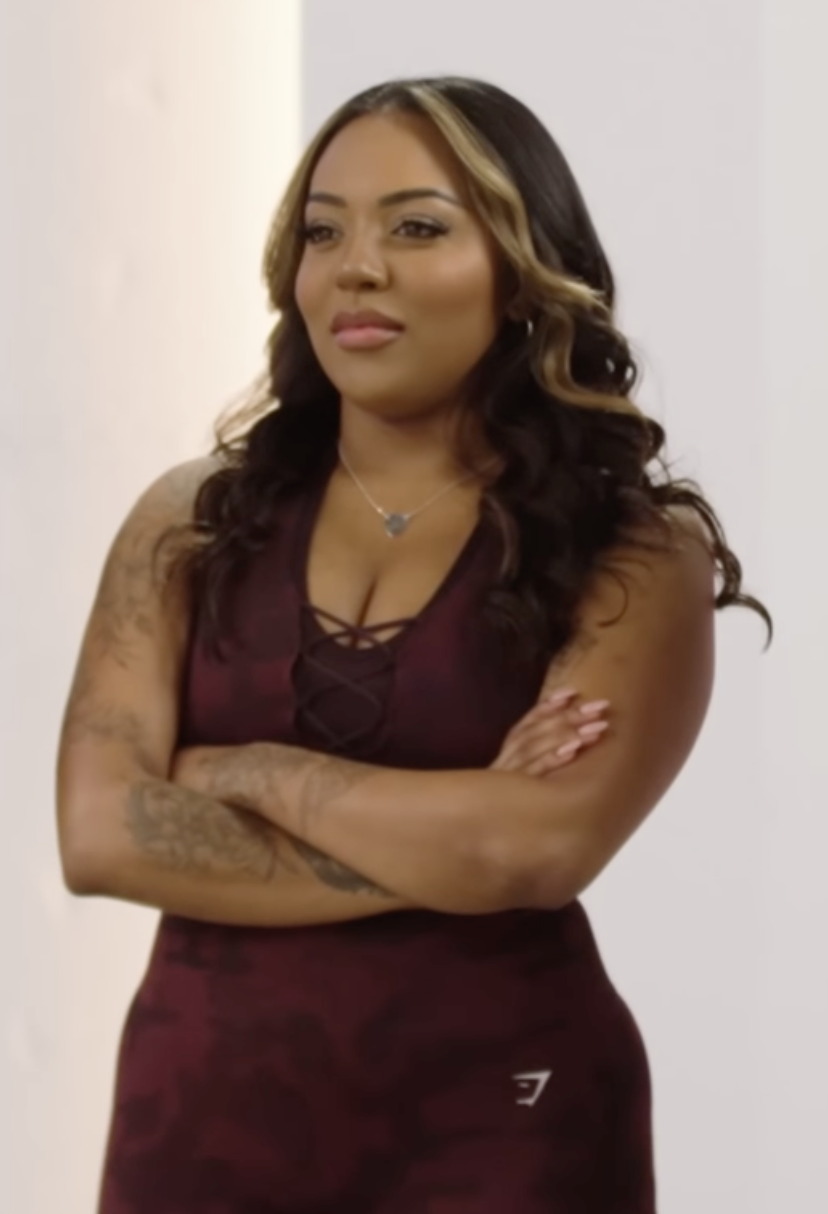
- Holme in 2025
- Born: Ashwini Sofie Holme; 5 January 1996 (age 30); Watford, Hertfordshire, England
- Education: City Academy
- Occupations: Influencer; presenter
- Years active: 2017–present

Ashwini Sofie Holme (born 5 January 1996) is an English social media influencer and presenter. After appearing as a contestant on the fourteenth series of The X Factor in 2017, she has gone on to amass an online following through social media. She has gone on to host various series, including fronting her own podcast, presenting an ITV1 series alongside her father and as a panellist on Love Island: Aftersun.

== Life and career ==
Ashwini Sofie Holme was born in Watford, Hertfordshire, on 5 January 1996. She is of Caribbean, Irish, Malaysian and Indian descent. As well as studying drama for her A-levels, Holme went on to train at City Academy, London. In 2017, she auditioned for the fourteenth series of The X Factor. She was part of the girl group NQ, who were eliminated during the six-chair challenge. However, Holme was invited back by judge Simon Cowell and was asked if she would like to join another group, New Girl Band. Holme accepted and left NQ to join them, but the group were eliminated during judges' houses.

Holme made a TikTok account in 2020, which began to amass followers after numerous viral videos. She began to collaborate with brands including Spotify, L'Oréal and Prime Video, before launching a podcast with the Fellas Studios, Antics with Ash, in 2023. As well as this, she hosted the Bumble podcast Bumble: My Love Is... and appeared in an episode of Channel 4's Get in the Van. Later that year, Holme competed in the fourth series of the Footasylum YouTube series Locked In. Also in 2023, alongside close friend Jack Remmington, who she had met on The X Factor, she co-presented For You Page on BBC Radio 1 on Christmas. In 2024, Holme fronted an ITV1 series alongside her autistic father, Phil. The series, Ash Holme: What Not to Do with Dad, followed her and her father exploring taboo topics including OnlyFans creators, foot fetishes and Japanese bondage.

Since 2024, she has starred in The Jack and Ash Show, a YouTube series and podcast, alongside Remmington. In 2025, Holme was made a rotating panellist on ITV2's Love Island: Aftersun. In early 2025, Holme co-hosted the red carpet digital content for the British Academy Film Awards, alongside Remmington. They returned as presenters for BBC Radio 1, in the early morning breakfast slot, in October 2025. October 2025 also saw the pair become faces for an eBay campaign. That same month, Holme was a panellist on ITV2's Big Brother: Late & Live.

== Filmography ==
=== Television ===
Year	Title	Role	Notes
2017	The X Factor	Contestant	Series 14
2023	Locked In	Contestant	Series 4
2023	Get in the Van	Herself	Guest appearance
2024	Ash Holme: What Not to Do with Dad	Presenter	Main role
2024–present	The Jack and Ash Show	Herself	Main role
2025	Love Island: Aftersun	Panellist	Main cast
2025	Big Brother: Late & Live	Panellist	Guest appearance

=== Audio ===
Year	Title	Role	Ref.
2023–2024	Antics with Ash	Presenter	
2023	Bumble: My Love Is...	Presenter	
2023	For You Page	Co-presenter	
2025	Early Breakfast	Co-presenter	
