= Kate Smurthwaite =

British comedian

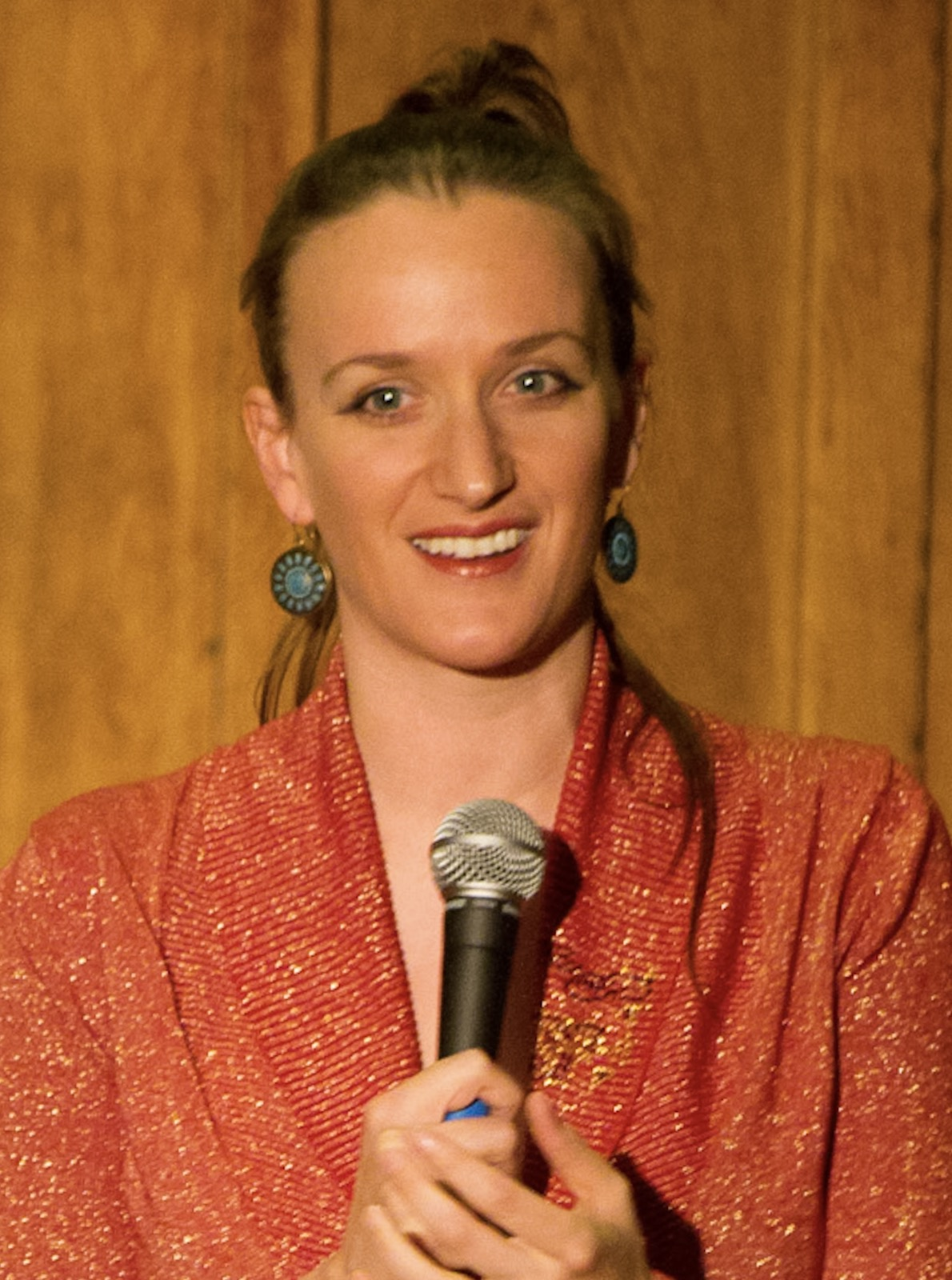
- Smurthwaite in 2010

Comedy career
- Years active: 2004–present
- Medium: Stand-up, television, radio
- Genres: Satire, political satire, news satire, observational comedy
- Website: www.katesmurthwaite.co.uk

Kate Smurthwaite is a British comedian and political activist. She has appeared on British television and radio as a pundit, offering opinion and comment on subjects ranging from politics to religion.

She performs stand-up around the UK and overseas including an annual comedy show at the Edinburgh Fringe and is a patron of Humanists UK, formerly known as the British Humanist Association, and vice chair of Abortion Rights UK.

== Early life ==
Smurthwaite studied mathematics at Lincoln College, Oxford, from 1994 to 1997. After leaving university, she worked in London and Japan as an investment banker, specifically within convertible bond research for UBS Warburg.

== Comedy ==
Smurthwaite began performing comedy in early 2004. In 2008, she was a finalist in the Hackney Empire New Act of the Year competition.

Smurthwaite has toured internationally, appearing in Stockholm, Sweden, and Tampere, Finland, and has appeared several times at the Malmö Comedy Festival in Sweden.

In 2011, Smurthwaite toured as support for Shazia Mirza and also returned to the town she grew up in and opened the Bury St Edmunds Fringe festival. She performs at many charitable benefit shows such as the No More Page Three show at the Harold Pinter Theatre, and appears at regular benefits for Sex Appeal at the Bloomsbury Theatre and for Eaves Housing at Soho Theatre and Bloomsbury Theatre. She also regularly performs at the Humanists UK annual convention.

Smurthwaite also teaches stand-up comedy through the City Academy in London.

== Television and radio appearances ==
Smurthwaite was a morning show presenter on Radio Jackie in 2006, and co-presented a show on Leith FM during the 2011 Edinburgh Fringe. She appears regularly with Jason Mohammad on BBC Radio Wales's lunchtime phone-in show and as part of BBC London's Lady Lounge with Kath Melandri. In May 2012, Smurthwaite recorded a 15-minute programme for the BBC Radio 4 series Four Thought about sexism in comedy.

On 25 October 2013, Smurthwaite took part in the 100 Women event hosted by the BBC. The day featured debate and discussion on radio, television and online, in which the participants were asked to give their opinion on the position of women in the 21st century. And in the end of the year, she was recognized as one of the BBC's 100 women.

Smurthwaite was a credited writer on the second series of The Revolution Will Be Televised, which was first broadcast on BBC Three on 10 November 2013.

Smurthwaite appeared as a panellist on Question Time on 30 January 2014, which was broadcast from St. Andrew's Hall in Norwich. The other panellists on the show were Ken Clarke, Emily Thornberry, Matthew Oakeshott, and Mark Littlewood.

On 26 October 2014, she was included again in the BBC's 100 women.

She also appeared on an episode of the Couples edition of Come Dine with Me in 2016 with her partner James.

== Edinburgh Festival Fringe shows ==
Since 2005, Smurthwaite has performed comedy shows annually at the Edinburgh Festival Fringe

- 2005 hosted Amused Moose Hot Starlets
- 2006 solo show Adrenaline at Roman Eagle Lodge
- 2007 musical show Sing-Along-A-The-Joy-Of-Sex at Mercat Bar, group show Comedy Cocktail with Lenny Peters and David Mulholland
- 2008 solo show Apes Like Me at C-Soco Urban Garden, host of political panel show Comedy Manifesto at Beehive Inn
- 2009 solo show The News at Kate at Voodoo Rooms, host of Comedy Manifesto political panel show at Beehive Inn, host of Midnight Hour variety bill show at Canons' Gait
- 2010 solo show The News at Kate 2010 at Voodoo Rooms, host of Comedy Manifesto political panel show at Beehive Inn, host of Midnight Hour variety bill show at Canons' Gait
- 2011 solo show The News at Kate 2011 at Ciao Roma, host of Comedy Manifesto political panel show at Voodoo Rooms, host of Midnight Hour variety bill show at Canons' Gait
- 2012 solo show The News at Kate 2012 at Ciao Roma, host of Comedy Manifesto political panel show at Ciao Roma, host of Midnight Hour variety bill show at Canons' Gait
- 2013 solo show The News at Kate 2013: My Professional Opinion at Ciao Roma, host of The News at Kate 2013: World Inaction a political comedy chat show at Canon's Gait. Guests included Richard Wiseman, Rebecca Mordan, Peter Buckley Hill, and Danny Vermont
- 2014 solo show The News at Kate 2014: Leftie Cock Womble at Viva Mexico, solo show The Evolution Will Be Televised at Ciao Roma, host of Late With Kate late night variable bill show at Canon's Gait.
- 2015 solo show The Wrong Sort of Feminist at the Edinburgh Fringe 2015 and the Liverpool Comedy Festival.
- 2025 solo show Severe Lacerations to the Head at the Edinburgh Fringe 2025

In 2013, Smurthwaite was awarded a ThreeWeeks Editors' Award for her News at Kate shows, citing them as a "Fringe Institution". In 2014, her science show The Evolution Will be Televised was nominated for a Creative Carbon Scotland Fringe Sustainable Practice Award. Other Edinburgh Fringe shows Smurthwaite has appeared in include Spank!, which she has hosted as well as being a guest performer, Political Animal, Nicholas Parsons' Happy Hour, and SetList.

== Activism and journalism ==
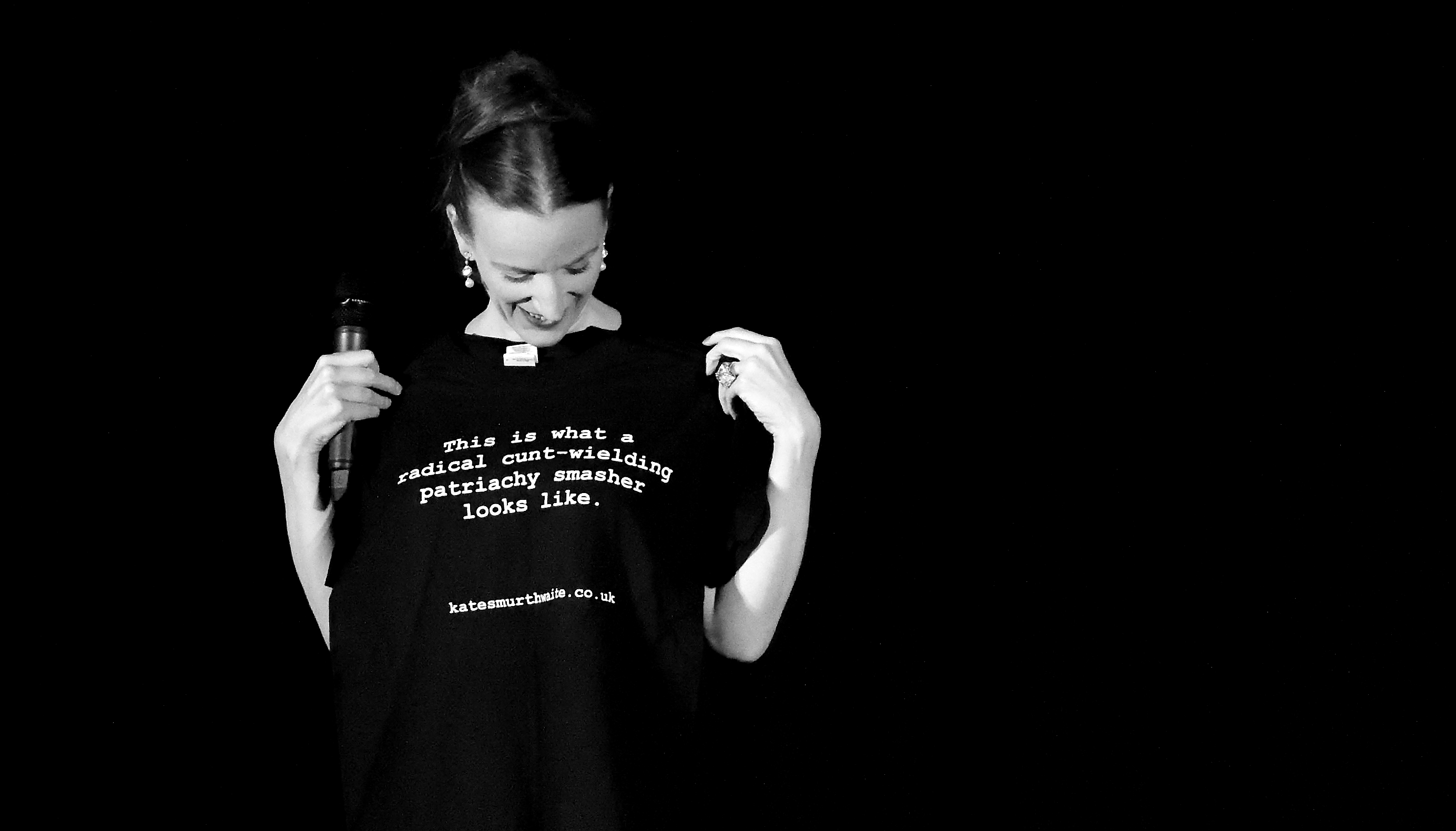
Faced with criticism of the term "feminist", Smurthwaite presented an alternative (QED 2015).

Smurthwaite is the vice-chair and media spokesperson for British NGO Abortion Rights UK, and a member of London Feminist Network and the National Secular Society. She is also on the board of the Edinburgh Fringe Society. She is also patron of Humanists UK, formerly known as the British Humanist Association. In October 2009, Smurthwaite took a place on Trafalgar Square's fourth plinth as part of Antony Gormley's One & Other project, impersonating with permission the Irish pro-choice campaigner Goretti Horgan who was unable to attend. She used the platform to highlight the disparity between abortion access in England, Scotland and Wales and Northern Ireland.

In July 2010, Smurthwaite protested at the lavish funeral of writer Sebastian Horsley with a sign reading "Where are the horse-drawn carriages for the VICTIMS of prostitution?", attracting both praise and criticism. Smurthwaite has spoken at numerous rallies including the Rally for Free Expression, the rally against Tory MP Nadine Dorries abstinence only sex education bill and the abortion rights rally in London following the death of Savita Halappanavar.

Smurthwaite performed at the five-year anniversary party for the Council of Ex-Muslims of Britain, and has hosted and spoken at a number of conferences including Feminism in London in 2008, 2009 and 2010 and Intersect in Bristol in 2012. Recently she has given talks about sex and about the intersection between atheism and feminism for student groups and branches of Sceptics in the Pub. In June 2014 she was a guest speaker at the 50th anniversary of the Birmingham Humanists.

In 2014, Smurthwaite was interviewed by the No More Page 3 campaign describing herself as a "passionate atheist", and not prudish in any way. She went on to talk about her battle with anorexia in her teens, "a part of me, almost consciously, made that decision that said, "I don't want to look like an adult woman because of the way that adult women are treated, as sex objects, I'm just going to starve myself, and if I don't ever grow boobs then nobody will ever be able to treat me like that and if I just stay looking like a young girl, by being stick thin, I'll be protected from that.", and I remember thinking that very consciously... A few years later I was down to under seven stone, and I'm quite tall and I was very ill, I didn't have periods for about 18 months, yeah I was very, very sick."

On 2 February 2015, Smurthwaite's show Leftie Cock Womble at Goldsmiths College was cancelled. The college's Feminist Society, who co-organised the appearance, complained about her views on decriminalising prostitution. Ultimately, the show was pulled because of a lack of ticket sales.

Smurthwaite has written for The Guardian, Cosmopolitan, The Independent, Stylist, The Scotsman, The Huffington Post, New Internationalist, The F-Word, Liberal conspiracy, Progressive Women, Big Smoke and London Is Funny. She also has a regular column in the National Union of Teachers' official magazine, The Teacher, as well as making regular posts to her own blog, Cruella blog. Her writing for The Independent has included articles about her grassroots work teaching English to female asylum seekers with the group Women Asylum Seekers Together, supported by Women for Refugee Women.

== Awards ==
- Hackney Empire New Act of the Year finalist 2009
- Platform 51 award April 2011
- ThreeWeeks Editors' Award 2013
