= Chance in a Million =

British TV sitcom (1984–1986)

- UK DVD Sleeve Chance in a Million
- Written by: Andrew Norriss, Richard Fegen
- Starring: Simon Callow; Brenda Blethyn
- Country of origin: United Kingdom
- Original language: English
- No. of series: 3
- No. of episodes: 18

Production
- Producer: Michael Mills
- Running time: 30 minutes
- Production company: Thames Television

Original release
- Network: Channel 4
- Release: 10 September 1984 – 1 December 1986

Chance in a Million is a British sitcom broadcast between 10 September 1984 and 1 December 1986, produced by Thames Television for the fledgling Channel 4 as part of its early homegrown programming. The series was co-written by Andrew Norriss and Richard Fegen and starred Simon Callow and Brenda Blethyn. The producer and director of the series was Michael Mills.

== Plot ==
The premise of the show is the growing relationship between Tom Chance and Alison Little, which progresses throughout the series from initial meeting through to marriage. The show is structured like a traditional sitcom, although at the time of broadcast was considered by viewers and critics to be more in line with alternative comedy in the UK.

The titular character, Tom Chance, is frequently the victim of unlikely coincidences, nearly always to his detriment (with his last name indicating Nominative Determinism). Tom is aware of the coincidences that dog him, and describes it as a "disability". However, he is generally stoical, and often declares the best course of action when they occur is to "go with the flow".

Tom meets his girlfriend, Alison Little, by chance when the two go to the same hotel. Tom is on a blind date to meet a girl, who is also called Alison. Meanwhile, Alison Little has arranged to meet her cousin Tom for the first time since they were young children.

Alison appears meek and passive, working as an archetypical librarian, although her even meeker parents consider her to be a tearaway.

Tom is shy towards Alison and oblivious to her romantic and sexual approaches, which are mostly implied and discreet. However, Alison has fallen in love with Tom at first sight and she is keen for their friendship to develop into something more intimate as the show progresses. Crucially, as Tom soon comes to realise, Alison is immune from suffering too badly from the consequences of his coincidences, although is always involved as each situation plays out.

Alison is in her twenties, while Tom is probably in his early 30s. When the show started filming, Blethyn was 38 and Callow was 35.

Tom's character is somewhat bombastic and old-fashioned, a deliberate callback to similar middle/upper-class characters in UK fiction of the Victorian/Edwardian periods. His style of speaking is a key component of his comic nature. He speaks only in short staccato sentences similar to a telegram, devoid of personal pronouns and conjunctions: "Can’t talk Alison. Car being towed. Problem with lawn furniture." However, in other ways his character is surprisingly modern: He has an amusing ability to drink an entire pint of lager in one gulp whilst in the middle of speaking a sentence, for example. (According to Callow in a DVD commentary, a trick glass containing a fraction of a pint was actually used.)

Because of Tom's tendency to get into trouble as a result of unlikely coincidences, his back story features him being arrested for crimes he did not commit – which happens so often that police Sergeant Gough gives orders for Tom not to be arrested, no matter how suspicious the circumstances.

Unlike Alison, Tom does not work. Instead, he is of independent means, his income provided by six Premium Bonds that frequently win, which he ascribes to the same coincidences that otherwise plague him.

Tom's interest is cricket, and he has a fascination with Surrey and England cricketer Alec Bedser, and a cricket bat, which has been autographed by the cricketer, is one of Tom's most treasured possessions. (Or at least was, before it was chewed up by next door's alsatian.) And in the penultimate episode, Alison presents her husband-to-be with a book containing a signed dedication by Bedser, to Tom's great delight.

The show frequently and somewhat gratuitously features women in nothing but their underwear (including Blethyn, who at various times appears in underwear, a negligee, and a basque). As such, it's reminiscent of the concurrent Benny Hill TV shows, or even the Carry On series.

== Theme ==
The title tune for the show is a version of Taking a Chance on Love.

== Cast ==
- Simon Callow as Tom Chance
- Brenda Blethyn as Alison Little
- Ronnie Stevens (series 1), Hugh Walters (series 2 and 3) as Mr. Little
- Deddie Davies as Mrs. Little
- Bill Pertwee as Sergeant Gough
- Angus MacKay as Terrence Wingent
- Geraldine Gardner aka Trudi Van Doorn as Barbara Wingent – (series 2 & 3)
- Peter Corey as Cousin Thomas
- Rosemary Smith as "Janet" – (series 3)

== Episodes ==
=== Series overview ===
| Series | Episodes | Originally released | |
| Series | Episodes | First released | Last released |
|---|---|---|---|
| 1 | 6 | 10 September 1984 | 15 October 1984 |
| 2 | 6 | 6 January 1986 | 10 February 1986 |
| 3 | 6 | 27 October 1986 | 1 December 1986 |

=== Series 1 (1984) ===
| No. overall | No. in series | Title | Original release date |
|---|---|---|---|
| 1 | 1 | "Plumstones" | 10 September 1984 |
One afternoon, a shy librarian Alison Little arrives a hotel to meet her long lost cousin Tom. Shortly after, Tom Chance turns up who happens to be on blind date with a woman also named Alison. Due to a misunderstanding Tom and Alison mistake each other for their respective guests. On the way back Tom gets himself arrested for helping a woman get her keys out of a car, he explains to Alison that he often gets arrested when caught for things he hasn’t done. Later at a restaurant, they get involved in a food fight with a disgruntled waiter and have difficulty trying to access Tom’s house when he mislays his key in the coat he left back at the restaurant. (A version of the pilot, with a timecode, also exists and is included on the DVD as an extra. This version has a differently-scripted and acted second half, although the ending is similar.)
| 2 | 2 | "Honour Thy Father and Mother" | 17 September 1984 |
Following the events of the previous episode, Alison returns home late at night minus her dress, and her parents are none too pleased by her antics. The following day, Tom goes to the library to return her dress, but finds himself in an altercation with an irate Scotswoman who confuses him for a dodgy car salesman who sold her son a useless car. Alison’s parents later turn up at Tom’s house to confront him, but her mother gets caught up with a group of girls hoping to break the world record for the most people in a phone box, whilst her father is mistaken for Tom by the Scotswoman’s vengeful husband.
| 3 | 3 | "Flowing with the Tide" | 24 September 1984 |
Tom gets into trouble when he finds that his amenities are due to be cut off due to a spate of unpaid bills. He believes that he’s received no post for the past six weeks, but in reality all his mail has been dropped behind the heater. After his phone is disconnected, Tom calls his bank manager from a public phone box and accidentally kills a pet hamster. When he arrives at the bank, he finds his bank manager has been replaced, but his successor promises to help Tom with his financial problems. When Tom returns home later that evening, he receives a shocking surprise.
| 4 | 4 | "The Birthday Party" | 1 October 1984 |
It’s Alison’s birthday shortly, and Tom is busy planning a surprise party for her. His plans go typically awry when his singing telegram arrives several hours early, the caterer puts fake insects in the food and the fur coat he gives to Alison turns out to belong to another man who intended to give to his mistress, which Tom picked by mistake. To add to their woes, they find that all their guests are strangers, after Tom mistakenly contacts them when he confuses the library’s lost property journal for Alison's address book.
| 5 | 5 | "Man of Iron" | 8 October 1984 |
Alison has bought a flat, and soon her nervous cousin Thomas from Hartlepool stays over in order to attend a Cliff Richard concert. Unfortunately, before he arrives he finds himself chased by a dog and lands in wet cement, all due to Tom. Later that evening, Tom and Alison take him to the pub, where a man named Malcolm picks a fight with him, but gets knocked over by a cricket ball. In the car park, Tom is challenged by another man, Terry, who suddenly tears his own clothes and daubs himself in fake blood. After Tom, Alison and her cousin leave the pub, it turns out that Malcolm arranged a fake fight in order to impress his girlfriend. Back at the flat, Tom and Alison have difficulty with the front door which leads to unfortunate consequences for Thomas.
| 6 | 6 | "Stuff of Dreams" | 15 October 1984 |
After getting involved in altercation with her landlord, Alison moves in with Tom. At breakfast, Tom finds that his boat which he won in a competition many years before, has finally been returned after it was stolen shortly after he won it. Soon, Corporal Browning literally drops in on the pair when his parachute gets caught on their tree. After helping him get down, he informs them that he’s on a treasure hunt and inadvertently Tom manages to locate all the items that the corporal has been looking for within the vicinity of his house. Later that evening Alison takes Tom to visit her friends Roger and Susan, but soon tensions boil over when they accidentally expose that Roger has been cheating on his partner.

=== Series 2 (1986) ===
| No. overall | No. in series | Title | Original release date |
|---|---|---|---|
| 7 | 1 | "The Taxman Cometh" | 6 January 1986 |
Tom and Alison find a Portuguese couple on their doorstep, they have come along looking for work at a hotel, only for them to turn up at the wrong place and in the wrong town. Although they are unable to speak English, luckily Alison can speak Portuguese and learns more about their predicament. At the tax office, Tom is confronted by his tax inspector who is alarmed to find why he hasn’t any income despite being relatively well off. Tom confesses he’s been constantly winning premium bonds since 1969. He later forces Tom to marry his daughter Barbara, as he mistakenly believes that he's the father of her unborn child. Alison strives to resolve Tom’s problem and seek out the real father.
| 8 | 2 | "For Whom the Bells Toll" | 13 January 1986 |
It is the day of Barbara and Terrence’s wedding; Alison and Tom are preparing to set off for the church. Penny, another bride turns up when she asks to use their telephone after the horse pulling her carriage suddenly collapses. The vet turns out to be an old flame of hers, and she calls off the wedding. Tom is instructed to drive to the church and inform the groom of the news, only he turns up at the wrong wedding and causes a commotion. At the hotel reception, whilst chaos ensues in the lobby as the respective wedding parties scrap it out, Tom decides to propose to Alison.
| 9 | 3 | "The Lost Weekend" | 20 January 1986 |
After a buzzard damages his windscreen, Tom takes his car to the garage. Yet his comments are mistaken for a code word notifying of a consignment of heroin. Tom is given the package which he confuses for wallpaper paste and offers it to Alison’s father who is decorating. Later they find a brick thrown through a window by an irate drug dealer, and further chaos ensues when Alison’s parents are confused as a pair of trophy thieves at the golf club, and a sniffer dog works out the source of the attacks when it inspects the wallpaper.
| 10 | 4 | "And What Shall We Do For a Ring?" | 27 January 1986 |
Tom is looking for an engagement ring for Alison, upon leaving the jewelers Tom notices a malfunctioning headlight on his car, he unknowingly opens the boot and a robber places the spoils from a recent robbery in his car, since it’s identical to the getaway car. When he meets Alison for tea, she hands him her father’s security briefcase to look after. Only she has picked up the wrong case after the ringleader behind the robbery makes off with her father’s briefcase. Meanwhile Alison’s parents are mistaken for the getaway drivers, whilst at home Tom and Alison discover a large amount of money in the briefcase, and soon the pair are arrested for suspected theft. They face celebrating their engagement in a police cell. Sergeant Gough learns of this misunderstanding and organizes an engagement meal in their cell. As he goes off to get some Champagne, it is discovered that Alison’s parents are being held up in another cell nearby after being caught in Tilbury.
| 11 | 5 | "Winning Streak" | 3 February 1986 |
One morning, Tom finds a huge pair of bricks outside his door. He bribes two boy scouts passing by to help put the bricks away. Later on, in the space of one afternoon Tom manages to win a supermarket trolley dash, place an elderly woman’s groceries in the wrong car and win all the prizes at a charity raffle. Later that evening, they are hosting an American couple Mr and Mrs Burrows for dinner, when they find to their horror that the scouts have placed all the bricks inside the house, and a man digging for treasure in their garden has cut the electricity cable. Tom and Alison have no choice but to improvise, which leads to disastrous consequences.
| 12 | 6 | "Naming the Day" | 10 February 1986 |
Tom has posted an announcement of his engagement to a local newspaper; during Breakfast as he looks in vain through the paper for the announcement, he finds that he’s ended up on the obituary page instead. At the library, he bumps into Joanna, the widow of the deceased man who mistakenly believes he’s survived and kisses him. In retaliation, Alison throws a yoghurt carton at her when she directs Joanna to the noticeboard. Later, Alison sees Reverend Dodge when she has concerns about marrying Tom, in response he asks her about some advice about plumbing. Meanwhile, Tom is painting the front door, just as he goes off for a cup of tea, Joanna wanders into the house thinking it’s her aunt’s. Soon, Tom finds her only clad in a bath towel; as she tries to explain about her predicament, the local press arrive along with Joanna’s irate husband and a soaking wet Vicar.

=== Series 3 (1986) ===
| No. overall | No. in series | Title | Original release date |
|---|---|---|---|
| 13 | 1 | "Goodbye Mr Henstridge" | 27 October 1986 |
Mr. Henstridge, an elderly regular at the library has passed away. Alison persuades Tom to attend his funeral. They get lost on the way to the funeral, and they get caught up with a pair of bird watchers when they ask them for directions. Later outside the church, a wedding party confuses Tom's car for the bride and groom's and decorate it with balloons and crazy string. To their shock they discover that have decorated the wrong car, as the funeral congregation exit the church. At the wake, guests from the wedding reception next door confuse the house for the former, and later Tom and Alison drive to Henstridge’s cottage to clear the contents his wardrobe as instructed on his will, but they soon discover from inspecting the contents of his house to their shock that he wasn’t the kind hearted genial old gentleman she believed him to be.
| 14 | 2 | "Guess Who’s Not Coming to Dinner" | 3 November 1986 |
Tom takes Alison to visit his uncle and cousins for the weekend at their country estate. Alison feels very uneasy about the prospect of being looked down upon due to their upper-class status. However they are equally uneasy about Tom being around the place and his tendency to land himself in coincidental situations, inevitably a spate of misfortune incidents befall his relatives and one by one they find themselves disposed of and ultimately end up in hospital. Later that evening, Tom and Alison find themselves at the family celebratory dinner, dining alone.
| 15 | 3 | "The Blessing" | 10 November 1986 |
Whilst Tom is on a cricketing tour of Norway, Alison’s father try to persuade his daughter not to marry him. Meanwhile Tom's former nanny Mrs Mungo arrives on the scene and begins eating things around the house. Meanwhile Tom rings Alison to tell her that he's at the police station, and she goes off to collects him. At the police station, an animal rights protest is taking place outside, whilst Tom informs Sergeant Gough about being locked in a flight simulator for the entire weekend with a group of trainee Bulgarian pilots. After exiting the airport, in the park he rescued an attendant from a mink attack by whacking it with a cricket bat, whereupon they were chased by 4000 protestors. Tom chats to a snake handler whose 12 foot python sneaks into his luggage when he's not looking. Alison arrives, and she convinces Gough to dress Tom up in disguise as a Policewoman in order to avoid suspicion from the protestors. Later that evening, Tom and Alison host a dinner party, and chaos ensues when the escaped python is let loose.
| 16 | 4 | "The One and Future Chance" | 17 November 1986 |
Tom and Alison are planning the Wedding and discuss about the guest arrangements. Barbara and Terrence arrive and ask them to look after their baby son Maximillian whilst they take his prospective godmother Lady Stocksbridge to lunch. Tom and Alison visit Reverend Dodge to arrange the wedding plans. When they walk back from the church with the pram, Tom goes into a shop to collect a Christening mug and mistakenly walks off with an identical pram and dog, that a woman has just left. At the shopping centre, Tom finds Alison with the correct dog and pram, whilst they discover a pair of toddler aged twins alone a lift. They take the unaccompanied children back to the vicariage, and the police soon arrive and they are arrested on the charge of child abduction. Sergeant Gough discovers about the mix up and drops the charges, inadvertently due to all the confusion they end up ruining the Christening and manage to get Lady Stocksbridge arrested.
| 17 | 5 | "Pre-Matrimonial Tensions" | 24 November 1986 |
It is the day before Tom and Alison’s wedding. She is very enthusiastic about the prospect, whilst Tom conversely is far from hopeful due to his concerns that everything will go wrong. Tom discovers in his car, a large cache of photographs featuring a scantily clad woman in a wedding dress. Later at the photography studio he tries to report it to the police when he finds out that the wedding photographer Mr Benson left the catchment in his car. At the travel office, they appeal to the travel operator Mr. Mitchell when they discover that their plane tickets for their Honeymoon have been diverted to the wrong location. Tom blurts out about the photographs and Mitchell discovers that his daughter has been modelling for them. He decides to get his revenge on the photographer and heads down to the studio.
| 18 | 6 | "The Wedding" | 1 December 1986 |
Tom and Alison are hosting a vicars and tarts party for the Wedding Eve celebrations, however they are unaware that their guests are stuck down a sewer following the commotion at the photography studio. Alison gets arrested at an off-licence when she is accused of soliciting, whilst Tom gets himself caught up with a group of genuine clergymen and also gets arrested along with the rest of the group when the police suspect there's a thief among them who is known to disguise himself as a Vicar. At the police station, Sergeant Gough finally realizes what has gone on and releases them, and sends out a Vicar to accompany them in order to make sure they get married.

== Home releases ==
| DVD | Release date |
|---|---|
| The Complete Series 1 | 1 March 2010 |
| The Complete Series 2 | 5 July 2010 |
| The Complete Series 3 | 4 October 2010 |
| The Complete Series 1 to 3 Box Set | 4 October 2010 |

== Notes ==
Speaking about the series following its release on DVD Simon Callow said: "I loved doing it and it's one of the most popular things I ever did. The central character, Tom Chance, was a guy who was plagued by coincidence that was the basic formula of the series. The charming thing about him was that he seemed to belong to another world completely. He spoke in the most extraordinary way, which I think was derived from Mr. Jingle in The Pickwick Papers – he never used the personal pronouns ... He'd say, "... went to bank ... had problem ... sat down ... couldn't get out ... killed a woman ... very sad...". Brenda Blethyn, she's absolutely superb in it. Brenda and I and the writers are desperately keen to do a series, 25 years later on ... same couple ... I think it would be wonderful."

Brenda Blethyn, in her 2006 autobiography Mixed Fancies, speaks of the series at length with clear affection and happy memories of the project.
