= Scary Little Girls =

- Founded: 2002
- Founder: Rebecca Mordan
- Type: Production Hub and Charity
- Registration no.: 1136270
- Purpose: Literary and matrifocal themes, Comedy, Cabaret
- Location(s): London and Cornwall
- Website: Scary Little Girls

Scary Little Girls is an English production hub based in London and Cornwall and a charity registered in England and Wales under charity number 1136270. Most of their work revolves around literary and matrifocal themes, as well as a number of comedy and cabaret works with predominantly female casts. Rather than working primarily a set genre or using a regular group of practitioners, the company looks to seek out artists of all ages, backgrounds and interests from multiple artistic fields. A key tenet of SLG projects is that must headline, promote or employ more women than men.

SLG say that their three main objectives are: 1. To tell stories and promote characters which are little known, historically or culturally excluded, or usually told from one perspective only. 2. To actively promote the artistic work of women in all aspects of theatrical storytelling. 3. To share and disseminate the skills of artists for the benefit of both the artistic and the wider community.

== History ==
Scary Little Girls was founded in 2002 by Rebecca Mordan and became an official charity in 2005 when Sharon Andrew joined as co-artistic director. Andrew left SLG in January 2017 to become a meditation teacher and founded the Cornish Meditation Centre, though she remains a creative consultant for SLG.

Between 2002 and 2005, Scary Little Girls did various school workshops, a production of Dracula (2003) with a female Dracula and a production of Maria Stuart (2005). During this time, Scary Little Girls also produced Mother Mae I! Part of the resurgence of cabaret in London in the early 21st century, this piece features acts such as puppetry, musical comedy, stand up, grotesques and magic. The event is either hosted by Riot Showgrrls, Bunny Morethan or the de Plumes, and in keeping with SLG's ethos, most of the performers are women. The show later had residences at The Oak Bar in Newington Green and at the Camden Head in Angel.

== Theatrical productions ==
=== General ===
Scary Little Girls has mainly been active in England. Previous shows include: The Ladies' Cage (2007), which focuses on Anna Parnell and the women of the Ladies Land League. It is set in the 1890s in the English and Irish land wars of the era. The production uses research material by Professor Margaret Ward, and her previously unpublished research on Anna Parnell.

In 2007, the company was funded by the Duke of Cornwall Benevolent Fund to produce a series of "Positive Behavior" sessions at Ludgvan Community Primary School Suffragettes: 100 Years (2009) was a joint project with Naomi Paxton. There were readings of plays by members of the Actresses' Franchise League, followed by talks by academics and actors. The event launched a book of plays, many of which had previously been unpublished.

=== Larger productions ===
==== Dracula: The Kisses ====
Dracula: The Kisses, with its all-female cast and new text, explores gender and queer themes in a gothic steampunk setting. The play was written by Rebecca Mordan and directed by Helen Tennison. The show's first run was 22–26 September 2014 at the Minack Theatre in Cornwall. The show then went up to Birmingham to perform at the mac Birmingham and performed there 30–31 October 2014.

==== Duffy Beats the Devil ====
In December 2015, Scary Little Girls put on their first pantomime in co-production with The Acorn Theater Penzance. Duffy Beats the Devil was an all-women pantomime that adapted a local folk story to Penzance.

==== Peter Pan ====
In 2016, Scary Little Girls put on an all-female production of JM Barrie's original 1904 script for Peter Pan.

Later that year, Scary Little Girls worked with Ramps on the Moon, a deaf and disabled artist integration project, to workshop their all-female interpretation of Peter Pan. The workshop paired three SLG actors (hearing, able-bodied) and three ROTM actors (one deaf, two disabled) with Cornish designers and artists to form a creative team. These creative teams were tasked with turning Peter Pan into an indoor show for mid-scale touring and a diverse cast.

==== Before I Wake ====
Before I Wake was an original script that highlighted the real-life workers of the Heligan Gardens, many of whom later died in WWII.

=== Literary shows ===
==== Living Literature Walks ====
Living Literature Walks are theatrical walks that take a small group through a town to explore its history.

Living Literature Walks themes have included actresses and suffragettes (Stage Rights), the Mitford Sisters (In the Footsteps of the Mitfords), Cornish All Hallows (Something Wicked), Cornish Christmas (Warm Hearths and Frosty Shores), Women of World War I (Women at War: The West End), Frankenstein (Frankenstein), railways (Strangers on a Train), banned texts (Salon du Chocolat), Mary Wollstonecraft (Wollstonecraft Walks), Agatha Christie (2018 Agatha Christie Festival), Suffrage heritage (Suffrage Salons).

In response to the COVID lockdowns of 2020, Scary Little Girls started Salon de la Vie, online interactive fortnightly cabarets that celebrated women's art and literature.

=== Stories in the Shelves ===
In 2016, Scary Little Girls began touring Cornish libraries with their four most popular small scale shows. This tour expanded on a 2015/16 pilot of eight Cornish libraries to a tour of 19 regional libraries.

==== Literary Cabarets ====
Many of Scary Little Girls' shows have literary themes, including their Literary Cabarets and Living Literature Walks. Their literary cabarets include: The Best of Times: a Charles Dickens Literary Cabaret — a 3-woman cabaret based on the life of Charles Dickens that focuses on his personal life; Wilde Nights a show inspired by Oscar Wilde that was commissioned by Brighton Fringe; and The Full Brontë a homage to the Brontë sisters.

==== Edinburgh Fringe Festival ====
In 2008, Scary Little Girls brought The Riot Showgrrls Club to the Edinburgh Fringe Festival. The show was a pro-sex, anti-porn cabaret performed at The Gilded Balloon. It was written and performed by Rebecca Mordan and Kate Kerrow. In 2009, they then took the show to the Glastonbury Festival.

In 2013, the company went to the Fringe for The Full Bronte, a literary cabaret based on the lives of the Brontë sisters. The show was originally developed with The Theatre Chipping Norton before enjoying a sell-out run in Edinburgh and national tours.

In 2015, the company performed Salon du Chocolat at the Voodoo Rooms from 8–18 August. The salon included excerpts from banned books such as Lady Chatterley's Lover and The Well of Loneliness by Radclyffe Hall. It also included music by The Dresden Dolls and Annie Lennox.

==== Sea Cry Saga ====
A 2019 performance based on the history of the Vikings in Cornwall. The co-production with Creation Theatre was performed in the summer of 2019 on Chapel Porth beach.

=== Comedic small shows ===
==== It's Your Round ====
It's Your Round is a performative pub quiz that combines theatre with a traditional British pub quiz. It's Your Round later transformed into Game On to adapt to a new TV game show format and reach more audiences.

==== Sorry I Haven't a Minute ====
Sorry I Haven't a Minute follows a fictional radio program team as they undertake their first on-the-road live recording.

== Cultural work ==
=== Greenham Women Everywhere ===
==== Archiving ====
In 2018, Scary Little Girls began travelling the country for 18 months to interview the women who formed the Greenham Common Women's Peace Camp. Funded by The Heritage Lottery South West, this is the largest collection of oral testimonies of the women yet collated, digitised and made available to the public.

==== Exhibition ====
Scary Little Girls then toured a pop-up Greenham exhibition co-produced with "The Heroine Collective" featuring question and answer sessions with some of the women who lived at the camp. The exhibition also allowed visitors to listen to a soundscape while exploring a Greenham-inspired tent which contained a collage of pictures, banners and slogans from the archives. The tour was funded by a public GoFundMe campaign.

==== Art ====
Scary Little Girls worked with Falmouth University students to create animations based on the experiences and stories recorded in the archives. They also used the archived footage to create a narrative game in which players can speak with women at the camp.

==== Independent organization ====
In 2019, Scary Little Girls partnered with The Heroine Collective to create Greenham Women Everywhere, a National Heritage Lottery Fund supported project, to bring this hugely important piece of often overlooked protest feminist heritage into the public realm. The work began with an 18-month project to interview the women who, between 1981 and 2000, formed the Greenham Common Peace Camp to protest against nuclear weapons being placed at RAF Greenham Common in Berkshire.

==== Greenham Women Digital ====
In response to Covid, Scary Little Girls created GreenhamWomen.digital to allow audiences to explore Greenham at home with an interactive experience.

=== Anna Maria Fox ===
In 2016, Scary Little Girls embarked on a year of community-centred events celebrating the 200th birthday of Anna Maria Fox, one of Falmouth's foremost historic figures and founder of The Poly. The project gathered oral testimonies from members of the Fox family, local residents with ties to Anna Maria's legacy, and people associated with the gardens, arts school buildings and societies she founded. These histories were then commemorated around the time with special blue fox plaques, linked together into a heritage trail by an app developed in partnership with Falmouth Arts School and University. Through the project, Scary Little Girls collaborated with The Poly, Falmouth University, Falmouth School of Art, Mawnan Church of England VA Primary School, the Fox family, Falmouth History Group and heritage volunteers to document Anna Maria Fox.

=== Wild Woman's Hour ===
In 2013, Scary Little Girls won an award from the National Institute of Adult Continuing Education (NIACE) for Wild Woman's Hour. Wild Woman's Hour is a monthly radio programme created and presented by women. It was jointly created by Scary Little Girls and Radio St. Austell Bay to give women a platform to discuss their experiences and help them develop new skills. The project was funded by Feast, a programme of the Cornwall Arts Centre Trust, an Arts Council National portfolio organization.

== Film ==
Following a successful Kickstarter campaign, Scary Little Girls' filmed "Culling," a short film set in a dystopian future where a lifesaving cure is scarce and a doctor finds herself in a moral compromise. The screenplay was written and co-produced by Kate Kerrow. The film is set to release in late 2014.

== R&D ==
In 2017, Scary Little Girls began developing Truth Before Everything, which explored the life of Josephine Butler, the Victorian sexual health and women's rights campaigner, through a modern lens.

== Associate artists (selected) ==
- Kate Smurthwaite
- Joannah Tincey
- Sally Mortemore
