= Self Storage (radio series) =

BBC radio comedy

Self-Storage
- Genre: Situation comedy
- Running time: 15 minutes
- Country of origin: United Kingdom
- Language: English
- Home station: BBC Radio 4
- Starring: Reece Shearsmith; Mark Heap; Tom Goodman-Hill
- Written by: Tom Collinson and Barnaby Power
- Produced by: Ed Morrish
- Original release: 19 September 2007 – 10 December 2008
- No. of series: 2
- No. of episodes: 12
- Audio format: Stereophonic sound
- Website: https://www.bbc.co.uk/programmes/b00f8174

Self-Storage is a situation comedy series which aired on BBC Radio 4. The show ran for a two series of six episodes and first aired in September 2007. It starred Reece Shearsmith, Mark Heap and Tom Goodman-Hill, and was written by Tom Collinson and Barnaby Power.

== Cast ==
- Reece Shearsmith as Dave
- Mark Heap as Geoff
- Tom Goodman-Hill as Ron

== Plot ==
Dave (Shearsmith) has seen his marriage break-up and finds himself living in a storage unit called the Storage Garden, where his belongings are also being kept. He is accompanied by fellow self storage inhabitant Geoff (Heap) and security guard Ron (Goodman-Hill).

The second series finds Dave living in the Storage Garden with his sister after her marriage breaks down.

== Episodes ==
=== Series 1 (2007) ===
No. overall	No. in series	Title	Original release date
1	1	"Break-Up"	19 September 2007
2	2	"House Hunting"	26 September 2007
3	3	"Job Hunting"	3 October 2007
4	4	"Family"	10 October 2007
5	5	"Dating"	17 October 2007
6	6	"Leaving"	24 October 2007

=== Series 2 (2008) ===
Episodes in series two did not use titles. Series Two was written by Tom Collinson.

No. overall	No. in series	Title	Original release date
7	1	"Episode One"	5 November 2008
8	2	"Episode Two"	12 November 2008
9	3	"Episode Three"	19 November 2008
10	4	"Episode Four"	26 November 2008
11	5	"Episode Five"	3 December 2008
12	6	"Episode Six"	10 November 2008

== Media ==
The second series was made available to purchase on Audible on 29 December 2010.
