= Simon Bovey =

British scriptwriter and director

Simon Bovey (born 1960), is a British scriptwriter and director. He has written several science fiction dramas for BBC Radio, as well as episodes of the daytime drama Doctors.

== Partial list of credits ==
=== Film and video ===
- The Waiting (2000) - writer and director. A psychodrama set among a group of career criminals.
- The Un-gone (2007) - writer and director. A science fiction short feature concerning teleportation.

=== Television ===
- Doctors episodes For Love (2005) and Burdens (2011).

=== Radio ===
- Slipstream - Extraterrestrial technology at the end of the Second World War.
- The Voice of God - Acoustic experiments on Australian aboriginal sacred lands disturb the earth.
- Cold Blood - A mysterious survivor of the cold arrives at an Antarctic research station.
- Hive Mind - Bees are extinct and have been replaced by honeybots, with disturbing consequences.
- The Iceman - Forensic science and a serial killer in 1880s London.
- Franklin - Cartoonist Charles Schulz receives a letter in 1968 suggesting he add a black character to his "Peanuts" cartoon strip.
- City of Spires - A Doctor Who audio drama for Big Finish Productions.
- The Launch - Ex-Battle of Britain pilot Jack Avery is determined to avenge his brother's death.
- Sargasso - Elver season on the River Severn - a time of mystery and danger. The wrong time and place for a young man to search for his place in the world.
