= Jonathan Ruffle =

British writer, director and producer

Jonathan Ruffle is a British writer, director and producer who has made TV and radio programmes for the BBC, ITV and Channel 4.

At one time Steve Wright's and Simon Bates’s radio producer on BBC Radio 1, he left to produce the acclaimed BBC radio drama version of Len Deighton’s Bomber, and the award-winning 1995 Channel 4 documentary Edward VIII: The Traitor King.

He then split his career in two new directions: airshow and event commentary, and TV comedy writing including Never Mind the Buzzcocks.

In 2009 he took his real-time First World War drama idea Tommies to the BBC which began its four and half year transmission in October 2014. He still produces comedy shows for the BBC with Andrew McGibbon and writes TV scripts and feature film projects for GB Films.
