= Tom Goodman-Hill =

British actor (born 1968)

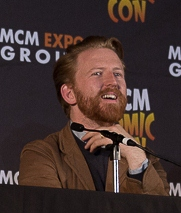
- Goodman-Hill at the 2015 MCM London Comic Con
- Born: 21 May 1968 (age 58)
- Education: Royal Grammar School, Newcastle upon Tyne; University of Warwick
- Occupation: Actor
- Years active: 1990–present
- Spouse(s): Kerry Bradley (m. 2005; div. 2014) Jessica Raine (m. 2015)
- Children: 3
- Relatives: Max Hill (brother)

Tom Goodman-Hill (born 21 May 1968) is an English actor in film, television, theatre, and radio. He has appeared in several television series, including Spy (2011–2012), Mr Selfridge (2013–2016), Humans (2015–2018), and Baby Reindeer (2024), the lattermost of which earned him a Primetime Emmy Award nomination.

In 2007, he was nominated for a Laurence Olivier Award for his performance as Sir Lancelot in the original West End production of the musical Spamalot.

== Early life and education ==
Tom Goodman-Hill grew up in Northumberland, and was educated at the Royal Grammar School in Newcastle upon Tyne. He regularly acted in amateur performances at the People's Theatre, Newcastle upon Tyne.

Goodman-Hill earned a BA in Drama and English with a teaching qualification from the University of Warwick, where he took an active role in student drama. He spent a year as a supply teacher in Coventry before moving to London to pursue a full-time acting career.

== Career ==
=== Film ===
In The League of Extraordinary Gentlemen, Goodman-Hill played Sanderson Reed opposite Sean Connery. He is also known for playing Sgt. Stahl in The Imitation Game and Neal Beidleman in Baltasar Kormakur's Everest in 2015. In 2020, Goodman-Hill played Frank Crawley in Ben Wheatley's film of the Daphne du Maurier classic Rebecca.

=== Television ===
Goodman-Hill is known for playing Joe Hawkins in Humans. He played the police constable in Ideal. He appeared in the Jonathan Creek episode "Miracle in Crooked Lane" as Jeff, an episode of Murder in Mind, series 5 of BBC One's Hustle as Alfie Baron and as the Reverend Golightly in the Doctor Who episode "The Unicorn and the Wasp".

He has had recurring parts in several comedies, including The Office as Ray, and Broken News. He also appeared as Brick Beckham in time-travelling comedy Goodnight Sweetheart.

In 2008, Goodman-Hill played John Lilburne in Channel 4's period drama, The Devil's Whore. Goodman-Hill can trace his father's family back to Lilburne's Uncle Joseph, through 16 generations.

In 2011, he played Neil Hunter in the drama Case Histories starring Jason Isaacs and in 2011 in Spy. In 2013–2016, Goodman-Hill played Roger Grove in the ITV series Mr Selfridge and Dr Mawsley in The Thirteenth Tale for the BBC. He also appeared in episode 4 of series one of Call the Midwife and as Maurice Jones in a 2014 episode of ITV's Foyle's War entitled "The Russian House". In 2015 he starred in Channel 4's Humans. He has also narrated all current seasons of Ultimate Airport Dubai.

In July 2016, Goodman-Hill played Assistant Commissioner Stone in the BBC's three-part television adaptation of Joseph Conrad's 1907 novel The Secret Agent.

In March 2019, Goodman-Hill played Adam, the husband of Leah, in the ITV drama Cheat.

In February 2020, Goodman-Hill played DI Hewson in the BBC's Inside Number 9 in an episode called "Misdirection".

Goodman-Hill played Darrien O'Connor, a sexual abuser, in Netflix's Baby Reindeer, released in April 2024. His performance earned a nomination for a Primetime Emmy Award for Outstanding Supporting Actor in a Limited or Anthology Series or Movie.

In 2026, Goodman-Hill played a minor part in Two Weeks in August, a British drama series created by Catherine Shepherd. Goodman-Hill's wife, Jessica Raine, played the lead character, Zoe. In a five-star review, The Guardian said that Goodman-Hill played his "dreadful" character James "with glee".

=== Advertising ===
Goodman-Hill has been involved in advertisements for television and radio, the most prolific of which being the voice of Tyrannosaurus Alan in a series of four televised advertisements for Volvic mineral water, alongside Matt Berry.

=== Radio ===
Goodman-Hill has played numerous roles in various BBC Radio 4 productions, including: Jesus in Witness: Five Plays from the Gospel of Luke; Anton in The House of Milton Jones, Another Case of Milton Jones and Thanks a Lot, Milton Jones!; Ron, the security guard, in Self-Storage; Archie in three series of Hut 33; Claudius in I, Claudius; Martin in the episode "Newcastle" in the third series of Cabin Pressure; Mason in My First Planet, and Søndergaard in the episode "Penguin Diplomacy" in the second series of John Finnemore's Double Acts.

=== Theatre ===
Goodman-Hill started his professional career in the theatre. He has since appeared in productions such as Pete and Dud: Come Again as Peter Cook and The Cosmonaut's Last Message to the Woman He Once Loved in the Former Soviet Union as Eric.

He received a Laurence Olivier Award nomination for the Best Performance in a Supporting Role in a Musical for his performance as Sir Lancelot (and other roles, mostly those played by John Cleese in the original film Monty Python and the Holy Grail), in the London production of Spamalot.

In 2009, he played Andrew Fastow, the former real-life CFO of Enron in Lucy Prebble's ENRON at Chichester and the Royal Court Theatre. The production transferred to the Noël Coward Theatre in January 2010 and in the interim he replaced Mark Gatiss in Darker Shores at the Hampstead Theatre during December 2009. Early in 2017 he appeared as David Owen in Limehouse at the Donmar Warehouse.

He is a patron of Scene & Heard, a charity providing theatre-based experiences for young people in Somers Town, London.

== Personal life ==
Goodman-Hill's first marriage was to Kerry Bradley; they were a couple for 20 years and had two children together – a son and a daughter, aged 22 and 20 as of March 2019. He started a relationship with actress Jessica Raine, after meeting her during the 2010 National Theatre's production of Earthquakes in London. Goodman-Hill divorced Bradley and married Raine on 30 August 2015; the couple have a child together, born in February 2019.

== Filmography ==
=== Film ===
Year	Title	Role	Notes
1996	In Love and War	Houston Kenyan	
2001	Charlotte Gray	Business Man at Party	
2002	The One and Only	Kitchen Salesman	
2003	The League of Extraordinary Gentlemen	Sanderson Reed	
2004	Fat Slags	Barry "Baz" Askwith	
2005	Festival	Dougie MacLachlan	
2009	Glorious 39	—N/a	Director
2011	Chalet Girl	Les	
2011	7 Lives	Peter	
2014	The Imitation Game	Sergeant Staehl	
2014	Down Dog	Dr. Hill	
2015	Everest	Neal Beidleman	
2016	The Truth Commissioner	Jake Marston	
2017	The Rizen	Number 37	
2018	Where Hands Touch	Wilhelm Warner	
2020	Rebecca	Frank Crawley	
2021	The War Below	Hellfire Jack	
2021	Homebound	Richard	
2024	Robin and the Hoods	Nick	
2025	Fackham Hall	Inspector Robert Watt	

=== Television ===
Year	Title	Role	Notes
1990	Coasting	Uncredited	Episode: "Illuminations"
1994	Licence to Live	Policeman	TV film
1996	No Bananas	Lt. Johnson	Episode: "Dunkirk"
1999	Goodnight Sweetheart	Brick	Episode: "Just in Time"
1999	People Like Us	PC David Knight	Episode: "The Police Officer"
1999	Jonathan Creek	Jeff	Episode: "Miracle in Crooked Lane"
2000	Border Cafe	Max	8 episodes
2000	A Dinner of Herbs	Hal Roystan	4 episodes
2001	Barbara	Coggins	Episode: "Mate"
2001	Murder in Mind	David	Episode: "Vigilante"
2001	Heartbeat	Patrick Mason	Episode: "Legacies"
2001	The Lost World	Arthur Hare	2 episodes
2001	Combat Sheep		TV film
2002	Sunday	Para H	TV film
2002	Spooks	Nick Thomas (uncredited)	Episode: "Looking After Our Own"
2002	The Office	Ray	3 episodes
2003	George Orwell: A Life in Pictures	Derek Savage	TV film
2003	Death in Holy Orders	Eric Surtees	2 episodes
2004	The Worst Week of My Life	Ben	3 episodes
2004	Fungus the Bogeyman	Tony	3 episodes
2005	Kenneth Tynan: In Praise of Hardcore	Michael White	TV film
2005	Murder in Suburbia	Doug Bannister	Episode: "Witches"
2005	Beethoven	Anton Schindler	Episode: "Faith & Fury"
2005	Gideon's Daughter	Dent	TV film
2005	Spoons	Various	6 episodes
2005	Perfect Day	Tom	TV film
2005	My Family and Other Animals	Peter	TV film
2005	Broken News	Joe Reed – Movie News; Guy Batson – Go Sports	6 episodes
2005–2011	Ideal	PC	46 episodes
2006	Uncle Max	Manager	Episode: "Uncle Max Goes Bowling"
2006	Green Wing	Politician	1 episode
2006	Fear of Fanny	Dan Farson	TV film
2006	Perfect Day: The Millennium	Tom	TV film
2006	Perfect Day: The Funeral	Tom	Miniseries
2007	Miss Austen Regrets	Mr Lushington MP	TV film
2007	After You've Gone	David Henderson	Episode: "And So This Is Christmas"
2008	Never Better	Richard	6 episodes
2008	Lewis	Richard Helm	Episode: "Music to Die For"
2008	Clay	Mr Parker	TV film
2008	Doctor Who	Reverend Golightly	Episode: "The Unicorn and the Wasp"
2008	Midsomer Murders	Tristan Balliol	Episode: "The Magician's Nephew"
2008	The Devil's Whore	John Lilburne	4 episodes
2009	Hustle	Alfie Baron	1 episode
2009	Moses Jones	DCI Dick Catherwood	3 episodes
2009	Free Agents	Malcolm	3 episodes
2009	The Omid Djalili Show		3 episodes
2009	Inspector George Gently	Sam Draper	Episode: "Gently Through the Mill"
2009	Big Top	Advert voice-over	Episode: "Visa"
2010	Foyle's War	Maurice Jones	Episode: "The Russian House"
2011	Waking the Dead	Tristin	2 episodes
2011	Candy Cabs	Barry O'Sullivan	3 episodes
2011	Case Sensitive	Steve Harboard	2 episodes
2011	Case Histories	Neil Hunter	2 episodes
2011	Doc Martin	Mark Bridge	2 episodes
2011	Black Mirror	Tom Bilce	Episode: "The National Anthem"
2011–2012	Spy	Phillip / Philip	18 episodes
2012	Call the Midwife	David Jones	Episode: "Baby Snatcher"
2012	The Hollow Crown	Sir Stephen Scroop	Episode: "Richard II"
2012	Dead Boss	Tim	6 episodes
2013	The Thirteenth Tale	Dr. Mawsley	TV film
2013–2016	Mr Selfridge	Roger Grove	38 episodes
2015	Residue	Keller	3 episodes
2015–2018	Humans	Joe Hawkins	24 episodes
2016	The Nightmare Worlds of H. G. Wells	Father Morton	Episode: "The Moth"
2016	The Secret Agent	AC Stone	3 episodes
2017	Drunk History		Episode: "Suffragettes/Agincourt"
2019	Cheat	Adam	Main role; 4 episodes
2020	Silent Witness	AC Tim Holloway	2 episodes
2020	Inside No. 9	DI Hewson	Episode: "Misdirection"
2020	Housebound	Gavin Burns	1 episode
2020	Soulmates	Doug	Episode: "The (Power) Ballad of Caitlin Jones"
2022	Anne	Jack Straw	1 episode
2024	Baby Reindeer	Darrien O'Connor	2 episodes Nominated – Primetime Emmy Award for Outstanding Supporting Actor in a Limited or Anthology Series or Movie
2026	Lord of the Flies	Naval Officer	Episode: "Ralph"

=== Video games ===
Year	Title	Voice role	Notes
2003	Hidden & Dangerous 2		
2004	Harry Potter and the Prisoner of Azkaban	Peter Pettigrew	
2005	Harry Potter and the Goblet of Fire	Peter Pettigrew	
2005	Shinobido: Way of the Ninja	Zaji 'The Hawk'	English version
2008	Viking: Battle for Asgard		
2009	Killzone 2	Additional Helghast voices	
2011	The Last Story	Asthar	
2011	Killzone 3	Helghast Soldiers	
2012	ZombiU	Dr. Peter Knight	
2013	Soul Sacrifice	Additional voices	
2013	Ryse: Son of Rome	Additional voices	
2015	The Witcher 3: Wild Hunt	Damien	English version
2016	Battlefield 1		
