= Bernard's Watch =

British children's TV series (1997–2001 and 2004–2005)

- David Peachey as Bernard in the opening title used throughout the original run of the series (1997–2001)
- Created by: Andrew Norriss
- Directed by: David Cobham
- Starring: David Peachey; Martin Nei; Ruth Hudson; Barry Jackson; Phoebe Allen; Samantha Birch; Ryan Watson; Ezrah Roberts-Grey; Rosie Day
- Narrated by: Liza Goddard
- No. of series: 7
- No. of episodes: 79 (list of episodes)

Production
- Executive producer: Lewis Rudd
- Production companies: Central Independent Television (Seasons 1–5); Carlton Television (Season 6); Granada Yorkshire (Season 7)

Original release
- Network: ITV (CITV)
- Release: 14 November 1997 – 31 March 2005

Bernard's Watch (informally known as Bernard in the reboot series) is a British children's drama series about a young boy who could stop time with a magical pocket watch. The show was created by Andrew Norriss and was produced for seven series that aired on CITV from 14 November 1997 to 31 March 2005.

== History ==
The concept of the show originally formed the basis of one of the most famous episodes of The Twilight Zone, entitled "A Kind of a Stopwatch", first broadcast in 1963. In 1991, Alexander John Howard conceived of a series based on the same concept but it took six years to get funding. The show eventually began as a single 15-minute episode; however, it was suggested it could work as a series. Four more stories were written by creator Andrew Norriss, who thought, in his own words, "that would be it". However, he ended up writing six series.

The original series aired from 14 November 1997 to 7 December 2001 and was produced by Central Television. It was written by Norriss, who also wrote the book "Bernard's Watch", a novelisation based on the first three series, which was published in 1999 by Puffin. It was filmed in and around Nottingham with the school scenes shot at South Wilford CofE Primary School in the first four series. These series were produced by Lewis Rudd and directed by David Cobham.

Three years after its original run, the show was revived for two more series and included a change to the format and new cast and filming location. The first of the new series was produced by Carlton Television and aired from 6 January to 30 March 2004. The second of the new series, and the seventh and final of the show overall, was renamed Bernard, produced by Granada Yorkshire and aired from 6 January to 31 March 2005. The school scenes were filmed at Kerr Mackie Primary School in Leeds.

== Synopsis ==
=== Original series (1997–2001) ===
The first run told of a young boy called Bernard, played by David Peachey, from Oakwood, Nottinghamshire, who was always late, until a postman gave him a "magic watch" which could stop time. He soon found out that the postman had magical powers, and that these watches were given to people who needed them. The rules of him keeping his watch were that he must not use it to commit crimes or hurt anyone. Every episode focused on Bernard or someone to whom he'd lent the watch facing a problem or simply doing day-to-day things and trying to sort them out, using the watch.

=== New series (2004–2005) ===
The second run was significantly different to the original. According to the final opening sequence, the watch simply flew through Bernard's window. The character of the "postman" did not exist, and Bernard seemed to be the only person in the world who had such a watch. His best friend Nathan knew about the watch. This series revolved mainly around Bernard's school, Pentup Primary, where he'd usually get the better of his bullying school teacher Ms Yvonne Savage and a popular girl called Nicolette who is his arch rival.

=== Novel ===
As well as the TV series, Andrew Norriss also wrote a novelisation based on the first three series of the show in 1999. In the context of the novel, Bernard received the watch from an elderly aunt, who had received it from her husband who acquired it from an old friend, although they never knew how the friend had obtained the watch as by the time he passed it on he had suffered a stroke and couldn't speak. Unlike in the TV show where using the watch was harmless, the watch has a subtle side-effect on the user in that it uses up the iron molecules in their blood, leaving regular users vulnerable to anaemia requiring them to consume iron supplements on a regular basis, causing Bernard to collapse when he avoids taking the iron-tainted drink provided by his aunt because he didn't like the taste and was unaware of the side-effects of the watch. On a personal note, Bernard is only living with his father, as his mother died before the events of the novel, and Karen is also shown as living with a single parent with her mother having divorced before she was born. At the novel's conclusion, the watch is briefly stolen by a woman who once worked as a housekeeper for Bernard's aunt, but she is captured when the watch runs down and she tries to threaten Bernard for the key. Ill at various points throughout the book, Bernard's aunt dies in the penultimate chapter, but her spirit appears to him after her death to tell him that the true purpose of the watch is for 'learning'. In the final chapter, Bernard uses the watch key on a chain his aunt gave him to wind it back up, Bernard and Karen enjoying the restoration of the watch as Bernard concludes that he has time to learn what she meant by that comment.

== Main cast ==
=== Original series: 1997–2001 ===
- Narrator – Liza Goddard
- Bernard Beasley – David Peachey
- Postman – Jack McKenzie
- Mr John Beasley – Martin Neil
- Mrs Jane Beasley – Ruth Hudson
- Grandad – Barry Jackson
- Miss Picot – Perry Neville
- Karen Hewitt – Phoebe Allen (series 1–3)
- Mr Terrence Hewitt – Philip Childs (series 2–3)
- Mrs Sue Hewitt – Clare Beck (series 1-3)
- George the burglar – Al Hunter Ashton (series 3)
- Lucy Rownham – Elizabeth Mellor (series 3-4)
- Mrs Rownham – Jaq Croft (series 3)
- Mr Rattle – Leslie Grantham (series 3)
- American Postman – Derek Griffiths (series 4)
- Sam Vernon – Samantha Birch (series 5)
- Aunt Rowena – Victoria Wicks (series 5)

=== New series: 2004–05 ===
- Bernard Beasley – Ryan Watson
- Nathan Roberts – Ezrah Roberts-Grey
- Nicolette – Rosie Day
- Ms Yvonne Savage – Kay Purcell
- Mr William Steel – Martin Ball
- Mr Ken Beasley – Steven Houghton
- Mrs Sonia Beasley – Amanda Abbington
- Charlie – Ian Kirkby (series 1)
- Trish – Lily Smith (series 1)
- Danni – Paige Harris (series 1)
- Floyd – Robert Horwell (series 2)
- Andi – Taylor Bourke (series 2)
- Hayley – Katie Pearson (series 2)
- Blake – Freddie Bolt (series 2)
- Jo – Sophie Carrigill (series 2)

== Home video releases ==
The whole of the first series and the first six episodes of the second series of the original run of the show were released on VHS shortly after they were first aired aimed at children aged 7 to 12 each with a U certificate. One episode at a time has been available to stream on BritBox and Apple TV over 2020s.
