= Jack Remmington =

English media personality (born 1994)

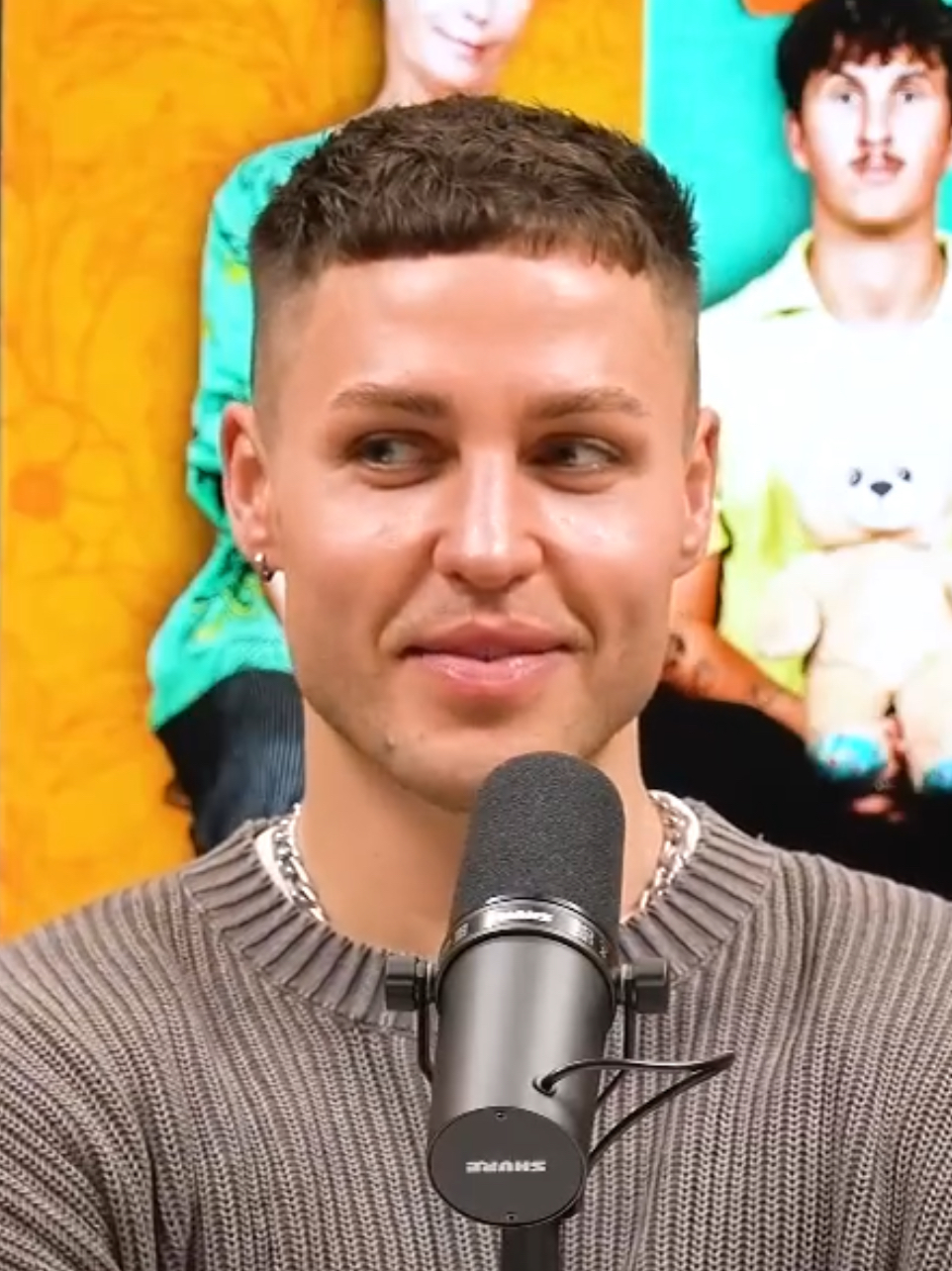
- Remmington in 2024
- Born: 12 October 1994 (age 32); Gainsborough, Lincolnshire, England
- Education: University of Oxford
- Occupations: Influencer; presenter
- Years active: 2015–present

Jack Remmington (born 12 October 1994) is an English social media influencer and presenter. After appearing as a contestant on the fourteenth series of The X Factor in 2017, he has gone on to amass an online following through social media. He has gone on to host various series, including fronting a podcast with close friend Ash Holme and co-presenting various BBC Radio shows and podcasts.

== Life and career ==
Remmington was born on 12 October 1994 in Gainsborough, Lincolnshire. He is gay. He studied at Keble College at the University of Oxford, where he became friends with singer Joel Fishel. Together, they formed a duo and released a medley of Ed Sheeran songs to raise funds for terminally ill children and young adults at a local hospice. In 2017, the pair auditioned for the fourteenth series of The X Factor. They progressed through to the "judges' houses" portion of the competition, where they were eliminated by mentor Simon Cowell. However, they were voted to join the live shows by the general public, as a "wildcard" act. They finished in twelfth place, after being eliminated in the third week of the competition.

In 2023, alongside Ash Holme, who he had met on The X Factor, Remmington co-presented For You Page on BBC Radio 1 on Christmas. Then, since 2024, he has starred in The Jack and Ash Show, a YouTube series and podcast, alongside Holme. In 2024, he became the co-presenter of Famously... In Love, a BBC Sounds podcast, alongside Sarel.

In early 2025, Remmington co-hosted the red carpet digital content for the British Academy Film Awards, alongside Holme. Remmington and Holme returned as presenters for BBC Radio 1, in the early morning breakfast slot, in October 2025. October 2025 also saw the pair become faces for an eBay campaign. That same month, Remmington was a panellist on ITV2's Big Brother: Late & Live.

== Filmography ==
| Year | Title | Role | Notes |
|---|---|---|---|
| 2017 | The X Factor | Contestant | Series 14 |
| 2024–present | The Jack and Ash Show | Himself | Main role |
| 2025 | Big Brother: Late & Live | Himself | Panellist |

== Audio ==
| Year | Title | Role | Ref. |
|---|---|---|---|
| 2023 | For You Page | Co-presenter | |
| 2024 | Famously... In Love | Co-presenter | |
| 2025 | BBC Radio 1 Early Breakfast | Co-presenter | |
