= Andrew Norriss =

British children's author and television screenwriter

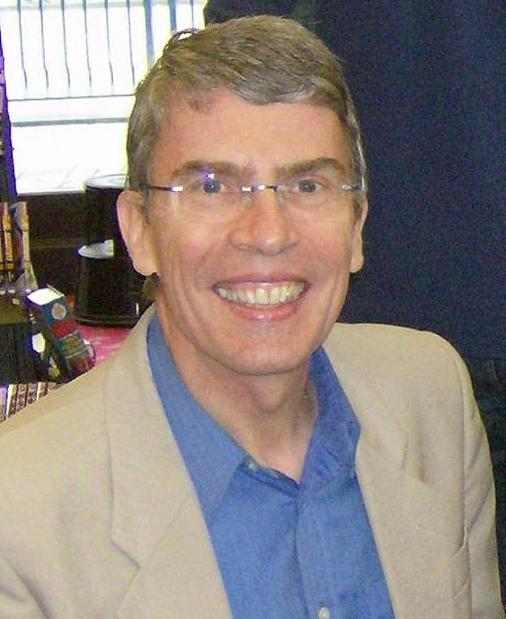
Andrew Norriss

Andrew Norriss (born 1947) is a British children's author and a writer for television.

== Background ==
Andrew Norriss was born at Dingwall in Scotland in 1947. He was educated at St John's School, Leatherhead followed by University at Trinity College Dublin (1966–1970). After teaching at Stroud School, Romsey he trained for his PGCE at University of Winchester from 1973 to 1974, then taught history at Peter Symonds College, Winchester from 1974 to 1985. Whilst teaching he started writing television sitcoms and children's comedy dramas with Richard Fegen. He now lives in Hampshire with his wife, and writes children's books.

== Writing ==
Norriss won The Whitbread (Costa) Children's Book Award (1997) for his children's book Aquila, which he wrote both as a book and as the Aquila series for the BBC. He also adapted his book Matt's Million for ITV and novelized the second to fourth series of his TV show Woof! (itself based on a book by Allan Ahlberg), the first three series of Bernard's Watch and the second series of Aquila, as well as creating and co-writing the successful sitcom The Brittas Empire.

Norriss has retired from giving talks in schools and libraries around the country for children and teachers, but is still writing. His 2015 book Jessica's Ghost is published by David Fickling Books and was shortlisted for the Costa Children's Book Award in 2016.

=== Children's books ===
- Woof! The Tale Wags On (1989)
- Woof! The Tales Gets Longer (1991)
- Woof! A Twist in the Tale (1992)
- Matt's Million (1995)
- Aquila (1997)
- Bernard's Watch (1999)
- The Touchstone (2004)
- The Unluckiest Boy in the World (2006)
- The Portal (2007)
- Ctrl-Z (2009)
- Aquila 2 (2010)
- I Don't Believe It, Archie! (2011)
- Archie's Unbelievably Freaky Week (2012)
- Jessica's Ghost (published in the United States as Friends for Life) (2015)
- Mike (2018)
- Felix Unlimited (2021)

=== Mainstream television ===
- The Brittas Empire – BBC
- The Labours of Erica – Thames/ITV
- Ffizz – Thames/ITV
- Chance in a Million – Thames/Channel 4

=== Children's television ===
- Bernard's Watch – Carlton/ITV
- Aquila – BBC
- Matt's Million – Carlton/ITV
- Woof! – Central/ITV; first series based on the novel by Allan Ahlberg
