= Joannah Tincey =

English actress

- Education: Guildford School of Acting
- Years active: 2007 to date
- Spouse: Nick Underwood

Joannah Tincey is an English actress. She attended Guildford School of Acting and later trained at RADA. In 2007, she won a Carleton Hobbs Bursary and joined the BBC's Radio Drama Company.

In 2008, she starred in Slipstream and also took part in the Sapphire and Steel audio dramas Remember Me and Wall of Darkness.

Tincey married fellow actor Nick Underwood, and in 2014 they performed a two-person version of Pride and Prejudice together, between them playing twenty-one different characters. After touring Britain, in 2016 the performance arrived at the Greenwich Theatre and then the Jermyn Street Theatre.

She is an Associate Artist of Scary Little Girls.

== Credits ==
- Witness: Five Plays from the Gospel of Luke (2007) as Martha
- Slipstream (2008) as Dr Kate Ritchie
- A Thousand Tiny Wings (2010) as Miss Lucy Watts
- Industrial Evolution (2011) as Clara Stretton
- The Elite (2011) as Stemp
