= List of Bernard's Watch episodes =

List of episodes from British children's TV series Bernard's Watch

This is the list of episodes of the British children's television drama series, Bernard's Watch. In the first run, the young Bernard was played by David Peachey.

== Original series ==
Series	Episodes	Originally released	
Series	Episodes	First released	Last released
1	5	14 November 1997	12 December 1997
2	12	2 October 1998	18 December 1998
3	13	10 September 1999	17 December 1999
4	13	15 September 2000	15 December 2000
5	10	26 November 2001	7 December 2001

=== Series 1 (1997) ===
No.	Title	Directed by	Written by	Original release date
1	"Still Time"	David Cobham	Andrew Norriss	14 November 1997
Bernard receives a watch from the postman because he is always late for everything including his friend Karen's birthday party.
2	"A Bit More Time"	David Cobham	Andrew Norriss	21 November 1997
As Bernard gets used to using his magic watch, he finds it comes in very handy at school.
3	"Time Out"	David Cobham	Andrew Norriss	28 November 1997
Bernard wants to go to the zoo, but his parents just don't have the time. Bernard, however, has all the time in the world, and decides to clear his parents' schedules a bit.
4	"Time For Everything"	David Cobham	Richard Fegen	5 December 1997
While Bernard practicing his magic tricks, he comes across a lost rabbit outside his house. He tries to reunite it with its owner and keeps it in the meantime.
5	"Giving Time"	David Cobham	Andrew Norriss	12 December 1997
Bernard's grandad comes to stay while his parents are away, Bernard is amazed at how much time his grandad has! Bernard's parents come back as his grandad slips and Bernard saves him.

=== Series 2 (1998) ===
No.	Title	Directed by	Written by	Original release date
1	"Plenty of Time"	David Cobham	Richard Fegen	2 October 1998
Karen discovers Bernard's watch, and finds out what it can do.
2	"Story Time"	David Cobham	Andrew Norriss	9 October 1998
Karen finds it very difficult to write stories at school, so she uses the watch to give herself more time to think. However she then loses the watch, and must try to find it lest time be frozen forever.
3	"Quality Time"	David Cobham	Andrew Norriss	16 October 1998
Karen has often fancied the idea of having a baby sibling. But then she has to babysit her neighbour's naughty toddler, and discovers just how much time young children can take up.
4	"Games Time"	David Cobham	Andrew Norriss	23 October 1998
Bernard has been using the watch to cheat at games and sports, but learns a lesson when he offers to help Karen win a tennis tournament.
5	"Time Travel"	David Cobham	Andrew Norriss	30 October 1998
While driving home from holiday, Bernard uses the watch to leave the moving car and get something to eat from a nearby shop. However when he accidentally unfreezes time without realising, Bernard finds himself stranded and must find a way to get home before his parents realise he's missing.
6	"Show Time"	David Cobham	Brian Finch	6 November 1998
On Bernard's birthday, Grandad performs a conjuring show for his party. However, the show looks like coming a cropper thanks to a rude party guest. Then Bernard needs Karen's help to performs a few tricks of his own, and soon the tables are turned.
7	"Time Tables"	David Cobham	Andrew Norriss	13 November 1998
Bernard gets into trouble with his music teacher when Mr Beasley accidentally drives off with Bernard's instrument. At first, Bernard is inclined to seek revenge on his teacher, but he asks Karen to help him to learning a lot about the true value of time.
8	"Gnome Time"	David Cobham	Brian Finch	20 November 1998
While on his own in the house one day, Bernard finds himself being burgled. Naturally, the magic watch proves very handy, but Bernard also has some unlikely allies on his side.
9	"Time to Spare"	David Cobham	Graham Alborough	27 November 1998
Due to a fast clock, Bernard arrives at the go-kart track a whole hour early for a friend's birthday party. His friend Dylan is also early, so they hang out in the park together, but then Dylan gets his head stuck in some railings. Bernard goes in search of help...and one thing leads to another.
10	"Swim Time"	David Cobham	Graham Alborough	6 December 1998
Karen is in trouble at the swimming pool when she loses the key to her locker trapping the watch inside. She gets out of more trouble when she blames a locker thief, with a master key, who tries to frame her.
11	"Old Time"	David Cobham	Brian Finch	11 December 1998
A nasty museum employee gets Bernard's Grandad sacked from his job. Can Bernard put things right?
12	"Space Time"	David Cobham	Brian Finch	18 December 1998
Karen makes a strange new friend one day in town, and uses the watch when her friend is in danger of missing her ship.

=== Series 3 (1999) ===
No.	Title	Directed by	Written by	Original release date
1	"Present Time"	David Cobham	Andrew Norriss	10 September 1999
It's Karen's birthday, and Bernard is trying to find just the right present to give her.
2	"Out of Time"	David Cobham	Peter Corey	17 September 1999
Bernard's Mum and Dad both have meetings to attend and have an argument about the meetings, not realising that Bernard is there, so thinking they don't care anymore Bernard looks after Karen for the Afternoon.
3	"Time and Again"	David Cobham	Andrew Norriss	24 September 1999
Bernard and his Dad go fishing which causes the magic watch to break, Bernard is very upset however the postman steps in and saves the day.
4	"Time to Go Home"	David Cobham	Richard Fegen	15 October 1999
Karen is bored when she has to stay with her Gran, but having the magic watch proves to be very useful at times like this.
5	"Time Share"	David Cobham	Richard Fegen	22 October 1999
Karen's mother happens across the watch and, unaware of its powers, is amazed at how much she can do with her time.
6	"The Time of Day"	David Cobham	Andrew Norriss	29 October 1999
Bernard is staying with Grandad during the school holiday, but Grandad accidentally hurts his foot. Fortunately, Karen has time for him and Bernard.
7	"Four Four Time"	David Cobham	Richard Fegen	5 November 1999
Karen's mother's car breaks down when Karen is going to her music exam.
8	"Tee Time"	David Cobham	Peter Corey	12 November 1999
Bernard uses his watch to help his Dad in a game of golf – but is this wise?
9	"Visiting Time"	David Cobham	Andrew Norriss	19 November 1999
Bernard's demanding cousin Lucy is staying with him, and looking after her takes all the time the watch can give. However, Lucy soon changes her ways when Bernard does a particularly good deed for her.
10	"Borrowed Time"	David Cobham	Andrew Norriss	26 November 1999
Karen is sick of her classmate Fergus always borrowing her things without asking. No one understands, so Karen uses the watch to give Fergus just the lesson he deserves.
11	"Time, Gentlemen"	David Cobham	Richard Fegen	3 December 1999
Bernard is trying to raise money for a local Pet Sanctuary, and his Grandad agrees to help by giving a darts masterclass. Unfortunately he isn't as good as he once claimed to be, Bernard is forced to intervene.
12	"Another Time"	David Cobham	Andrew Norriss	10 December 1999
Karen loves looking in other people's houses in frozen time, She especially loved looking in Mrs Sadge's house as it was very old and because she is old Karen decided to help her out and Mrs Sadge thinks Karen is an elf.
13	"Ending Time"	David Cobham	Andrew Norriss	17 December 1999
Bernard wakes up on New Year's Eve to find that his watch has been stolen by an arch-criminal Mr Rattle. Mr Rattle is mean to Bernard and his mother knocks Mr Rattle out with a vase. When he finally gets it back, the villain's deeds have made the watch stop working. Could the new millennium be the end of Bernard's watch?

=== Series 4 (2000) ===
No.	Title	Directed by	Written by	Original release date
1	"The Right Time"	David Cobham	Andrew Norriss	15 September 2000
Mr Brin the milkman has no time for anyone - until Bernard intervenes.
2	"Time Loop"	David Cobham	Andrew Norriss	22 September 2000
Bernard's cousin Lucy comes to stay and discovers Bernard's watch and gets stuck in a time loop.
3	"Wings of Time"	David Cobham	Andrew Norriss	29 September 2000
Bernard has to keep reminding Lucy on how she can't keep appearing from anywhere. Then Lucy appears in an old lady's house while shes outside then sees her puppies and realises the house is on fire what will Lucy do?
4	"Helping Time"	David Cobham	Andrew Norriss	6 October 2000
Lucy likes to use the watch to help Bernard – but her well-meaning efforts tend to backfire.
5	"Time For a Change"	David Cobham	Richard Fegen	13 October 2000
Bernard and his Grandad redecorate a neighbours wallpaper for a surprise but the neighbour doesn't like the colour.
6	"Time For an Ice Cream"	David Cobham	Richard Fegen	20 October 2000
On her way to see a superhero movie, Lucy goes in search of an ice cream. This takes awhile, however, as she ends up being a bit of a superhero herself.
7	"Time Slip"	David Cobham	Andrew Norriss	3 November 2000
Something is seriously wrong with the watch, and Bernard misses out on a very special day.
8	"Time to Remember"	David Cobham	Andrew Norriss	10 November 2000
Bernard and his Grandad look through some old war memorabilia, and Grandad tells Bernard about his ancestors who fought in the war. Bernard decides to put aside some time to remember those who went before him.
9	"Autograph Time"	David Cobham	Richard Fegen	17 November 2000
Lucy gets the chance to see her favourite boyband, Altitude. She sneaks into their room and gets them tea because they think the food is horrible. On the way back to the studio, she finds out that Abby has had an accident; that is until Lucy realises she hasn't got a ticket. Abby is played by Samantha Birch, the actress who plays Sam in the following series.
10	"Ignition Time"	David Cobham	Andrew Norriss	24 November 2000
Bernard enlists the help of Mr Singh to renovate an old go-kart.
11	"Time to Heal"	David Cobham	Andrew Norriss	1 December 2000
Lucy keep Bernard's watch while he injures himself. Could his watch give him more time to heal?
12	"Play Time"	David Cobham	Andrew Norriss	8 December 2000
Lucy is acting in the school play, but shortly before opening night, the lead actor Jeremy injures himself. The play may have to be cancelled, as no one can understudy in such a short time. That is, unless they happen to have a magic watch...
13	"Time's Up"	David Cobham	Andrew Norriss	15 December 2000
Bernard's family are off to America on holiday, when suddenly the Postman arrives to tell Bernard that he must return the watch. But why?

=== Series 5 (2001) ===
No.	Title	Directed by	Written by	Original release date
1	"Changing Times"	David Cobham	Andrew Norriss	26 November 2001
Bernard can't wait to get his watch back when he arrives back from America, but finds it needs to be repaired, and in the meantime is given an alarm clock by the Postman. Everyone is wondering why Bernard came back home.
2	"A Very Important Time"	David Cobham	Andrew Norriss	27 November 2001
After receiving an unexpected visit from the Postman, Sam accidentally messes up her future. Can she correct her mistake to put the course of time right again?
3	"Police Time"	David Cobham	Andrew Norriss	28 November 2001
Bernard's Grandad has been arrested for a series of strange crimes. Bernard uses his watch to find out what has happened, and everyone is amazed to discover who the real culprit is.
4	"Every Time"	David Cobham	Andrew Norriss	29 November 2001
Bernard uses his watch to help people with their injuries. But when his teacher Mrs. Spindell sees him with his watch, she tells him not to bring it to school because it is valuable, but when he brings it anyway. However, when she catches him with it, she sends him to the headteacher.
5	"Alien Times"	David Cobham	Andrew Norriss	30 November 2001
A group of unlikely detectives spy on Sam as she uses the watch and think she may be some form of mutant.
6	"Doing Time"	David Cobham and Alison Rashley	Andrew Norriss	3 December 2001
The Postman is distraught when his van runs away through time, as it may lead to him losing his job. Bernard soon helps to retrieve it however, in the process he has a terrifying vision of the future. Is his destiny as dark as it appears?
7	"Running on Time"	David Cobham	Andrew Norriss	4 December 2001
Bernard receives a model train but has no tracks to see it run on. He makes a friend in someone with a large model railway, Mr. Arnold. But when Mr. Arnold finds a note from his wife saying she's left him, can his knowledge of trains and Bernard's watch help save their marriage?
8	"A Worrying Time"	David Cobham	Andrew Norriss	5 December 2001
Sam tries to cure her aunt Rowena of worrying all the time by trying to get her to try high-risk activities, but she is too worried. But when Sam ends up in danger, can her aunt get over her fears to save Sam?
9	"Pool Time"	Alison Rashley	Andrew Norriss	6 December 2001
Bernard and Sam like to use a local hotel swimming pool. But one day, the hotel is in danger of being closed due to lost mice. Sam holding Bernard's hands and click the magic watch to freeze time and help them rescued the lost mice.
10	"What's Time For?"	David Cobham	Andrew Norriss	7 December 2001
The Postman needs Bernard's help to handle a mischievous young watch-holder, Harry Claymore, who keeps causing problems for everyone.

== New series ==
Series	Episodes	Originally released	
Series	Episodes	First released	Last released
1	13	6 January 2004	30 March 2004
2	13	6 January 2005	31 March 2005

=== Series 1 (2004) ===
Opening title from series 1 of the new series with Ryan Watson as Bernard

No.	Title	Directed by	Written by	Original release date
1	"Own Goal"	Dominic MacDonald	Kelly Marshall	6 January 2004
It's football time at Pentup Primary School and Bernard and his team mates are against the girls, will they win or will they lose?
2	"Father's Day"	Dominic MacDonald	Rob Jones	13 January 2004
Bernard doesn't want his dad to come to Father's Day, at school, so he changes the letter to something cool. Does it work?
3	"Owning Up"	Rachel Tillotson	David Ingham	20 January 2004
Bernard gets his best card taken off him by Ms. Savage, will things break while he retrieves it?
4	"Testing Time"	Dominic MacDonald	Rob Jones	27 January 2004
Ms Savage suspects Nathan of cheating while Mr Steel think he is a genius so they challenge Nathan along with Bernard to a quiz against Nicolette and Trish.
5	"Vote Bernard"	Rachel Tillotson	Rob Jones	3 February 2004
Bernard and Nicolette run for election and Bernard tries to stop Nicolette from cheating.
6	"First Place"	Dominic MacDonald	Laura Summers	10 February 2004
Bernard tries to use his watch to win sports day but is his family worth the risk?
7	"Deeply Dippy"	Rachel Tillotson	Rob Jones	17 February 2004
Bernard is on strikes, he sends love letters to Ms. Savage signed "Mr X" to keep her from giving him strikes, will he get into trouble?
8	"Dare You"	Dominic MacDonald	Laura Summers	24 February 2004
Nicolette has some concert tickets but daring Bernard to eat a fish, will Bernard eat the school pet?
9	"Loopy Loo"	Rachel Tillotson	Simon Nicholson	2 March 2004
The boys toilets are broken and the girls are not. Will Nathan manage to get a break to tinkle or will Nicolette stop this?
10	"Model Pupil"	Dominic MacDonald	Elly Brewer	9 March 2004
Bernard and Nathan build a model for their history project but Nicolette ruins it causing Ms Savage to threaten them with double detention.
11	"Camping Out"	Rachel Tillotson	Kristine Underdown	16 March 2004
Bernard and Nathan go head-to-head with Nicolette and Trish in a camping contest.
12	"Late Again"	Rachel Tillotson	Kelly Marshall	23 March 2004
Bernard and Nathan are late for school, not knowing it is a teacher training day when they do not have to be in.
13	"Time Out"	Dominic MacDonald	Kelly Marshall	30 March 2004
Bernard covers for Nathan so he can reunite with his estranged grandmother on a school day, can Bernard manage to keep Nathan from being expelled?

=== Series 2 (2005) ===
Opening title from series 2 of the new series. The title had been shortened to Bernard for the final series.

No.	Title	Directed by	Written by	Original release date
1	"Turning Japanese"	N.G. Bristow	Elly Brewer	6 January 2005
Bernard decides to prove to Nicolette that he is strong by breaking a stone tile and becomes popular, Nathan doesn't seem too pleased.
2	"Pupil Of The Year"	N.G. Bristow	Dave Ingham	13 January 2005
Bernard tries to help Nathan become Pupil of The Year to get two tickets to a football match. Nicolette has other ideas.
3	"The Black Knight"	N.G Bristow	Kelly Marshall	20 January 2005
It's Medieval day at Pentup Primary and Nathan (The Green Knight) is battling the mysterious Black Knight. But who could it be?
4	"Mummy's Here"	N.G. Bristow	Elly Brewer	27 January 2005
Bernard's mum has become teacher assistant for the day, as Ms. Savage faked spraining her leg. Bernard needs to convince his mum to leave. And quick!
5	"Spooked"	N.G. Bristow	Kelly Marshall	3 February 2005
The School is being kept for a sleepover to observe the stars but when a certain story which all the students think the school is haunted, will Bernard save the day?
6	"Wheels"	N.G. Bristow	Simon Nicholson	10 February 2005
Bernard doesn't have a bike and so when a competition to earn a new chopper comes up, how can he refuse?
7	"The Worm Turns"	N.G. Bristow	Elly Brewer	17 February 2005
Nathan feels he is Bernard's sidekick and decides to prove Nicolette wrong, only to find she has some other tricks up her sleeve.
8	"Vanishing Act"	N.G. Bristow	Rob Jones	24 February 2005
It's family past day and Bernard's Great Grandfather was a Pig Farmer. Bernard decides to liven things up until Nicolette manages to steal the watch and will break it, will Bernard be able to retrieve it before the whole world freezes?
9	"Learn To Earn"	N.G Bristow	Simon Nicholson	3 March 2005
Bernard wants a new skateboard and Pentup Primary decides to pay the students to clean the school. But with Nicolette stealing half the kids' money, Bernard must do something to get some new wheels.
10	"Cookie"	N.G Bristow	Rob Jones	10 March 2005
When a superstar decides to sing at the school, the janitor has too many jobs to handle. Bernard helps him out, with bad consequences as well as Mr. Steel rocking his way to love.
11	"Lost And Found"	N.G. Bristow	Kelly Marshall	17 March 2005
Something is wrong with Ms Savage. Meanwhile, Bernard discovers a dog while walking to school, could this be the cause?
12	"Party Animals"	N.G. Bristow	Dave Ingham	24 March 2005
While Nicolette is handing out party invitations, she pranks Jo. Bernard sticks up for her, and she tries to make friends with him leading Nicolette to tease him claiming Jo is his girlfriend, will Bernard be cool with it?
13	"Fire! Fire!"	N.G. Bristow	Kelly Marshall	31 March 2005
Bernard accidentally sprays Nicolette with a hose and Nicolette gets him back by locking him in a storage room and hitting the fire alarm!
