= Aquila (TV series) =

British children's television show

- Aquila's intertitle
- Genre: Children's television series
- Created by: Andrew Norriss
- Directed by: David Bell
- Starring: Ben Brooks; Craig Vye
- Country of origin: United Kingdom
- Original language: English
- No. of series: 2
- No. of episodes: 13

Production
- Running time: 20–25 minutes

Original release
- Network: BBC
- Release: 2 December 1997 – 17 December 1998

Aquila is a British children's television show adapted from the 1997 book Aquila by British author Andrew Norriss. It follows two boys, Tom Baxter and Geoff Reynolds, who find a spacecraft while digging in a field.

The programme aired on the BBC from 1997 to 1998. The first series was based on Norriss' 1997 book; the second series was novelised and published in 2010.

== Synopsis ==
While digging on farmland, friends Tom and Geoff discover a cavern containing the skeleton of a Roman centurion and a craft named Aquila. The boys learn to fly Aquila, and have to find ways to hide it, prevent doing damage with it, and communicate with it.

Tom and Geoff eventually discover the source of Aquila – a massive abandoned spaceship orbiting the Sun. They realise the significance of this, exclaiming "a battle cruiser! You could have some serious fun with a battle cruiser!".

== Episode list ==
=== Series 1 (1997) ===
| # | # | Title | Directed by | Written by | Original release date | Prod. code |
|---|---|---|---|---|---|---|
| 1 | 1 | "The Eagle Has Landed" | David Bell | Andrew Norriss | 2 December 1997 | LCNA291S |
While on holiday with their mothers, school friends Tom and Geoff fall into a cave and make a discovery that will change their lives.
| 2 | 2 | "Homeward Bound" | David Bell | Andrew Norriss | 4 December 1997 | LCNA292L |
With their holiday over, Tom and Geoff are left in the awkward position of how to get Aquila home without their parents knowing.
| 3 | 3 | "Losing Sight" | David Bell | Andrew Norriss | 9 December 1997 | LCNA293F |
Tom and Geoff test buttons, and discover the invisibility function.
| 4 | 4 | "Manual Control" | David Bell | Andrew Norriss | 11 December 1997 | LCNA294A |
Tom acquires powers after his hand becomes trapped in Aquila's dashboard.
| 5 | 5 | "Energy Levels" | David Bell | Andrew Norriss | 16 December 1997 | LCNA295T |
Tom and Geoff are uncertain what to do when Aquila begins to run out of power.
| 6 | 6 | "Comprehension Exercise" | David Bell | Andrew Norriss | 18 December 1997 | LCNA296N |
Geoff learns Aquila's origins while Tom's patience with his inquisitive neighbour reaches its limits.
| 7 | 7 | "The Eagle's Eyrie" | David Bell | Andrew Norriss | 23 December 1997 | LCNA297H |
Tom and Geoff's secret is nearly discovered, with the threat of Aquila being taken away.

=== Series 2 (1998) ===
| # | # | Title | Directed by | Written by | Original release date | Prod. code |
|---|---|---|---|---|---|---|
| 8 | 1 | "The Birthday Surprise" | David Bell | Richard Fegen & Andrew Norriss | 1 December 1998 | LCNC141T |
Geoff takes Aquila to visit his father in Paris, and Tom considers travelling to Australia in an attempt to track down his father.
| 9 | 2 | "Battling Bobby" | David Bell | Richard Fegen & Andrew Norriss | 3 December 1998 | LCNC142N |
A new boy at school picks a fight with Geoff and Tom.
| 10 | 3 | "An Elephant Surrounded by Blind Men" | David Bell | Richard Fegen & Andrew Norriss | 8 December 1998 | LCNC143H |
Geoff and Tom learn Aquila's history after discovering its black box recorder.
| 11 | 4 | "The Gooseberry" | David Bell | Richard Fegen & Andrew Norriss | 10 December 1998 | LCNC144B |
Tom is displeased when Geoff's pen friend arrives to meet him.
| 12 | 5 | "End of an Eyrie" | David Bell | Richard Fegen & Andrew Norriss | 15 December 1998 | LCNC145W |
The arrival of Dunstan, and a demolition team at Aquila's "Eyrie" storage area, leave Geoff and Tom in a difficult position as they try to find a new location to keep Aquila.
| 13 | 6 | "On Second Thoughts, Let's Panic..." | David Bell | Richard Fegen & Andrew Norriss | 17 December 1998 | LCNC146P |
Returning from a trip to Mars, Geoff and Tom read in the newspaper that they have been seen and photographed; shortly afterwards, they lose control over Aquila after landing.

== Aquila ==
Aquila is a liferaft from a larger ship, built by the Yrrillians from the planet Deneb. The ship can fly an almost infinite distance, and can fly in outer space without the need for crew spacesuits, although damage sustained to the Oxygen Regeneration system before Aquila was unearthed meant that the craft could only hold six hours of air. Other abilities of the ship include invisibility, a form of verbal remote control, lasers, a holographic interface and the Core Defence Wave Gun (capable of passing out everything in a 300 coleymort (Note: The coleymort is a Yrrillian measurement, equating to 0.637 metres (2 ft 1.1 in)) (191.1 metres; 209.0 yd) radius.

Aquila can be programmed to execute basic manoeuvres from the detection of certain signals. This feature was used when the boys program it to travel to the location of an inaudible dog whistle. The problem arose when a dog owner blew his own whistle when the craft was in invisible mode in the grounds of a stately home. This rendered the craft missing but luckily a friend of the boys, Dunstan, found it and brought it to them. He also discovers that Aquila can be connected to a computer and be contacted by email. In the case of the 2010 novelization, Aquila can also be contacted using mobile phones, as Dunstan discovers, which the boys find more convenient than using the dog whistle and it can use the phones for verbal communication since its vocal generator was destroyed millennia ago though the software remained unharmed.

Aquila has the ability to demolish objects by flying directly through them. This ability was used by the boys when they flew it through a brick wall while discovering some of Aquila's capabilities. After inspection by the boys, the craft was found completely unharmed. Aquila stores everything it sees on egg shaped objects which can be played back on the holographic screen. It records approximately 1,600 years of data. If the eggs are not replaced, then the ship starts recording over the start of the "footage". Aquila is also equipped with a lie detector that can interpret conversations in its black box footage as well as immediately outside it.

'Aquila' is the Latin translation of the word 'eagle'. Inscribed on the centurion's safety harness is Licat volare si super tergum aquila volat (lit. 'A man can fly where he will, if he rides on the back of an eagle'). This proverb was derived from an ancient Greek story, where one day, the gods decided to elect the noblest bird of all by having them race to the top of Mount Olympus. The eagle appeared to be winning, but the tiny sparrow had been resting on the eagle's back for the entire race, and at the last moment leaped up and won the race.

The name of the craft is inscribed on its own exterior as AQVILA.
