= Rebecca Mordan =

Rebecca Mordan is a British actress, writer, and activist with work featured in The Guardian and the BBC. She is also featured in the TV show Lexx.

Mordan founded Scary Little Girls in 2002 and became an official charity in 2005. Scary Little Girls is a radical feminist theatre company and production hub that works with around 100 artists a year through collaboration, partnerships, casting and mentoring.

In 2020, she was selected to be part of the BBC Writer's Room - Cornish Voices and was previously an associate artist for the Hall for Cornwall.

In 2021, Mordan was a main organizer in the 40th anniversary march to honor the activists at the Greenham Common Women's Peace Camp She later co-wrote Out of the Darkness, a book where "trailblazing women of Greenham to share their intimate recollections of the highs and lows of camp life, explore how they organised, and uncover the clever, non-violent ways they challenged military, police and cultural forces, all in the name of peace" published by The History Press
