= City Academy, London =

City Academy
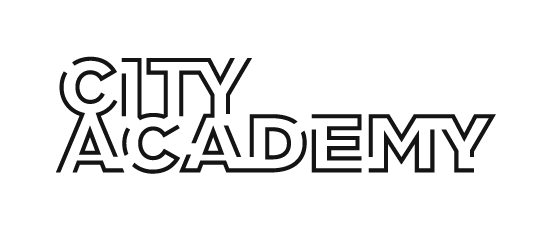

Location
- 10 Herbal Hill; Farringdon, London, EC1R 5EG; United Kingdom
- Coordinates: 51.522317°N 0.108705°W

Information
- Type: Performing & Creative Arts academy
- Established: 2006
- Managing Directors: Michael Ward & Susan Young
- Gender: Mixed
- Age: 18 to no upper age limit
- Website: https://www.city-academy.com

City Academy is an adult creative and performing arts academy, offering daytime, evening and weekend courses in dance, drama, singing, writing, filmmaking, photography, art, design, life skills, & business training in venues across Central London.

== History ==
City Academy was founded in 2006 and officially launched at the Old Prudential Building in Holborn. At the launch, filmed by Channel 4 as part of its 4Talent initiative, 200 professionals took part in a night of acting, singing and dancing.

In 2014, City Academy held over 12,000 classes for over 20,000 students, with courses taking place at over 30 different venues in central London – including Sadler's Wells, Soho Theatre, The Place, Free Word Centre, Italia Conti, Arts Theatre and the old Finsbury Town Hall. City Academy now hosts classes in around 50 central London locations.

The courses are taught by working professionals and performers from film, theatre and TV and other entertainment and creative industries.

== Notable tutors ==
- Kate Smurthwaite - stand-up comedian and political activist
- DeObia Oparei - actor and playwright, who joined the cast of HBO series Game of Thrones in April 2015 as Areo Hotah
- Giles Terera - award-winning actor, playwright and musician, and co-creator of BBC documentary - Muse of Fire - centering on modern perspectives of Shakespeare
- Racky Plews - director & choreographer of American Idiot's 2015 West End run
- Marc Price - writer, filmmaker, and creator of 2008 British zombie film Colin - "the £45 movie"
- Pele Cox - former Poet in Residence at the Tate Modern and Royal Academy

== Courses ==
City Academy offers classes in around 175 different creative disciplines, including a range of types of dance tuition, and a series of specialist creative workshops. The company has trained over 350,000 adults since its inception.

The academy also organises specialist group activities, bespoke team-building events, and corporate entertainment. Over the last three years the company's clients have included Pfizer, British Airways, McGraw Hill Financial, Regent Street Association, Expedia, Nike, University College London, Hilton Worldwide, Salesforce, Fitness First and Shell.
