= Ryan Watson (actor) =

English actor & voice actor (born 1993)

- Born: Ryan Watson; 2 February 1993 (age 33)
- Occupations: Television actor, Film actor, Voice actor
- Years active: 2003–present

Ryan Watson (born 2 February 1993) is an English actor and voice actor. He is best known for his role as the title character Bernard in the remake of Bernard's Watch from 2004 to 2005.

In 2006, he performed at the Royal National Theatre as Andrea Sarti in David Hare's adaptation of The Life of Galileo.

Watson has also voiced several characters for BBC Radio 4. He played the part of Prince Edward in the radio adaptation of Marlowe's Edward II for BBC Radio 3 in September 2009.

== Television ==
Year	Show	Episode(s)	Role
2016	Father Brown	Episode 4.8 "The Resurrectionists"	Ian Moore
2007	Christmas at the Riviera	(Various)	Edwin Hodges
2007	The Sarah Jane Adventures	2 episodes; The Lost Boy	Nathan Goss
2006	The Bill	420	Midge
2004	Bernard's Watch	(Various)	Bernard
2003	Bernard's Watch	(Various)	Bernard
2003	A Touch of Frost	Held in Trust	Bobby Palmer

== Radio ==
Year	Show	Episode(s)	Role
2010	I, Claudius	Messalina	Brittanicus
2009	Edward II	(Various)	Prince Edward

== Theatre ==
Year	Show	Theatre	Role
2006	The Life of Galileo	Royal National Theatre	Young Andrea Sarti
