= Nick Warburton =

British screenwriter and playwright (born 1947)

- Born: 1947 (age 78–79)
- Occupations: screenwriter, author, playwright
- Writing career
- Notable works: EastEnders; Doctors; Holby City

Nick Warburton (born 1947) is a British screenwriter and playwright. He has written stage plays, television and radio scripts for series including Doctors, Holby City and EastEnders.

== Career ==
Warburton was a primary-school teacher for ten years before deciding to become a full-time writer.

He has been part of the regular writing team on Holby City since 2001. His radio plays, On Mardle Fen, are one of the few recurring series on BBC Radio 4's Afternoon Play strand. His play Beast won the 2005 Tinniswood Award. Setting a Glass was shortlisted for the Tinniswood Award for a drama broadcast in 2010. Witness: Five Plays from the Gospel of Luke, an adaptation of the Gospel of St Luke, won the Sandford St Martin Trust Radio Premier award in 2009.

In 2014 Nick was awarded an Honorary Fellowship by the University of Chichester.

He also wrote a screenwriting manual, Writing for TV and Radio: A Writers' and Artists' Companion, in 2015 with Sue Teddern.
