= Peter Marinker =

Canadian actor (born 1941)

Peter Marinker (born 28 July 1941) is a Canadian actor based in London, England. He has worked extensively in theatre, radio, film, television, audiobooks and video games, and is particularly associated with the plays of Samuel Beckett. His screen credits include Labyrinth (1986), Judge Dredd (1995), Event Horizon (1997), Love Actually (2003), United 93 (2006), and Paddington in Peru (2024); he also dubbed for Sam J. Jones in Flash Gordon (1980).

In 2024 he was diagnosed with Alzheimer's disease after he felt he was "switching off" during the performances of a stage version of The Lord of the Rings where he played Gandalf. In spite of his diagnosis, he has started rehearsing for a production of Samuel Beckett's one-act show, Krapp's Last Tape where the main character will listen back to his own performance of the play in 1983.
