= List of awards and nominations received by Brenda Blethyn =

Brenda Blethyn awards and nominations
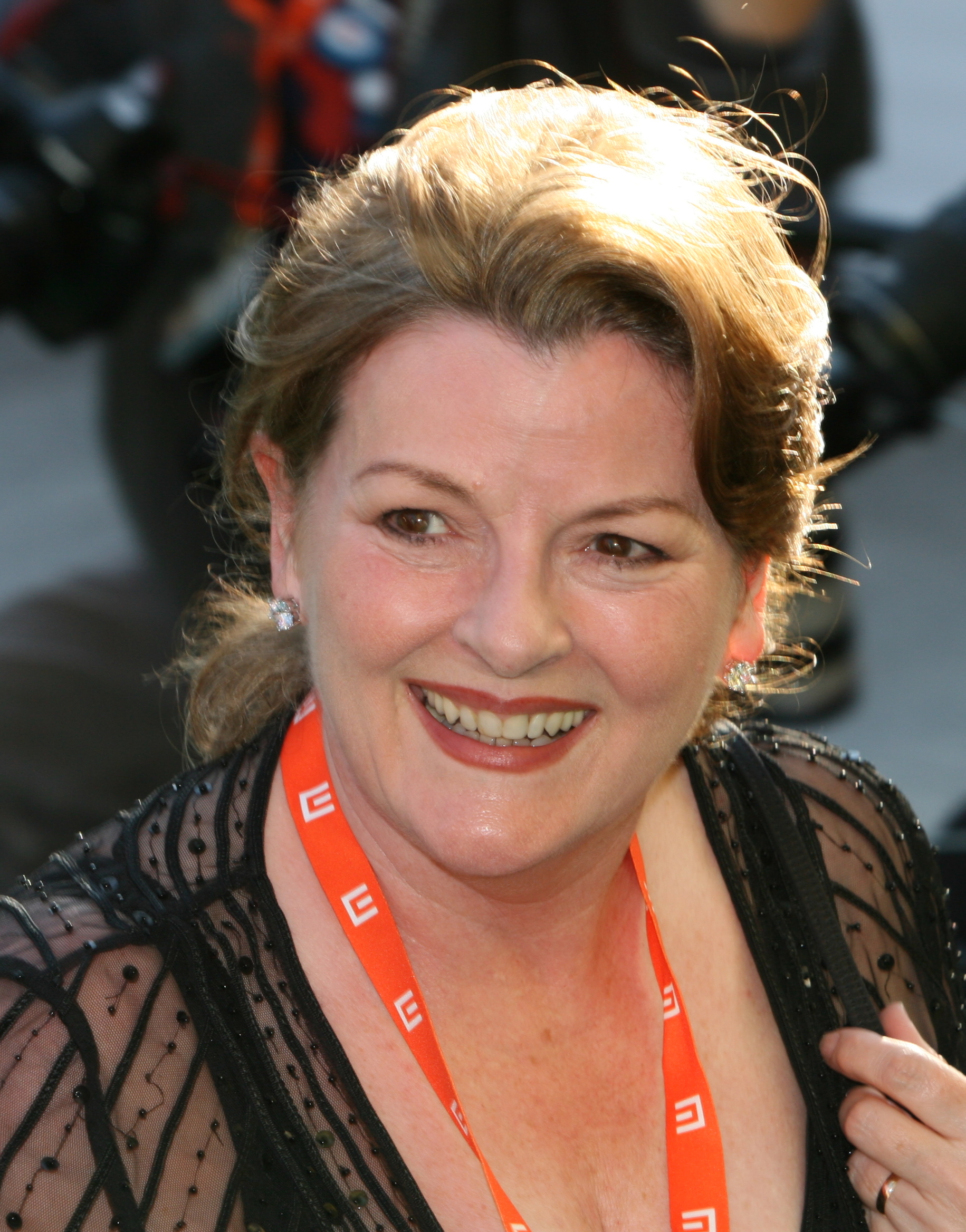
- Blethyn in 2008
Awards and nominations
| Award | Wins | Nominations |
| Academy Awards | 0 | 2 |
| BAFTA Awards | 1 | 4 |
| Golden Globe Awards | 1 | 3 |
| Laurence Olivier Awards | 0 | 1 |
| Primetime Emmy Awards | 0 | 2 |
| Screen Actors Guild Awards | 0 | 3 |

Totals (Note: Certain award groups do not simply award one winner. They acknowledge several different recipients, have runners-up, and have third place. Since this is a specific recognition and is different from losing an award, runner-up mentions are considered wins in this award tally. For simplification and to avoid errors, each award in this list has been presumed to have had a prior nomination.)
- Wins: 30
- Nominations: 38

The following is a list of awards and nominations received by British actress Brenda Blethyn. For her portrayal of Cynthia Purley in the 1996 Mike Leigh drama Secrets & Lies, Blethyn was named Best Actress at the Cannes Film Festival, as well as receiving Golden Globe and BAFTA Awards, and a nomination for that year's Academy Award for Best Actress. She received her second Oscar nomination, this time for Best Supporting Actress, for her portrayal of Mari Hoff in the 1998 comedy-drama Little Voice. Her other accolades include a Theatre World Award, an Empire Award, a London Film Critics' Circle Award, a British Comedy Award, a Royal Television Society Award, and a Rose d'Or, in addition to nominations for three further BAFTAs, two further Golden Globes, two Primetime Emmys, four Satellite Awards, three Screen Actors Guild Awards, and one Olivier Award.

== Major associations ==
=== Academy Awards ===
| Year | Nominated work | Category | Result | Ref. |
|---|---|---|---|---|
| 1997 | Secrets & Lies | Best Actress | Nominated | |
| 1999 | Little Voice | Best Supporting Actress | Nominated | |

=== British Academy Film Awards ===
| Year | Nominated work | Category | Result | Ref. |
|---|---|---|---|---|
| 1997 | Secrets & Lies | Best Actress in a Leading Role | Won | |
| 1999 | Little Voice | Best Actress in a Supporting Role | Nominated | |
| 2006 | Pride & Prejudice | Best Actress in a Supporting Role | Nominated | |

=== British Academy Television Awards ===
| Year | Nominated work | Category | Result | Ref. |
|---|---|---|---|---|
| 2005 | Belonging | Best Actress | Nominated | |

=== Golden Globe Awards ===
| Year | Nominated work | Category | Result | Ref. |
|---|---|---|---|---|
| 1997 | Secrets & Lies | Best Actress in a Motion Picture – Drama | Won | |
| 1999 | Little Voice | Best Supporting Actress – Motion Picture | Nominated | |
| 2001 | Saving Grace | Best Actress – Motion Picture Comedy or Musical | Nominated | |

=== Laurence Olivier Awards ===
| Year | Nominated work | Category | Result | Ref. |
|---|---|---|---|---|
| 1984 | Benefactors | Actress of the Year in a New Play | Nominated | |

=== Primetime Emmy Awards ===
| Year | Nominated work | Category | Result | Ref. |
|---|---|---|---|---|
| 2001 | Anne Frank: The Whole Story | Outstanding Supporting Actress in a Miniseries or Movie | Nominated | |
| 2009 | Law & Order: Special Victims Unit: Persona | Outstanding Guest Actress in a Drama Series | Nominated | |

=== Screen Actors Guild Awards ===
| Year | Nominated work | Category | Result | Ref. |
|---|---|---|---|---|
| 1997 | Secrets & Lies | Outstanding Performance by a Female Actor in a Leading Role | Nominated | |
| 1999 | Little Voice | Outstanding Performance by a Female Actor in a Supporting Role | Nominated | |
| 1999 | Little Voice | Outstanding Performance by a Cast in a Motion Picture | Nominated | |

== Critics awards ==
=== Boston Society of Film Critics ===
| Year | Nominated work | Category | Result | Ref. |
|---|---|---|---|---|
| 1996 | Secrets & Lies | Best Actress | Won | |

=== Chicago Film Critics Association ===
| Year | Nominated work | Category | Result | Ref. |
|---|---|---|---|---|
| 1996 | Secrets & Lies | Best Actress | Nominated | |

=== Florida Film Critics Circle ===
| Year | Nominated work | Category | Result | Ref. |
|---|---|---|---|---|
| 1996 | Secrets & Lies | Best Actress | Runner-up | |

=== London Film Critics' Circle ===
| Year | Nominated work | Category | Result | Ref. |
|---|---|---|---|---|
| 1996 | Secrets & Lies | British Actress of the Year | Won | |
| 2000 | Saving Grace | British Actress of the Year | Nominated | |
| 2005 | Pride & Prejudice | British Supporting Actress of the Year | Nominated | |

=== Los Angeles Film Critics Association ===
| Year | Nominated work | Category | Result | Ref. |
|---|---|---|---|---|
| 1996 | Secrets & Lies | Best Actress | Won | |

=== National Society of Film Critics ===
| Year | Nominated work | Category | Result | Ref. |
|---|---|---|---|---|
| 1996 | Secrets & Lies | Best Actress | Runner-up | |

=== Southeastern Film Critics Association ===
| Year | Nominated work | Category | Result | Ref. |
|---|---|---|---|---|
| 1996 | Secrets & Lies | Best Actress | Runner-up | |

=== Washington D.C. Area Film Critics Association ===
| Year | Nominated work | Category | Result | Ref. |
|---|---|---|---|---|
| 2005 | Pride & Prejudice | Best Supporting Actress | Runner-up | |

== Festival awards ==
=== Cannes Film Festival ===
| Year | Nominated work | Category | Result | Ref. |
|---|---|---|---|---|
| 1996 | Secrets & Lies | Best Actress | Won | |

=== Festival International de Programmes Audiovisuels ===
| Year | Nominated work | Category | Result | Ref. |
|---|---|---|---|---|
| 2005 | Belonging | Best Actress | Won | |

=== Monaco International Film Festival ===
| Year | Nominated work | Category | Result | Ref. |
|---|---|---|---|---|
| 2012 | My Angel | Best Actress | Won | |

=== Monte-Carlo Television Festival ===
| Year | Nominated work | Category | Result | Ref. |
|---|---|---|---|---|
| 2010 | London River | Best Performance by an Actress | Nominated | |

=== SESC Film Festival ===
| Year | Nominated work | Category | Result | Ref. |
|---|---|---|---|---|
| 2011 | London River | Best Foreign Actress | Won | |

== Miscellaneous awards ==
=== 20/20 Awards ===
| Year | Nominated work | Category | Result | Ref. |
|---|---|---|---|---|
| 2017 | Secrets & Lies | Best Actress | Nominated | |

=== Agatha Awards ===
| Year | Nominated work | Category | Result | Ref. |
|---|---|---|---|---|
| 2018 | Vera | Poirot Award | Won | |

=== Australian Film Institute ===
| Year | Nominated work | Category | Result | Ref. |
|---|---|---|---|---|
| 2007 | Clubland | Best Actress in a Leading Role | Nominated | |

=== Awards Circuit Community Awards ===
| Year | Nominated work | Category | Result | Ref. |
|---|---|---|---|---|
| 1996 | Secrets & Lies | Best Actress in a Leading Role | Runner-up | |

=== British Animation Awards ===
| Year | Nominated work | Category | Result | Ref. |
|---|---|---|---|---|
| 2018 | Ethel & Ernest | Best Voice Performance | Nominated | |

=== British Comedy Awards ===
| Year | Nominated work | Category | Result | Ref. |
|---|---|---|---|---|
| 1994 | Outside Edge | Best TV Comedy Actress | Won | |

=== British Independent Film Awards ===
| Year | Nominated work | Category | Result | Ref. |
|---|---|---|---|---|
| 2000 | Saving Grace | Best Performance by an Actress in a British Independent Film | Nominated | |

=== CAMIE Awards ===
| Year | Nominated work | Category | Result | Ref. |
|---|---|---|---|---|
| 2006 | Pride & Prejudice | Character and Morality in Entertainment (shared with Joe Wright and the cast) | Won | |

=== Chlotrudis Awards ===
| Year | Nominated work | Category | Result | Ref. |
|---|---|---|---|---|
| 1997 | Secrets & Lies | Best Actress | Nominated | |

=== Crime Thriller Awards ===
| Year | Nominated work | Category | Result | Ref. |
|---|---|---|---|---|
| 2012 | Vera | Best Actress | Nominated | |
| 2014 | Vera | Best Actress | Nominated | |

=== DVD Exclusive Awards ===
| Year | Nominated work | Category | Result | Ref. |
|---|---|---|---|---|
| 2003 | The Sleeping Dictionary | Best Supporting Actress in a DVD Premiere Movie | Won | |

=== Empire Awards ===
| Year | Nominated work | Category | Result | Ref. |
|---|---|---|---|---|
| 1997 | Secrets & Lies | Best British Actress | Won | |
| 2001 | Saving Grace | Best British Actress | Nominated | |

=== Entertainment Daily Awards ===
| Year | Nominated work | Category | Result | Ref. |
|---|---|---|---|---|
| 2022 | Vera | Best Detective Duo (shared with Kenny Doughty) | Won | |

=== Evening Standard British Film Awards ===
| Year | Nominated work | Category | Result | Ref. |
|---|---|---|---|---|
| 2012 | London River | Best Actress | Nominated | |

=== Indie Shorts Awards Cannes ===
| Year | Nominated work | Category | Result | Ref. |
|---|---|---|---|---|
| 2021 | Strawberry Fields Forever | Best Actress | Won | |

=== Inside Film Awards ===
| Year | Nominated work | Category | Result | Ref. |
|---|---|---|---|---|
| 2007 | Clubland | Best Actress | Nominated | |

=== New York Indie Shorts Awards ===
| Year | Nominated work | Category | Result | Ref. |
|---|---|---|---|---|
| 2021 | Strawberry Fields Forever | Best Actress | Won | |

=== Online Film & Television Association ===
| Year | Nominated work | Category | Result | Ref. |
|---|---|---|---|---|
| 1996 | Secrets & Lies | Best Actress | Nominated | |
| 1996 | Secrets & Lies | Best Drama Actress | Won | |
| 2000 | RKO 281 | Best Supporting Actress in a Television Picture or Miniseries | Nominated | |
| 2001 | Anne Frank: The Whole Story | Best Supporting Actress in a Television Picture or Miniseries | Won | |
| 2008 | Law & Order: Special Victims Unit | Best Guest Actress in a Drama Series | Nominated | |

=== Royal Television Society ===
| Year | Nominated work | Category | Result | Ref. |
|---|---|---|---|---|
| 2017 | Vera | Performance of the Year | Won | |

=== Sant Jordi Awards ===
| Year | Nominated work | Category | Result | Ref. |
|---|---|---|---|---|
| 1997 | Secrets & Lies | Best Foreign Actress | Won | |

=== Satellite Awards ===
| Year | Nominated work | Category | Result | Ref. |
|---|---|---|---|---|
| 1996 | Secrets & Lies | Best Actress – Motion Picture | Nominated | |
| 1999 | Little Voice | Best Supporting Actress – Motion Picture | Nominated | |
| 2001 | Saving Grace | Best Actress – Motion Picture | Nominated | |
| 2002 | Anne Frank: The Whole Story | Best Supporting Actress – Series, Miniseries or Television Film | Nominated | |

=== Theatre World Awards ===
| Year | Nominated work | Category | Result | Ref. |
|---|---|---|---|---|
| 1991 | Absent Friends | Theatre World Award | Won | |

=== TV Choice Awards ===
| Year | Nominated work | Category | Result | Ref. |
|---|---|---|---|---|
| 2018 | Vera | Best Actress | Nominated | |
| 2024 | Vera | Best Actress | Nominated | |

== Honours ==
=== Alliance of Women Film Journalists ===
| Year | Nominee | Category | Result | Ref. |
|---|---|---|---|---|
| 2007 | Brenda Blethyn | Actress Defying Age and Ageism | Nominated | |

=== Capri Hollywood International Film Festival ===
| Year | Nominee | Category | Result | Ref. |
|---|---|---|---|---|
| 2014 | Brenda Blethyn | Lifetime Achievement Award | Won | |

=== Order of the British Empire ===
| Year | Nominee | Category | Result | Ref. |
|---|---|---|---|---|
| 2003 | Brenda Blethyn | Officer of the Most Excellent Order of the British Empire (OBE) | Won | |

=== Rose d'Or ===
| Year | Nominee | Category | Result | Ref. |
|---|---|---|---|---|
| 2021 | Brenda Blethyn | Lifetime Achievement Award | Won | |
