= Matrilocal residence =

Societal system of married couples residing with the wife's parents

In social anthropology, matrilocal residence or matrilocality (also uxorilocal residence or uxorilocality) is the societal system in which a married couple resides with or near the wife's parents.

== Description ==
Frequently, visiting marriage is being practiced, meaning that husband and wife are living apart, in their separate birth families, and seeing each other in their spare time. The children of such marriages are raised by the mother's extended matrilineal clan. The father does not have to be involved in the upbringing of his own children; he is, however, in that of his sisters' children (his nieces and nephews). In direct consequence, property is inherited from generation to generation, and, overall, remains largely undivided.

Matrilocal residence is found most often in horticultural societies.

Examples of matrilocal societies include the people of Ngazidja in the Comoros, the Ancestral Puebloans of Chaco Canyon, the Nair community in Kerala in South India, the Moso of Yunnan and Sichuan in southwestern China, the Siraya of Taiwan, and the Minangkabau of western Sumatra. Among indigenous people of the Amazon basin this residence pattern is often associated with the customary practice of bride service, as seen among the Urarina of northeastern Peru.

During the Song Dynasty in medieval China, matrilocal marriage became common for wealthy non-aristocratic families.

In other regions of the world, such as Japan, during the Heian period, a marriage of this type was not a sign of high status, but rather an indication of the patriarchal authority of the woman's family (her father or grandfather), who was sufficiently powerful to demand it.

Another matrilocal society is the !Kung San of Southern Africa. They practice uxorilocality for the bride service period, which lasts until the couple has produced three children or they have been together for more than ten years. At the end of the bride service period, the couple has a choice of which clan they want to live with. (Technically, uxorilocality differs from matrilocality; uxorilocality means the couple settles with the wife's family, while matrilocality means the couple settles with the wife's lineage. Because the !Kung do not live in lineages, they cannot be matrilocal; they are uxorilocal.)

Early theories explaining the determinants of postmarital residence (by, for example, Lewis Henry Morgan, Edward Tylor, and George Peter Murdock) connected it with the sexual division of labor. However, for many years cross-cultural tests of this hypothesis using worldwide samples failed to find any significant relationship between these two variables. On the other hand, Korotayev's tests have shown that the female contribution to subsistence does correlate significantly with matrilocal residence in general; however, this correlation is masked by a general polygyny factor. Although an increase in the female contribution to subsistence tends to lead to matrilocal residence, it also tends simultaneously to lead to general non-sororal polygyny which effectively destroys matrilocality. If this polygyny factor is controlled (e.g., through a multiple regression model), division of labor turns out to be a significant predictor of postmarital residence. Thus, Murdock's hypotheses regarding the relationships between the sexual division of labor and postmarital residence were basically correct, though, as has been shown by Korotayev, the actual relationships between those two groups of variables are more complicated than he expected.

Matrilocality in the Arikari culture in the 17th–18th centuries was studied anew within feminist archaeology by Christi Mitchell, in a critique of a previous study, the critique challenging whether men were virtually the sole agents of societal change while women were only passive.

According to Barbara Epstein, anthropologists in the 20th century criticized feminist promatriarchal views and said that "the goddess worship or matrilocality that evidently existed in many paleolithic societies was not necessarily associated with matriarchy in the sense of women's power over men. Many societies can be found that exhibit those qualities along with female subordination. Furthermore, militarism, destruction of the natural environment, and hierarchical social structures can be found in societies in which goddess worship, matrilocality, or matriliny exist." (Note: Paleolithic Age: prehistoric period marked by the development of the most primitive stone tools) (Note: Militarism: a belief in a strong military and its aggressive use) (Note: Matriliny: a system based on maternal descent)

In sociobiology, matrilocality refers to animal societies in which a pair bond is formed between animals born or hatched in different areas or different social groups, and the pair becomes resident in the female's home area or group.

In present-day mainland China, matrilocal residence has been encouraged by the government.

== List of matrilocal societies ==
- Taotao Tåno (Chamoru/Chamorro)
- Bajuni people
- Bribri
- Filipinos (both matrilocal and patrilocal)
- Garo
- Hopi
- Iban (both matrilocal and patrilocal)
- Iroquois
- Jaintia
- Karen
- Kerinci
- Khasi
- Marshallese
- Minangkabau
- Mosuo (separate residence; each lives in mother's household)
- Nair people of Kerala
- Pueblos, among whom "matrilineality ... seemed to be associated with matrilocality"
- Siraya
- Tlingit
- Vanatinai
- Sinixt

== See also ==
- Matrifocal family
- Neolocal residence
- Patrilocal residence
- Yobai
- Night hunting

== Bibliography ==
- Ember, Melvin; Ember, Carol R. (1971). "The Conditions Favoring Matrilocal Versus Patrilocal Residence". American Anthropologist. 73 (3): 571–594. doi:10.1525/aa.1971.73.3.02a00040. JSTOR 671756.
- Fox, Robin (1967). Kinship and Marriage: An anthropological perspective. New York: Cambridge University Press. ISBN 978-0-521-27823-2.
- Jordan, Fiona M.; Gray, Russell D.; Greenhill, Simon J.; Mace, Ruth (4 March 2009). "Matrilocal residence is ancestral in Austronesian societies". Proceedings of the Royal Society B: Biological Sciences. 276 (1664): 1957–64. doi:10.1098/rspb.2009.0088. PMC 2677244. PMID 19324748.
- Korotayev, Andrey (2001). "An Apologia of George Peter Murdock. Division of Labor by Gender and Postmarital Residence in Cross-Cultural Perspective: A Reconsideration" (PDF). World Cultures. 12 (2): 179–203. Archived from the original (PDF) on 2009-03-06.
- Peregrine, Peter N. (January 2001). "Matrilocality, Corporate Strategy, and the Organization of Production in the Chacoan World" (PDF). American Antiquity. 66 (1): 36–46. doi:10.2307/2694316. JSTOR 2694316. S2CID 39714211.
- Shepherd, John Robert (1995). Marriage and mandatory abortion among the 17th-century Siraya. American Anthropological Association. ISBN 9780913167717.
- Shih, Chuan-kang (2010). Quest for Harmony: The Moso Traditions of Sexual Union and Family Life. Stanford University Press. ISBN 9780804773447.
