= London Film Critics' Circle Award for British Supporting Actor of the Year =

Former British film award

The London Film Critics Circle Award for British Supporting Actor of the Year was an annual award given by the London Film Critics' Circle.

== Winners ==
=== 1990s ===
Year	Winner	Film	Role
1997	Rupert Everett	My Best Friend's Wedding	George Downes
1998	Nigel Hawthorne	The Object of My Affection	Rodney Fraser
1999	Michael Caine	Little Voice	Ray Say

=== 2000s ===
Year	Winner	Film	Role
2000	Albert Finney	Erin Brockovich	Edward L. Masry
2001	Paul Bettany	A Knight's Tale	Geoffrey Chaucer
2002	Kenneth Branagh	Harry Potter and the Chamber of Secrets	Gilderoy Lockhart
2003	Bill Nighy	Love Actually	Billy Mack
2004	Phil Davis	Vera Drake	Stanley Drake
2005	Tom Hollander	Pride & Prejudice	Mr William Collins
2006	Michael Caine	The Prestige	John Cutter
2007	Tom Wilkinson	Michael Clayton	Arthur Edens
2008	Eddie Marsan	Happy-Go-Lucky	Scott
2009	Michael Fassbender	Fish Tank	Connor O'Reily

=== 2010s ===
Year	Winner	Film	Role
2010	Andrew Garfield	The Social Network	Eduardo Saverin
