= Iban wedding =

Ceremony practised by the Iban people during a wedding

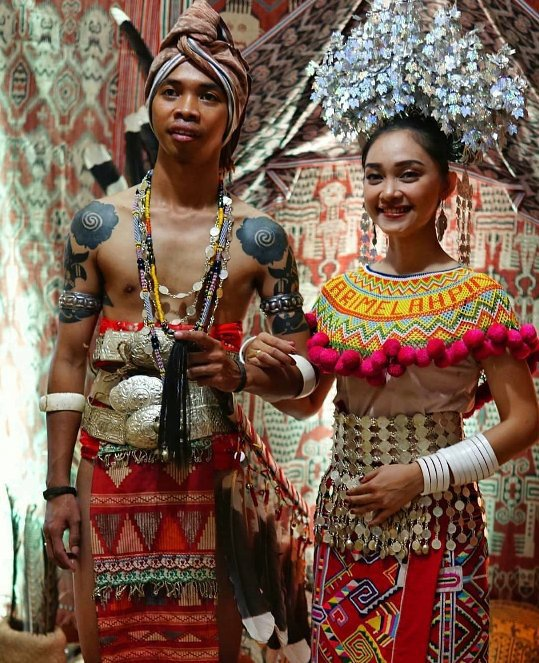
Iban wedding in Kapuas Hulu, West Kalimantan, Indonesia.

Iban wedding refers to ceremony practised by the Iban people particularly in Sarawak (Malaysia), West Kalimantan (Indonesia) and also part of Brunei during a wedding. Modern day Iban wedding might also incoporates custom from religions like Christianity and Islam.

== Before wedding ==
=== Ngayap ===
Traditionally, a couple is met by a courting practise called ngayap. This custom involves nocturnal visits by young men to the residences of unmarried women at night with the intent of initiating romantic relationships. In the modern times, the practice of Ngayap is no longer practised. This is due to the fact that courtship could be developed during gatherings such as festivals, schools, institutions of higher learning, and workplaces. As the practice is susceptible to misinterpretation or misuse, it is generally confined to the cultural domain of the Iban community.

== Pre-wedding custom ==
To propose a woman, the future groom and his family will present a ring to the woman's family. Through this act, the man formalizes the engagement, establishing a bond with his future bride that is set to last for three months. On the day, the parents of the prospective bride and groom will consult with one another to discuss the marriage of their children.

=== Nguai ===
Before starting a wedding, the partner usually discuss about arragement according to nguai custom. Nguai is a custom that dictates their permanent residence after being married, in which one of the spouse has to join the community of the longhouse which their partner comes from. When a couple comes from different longhouses, they must agree on their permanent place of residence, known as penyangkai, which literally means a port or landing place. Couples from the same longhouse must similarly decide which family or household they will reside with permanently.

In modern days, this custom is rarely practised since it is thought to be inconsequential to modern Iban society, since most of the people live away from their respective longhouses.

== During wedding ==
An Iban marriage is solemnised through a public announcement in the presence of a Tuai Rumah (longhouse headman), relatives of the couple and members of the longhouse community. There are three customary procedures for solemnising an Iban marriage: Melah Pinang, Bebiau and Beterang. Melah Pinang involves splitting an areca nut to mark the completion of the marriage formalities and establish a date for the couple to revisit the bride's longhouse.

The melah pinang ceremony begins with the groom, wearing traditional Iban clothing, brought in a line by car or jong to the bride's house, accompanied by the beating of gong. Their presence was signaled by gunfire as a signal. The brides join the groom’s party by the river for a bath together, which symbolizes the beginning of the relationship between the two families.

Then a talk in the ruai (communal hall) accompanied by drinking tuak (rice wine). The bride asks for berian (gift) according to the custom of the village. Usually, these gifts includes, pemechah tangga which consisting of an adze or axe, pemuka pintu which includes a spear, pemuka kelambu, represented by a sword and also other gifts which are suitable.

After that, the ceremony is proceeded with Bebiau, which is a ceremony in which incantations are recited and a cockerel is waved over the couple to seek spiritual blessings and protection, accompanied by public reminders of their obligations under adat. The bebiau ceremony will be held at night and witnessed by both parents and relatives as well as the inhabitants of the longhouse. The bride and groom will wear traditional clothes and are allowed to sit between the gongs that have been covered with pua kumbu cloth.

In contrast, Beterang is a simpler procedure involving a public announcement of the marriage by a person appointed by the families, with or without the presence of a Tuai Rumah and without spiritual rituals. It was a common form of marriage solemnisation in the past and remains in use today.
