= Clive Merrison =

British actor of film, television, stage and radio (born 1945)

- Born: 15 September 1945 (age 81); Tenby, Wales
- Education: Rose Bruford College
- Occupation: Actor
- Known for: Doctor Who; Sherlock Holmes; The Further Adventures of Sherlock Holmes; The History Boys
- Spouse(s): Stephanie Tremethick (m. 1967) Gillian Barge (m. 2003; died 2003)

Clive Merrison (born 15 September 1945) is a Welsh actor of film, television, stage and radio. He is best known for his long running BBC Radio portrayal of Sherlock Holmes, having played the part in all 64 episodes of the 1989–1998 series of Sherlock Holmes dramatisations, and all 16 episodes of The Further Adventures of Sherlock Holmes (2002–2010). He also appeared in the original West End and Broadway productions of Alan Bennett's The History Boys, as well as the 2006 film.

== Early life ==
Merrison trained at Rose Bruford College.

== Television ==
Merrison has made numerous television appearances. He appeared as Boris Savinkov the White Russian commander in the series Reilly: Ace of Spies (1983) starring Sam Neill as Reilly. He has twice appeared in supporting roles in Doctor Who, in The Tomb of the Cybermen (1967) and Paradise Towers (1987). He has also appeared in Crown Court (TV series) (15 episodes 1976–78 in which he played barrister Charles Banham), Yes, Prime Minister, Kit Curran, The Labours of Erica, Bergerac, Mann's Best Friends, Double First, Drop the Dead Donkey, Time Riders, Pie in the Sky, The Tomorrow People, Mortimer's Law, The Bill, Believe Nothing, Midsomer Murders (twice), Foyle's War, Lewis and The Brief. He played Bob Cratchit in a 1977 BBC adaptation of A Christmas Carol (opposite Michael Hordern as Ebenezer Scrooge), Mark Corrigan's father in the 2010 Peep Show Christmas special, and Clement Attlee in the 2012 TV movie Bert and Dickie. He has also done voice work as a guest appearance in the children's animated series Testament: The Bible in Animation and Shakespeare: The Animated Tales.

== Stage ==
Merrison was a member of Laurence Olivier's National Theatre Company in the 1970s and the Royal Shakespeare Company, at the Royal Shakespeare Theatre in Stratford-on-Avon.

Merrison portrayed Antonin Artaud in the Rome and London premieres of Charles Marowitz's play, Artaud at Rodez. He also portrayed the headmaster in the original National Theatre and Broadway productions of Alan Bennett's hit play, The History Boys which went on to win 6 Tony Awards and an Oliver for Best New Play. He reprised the role for the film version.

== Film ==
Merrison played the onscreen father of Kate Winslet in the 1994 film Heavenly Creatures, directed by Peter Jackson, and the traditionalist headmaster in Alan Bennett's The History Boys, filmed in 2006. He was the forger in the 1981 film Escape to Victory and also played Bartholomew Sholto in The Sign of Four (1983), Desmond Fairchild in An Awfully Big Adventure (1995) and the lawyer in Saving Grace (2000). His other film credits included roles in Henry VIII and His Six Wives (1972), Riddles of the Sphinx (1977), Coming Out of the Ice (1982), the Clint Eastwood film Firefox (1982), The English Patient (1996), True Blue (1996), Photographing Fairies (1997), Janice Beard (1999) and Pandaemonium (2000).

== Sherlock Holmes on radio ==
From 5 November 1989 to 5 July 1998, Merrison played the lead role of Sherlock Holmes on radio in a series of BBC Radio 4 dramatisations, with Michael Williams as Dr. Watson. Later, with Andrew Sachs as Watson, Merrison continued to play Holmes in the Bert Coules-scripted pastiche series The Further Adventures of Sherlock Holmes, the first series of which was broadcast in 2002, the second in 2004, the third in 2008-9 and the fourth in 2010. He is the first actor to have played Holmes in adaptations of every short story and novel by Arthur Conan Doyle about the character.

== Other radio appearances ==
Merrison has also appeared in other BBC radio series and plays, including Jim Nicholson - Return to the Islands by Robert Barr (1971), Groosham Grange; Burn the Aeneid! by Martyn Wade; One Winter's Afternoon; Sunday at Sant' Agata (in which he played Giuseppe Verdi); the 2003 adaptation of John Wyndham's The Midwich Cuckoos, in which he played Prof. Gordon Zellaby; Mr. Standfast; the 2011 adaptation of A Tale of Two Cities (in which he played the Marquis St. Evremonde); the 2006 radio adaptation of The History Boys (in which he played "The Headmaster", a role he repeated on film); and Strangers and Brothers.

== Personal life ==
In 1967 Merrison lived at 45 Arlington Road in West Ealing. Also in 1967 he married Stephanie Tremethick.

In the 1990s Merrison lived in Suffolk. He married Gillian Barge in 2003, who died in the same year.

== Selected filmography ==
- 1972 Henry VIII and His Six Wives as Weston
- 1977 Riddles of the Sphinx as Chris
- 1981 Escape to Victory as The Forger – The English
- 1981 Mark Gertler: Fragments of a Biography as Futurist
- 1982 Coming Out of the Ice as Bikov
- 1982 Firefox as Major Lanyev
- 1983 The Sign of Four as Bartholomew Sholto
- 1983 Reilly, Ace of Spies as Boris Savinkov
- 1986 Yes, Prime Minister as Dr. Peter Thorn
- 1992 Rebecca's Daughters as Sir Henry
- 1994 Heavenly Creatures as Dr. Henry Hulme
- 1995 An Awfully Big Adventure as Desmond Fairchild
- 1996 The English Patient as Fenelon-Barnes
- 1996 True Blue as Jack Garnet
- 1997 Photographing Fairies as Gardner
- 1999 Janice Beard as Tobo
- 2000 Saving Grace as Quentin
- 2000 Up at the Villa as Archibald Grey
- 2000 Pandaemonium as Dr. Gillman
- 2001 The Discovery of Heaven as Theo Kern
- 2006 The History Boys as The Headmaster
- 2012 Bert and Dickie as Clement Attlee
- 2015 The Lady in the Van as Man In Confessional
- 2018 The Guernsey Literary and Potato Peel Pie Society as Mr. Gilbert
