= Dragonfly (2025 film) =

2025 British drama film

- Official poster
- Directed by: Paul Andrew Williams
- Screenplay by: Paul Andrew Williams
- Produced by: Marie-Elena Dyche; Dominic Tighe
- Starring: Andrea Riseborough; Brenda Blethyn; Jason Watkins
- Cinematography: Vanessa Whyte
- Edited by: Nina Annan
- Music by: Raffertie
- Production companies: Giant Productions; Meraki Films
- Distributed by: Conic Films
- Release date: June 2025 (Tribeca)
- Running time: 98 minutes
- Country: United Kingdom
- Language: English

Dragonfly is a 2025 British drama film written and directed by Paul Andrew Williams and starring Andrea Riseborough and Brenda Blethyn with Jason Watkins.

== Plot ==
Elsie Richards is an elderly widow who lives alone in a semi-detached bungalow. She has limited mobility and an arthritic wrist, and receives regular visits from a care agency to wash her and help tend to her home.

When an agency worker cuts her allotted hour short, Elsie is visited by her thirty-five-year-old neighbour Colleen. She begins handling shopping runs for Elsie and assists with errands around the house, and the two strike up a friendship. When Elsie snaps at a worker in the shower, Colleen volunteers to care for her instead. Lonely and bereft of consistent visits from her family, Elsie accepts.

Throughout their time together, Elsie learns that Colleen was abandoned by her mother at the age of eight and spent the rest of her youth in the care system. She relies on state benefits and lives with her loud but gentle bull-breed dog, Saber. Elsie's son, John, learns of the arrangement with Colleen and expresses his disapproval to his mother over the phone.

John makes a visit to Elsie's house and meets Colleen. Their introduction is strained, with John asking her pointed questions about her personal life, though he nonetheless expresses gratitude to her for looking after Elsie. Following his departure, the police arrive at Colleen's house to detain Saber. An enraged Colleen tries to intervene and is arrested.

When she is released, Colleen tells Elsie that Saber has been put down. She ceases her visits and ignores any attempts at contact from Elsie. John confides in his mother over the phone that he reported Saber as a dangerous dog to the police, to her horror. Unbeknownst to them, Colleen overhears the conversation from outside the house.

The next morning, Elsie discovers a waste bin emptied all over her garden, and she awakens at night to find Colleen sitting on the end of her bed. Colleen states that what happened to Saber will not affect their friendship, and she leaves. John calls the police, though they do not find Colleen at her home.

Another night, Elsie receives a call from her son's wife, saying that John left to visit her again but has fallen out of contact. Elsie enters her kitchen to find Colleen there, dazed and covered in bloodstains. Elsie receives a second call from John's wife, revealing that the police have found his body. Colleen cuts her wrist and bleeds to death at the kitchen table. Terrified, Elsie slips in the resulting pool of blood and breaks her leg.

Some time later, Elsie's injured leg is placed in a cast and she is moved from her home to an assisted-living facility. An employee offering refreshments to residents walks by Elsie, who stares silently ahead.

== Cast ==
- Andrea Riseborough as Colleen
- Brenda Blethyn as Elsie
- Jason Watkins as John

== Production ==
The film is written and directed by Paul Andrew Williams, who wrote the script during the Covid-19 pandemic. The film was designed to be shot under pandemic restrictions, but principal photography did not take place until after the pandemic restrictions had ended. The film was shot in several locations in two Yorkshire towns called Knottingley and Castleford. The character of Elsie contains characteristics close to his own mother and maternal grandmother. Actress Andrea Riseborough had a high degree of creative input into the costume of her character Colleen. The drama stars Brenda Blethyn as Elsie, with Jason Watkins cast as her son.

The film is produced by Giant Productions and Meraki Films with Marie-Elena Dyche and Dominic Tighe as producers.

== Release ==
The film had its world premiere at the Tribeca Festival in June 2025 ahead of its British premiere at the Edinburgh Film Festival in August 2025.

== Reception ==
=== Critical response ===
On the review aggregator website Rotten Tomatoes, Dragonfly holds an approval rating of 92% from 25 reviews.

Peter Bradshaw in The Guardian described the film as "stark, fierce, wonderfully acted", and "riveting" with "elements of Mike Leigh but also moments of thriller and even horror".

=== Accolades ===
At the Tribeca Festival in New York, Blethyn and Riseborough received a joint performance award in June 2025. The following month, it won the international feature award at the Galway Film Fleadh in Ireland. Riseborough and Blethyn were nominated for best joint lead performance at the British Independent Film Awards 2025. Dixie who plays Colleen's dog, Sabre, was awarded Femme Fido and Best in World at the Fido Awards 2026. The film's composer Raffertie was nominated for Best Original Film Score at the 71st Ivor Novello Awards.
