= Night Train (1998 film) =

- film poster
- Directed by: John Lynch
- Written by: Aodhan Madden
- Produced by: Tristan Lynch
- Starring: John Hurt; Brenda Blethyn
- Cinematography: Seamus Deasy
- Edited by: J. Patrick Duffner
- Music by: Adam Lynch
- Distributed by: Filmopolis Pictures
- Release date: 28 August 1998
- Running time: 92 min.
- Country: Ireland
- Language: English
- Budget: $4.5 million

Night Train is a 1998 Irish romantic thriller directed by John Lynch (as his debut feature), starring John Hurt and Brenda Blethyn, released in the United Kingdom on 28 August 1998. Lynch was nominated for a Crystal Star for the film at the Brussels International Film Festival, and Hurt won the Best Actor award at the Verona Love Screens Film Festival for his performance.

== Plot ==
The film follows Michael Poole (Hurt), an ex-prisoner with a passion for electric trains and the Orient Express. In his attempts at starting a new life, he finds refuge in the house of Mrs. Mooney, a possessive old lady (Pauline Flanagan). Things begin to get complicated when he falls for the lady's daughter (Brenda Blethyn), and he faces the ultimate question of catching the night train or taking charge of his life like an adult.

== Cast ==
- John Hurt — Michael Poole
- Brenda Blethyn — Alice Mooney
- Pauline Flanagan — Mrs. Mooney
- Rynagh O'Grady — Winnie
- Peter Caffrey — Walter
- Paul Roe — Blake
- Lorcan Cranitch — Billy
- Cathy White — Liz
- Kevin McHugh — Detective Cassidy
- Aaron Harris — Sgt. Charlie

== Reception ==
Variety's Glenn Lovell wrote that while the film was a "good-hearted" mix of romance and reflection, the film "eventually jumps the tracks, derailed by jarring tone shifts and homestretch absurdities."
