= The Labours of Erica =

- Written by: Richard Fegen; Andrew Norriss
- Starring: Brenda Blethyn; Clive Merrison; Geoffrey Davies
- Country of origin: United Kingdom
- Original language: English
- No. of series: 2
- No. of episodes: 12

Production
- Running time: 30 minutes
- Production company: Thames Television

Original release
- Network: ITV
- Release: 13 March 1989 – 9 April 1990

The Labours of Erica is a British television sitcom starring Brenda Blethyn as self-made businesswoman Erica Parsons. The show was first broadcast between 13 March 1989 and 9 April 1990.

== Premise ==
Businesswoman Erica Parsons finds a list she had made as a young girl of everything she wanted to do before turning 18. Realising she has never done any of them, she resolves to achieve all her aims before her 40th birthday instead. The series premiered on ITV in the United Kingdom at 8:00pm on Monday 13 March 1989 and ran for two series until 9 April 1990.

== DVD release ==
The complete series of The Labours of Erica was released on DVD in the United Kingdom on 2 August 2010.
