= Brenda Blethyn =

British actress (born 1946)

Brenda Blethyn OBE
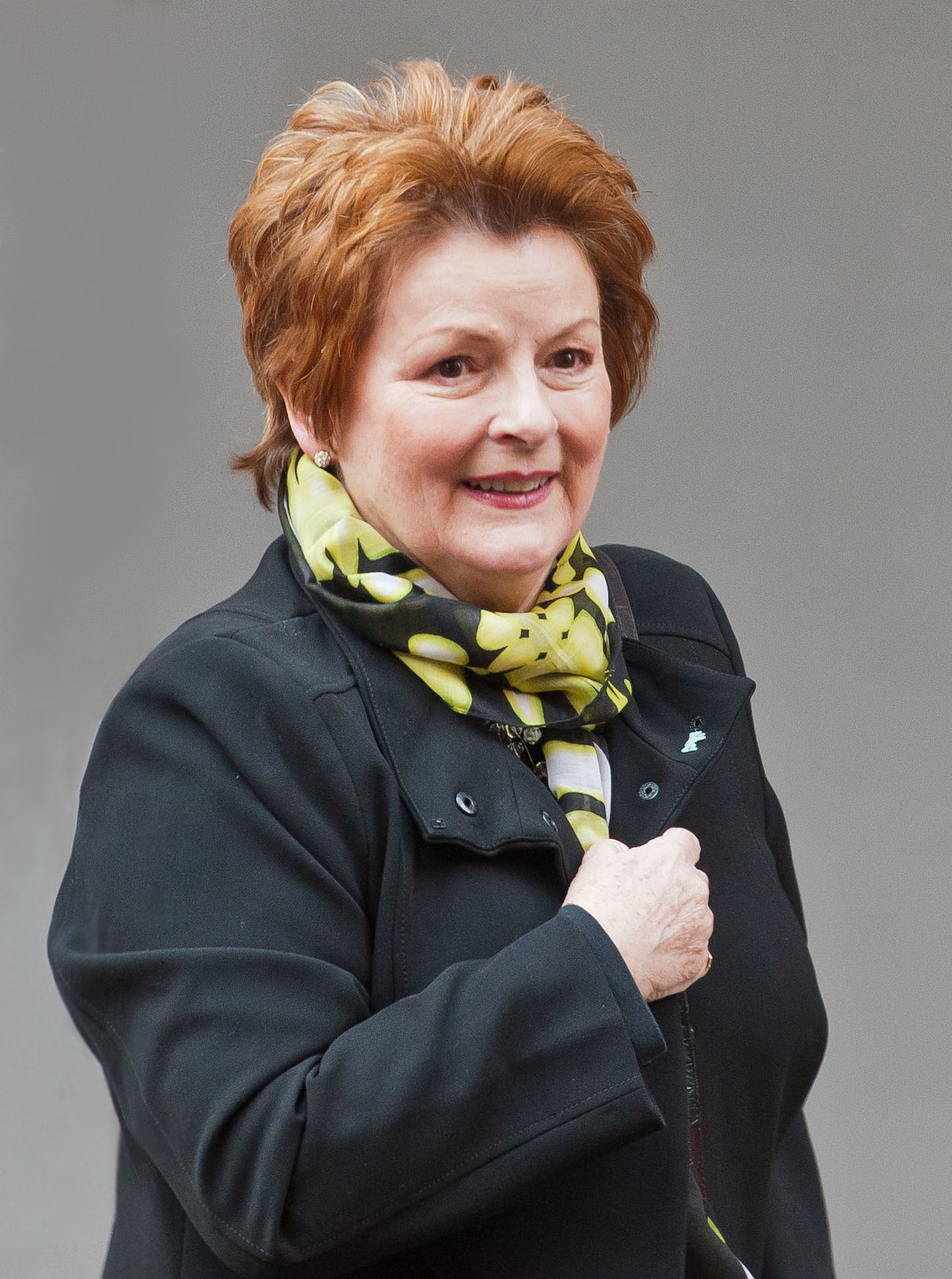
- Blethyn in 2014
- Born: Brenda Bottle; 20 February 1946 (age 80); Ramsgate, Kent, England
- Education: Guildford School of Acting
- Occupation: Actress
- Years active: 1976–present
- Known for: Vera; Secrets and Lies
- Spouses: Alan Blethyn (m. 1964; div. 1973) Michael Mayhew (m. 2010)
- Awards: Full list

Brenda Blethyn (née Bottle; born 20 February 1946) is an English actress. Known for her character work and versatility, she is the recipient of various accolades, including a Golden Globe Award, a British Academy Film Award, and a Cannes Film Festival Award for Best Actress, as well as nominations for two Academy Awards and two Primetime Emmy Awards. She was appointed Officer of the Order of the British Empire (OBE) for services to drama in 2003.

Blethyn pursued an administrative career before enrolling at the Guildford School of Acting in her late 20s. She subsequently joined the Royal National Theatre, gaining attention for her performances in plays such as Benefactors (1984), for which she received a nomination for the Laurence Olivier Award for Actress of the Year in a New Play. She made her Broadway debut in the revival of the Marsha Norman play 'Night Mother (2004).

Blethyn made her screen debut in the Mike Leigh television film Grown-Ups (1980). She has since starred in the sitcoms Chance in a Million (1984–1986), The Labours of Erica (1989–1990), Outside Edge (1994–1996), and Kate & Koji (2020–2022). She received Primetime Emmy Award nominations playing Auguste van Pels in Anne Frank: The Whole Story (2001) and for her guest role in Law & Order: Special Victims Unit (2008). From 2011 to 2025, she starred in ITV crime drama series Vera portraying Detective Chief Inspector Vera Stanhope.

She made her feature film debut with a small part in Nicolas Roeg's The Witches (1990). She starred in the Mike Leigh film Secrets & Lies (1996), which earned her a Cannes Film Festival Award for Best Actress as well as a nomination for the Academy Award for Best Actress. She was also Oscar-nominated for her role in Little Voice (1998). Her other notable film credits include A River Runs Through It (1992), Girls' Night (1998), Saving Grace (2000), Lovely & Amazing (2001), Plots with a View (2002), Pumpkin (2002), A Way of Life (2004), Pride & Prejudice (2005), and Atonement (2007).

== Early life and education ==
Born in Ramsgate, Kent, Blethyn was the youngest of nine children in a Roman Catholic, working-class family. Her mother, Louisa Kathleen (née Supple; 10 May 1904 – 21 June 1992), was a housewife and former maid who had met Blethyn's father, William Charles Bottle (5 March 1894 – 9 January 1985) in approximately 1922 while working for the same household in Broadstairs, Kent. Bottle had previously worked as a shepherd, and spent six years in British India with the Royal Field Artillery immediately prior to returning home to Broadstairs to become the family's chauffeur. Before WWII, he found work as a mechanic at the Vauxhall car factory in Luton, Bedfordshire.

The family lived in poor circumstances at their maternal grandmother's home. In 1944, after an engagement of 20 years and the births of eight children, the couple wed and moved into a small, rented house in Ramsgate. By the time Blethyn was born in 1946, her three eldest siblings—Pam, Ted, and Bernard—had already left home. Her parents introduced Blethyn to film, taking her to the cinema weekly.

Blethyn trained at technical college and worked as a stenographer and bookkeeper for a bank as a young adult. Towards the end of her first marriage, she opted to turn her hobby of amateur dramatics to her professional advantage. After studying at the Guildford School of Acting, she went onto the London stage in 1976, performing several seasons at the Royal National Theatre. In the following three years, she participated in Troilus and Cressida, Tamburlaine the Great, The Fruits of Enlightenment opposite Sir Ralph Richardson, Bedroom Farce, The Passion, and Strife.

== Career ==
=== 1980–1995: Early work and sitcom roles ===
After winning the Critics' Circle Theatre Awards for Best Supporting Actress (for Steaming) in 1980, Blethyn made her screen debut, starring in the play Grown Ups as part of the BBC's Playhouse strand. Directed by Mike Leigh, their first collaboration marked the start of a professional relationship which would later earn both of them huge acclaim. Blethyn followed this with roles in Shakespearean adaptations for the BBC, playing Cordelia in King Lear and Joan of Arc in Henry VI, Part 1. She also appeared with Robert Bathurst and others in the popular BBC Radio 4 comedy series Dial M For Pizza. In the following years, Blethyn expanded her status as a professional stage actress, appearing in productions including A Midsummer Night's Dream, Dalliance, The Beaux' Stratagem, and Born Yesterday. She was nominated for an Olivier Award for her performance as Sheila in Benefactors. Meanwhile, she continued with roles on British television, playing opposite Simon Callow as Tom Chance's frustrated fiancée Alison Little in three series of the sitcom Chance in a Million. She also had roles in comedies such as Yes Minister (1981), Who Dares Wins and a variety of roles in the BBC Radio 4 comedy Delve Special alongside Stephen Fry and a role in the school comedy/drama King Street Junior.

In 1989, she starred in The Labours of Erica, a sitcom written for her by Chance in a Million writers Richard Fegen and Andrew Norriss. Blethyn played Erica Parsons, a single mother approaching her fortieth birthday who realises that life is passing her by. Finding her teenage diary and discovering a list of twelve tasks and ambitions which she had set for herself, Erica sets out to complete them before reaching the milestone. After 15 years of working in theatre and television, Blethyn made her big screen debut with a small role in 1990s dark fantasy film The Witches. The film, based on the same-titled book by Roald Dahl, co-starred actresses Anjelica Huston and Jane Horrocks. Witches received generally positive reviews, as did Blethyn, whom Craig Butler of All Media Guide considered as a "valuable support" for her performance of the mother, Mrs Jenkins.

In 1991, after starring in a play in New York City, Blethyn was recommended to Robert Redford to audition for the soft-spoken mother role in his next project A River Runs Through It (1992). A period drama based on the same-titled 1976 novel by Norman Maclean, also starring Craig Sheffer and Brad Pitt, the film revolves around two sons of a Presbyterian minister—one studious and the other rebellious—as they grow up and come of age during the Prohibition era in the United States. Portraying a second-generation immigrant of Scottish heritage, Redford required Blethyn to adopt a Western American accent for her performance, prompting her to live in Livingston, Montana, in preparation of her role. The film, budgeted at US$19million, became a financial and critical success, resulting in a US box office total of US$43.3 million.

Simultaneously Blethyn continued working on stage and in British television. Between 1990 and 1996, she starred in five different plays, including An Ideal Husband at the Royal Exchange Theatre, Manchester, Tales from the Vienna Woods and Wildest Dreams with the Royal Shakespeare Company and her American stage debut Absent Friends, for which eventually received a Theatre World Award for Outstanding New Talent. She played character parts in the BBC adaptation of Hanif Kureishi's The Buddha of Suburbia and the ITV cricketing comedy-drama series Outside Edge, based on the play by television writer Richard Harris. Blethyn also performed in a variety of episodes of Alas Smith & Jones and Maigret.

=== 1996–2003: Film breakthrough and acclaim ===
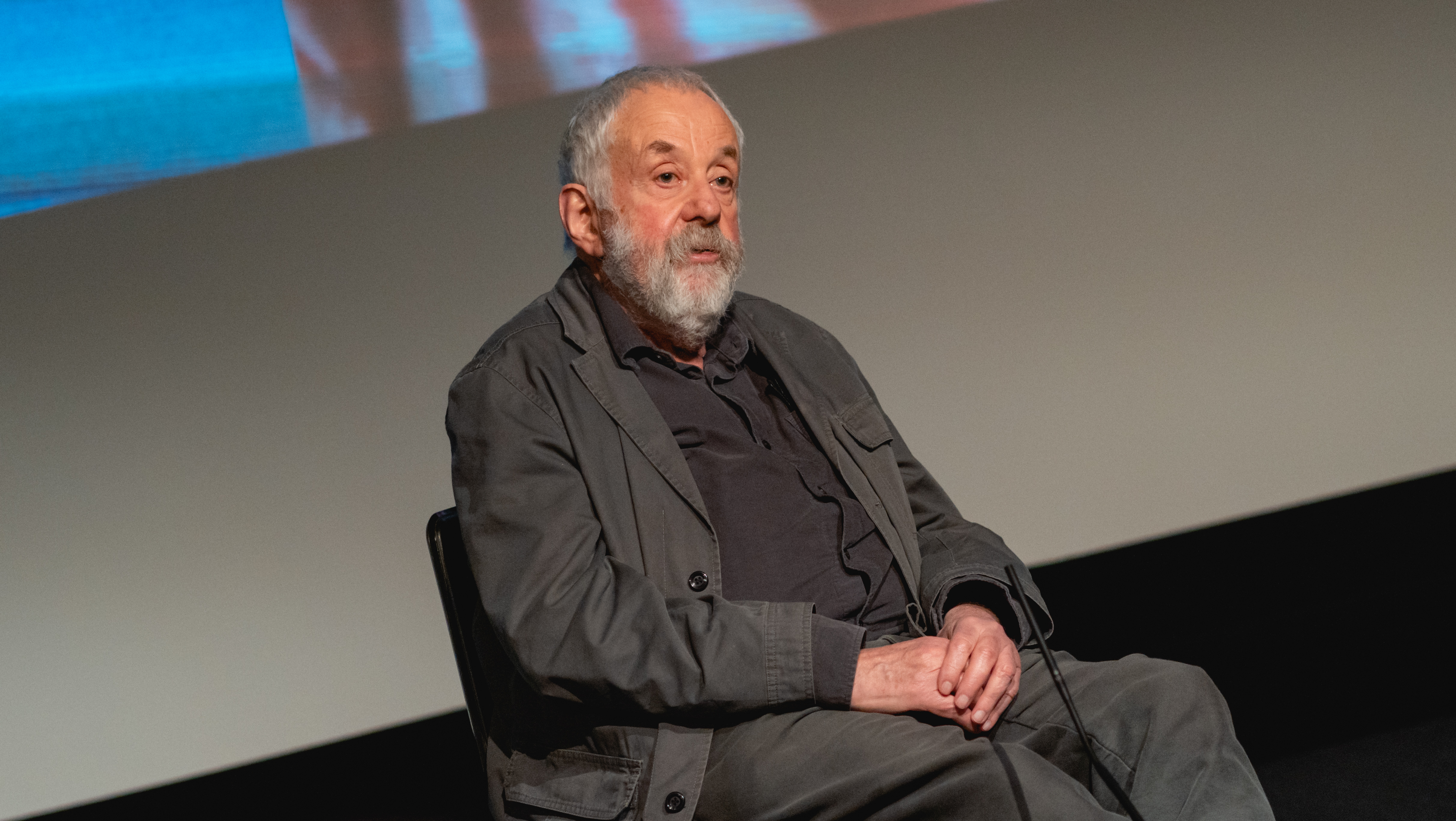
Blethyn acted in the Mike Leigh film Secrets and Lies (1996) which earned her a nomination for the Academy Award for Best Actress

Blethyn's breakthrough came with Mike Leigh's 1996 drama Secrets & Lies. Starring alongside Marianne Jean-Baptiste, she portrayed a lower-class box factory worker, who after years once again comes in contact with her illegitimate grown-up black daughter, whom she gave up for adoption 30 years earlier. For her improvised performance, Blethyn was praised with a variety of awards, including the Best Actress Award at the 1996 Cannes Film Festival, the British Academy Award, a BAFTA Award, a Golden Globe and an Academy Award nomination for Best Actress. Upon its success, Blethyn later stated: "I knew it was a great film, but I didn't expect it to get the attention it did because none of his other films had and I thought they were just as good. Of course, I didn't know what it was about until I saw it in the cinema because of the way that he works—but I knew it was good. That it reached a wider audience surprised me." Besides critical acclaim Secrets & Lies also became a financial success; budgeted at an estimated $4.5 million, the film grossed an unexpected $13.5 million in its limited theatrical run in North America.

The following year, Blethyn appeared in a supporting role in Nick Hurran's debut feature Remember Me? (1997), a middle class suburban farce revolving around a family whose life is thrown into chaos upon the arrival of an old university crush. Forging another collaboration with the director, the actress was cast alongside Julie Walters for Hurran's next project, 1998's Girls' Night, a drama film about two sisters-in-law, one dying of cancer, who fulfil a lifelong dream of going to Las Vegas, Nevada, after an unexpected jackpot win on the bingo. Loosely based upon the real experiences by writer Kay Mellor, the production was originally destined for television until Granada Productions found backing from Showtime. Premiered to a mixed response by critics at the 1998 Sundance Film Festival, who noted it a "rather formulaic tearjerker [with] two powerhouse Brit actresses," Hurran won a Silver Spire at the San Francisco International Film Festival and received a Golden Berlin Bear nomination at the Berlin International Film Festival for his work. In John Lynch's Night Train (1998), Blethyn played a timid spinster who strikes up a friendship with John Hurt's character, an ex-prisoner, who rents a room in her house while on the run from some nasty gangsters. A romantic drama with comedic and thrilling elements, the film was shot at several locations in Ireland, England and Italy in 1997, and received a limited release the following year. The film received a mixed reception from critics. Adrian Wootton of The Guardian called it "an impressive directorial debut [that] mainly succeeds because [of] the talents of its lead actors". The film was nominated for a Crystal Star at the Brussels International Film Festival. Blethyn also starred in James Bogle's film adaption of Tim Winton's 1988 novel In the Winter Dark (1998).

Blethyn's last film of 1998 was Little Voice opposite Jane Horrocks and Michael Caine. Cast against type, she played a domineering yet needy fish factory worker, who has nothing but contempt for her shy daughter and lusts after a local showbiz agent. A breakaway from the kind at heart roles Blethyn had previously played, it was the character's antipathy that attracted the actress to accept the role of Mari: "I have to understand why she is the way she is. She is a desperate woman, but she also has an optimistic take on life which I find enviable. Whilst I don't approve of her behaviour, there is a reason for it and it was my job to work that out." Both Blethyn's performance and the film received rave reviews, and the following year, she was again Oscar nominated, this time for Best Supporting Actress for her performance. Blethyn's first film of 2000 was the indie comedy Saving Grace with Craig Ferguson. Blethyn played a middle-aged newly widowed woman who is faced with the prospect of financial ruin and turns to growing marijuana under the tutelage of her gardener to save her home. Her performance in the film received favourable reviews; Peter Travers wrote for Rolling Stone: "It's Blethyn's solid-gold charm [that] turns Saving Grace into a comic high." The following year, Blethyn received her third Golden Globe nomination for her role in the film, which grossed an unexpected $24million worldwide. That same year, she also had a smaller role in the short comedy Yes You Can.

In 2001, Blethyn signed on to star in her own CBS sitcom, The Seven Roses, in which she was to play the role of a widowed innkeeper and matriarch of an eccentric family. Originally slated to be produced by two former executive producers of Frasier, plans for a pilot eventually went nowhere due to early casting conflicts. Afterwards, Blethyn accepted a supporting role as Auguste van Pels in the ABC miniseries Anne Frank: The Whole Story based on the book by Melissa Müller, for which she garnered her first Emmy Award nomination. Following this, Blethyn starred in the films Daddy and Them, On the Nose, and Lovely & Amazing. In Billy Bob Thornton's Daddy and Them, she portrayed an English neurotic psychologist, who feels excluded by the American clan she married into due to her nationality. The film scored a generally positive reception but was financially unsuccessful, leading to a direct-to-TV release stateside. In Canadian-Irish comedy On the Nose, Blethyn played the minor role of the all-disapproving wife of Brendan Delaney, played by Robbie Coltrane. Her appearance was commented as "underused" by Harry Guerin, writer for RTÉ Entertainment. Blethyn depicted an affluent but desperate and distracted matriarch of three daughters in Nicole Holofcener's independent drama Lovely & Amazing, featuring Catherine Keener, Emily Mortimer and Jake Gyllenhaal. The film became Blethyn's biggest box-office success of the year with a worldwide gross of $5 million only, and earned the actress mixed reviews from professional critics. She also did the UK voice of Dr. Florence Mountfitchet in the Bob the Builder special, "The Knights of Can-A-Lot".

In 2002, Blethyn appeared with Christina Ricci in the dark comedy Pumpkin, a financial disaster. The film opened to little notice and grossed less than $300,000 during its North American theatrical run. Her performance as the overprotective wine-soaked mother of a disabled teenage boy generated Blethyn mostly critical reviews. Entertainment Weekly writer Lisa Schwarzbaum called her "challenged, unsure [... and] miscast." Her following film, limitedly-released Nicolas Cage's Sonny, saw similar success. While the production was panned in general, the actress earned mixed reviews for her performance of an eccentric ex-prostitute and mother, as some critics such as Kevin Thomas considered her casting as "problematic [due to] caricatured acting." Blethyn eventually received more acclaim when she accepted the lead role in the dark comedy Plots with a View. Starring alongside Alfred Molina, the pair was praised for their "genuine chemistry." A year after, Blethyn co-starred with Bob Hoskins and Jessica Alba in historical direct-to-video drama The Sleeping Dictionary. The film earned her a DVDX Award but received mixed critics, as did Blizzard, a Christmas movie in which Blethyn played the eccentric character of Aunt Millie, the narrator of the film's story. 2003 ended with the mini series Between the Sheets, in which Blethyn starred as a woman struggling with her own ambivalent feelings towards her husband and sex.

=== 2004–2010: Established actress ===
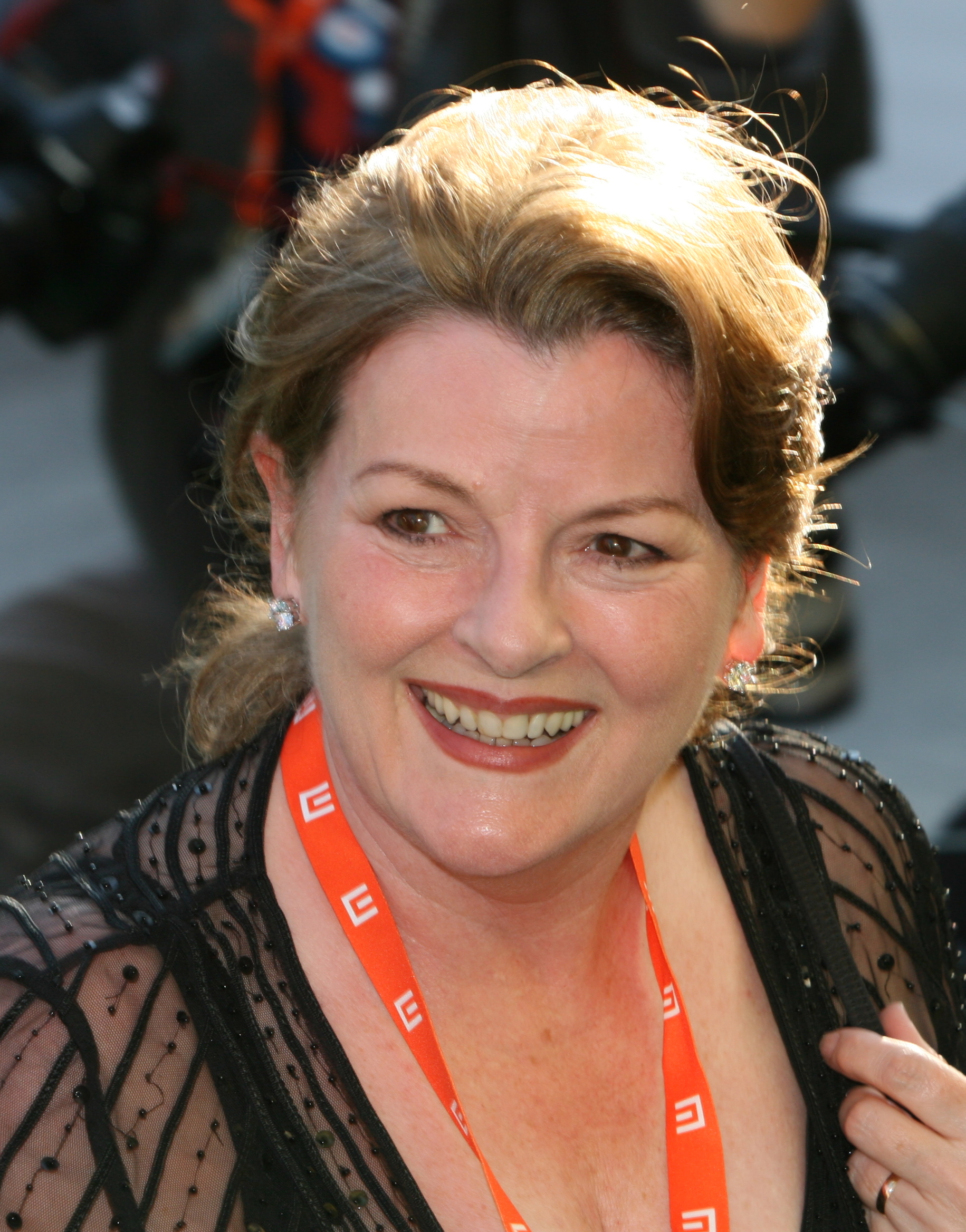
Blethyn at 43rd Karlovy Vary International Film Festival in 2008

Blethyn co-starred as Bobby Darin's mother Polly Cassotto in Beyond the Sea, a 2004 biographical film about the singer. The film was a financial disappointment: budgeted at an estimated US$25 million, it opened to little notice and grossed only $6 million in its North American theatrical run. Margaret Pomeranz of At the Movies said that her casting was "a bit mystifying". Afterwards, Blethyn starred in A Way of Life, playing a bossy and censorious mother-in-law of a struggling young woman, played by Stephanie James, and in the television film Belonging, starring as a middle-aged childless woman who is left to look after the elderly relatives of her husband and to make a new life for herself after he leaves her for a younger woman. Blethyn received a Golden FIPA Award and a BAFTA nomination for the latter role. That same year she made her Broadway debut in the play 'Night Mother opposite Edie Falco. Ben Brantley of The New York Times wrote that while "she has the requisite fretful voice and fidgety mannerisms down pat, it's as if she is doing a technically perfect impersonation in a vacuum."

In early 2005, Blethyn appeared in the indie-drama On a Clear Day playing Joan, a Glasgow housewife, who secretly enrolls in bus-driving classes after her husband's dismissal. Her performance in the film received positive reviews; ABC writer MaryAnn Johanson wrote: "It's Blethyn, who wraps the movie in a cosy, comfortable, maternal hug that reassures you that it will weather its risk-taking with aplomb [...]." The film became a minor success at the international box-office chart, barely grossing $1million worldwide, but was awarded a BAFTA Scotland Award for Best Film and Screenplay.

A major hit for Blethyn came with Joe Wright's Pride & Prejudice, a 2005 adaptation of the same-titled novel by Jane Austen. Starring alongside Keira Knightley and Donald Sutherland, Blethyn played Mrs. Bennet, a fluttery mother of five sisters who desperately schemes to marry her daughters off to men of means. During promotion of the film, she noted of her portrayal of the character: "I've always thought she had a real problem and shouldn't be made fun of. She's pushy with a reason. As soon as Mr. Bennet dies, all the money goes down the male line; she has to save her daughters from penury." With both a worldwide gross of over US$121million and several Academy Award and Golden Globe nominations, the film became a critical and commercial success, spawning Blethyn another BAFTA Award nomination for Best Actress in a Supporting Role. In 2007, she appeared in the independent Australian coming-of-age comedy Clubland. Playing a character that was created specifically with her in mind, Blethyn portrayed a bawdy comedian with a sinking career faced with the romantic life of her young son, played by Khan Chittenden. The film was released in Australia in June 2007 and was screened Sundance Film Festival where distributed Warner Independent Pictures for a $4million deal and gained positive reviews. Los Angeles Times film critic Carina Chocano wrote, "the movie belongs to Blethyn, who takes a difficult, easily misunderstood role and gracefully cracks it open to reveal what's inside." The role earned her nominations for the Australian Film Institute Award and an Inside Film Award.

Also in 2007, Blethyn reunited with Joe Wright on Atonement, an adaptation from Ian McEwan's critically acclaimed novel of the same name. On her role of a housekeeper in a cast that also features Keira Knightley, Saoirse Ronan and James McAvoy, Blethyn commented: "It's a tiny, tiny part. If you blink you'll miss me." The film garnered generally positive reviews from film critics and received a Best Picture nomination at the 2008 Academy Awards. A box office success around the globe, it went on to gross a total of $129million worldwide. Blethyn also appeared as Márja Dmitrijewna Achrosímowa in a supporting role in the internationally produced 2007 miniseries War and Peace by RAI, filmed in Russia and Lithuania.

In 2008, Blethyn made her American small screen debut with a guest role on CBS sitcom The New Adventures of Old Christine, playing the neurotic mother to Julia Louis-Dreyfus' character in the fourth season episode "Guess Who's Not Coming to Dinner." The same year, she appeared in a single season ten episode of the NBC legal drama series Law & Order: Special Victims Unit. Her performance of a sympathetic fugitive of domestic violence and rape that killed her first husband in self-defense earned Blethyn another Primetime Emmy Award for Outstanding Guest Actress – Drama Series nomination. Blethyn provided the voice of Mama Heffalump in the animated Disney movie, Pooh's Heffalump Movie (2005) and later again provided the voice of Mama Heffalump in the Disney direct-to-video animated sequel Tigger & Pooh and a Musical Too (2009).

Blethyn's first film in two years, Rachid Bouchareb's London River opened at the 59th Berlin International Film Festival in 2009 where it won a Special Mention by the Ecumenical Jury. In the film, for which Blethyn had to learn French, she portrays a mother waiting for news of her missing child after the London bombings of July 2005, striking up a friendship with a Muslim man, whose child has also disappeared. Blethyn, who had initially felt sceptical and reticent about the film due to its background, was originally not available for filming but Bouchareb decided to delay filming to work with her. Upon release, the film received favourable reviews, particularly for its "dynamite acting". Mike Scott from The Times-Picayune commented "that Blethyn's performance is nuanced [...] it's that performance—at turns sweet, funny and heartbreaking—that ultimately draws viewers in and defies them to stop watching".

Also in 2009, Blethyn played a Benedictine nun in Jan Dunn's film The Calling, also starring Joanna Scanlan and Pauline McLynn. Dunn's third feature film, it tells the story of Joanna, played by Emily Beecham, who after graduating from university, goes against her family and friends when she decides to join a closed order of nuns. Released to film festivals in 2009, the independent drama was not released to UK cinemas until 2010. Critics compared it to soap opera and described it as "half Doubt, half Hollyoaks". Blethyn earned positive reviews for her performance; The Guardian writer Catherine Shoard wrote that "only she, really, manages to ride the rollercoaster jumps in plot and tone." Her last film of 2009 was Alex De Rakoff's crime film Dead Man Running alongside Tamer Hassan, Danny Dyer, and 50 Cent, in which she portrayed the wheelchair-using mother of a criminal who is taken hostage. The film received universally negative reviews from film critics, who deemed it to be full of "poor performances, stiff dialogue, [and] flat characters".

=== 2011–2023: Vera and other roles ===
In May 2011, Blethyn began playing the title role in ITV's crime drama series Vera as the Northern character Vera Stanhope, a nearly retired detective chief inspector obsessive about her work and driven by her own demons, based on the novels of Ann Cleeves. Initially broadcast to mixed reviews, it has since received favourable reviews, with Chitra Ramaswamy from The Guardian writing in 2016: "Blethyn is the best thing about Vera [...] She has the loveliest voice, at once girlish and gruff. Her face is kind but means business. Not many actors can pull off shambolic but effective but Blethyn can do it with a single, penetrating glance from beneath that hat." Averaging up to nine million people per episode in the United Kingdom, Vera became one of the most watched British dramas of the 2010s. Blethyn, who received the 2017 RTS North East & Border Television Award for her performance, portrayed Stanhope in 14 series of the show, until it ended in January 2025.

Blethyn's only film of 2011 was the Christmas drama My Angel about a boy looking for an angel to save his mother after an accident. Shot in Northwood for less than £2million, My Angel scooped best film, newcomer, director and screenplay, plus best actor and actress for Blethyn and Spall at the Monaco International Film Festival. In 2012, Blethyn starred opposite singer Tom Jones and actress Alison Steadman in the short film King of the Teds, directed by Jim Cartwright, as part of Sky Arts Playhouse Presents series. She played an old flame who gets in touch with a former boyfriend by Facebook, introducing tensions and doubts from 40 years before.

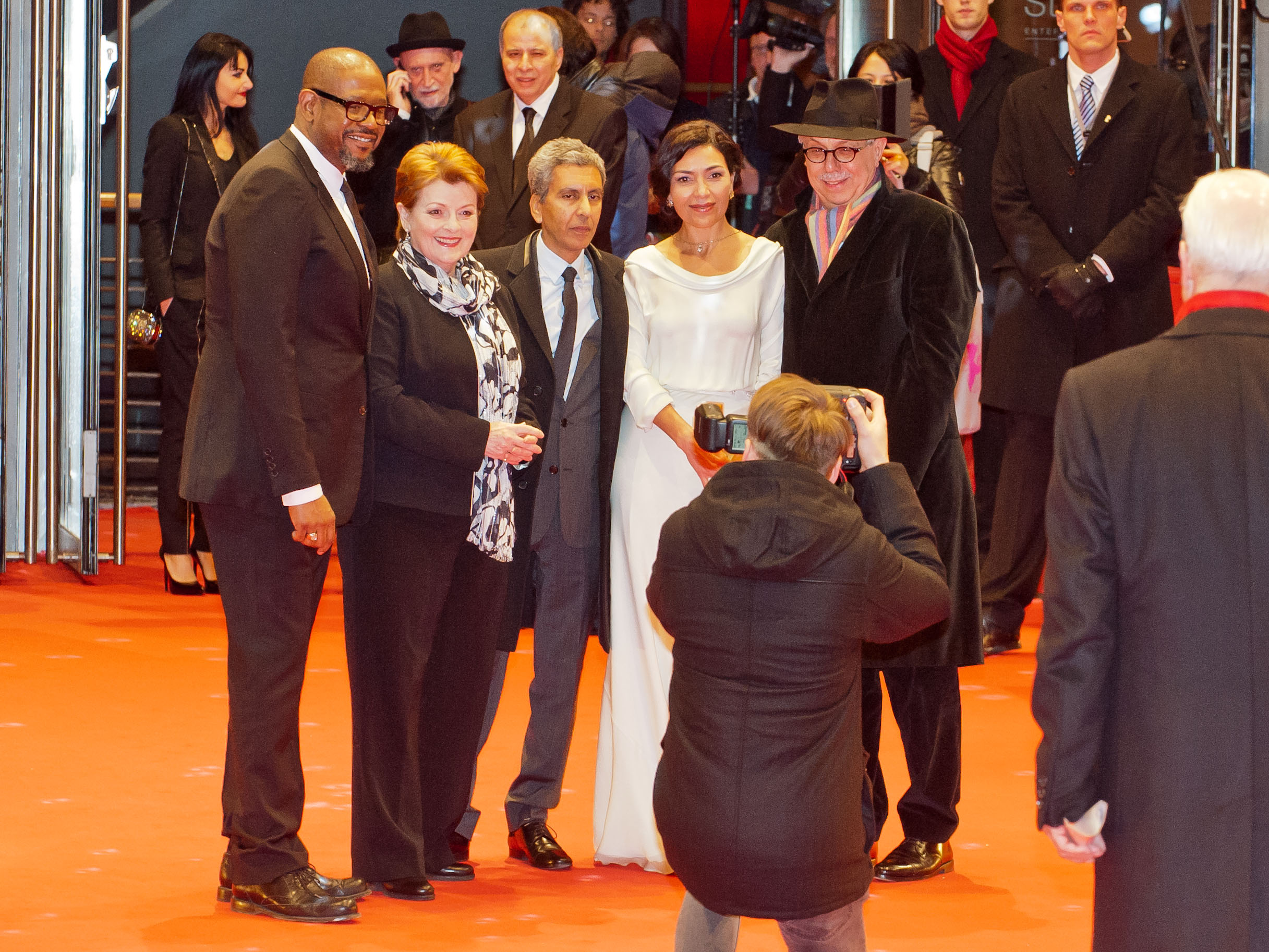
Blethyn along with her cast and crew of Two Men in Town (2014) at the 2014 Berlin Film Festival.

In March 2013, Blethyn costarred with Hilary Swank in the BBC movie Mary and Martha. Based on a screenplay by Richard Curtis and directed by Phillip Noyce, it involves two very different women who both lose their sons to malaria. The film received mixed reviews from critics, with Linda Stasi from The New York Post writing that "while Swank and Blethyn make everything they're in more remarkable for their presence, the movie plays more like a based-on-fact Lifetime flick than an HBO work of fiction." Also in 2013, Blethyn began voicing the supporting character of Ernestine Enormomonster in two seasons of the children's animated television series Henry Hugglemonster, based on the 2005 book I'm a Happy Hugglewug by Niamh Sharkey.

In 2014, Blethyn reteamed with filmmaker Rachid Bouchareb for the French–American drama film Two Men in Town (2014), a remake of the 1973 film. Along with Forest Whitaker and Harvey Keitel, Blethyn portrays a parole officer in the Western film shot in New Mexico. Whilst critical reception towards the film as a whole was lukewarm, Sherilyn Connelly from The Village Voice remarked that Blethyn "is wonderful as an all-too-rare character, a middle-aged woman who holds her own in a position of authority over violent men." In January 2015, Blethyn was presented the Lifetime Achievement Award at the 19th Capri Hollywood International Film Festival.

In 2016, Blethyn lent her voice to the British animated biographical film Ethel & Ernest, based on the graphic memoir of the same name that follows Raymond Briggs' parents through their marriage, from the 1920s to their deaths in the 1970s. The film earned favorable reviews from critics, who called it "gentle, poignant, and vividly animated" as well as "a warm character study with an evocative sense of time and place." Blethyn received a nomination in the Best Voice Performance category at the British Animation Awards 2018. From 2020 to 2022, she played Kate Abbott, the cafe-owner in Kate and Koji who developed strong friendships with two asylum-seeking doctors: Jimmy Akingbola in Series 1 and Okorie Chukwu in Series 2. In 2021, Blethyn was awarded the Lifetime Achievement Award at the 2021 Rose d'Or awards.

=== 2024–present: Post-Vera roles ===
In 2024, Blethyn filmed Dragonfly, her first big screen project in a decade. Written and directed by Paul Andrew Williams, she portrayed Elsie in the film, an elderly woman living alone, who has lost her independence after a fall and forms an unlikely bond with her next-door neighbour Colleen, a social outcast, played by Andrea Riseborough. Dragonfly had its world premiere at the Tribeca Festival, where Blethyn and Riseborough received a joint performance award in June 2025. The following month, the film won the international feature award at the Galway Film Fleadh in Ireland. Released to favorable reviews, Peter Bradshaw from The Guardian described the film as "stark, fierce, wonderfully acted," and "riveting" with "elements of Mike Leigh but also moments of thriller and even horror."

Blethyn will next co-star alongside Karen Gillan and Jim Broadbent in director Guy Jenkin's Fools, which explores the story of Mary Tudor's friendship with her female court jester. She has also filmed the Channel 4 television series A Woman of Substance, a new adaptation of Barbara Taylor Bradford's best-seller, in which she will take the role of the older Emma Harte, once an impoverished Yorkshire maid who builds from one clothes shop to becoming the richest woman in the world.

== Personal life ==
Blethyn married Alan James Blethyn, a graphic designer she met while working for British Rail, in 1964. The marriage ended in 1973. Blethyn kept her husband's surname as her professional name. British art director Michael Mayhew has been her partner since 1975, and the couple married in June 2010.

Blethyn was appointed Officer of the Order of the British Empire (OBE) for services to drama in the 2003 New Year Honours.

== Acting credits ==
=== Film ===
Year	Title	Role	Notes
1981	Say No to Strangers	Teresa's Mum	Uncredited; short film
1990	The Witches	Mrs. Jenkins	
1992	A River Runs Through It	Mrs. Maclean	
1996	Secrets & Lies	Cynthia Rose Purley	
1997	Remember Me?	Shirley	
1998	Girls' Night	Dawn Wilkinson	
1998	Music from Another Room	Grace Swan	
1998	Night Train	Alice Mooney	
1998	In the Winter Dark	Ida Stubbs	
1998	Little Voice	Mari Hoff	
2000	Saving Grace	Grace Trevethyn	
2001	Daddy and Them	July Montgomery	
2001	Lovely & Amazing	Jane Marks	
2001	On the Nose	Mrs. Delaney	
2002	Pumpkin	Judy Romanoff	
2002	Sonny	Jewel Phillips	
2002	Plots with a View	Betty Rhys-Jones	
2002	The Wild Thornberrys Movie	Mrs. Alice June Fairgood	Voice
2003	The Sleeping Dictionary	Aggie Bullard	
2003	Blizzard	Aunt Millie	
2004	Piccadilly Jim	Nina Banks	
2004	Beyond the Sea	Polly Cassotto	
2004	A Way of Life	Annette	
2004	Belonging	Jess Copplestone	
2005	Pooh's Heffalump Movie	Mama Heffalump	Voice
2005	On a Clear Day	Joan Redmond	
2005	Pride & Prejudice	Mrs. Bennet	
2006	Mysterious Creatures	Wendy Ainscow	
2007	Clubland	Jean Dwight	
2007	Atonement	Grace Turner	
2009	London River	Elisabeth Sommers	
2009	Tigger & Pooh and a Musical Too	Mama Heffalump	Voice
2009	The Calling	Sister Ignatious	
2009	Dead Man Running	Mrs. Kane	
2011	My Angel	Headmistress	
2014	Two Men in Town	Emily Smith	
2016	Ethel & Ernest	Ethel Briggs	Voice
2020	Strawberry Fields Forever	Gran	Short film
2025	Dragonfly	Elsie	

=== Television ===
Year	Title	Role	Notes
1980	Grown-Ups	Gloria	Television film
1980	Can We Get on Now, Please?	Miranda Plumley	Episode: "Variations in Two Flats"
1980	Play for Today	Mary	Episode: "The Imitation Game"
1980	Bedroom Farce	Kate	Television film
1981	Yes Minister	Joan Littler	Episode: "The Greasy Pole"
1982	King Lear	Cordelia	Television film
1983	Tales of the Unexpected	Carol Hutchins	Episode: "Hit and Run"
1983	Death of an Expert Witness	Angela Foley	Television miniseries; 6 episodes
1983	Play for Today	Janice	Episode: "Floating Off"
1983	Rumpole of the Bailey	Pauline	Episode: "Rumpole and the Genuine Article"
1983	The First Part of Henry the Sixth	Joan la Pucelle	Television film
1984	Weekend Playhouse	Jean Saunders	Episode: "Singles Weekend"
1984–1986	Chance in a Million	Alison Little	Main role; 18 episodes
1985	That Uncertain Feeling	Mrs. Lewis	Miniseries; 4 episodes
1987	Sunday Premiere	Sylvia	Episode: "Claws"
1987	Poor Little Rich Girl	Ticki Tocquet	Television film
1988	The Storyteller	Storyteller's Wife	Episode: "A Story Short"
1989	The Play on One	Miss A.	Episode: "The Shawl"
1989–1990	The Labours of Erica	Erica Parsons	Main role; 12 episodes
1991	All Good Things	Shirley Frame	Miniseries; 6 episodes
1993	The Buddha of Suburbia	Margaret Amir	Miniseries; 4 episodes
1994–1996	Outside Edge	Miriam Dervish	22 episodes
2001	Anne Frank: The Whole Story	Auguste Van Pels	2 episodes
2003	Between the Sheets	Hazel Delany	Miniseries; 6 episodes
2007	War and Peace	Márja Dmitrijewna Achrosímowa	4 episodes
2008	The New Adventures of Old Christine	Angela Kimble	Episode: "Guess Who's Not Coming to Dinner?"
2008	Law & Order: Special Victims Unit	Linnie Malcolm / Caroline Cresswell	Episode: "Persona"
2011–2025	Vera	DCI Vera Stanhope	Main role; 56 episodes
2012	Playhouse Presents	Nina	Episode: "King of the Teds"
2013	Mary and Martha	Martha O'Connell	Television film
2020–2022	Kate & Koji	Kate	Main role; 12 episodes
2026	A Woman of Substance	Emma Harte	Main role

=== Theatre ===
Year	Title	Role	Playwright	Venue	Ref.
1976	The Madras House	Jane Huxtable	Harley Granville-Barker	Royal National Theatre	
1976	Tamburlaine	Ebea	Christopher Marlowe	Royal National Theatre	
1976	The Force of Habit	Granddaughter	Thomas Bernhard	Royal National Theatre	
1977	Bedroom Farce	Kate	Alan Ayckbourn	Royal National Theatre	
1981	Steaming	Dawn	Nell Dunn	Theatre Royal Stratford East	
1983	Crimes of the Heart	Lenny Magrath	Beth Henley	Bush Theatre	
1984	Benefactors	Sheila	Michael Frayn	Vaudeville Theatre	
1986	Dalliance	Christine	Tom Stoppard	Royal National Theatre	
1987	A Doll's House	Nora	Henrik Ibsen	Manchester Royal Exchange	
1988	Born Yesterday	Billie Dawn	Garson Kanin	Manchester Royal Exchange	
1991	Absent Friends	Diana	Alan Ayckbourn	New York City Center	
1992	An Ideal Husband	Mrs. Cheverley	Oscar Wilde	Manchester Royal Exchange	
1994	The Bed Before Yesterday	Alma	Ben Travers	Almeida Theatre	
1996	Habeas Corpus	Muriel Wicksteed	Alan Bennett	Donmar Warehouse	
2002	Mrs Warren's Profession	Mrs Warren	George Bernard Shaw	Strand Theatre	
2004	'night, Mother	Thelma Cates	Marsha Norman	Royale Theatre, Broadway	
2008	The Glass Menagerie	Amanda Wingfield	Tennessee Williams	Manchester Royal Exchange	
2009	Haunted	Mrs. Berry	Edna O'Brien	Manchester Royal Exchange	

== Awards and nominations ==
Blethyn received a BAFTA Film Award, a Golden Globe Award, and a Cannes Film Festival Award for her role in Secrets & Lies (1996). Over her career she has received nominations for an Academy Award, a BAFTA Television Award, a Laurence Olivier Award, two Primetime Emmy Awards, and three Screen Actors Guild Awards. In 2017, she was named Performer of the Year by the Royal Television Society for her role in Vera. She was appointed Officer of the Order of the British Empire (OBE) for services to drama in 2003.
