= Patrilocal residence =

Social system in which a couple resides near a husband's parents' residence

In social anthropology, patrilocal residence or patrilocality, also known as virilocal residence or virilocality, are terms referring to the social system in which a married couple resides with or near the husband's parents. The concept of location may extend to a larger area such as a village, town or clan territory. The practice has been found in around 70 percent of the world's modern human cultures that have been described ethnographically. Archaeological evidence for patrilocality has also been found among Neanderthal remains in Spain and for ancient hominids in Africa.

== Description ==
In a patrilocal society, when a man marries, his wife joins him in his father's home or compound, where they raise their children. These children will follow the same pattern. Sons will stay and daughters will move in with their husbands' families. Families living in a patrilocal residence generally assume joint ownership of domestic sources. The household is led by a senior member, who also directs the labor of all other members.

Matrilocal residence may be regarded as the opposite of patrilocal residence.

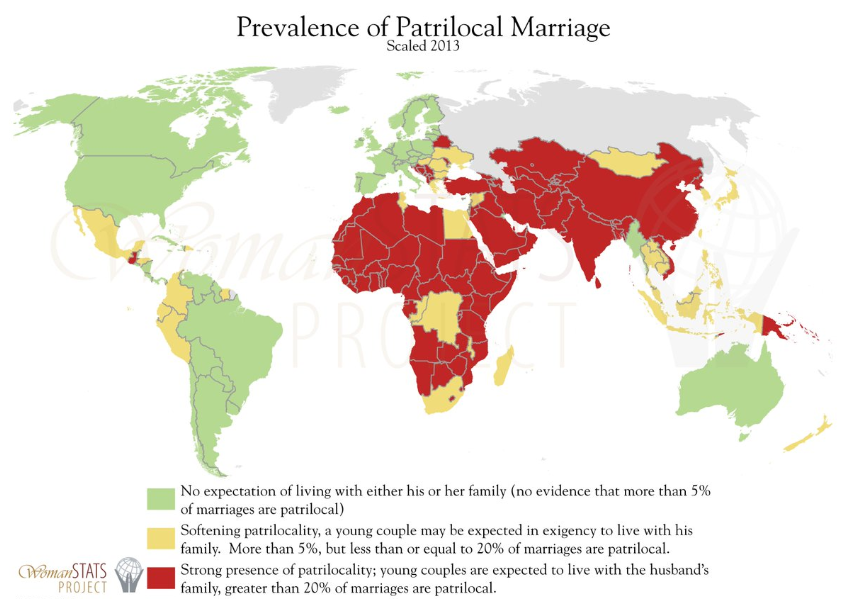
World map showing prevalence of patrilocal marriage by country

Early theories explaining the determinants of postmarital residence (e.g., Lewis Henry Morgan, Edward Tylor, or George Peter Murdock) connected it with the sexual division of labor. However, to date, cross-cultural tests of this hypothesis using worldwide samples have failed to find any significant relationship between these two variables. However, Korotayev's tests show that the female contribution to subsistence does correlate significantly with matrilocal (as opposed to patrilocal) residence in general; however, this correlation is masked by a general polygyny factor. Although an increase in the female contribution to subsistence tends to lead to matrilocal residence, it also tends simultaneously to lead to general non-sororal polygyny which effectively destroys matrilocality, and pushes a social system toward patrilocality. If this polygyny factor is controlled (e.g., through a multiple regression model), division of labor turns out to be a significant predictor of postmarital residence. Thus, Murdock's hypotheses regarding the relationships between the sexual division of labor and postmarital residence were basically correct, though, as has been shown by Korotayev, the actual relationships between those two groups of variables are more complicated than he expected.

== Linguistic traces ==
In some Slavonic languages, verbs for marrying show evidence of patrilocality. In Polish the verb for "to marry", when done by a woman, is wyjść za mąż while in Russian it is выйти замуж (vyjti zamuzh). Both mean literally "to go out and behind the husband". In comparison, a man in Polish can simply żenić się and in Russian he is able to жениться, both meaning "to wife oneself". (A synonymous expression is wziąć kobietę za żonę/взять в жёны, "to take a woman for a wife").

The verbs for marriage in the Hungarian language show evidence of patrilocality. The verb for "to marry", when done by a woman, is férjhez menni, literally meaning "to leave [the family home] for the husband". However, the verbs házasodni and megházasodni, meaning "to house oneself", and összeházasodni "to house together", can be used by both males and females. Similarly the Spanish term for "to marry", casarse, is gender-neutral and literally means "to house oneself" (from the Spanish casa, "house".) "A married couple" is una pareja casada, which translates as "a housed couple".

Indeed, in many European languages including English, the verb "to marry" may ultimately come from a past participle of Proto-Indo European *mari, for young woman - as in, provided with a *mari.

== Neanderthals and early hominins ==
It is claimed that the practice was also prevalent in some Neanderthal populations. A 49,000-year-old grave was found in Spain in 2010 which contained three related-to-each-other males, with three unrelated-to-each-other females, suggesting they were the partners of the males.

A 2011 study using ratios of strontium isotopes in teeth also suggested that roughly 2 million years ago, among Australopithecus and Paranthropus robustus groups in southern Africa, women tended to settle farther from their region of birth than men did.

A 2022 study of data from 13 Neanderthals from two Middle Palaeolithic sites in the Altai Mountains of southern Siberia—11 from Chagyrskaya Cave and 2 from Okladnikov Cave—was able to examine mitochondrial DNA, which mothers pass down to their children, and compare it to Y chromosomes, which are passed down by fathers. They found more genetic diversity in the mitochondrial DNA, suggesting that women may have moved from community to community more than the men, perhaps when they chose a mate.

== See also ==
- Matrilocal residence
- Neolocal residence
- Patrilineality
- Patriarchy

== Bibliography ==
- Ember, Melvin; Ember, Carol R. (June 1971). "The conditions favoring matrilocal versus patrilocal residence". American Anthropologist. 73 (3). Wiley: 571–594. doi:10.1525/aa.1971.73.3.02a00040. JSTOR 671756.
- Fox, Robin (1967). Kinship and marriage: an anthropological perspective. New York: Cambridge University Press. ISBN 0-521-27823-6.
- Korotayev, Andrey (2001). "An apologia of George Peter Murdock. Division of labor by gender and postmarital residence in cross-cultural perspective: a reconsideration". World Cultures. 12 (2). University of California, Irvine: 179–203. Archived from the original on 2018-04-22. Pdf.
- Korotayev, Andrey (November 2003). "Division of labor by gender and postmarital residence in cross-cultural perspective: a reconsideration". Cross-Cultural Research. 37 (4). SAGE: 335–372. doi:10.1177/1069397103253685. S2CID 145694651.
