= Neolocal residence =

Type of post-marital residence system

Neolocal residence is a type of post-marital residence in which a newly married couple resides separately from both the husband's natal household and the wife's natal household. Neolocal residence forms the basis of most developed nations, especially in the West, and is also found among some nomadic communities.

Upon marriage, each partner is expected to move out of their parents' household and establish a new residence, thus forming the core of an independent nuclear family. Neolocal residence involves the creation of a new household where a child marries or even when they reach adulthood and become socially and economically active. Neolocal residence and nuclear family domestic structures are found in societies where geographical mobility is important. In Western societies, they are consistent with the frequent moves that are necessary due to choices and changes within a supply- and demand-regulated labor market. They are also prevalent in hunting and gathering economies, where nomadic movements are intrinsic to the subsistence strategy.

In western countries, employment in large corporations or the military often calls for frequent relocations, making it nearly impossible for extended families to remain together hence creating new generation of families.

== Description ==
In neolocal residence, newly formed couples form their own separate household units, and create what is considered a nuclear family. This contrasts with other forms of post-marital residence, such as patrilocal residence and matrilocal residence, in which the couple resides with or near the husband's family (patrilocal residence) or the wife's family (matrilocal residence).

The first traces of neolocality in modern American culture begin in Northwestern Europe. It was from there brought to British colonies in the Americas. As American colonists expanded westward, this form of residence remained. Although some believe neolocal residence came as a result of industrialization, there is evidence of neolocality in England from before industrialization. Whatever the relationship between neolocality and economic development is, what is clear is that the two seem to coincide. Countries that experience economic development tend to also experience declines in multi-generational households, and increases in nuclear, neolocal forms of residence. A reason often cited for the high coincidence of neolocality in developed countries is the higher mobility of nuclear families, which becomes more important in modern economies. The decline of dependency on agricultural subsistence, which results in a weakening of extended family ties, is seen as another cause of nuclear, neolocal household creation. A particular case study of the relationship between economic development and neolocal residence patterns is the community of Navajo Mountain, which showed a positive correlation between the two.

Currently, neolocal residence is more commonly found in the west, and is becoming more common in countries that have experienced economic development, like Japan.
