= Saving Grace (2000 film) =

2000 British film by Nigel Cole

- Theatrical release poster
- Directed by: Nigel Cole
- Written by: Mark Crowdy; Craig Ferguson
- Produced by: Mark Crowdy; Xavier Marchand; Cat Villiers
- Starring: Brenda Blethyn; Craig Ferguson; Martin Clunes; Tcheky Karyo
- Cinematography: John de Borman
- Edited by: Alan Strachan
- Music by: Mark Russell
- Distributed by: 20th Century Fox
- Release date: 19 May 2000
- Running time: 93 minutes
- Country: United Kingdom
- Language: English
- Budget: $10 million
- Box office: $26.3 million

Saving Grace is a 2000 British comedy film, directed by Nigel Cole, starring Brenda Blethyn and Craig Ferguson. The screenplay was written by Ferguson and Mark Crowdy. Set in Cornwall, the film tells the story of a middle aged widow whose irresponsible husband left her in an enormous debt, forcing her (and with her gardener Matthew) to grow cannabis in her greenhouse to avoid losing her house. It was co-produced by Fine Line Features, Homerun Productions, Portman Entertainment, Sky Pictures, and Wave Pictures and filmed in London and the villages of Boscastle and Port Isaac in Cornwall. Distributed by 20th Century Fox in the United Kingdom, the film premiered at the 2000 Sundance Film Festival, where it won Cole the Audience Award for World Cinema.

Critical reaction to Saving Grace was generally positive and it received favourable commercial notice for an independent British comedy film, eventually grossing $26,330,482 worldwide, following its theatrical release in the United States. The film received awards from the Norwegian International Film Festival and the Munich Film Festival, also receiving a BAFTA Award nomination for Crowdy, and ALFS Award, Golden Globe and Satellite Award nominations for Blethyn and her performance. Following Saving Grace's release, two television films were produced for Sky Movies: Doc Martin (2001) and Doc Martin and the Legend of the Cloutie (2003). These were followed by the highly successful ITV spin off series called Doc Martin (2004–2022), starring Martin Clunes in a rewritten role as Dr. Martin Ellingham, after appearing in the film as Bamford.

== Plot ==
Soon after the funeral of her husband (who died 'suspiciously' – he 'jumped' out of a plane without a parachute), Cornish housewife Grace Trevethyn discovers that she has been left with his massive debts. Unless she can raise a large amount of money, she will lose both her home and all of her possessions. Her loyal gardener Matthew offers to continue working without pay if she were to care for his dying cannabis plants, so Grace agrees. The plants flourish under her care so, talking with Matthew she realises they could grow and produce lots of cannabis in a short time.

With no other options and a creditor calling her home, Grace agrees to transform her greenhouse for the project. Matthew's girlfriend Nicky disapproves of the plan, particularly as she has recently learned from the town doctor and friend Martin Bamford that she is pregnant. While the plants are growing Grace meets her dead husband's mistress, Honey, but sends her away after realizing that her husband was more sexual with Honey than with her. As she's never tried it, Grace asks Matthew to smoke cannabis with her. They sit on the edge of the sea and share a spliff.

Grace eventually learns that Nicky is pregnant and decides to seek out a buyer on her own to protect Matthew. When this proves to be more difficult than she expected, she has Honey introduce her to a drug dealer, Vince, only for him to lack the capital to purchase such a large crop. He introduces her to French businessman Jacques Chevalier, whom Grace manages to impress with her knowledge of fly fishing and French. After initial disruptions, Chevalier and Grace negotiate a deal for the cannabis, and Grace, Vince, and Dr Bamford (who, with Matthew, had followed Grace to London) head back home; Chevalier secretly instructs his bodyguard to take Vince and follow them to Grace's home.

Once home, Grace discovers that the Women's Institute is preparing to hold a luncheon in her garden, and that the creditors are coming to remove her furniture and possessions. Matthew reconciles with Nicky and to his joy, learns that she's pregnant. Together the two stall Vince and the bodyguard by telling the local Police Sergeant Alfred Mabely that they are poachers. Meanwhile some of the Women's Institute members consume cannabis in liquid form, thinking that it was actually tea.

As Grace and her friends try to dismantle the cultivation, chaos breaks loose as the police (called by Mabely on the purported poachers), Jacques's people, and the creditors all arrive at the house. Grace chooses to burn the cannabis so no one can have it. Unable to resist, Martin opens the doors to the greenhouse and sends out a cloud of cannabis smoke that envelops the crowd. Meanwhile in her home, Grace has discovered Jacques, who tells her that he only wanted his bodyguard to protect her, as he has fallen for her.

Several months later the town's residents gather in the pub to watch a television special about Grace's seemingly overnight transition from an unknown widow to a millionaire after the success of her novel The Joint Venture. The special also covers Grace's marriage to Chevalier, as well as the large riot at her house in which "nobody could remember anything."

== Cast ==
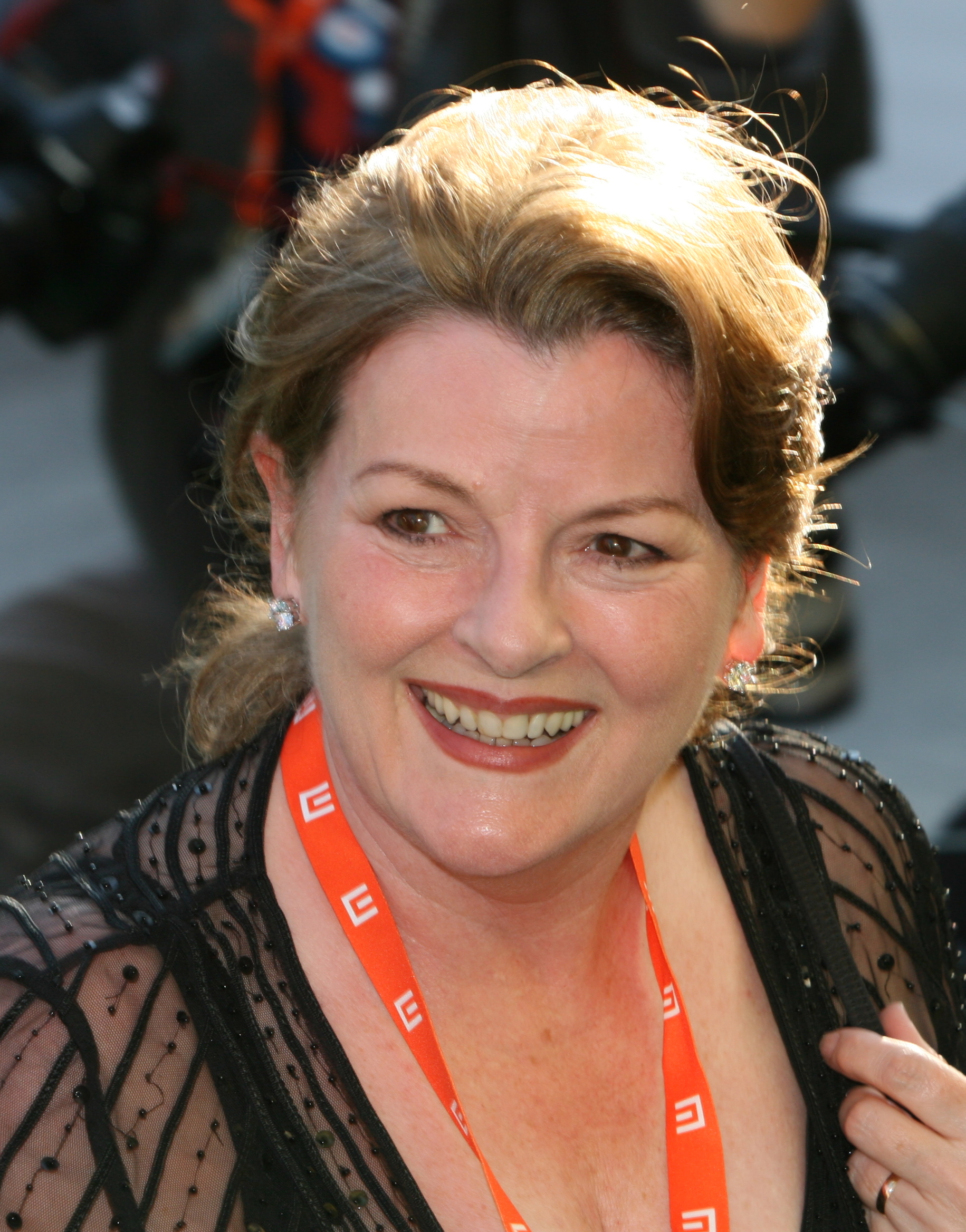
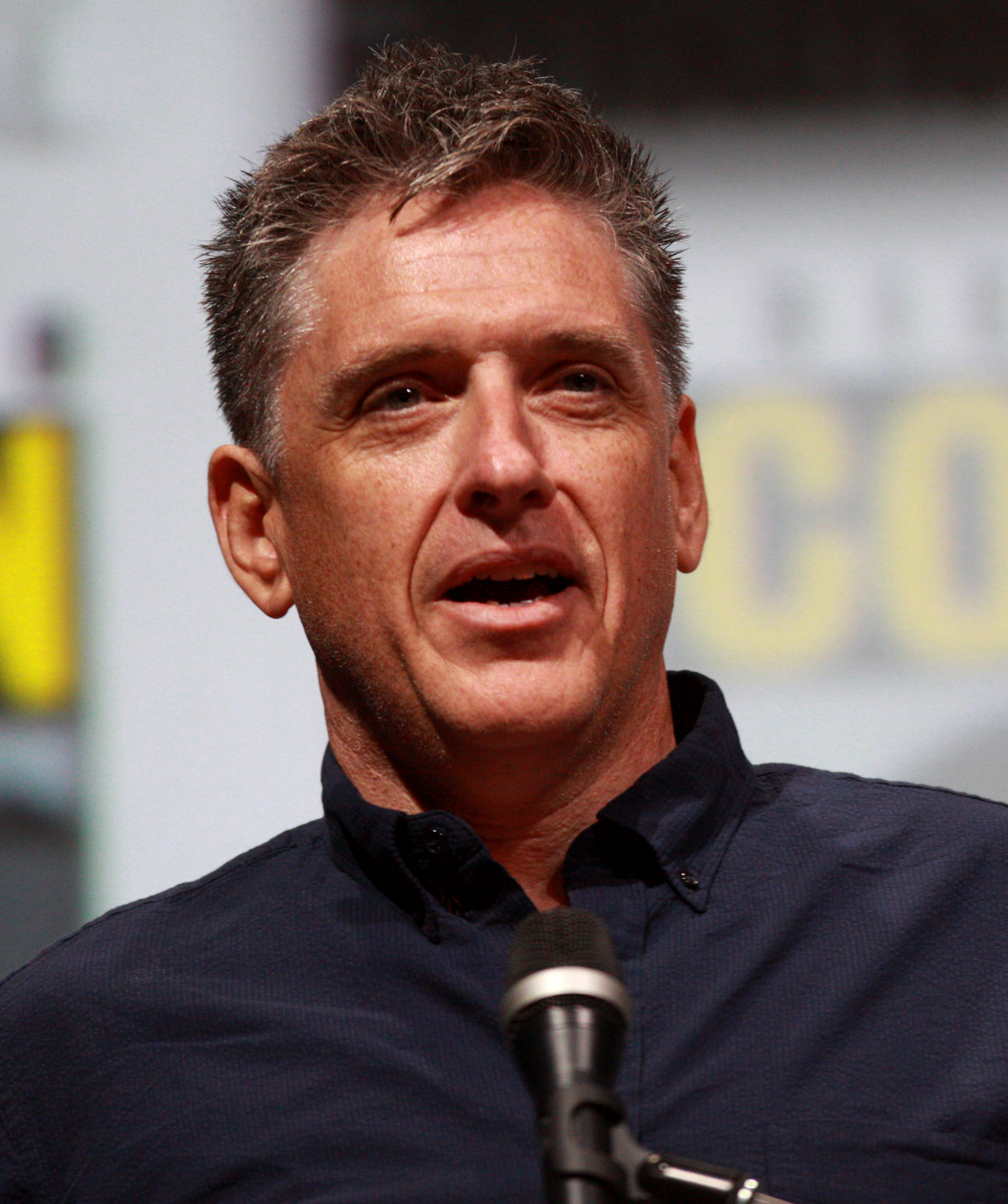
Top to bottom: Brenda Blethyn and Craig Ferguson star in the film as Grace Trevethyn and her gardener Matthew Stewart, respectively.
- Brenda Blethyn as Grace Trevethyn, a newly widowed middle-aged woman who is faced with the prospect of financial ruin and turns to growing cannabis under the tutelage of her gardener in order to save her family home. Blethyn, who was Ferguson's first choice, signed on the movie two years before shooting.
- Craig Ferguson as Matthew Stewart, Grace's gardener. Ferguson created the playful character with himself in mind. "I saw him as a decent chap who happens to like a bit of cannabis," Ferguson said. "He really cares about Grace and he wants to save her."
- Martin Clunes as Dr. Martin Bamford, a friend of Matthew. Martin Clunes’ character was spun off into a pair of films focusing on how he ended up in Cornwall. Later the character was renamed Dr. Martin Ellingham and underwent a complete personality change to become the sullen misanthrope that stars in the ITV television series Doc Martin, which states in its ending credits that the character was derived from the film Saving Grace.
- Valerie Edmond as Nicky, Matthew's frowning girlfriend. Edmond won the role of the village's fishing captain in a large open casting call.
- Tcheky Karyo as Jacques Chevalier
- Jamie Foreman as China MacFarlane, Jacques‘s bodyguard.
- Bill Bailey as Vince, Honey’s pot dealer.
- Diana Quick as Honey Chambers
- Tristan Sturrock as Harvey
- Phyllida Law as Margaret Sutton
- Linda Kerr Scott as Diana Skinner
- Leslie Phillips as Rev. Gerald Percy
- Denise Coffey as Mrs Hopkins
- Paul Brooke as Charlie
- Ken Campbell as Sgt. Alfred Mabely
- John Fortune as Melvyn (bank manager)
- Clive Merrison as Quentin Rhodes

== Production ==
According to Blethyn, Saving Grace was conceived after screenwriter Mark Crowdy had been "talking to somebody in Los Angeles and somebody mentioned apropos of nothing that really good cannabis was more valuable than gold, and he thought, oh, maybe that would make an interesting story." Crowdy was born and grew up in Cornwall, which inspired him to create a story that was set in the South West England county. Crowdy, who penned the script along with Craig Ferguson, approached Blethyn several years into writing.

=== Soundtrack ===
Saving Grace

Soundtrack album by Various Artists
- Released: 15 May 2000
- Label: WEA
- Producer: Mark Russell

| No. | Title | Length |
|---|---|---|
| 1. | "Introduction" (Mark Russell) | 1:02 |
| 2. | "Grace's Theme" (Mark Russell) | 2:42 |
| 3. | "Take a Picture" (Filter) | 5:55 |
| 4. | "Make Me Smile (Come Up and See Me)" (Steve Harley & Cockney Rebel) | 4:07 |
| 5. | "Spirit in the Sky" (Norman Greenbaum) | 3:56 |
| 6. | "Will You Give Me One?" (film dialogue) | 1:12 |
| 7. | "Sunshine at Last" (Koot) | 4:31 |
| 8. | "Grace in Notting Hill" (Mark Russell) | 2:57 |
| 9. | "Human (Tin Tin Out Mix)" (The Pretenders) | 3:52 |
| 10. | "Drugden" (Mark Russell) | 2:46 |
| 11. | "Might as Well Go Home" (Plenty) | 3:17 |
| 12. | "Would You Like Some Cornflakes?" (film dialogue) | 0:22 |
| 13. | "Wise Up (Car Port Mix)" (AFT) | 3:12 |
| 14. | "New B323" (film dialogue) | 0:41 |
| 15. | "Cornwall Chase" (Mark Russell) | 3:01 |
| 16. | "Accidental Angel" (Sherena Dugani) | 3:57 |
| 17. | "Witchcraft" (Robert Palmer) | 3:17 |
| 18. | "All Things Bright and Beautiful" (Mark Russell) | 2:51 |

== Reception ==
=== Commercial success ===
The film was released on 19 May 2000 in the United Kingdom and Ireland, where it grossed £3,000,000 during its theatrical run. Although it took only a tenth of simultaneously released Gladiator's box office haul, Saving Grace was considered a good showing in consideration of the film's low budget.

In the United States the film opened on 4 August 2000, where it soon emerged as a small box-office surprise during the slow-seasoned summer. Having originally opened at 30 screens, it was eventually showing on more than 870 screens during its most successful weeks in early September 2000, when Saving Grace averaged takings of $3,351 per theatre - more than blockbusters such as X-Men and Hollow Man. It eventually grossed $26,330,482 worldwide.

=== Critical response ===
The critical response to the film was mixed. The review aggregator website Rotten Tomatoes reported that 63% of critics gave the film a positive rating, based on 90 reviews, with an average score of 6/10. Its consensus states "the plot and basis for jokes are slight, but Saving Grace is indeed saved by some charming performances, most notably Brenda Blethyn's." On Metacritic, which uses a normalized rating system, the film holds a 62/100 rating, based on reviews from 32 critics, indicating "generally favourable reviews".

Jonathan Crow from AllMovie gave the film three out of five stars, calling it "wacky British comedy" with a "Waking Ned Devine (1998) meets Up in Smoke (1978)" effect. Peter Travers from Rolling Stone also called the film "a crowd-pleasing comedy in the tradition of The Full Monty and Waking Ned Devine." He wrote that "you know where this movie is going every step of the way. But Blethyn’s solid-gold charm turns Saving Grace into a comic high." Stephanie Zacharek, writing for Salon.com, called the film "a breezy and entertaining little charmer that works because it's not rendered on too precious a scale," and commented on Blethyn's performance: "She strikes the perfect tone, and her timing is right in the pocket."

Roger Ebert gave the film two stars out of four, stating that "the setup of Saving Grace is fun, and Blethyn helps by being not just a helpless innocent but a smart woman who depended too much on her husband and now quickly learns to cope." He criticised the film for its "more or less routine" ending: "We're left with a promising idea for a comedy, which arrives at some laughs but never finds its destination." A.O. Scott of The New York Times called the film "this summer's bait for the Anglophiles who keep shows like Mr. Bean and Keeping Up Appearances running on public television," which, to him, meant that the fact "that they're English and elderly apparently makes their antics screamingly funny to people who would turn up their noses at similar humour in a film like Scary Movie." In his review for San Francisco Chronicle Mick LaSalle wrote that "with Blethyn and Ferguson heading the cast, Saving Grace is hardly a contemptible effort, just a rote treatment of a tired subject."

=== Accolades ===
| Award | Category | Recipient(s) | Result | Ref. |
|---|---|---|---|---|
| ALFS Awards | Actress of the Year | Brenda Blethyn | Nominated | |
| British Academy Film Awards | Outstanding Debut by a British Writer, Director or Producer | Mark Crowdy | Nominated | |
| British Independent Film Awards | Best Film | Nigel Cole | Nominated | |
| British Independent Film Awards | Best Director | Nigel Cole | Nominated | |
| British Independent Film Awards | Best Actress | Brenda Blethyn | Nominated | |
| British Independent Film Awards | Best Screenplay | Mark Crowdy, Craig Ferguson | Nominated | |
| Empire Awards | Best British Actress | Brenda Blethyn | Nominated | |
| Golden Globe Award | Best Actress – Motion Picture Musical or Comedy | Brenda Blethyn | Nominated | |
| Munich Film Festival | High Hopes Award | Mark Crowdy | Won | |
| Norwegian International Film Festival | Audience Award | Nigel Cole | Won | |
| Satellite Awards | Best Actress – Motion Picture Musical or Comedy | Brenda Blethyn | Nominated | |
| Sundance Film Festival | World Cinema Audience Award | Nigel Cole | Won | |

== Spin-offs ==
After Saving Grace, two television films were made by BSkyB: "Doc Martin" and "The Legend of the Cloutie", in which viewers learn that Bamford, a successful obstetrician (played by Martin Clunes in each), finds that his wife has been carrying on extramarital affairs behind his back with his three best friends. After confronting her with the news, he decides to leave London and heads for Cornwall, which he remembers fondly from his youth. Shortly after he arrives, he gets involved in the mystery of the "Jellymaker" and, following the departure of the village's resident GP, decides to stay in Port Isaac and fill the gap himself.

Clunes' company tried selling a series on the same theme to ITV who liked it, but felt the character of Martin Bamford needed a stronger defining characteristic than just being a "townie" who is a little out of his depth in the country. ITV wanted the character to be more challenging, so the idea of the doctor being unusually ill-tempered was touted. Out of that idea a new series, also called Doc Martin, was born. Doc Martin was created for ITV in 2004 by Dominic Minghella; in the ITV series, the main character's surname was changed from Bamford to Ellingham, a deliberate anagram of the Minghella family name. The series became a huge success in the UK and internationally; the end titles state that the Doc Martin series' existence was "Arising from the Film Saving Grace Created by Craig Ferguson & Mark Crowdy".

=== Musical adaptation ===
In January 2022, musician KT Tunstall revealed during an interview with BBC that she has written a stage musical adaptation of Saving Grace while in lockdown due to the COVID-19 pandemic. The following month, it was announced that the stage version has begun private readings, having been adapted by April De Angelis from Craig Ferguson and Mark Crowdy's screenplay, scored by Tunstall, produced by Barney Wragg, and directed by Laurence Connor. Clair Burt will portray Grace while Ferguson will portray a "villainous banker" in a minor cameo role. The production would begin previews in West End in December 2022 before moving to a 2023 West End run.

In October 2022, the musical was confirmed to run for a limited twelve performances at Riverside Studios from 22 November until 4 December 2022 as an "intimate first run."
