= Yobai =

Discreet unmarried sex in Japanese tradition

Yobai (Japanese: 夜這い; "night crawling") was a Japanese custom of premarital sex usually practiced by young unmarried people. It was once common all over Japan and was practiced in some rural areas until the beginning of the Meiji era and even into the 20th century.

== Description ==
At night, young unmarried men silently entered houses with young unmarried women. A man would silently crawl into a woman's room and make his intentions known. If the woman consented, they would have sex. By the morning, he would leave. The girl's family might know about it but pretend they did not. It was common for young people to find a spouse like this.

According to ethnologist Akamatsu Keisuke, the practice varied from place to place. In some areas, any post-puberty woman, married or unmarried, could be visited by any post-puberty man, married or unmarried, from the village and even by men from other villages and travellers. In other places, only married women and widows could be visited, while single girls could not. And there were variations; for example, the "closed type" yobai was a custom in which only men from the same village had the right of visitation.

== See also ==
- Ngayap, practice by the Iban in Borneo
- Night hunting, nighttime courtship custom in Bhutan
