= Little Voice (film) =

1998 British film directed by Mark Herman

- Theatrical release poster
- Directed by: Mark Herman
- Written by: Mark Herman
- Based on: The Rise and Fall of Little Voice by Jim Cartwright
- Produced by: Elizabeth Karlsen
- Starring: Jane Horrocks; Michael Caine; Brenda Blethyn; Jim Broadbent; Ewan McGregor
- Cinematography: Andy Collins
- Edited by: Michael Ellis
- Music by: John Altman
- Production company: Scala Productions
- Distributed by: Miramax Films (through Buena Vista International)
- Release date: 4 December 1998
- Running time: 96 minutes
- Country: United Kingdom
- Language: English
- Budget: $7 million
- Box office: $4.6 million

Little Voice is a 1998 British musical film written and directed by Mark Herman and made in Scarborough, North Yorkshire. The film starred Jane Horrocks, Michael Caine, Brenda Blethyn, Jim Broadbent and Ewan McGregor.

The screenplay is based on Jim Cartwright's 1992 play The Rise and Fall of Little Voice.

== Plot ==
Laura Hoff, an only child, is a reclusive young woman who lives with her mother, Mari, in a working-class home in Scarborough, Yorkshire, England. She is known as LV (short for Little Voice) because of her soft, shy, and childlike speaking voice. She flees reality, hiding away in her bedroom, listening to records and impersonating the voices of American and British artists such as Marilyn Monroe, Gracie Fields, Judy Garland, and Shirley Bassey; her love of songs is her only source of strength since her beloved father's death. Her mother, by contrast, is a loud and promiscuous woman with little sympathy for LV's retiring nature or her grief.

Billy, a shy and awkward telephone engineer who raises homing pigeons, meets and begins to bond with LV when he installs a new telephone line in Mari's apartment. Their quiet romance is interrupted when Mari brings home Ray Say, a down and out talent agent. Ray, on the lookout for an act to carry him to fame and fortune, hears LV's impressions and recognizes her gift. He vows to make her a star despite LV's reluctance to step onstage. Although Mari remains dismissive of LV's skills, she is infatuated with Ray and goes along to win his approval. Ray arranges for LV to sing at a club owned by local impresario Mr. Boo, but her performance is a failure as she is overcome by stage fright and only sings a few lines after Ray turns off the stagelights. Ray sees that LV needs encouragement on stage and works with Mr. Boo to organize a big band, lights, and a new dress to give her confidence, selling his car and taking out a loan from a local mobster to pay for the concert.

Ray gives her a pep talk, manipulating her into performing by portraying her act as a tribute to her father. LV agrees to sing again, but only as a one-off. LV envisions her father sitting in the club as she performs; she brings the house down and is a storming success. Ray spots a talent scout for a London agent in the audience and later persuades the agent to come the following night to see LV perform. As Ray, Mari and Mr. Boo toast their future success, LV murmurs that she agreed to sing only one time and slumps to the floor.

The following night, LV catatonically remains in her bed. She ignores Mari's attempts to shame her into performing, and when Ray tries to first cajole than threaten her, she uses her impressions to scare him away. Ray, furious at losing his meal ticket, lashes cruelly out at Mari and storms away. At the cabaret club, the London agent finally loses patience after several third-rate acts fill the time in LV's absence and leaves. Ray storms into the club, grabs the mic and sings "It's Over" in a furious, profanity-laden tirade, as his career disappears before everyone's eyes, while the loan shark arrives to demand his money back.

Meanwhile, the faulty electrical wiring at LV's home starts a fire, trapping LV in her upstairs room, where she is rescued by Billy. When she returns home, she discovers Mari has destroyed her father's records in revenge. In a final showdown with her mother, after being wrongly accused by her mother of arson, LV responds by screaming in her mother's face. Blaming her for her father's death and blaming her own meek nature on Mari's domineering attitude, she walks away saying her name isn't Little Voice, it's Laura. Freeing herself from others' control, she joins Billy to care for his pigeons and watch the sun rise.

== Cast ==
- Brenda Blethyn as Mari
- Michael Caine as Ray Say
- Jim Broadbent as Mr. Boo
- Ewan McGregor as Billy
- Jane Horrocks as LV (Little Voice / Laura)
- Annette Badland as Sadie
- Philip Jackson as George
- Alex Norton as Bunnie Morris

In addition, Graham Turner portrays LV’s father, in photos and in her imagination.

== Reception ==
=== Critical response ===
Rotten Tomatoes gives the film an 80% rating based on 50 reviews with the consensus: "Little Voice brings its award-winning source material to the screen in style, elevated by a commanding lead performance from Jane Horrocks." Metacritic, which uses a weighted average, assigned the film a score of 69 out of 100, based on 25 critics, indicating "generally favorable" reviews.

Janet Maslin wrote in her New York Times review, "Horrocks's phenomenal mimicry of musical grande dames from Marlene Dietrich to Marilyn Monroe, lavishing special loving care on Judy Garland, makes a splendid centerpiece for the otherwise more ordinary film built around it."

Roger Ebert of the Chicago Sun-Times felt the story was "amusing but uneven" and that the film "seems to have all the pieces in place for another one of those whimsical, comic British slices of life. But the movie doesn't quite deliver the way we think it will. One problem is that the Michael Caine character, sympathetic and funny in the opening and middle scenes, turns mean at the end for no good reason. Another is that the romance, and a manufactured crisis, distract from the true climax of the movie. That would be Jane Horrocks' vocal performance ... she is amazing. Absolutely fabulous."

In Variety, Derek Elley called the film "a small picture with a big heart", adding, "The film has almost everything going for it, with the exceptions of a somewhat lopsided structure in which the climax comes two-thirds of the way through and a romantic subplot that plays like an afterthought. Nevertheless, smooth direction by Mark Herman and juicy performances by a host of Brit character actors ... ensure an entertaining ride ... Horrocks, whose combo of gamin physique and big vocal talent make the title role seem unthinkable for any other actress, is a revelation, handling moments of solo emotion and onstage strutting with equal, moving panache."

=== Accolades ===
Award	Category	Recipient(s)	Result
Academy Awards	Best Supporting Actress	Brenda Blethyn	Nominated
Boston Society of Film Critics Awards	Best Actress	Jane Horrocks	3rd Place
British Academy Film Awards	Outstanding British Film	Elizabeth Karlsen and Mark Herman	Nominated
British Academy Film Awards	Best Actor in a Leading Role	Michael Caine	Nominated
British Academy Film Awards	Best Actress in a Leading Role	Jane Horrocks	Nominated
British Academy Film Awards	Best Actress in a Supporting Role	Brenda Blethyn	Nominated
British Academy Film Awards	Best Adapted Screenplay	Mark Herman	Nominated
British Academy Film Awards	Best Sound	Peter Lindsay, Rodney Glenn, Ray Merrin and Graham Daniel	Nominated
British Independent Film Awards	Best Actor	Michael Caine	Nominated
British Independent Film Awards	Best Actress	Jane Horrocks	Nominated
Chicago Film Critics Association Awards	Best Actress	Jane Horrocks	Nominated
Chicago Film Critics Association Awards	Best Supporting Actor	Michael Caine	Nominated
Emden International Film Festival	Emden Film Award	Mark Herman	Nominated
Golden Globe Awards	Best Actor in a Motion Picture – Musical or Comedy	Michael Caine	Won
Golden Globe Awards	Best Actress in a Motion Picture – Musical or Comedy	Jane Horrocks	Nominated
Golden Globe Awards	Best Supporting Actress – Motion Picture	Brenda Blethyn	Nominated
Golden Reel Awards	Best Sound Editing – Music – Musical Feature (Foreign & Domestic)	Andy Glen	Nominated
London Film Critics Circle Awards	British Supporting Actor of the Year	Michael Caine	Won
Online Film & Television Association Awards	Best Comedy/Musical Actor	Michael Caine	Nominated
Online Film & Television Association Awards	Best Actress	Jane Horrocks	Nominated
Online Film & Television Association Awards	Best Comedy/Musical Actress	Jane Horrocks	Nominated
Online Film & Television Association Awards	Best Adapted Song	"I Wanna Be Loved by You"; Music by Herbert Stothart and Harry Ruby; Lyrics by Bert Kalmar; Performed by Jane Horrocks	Won
Online Film & Television Association Awards	Best Comedy/Musical Ensemble		Nominated
Satellite Awards	Best Motion Picture – Musical or Comedy		Nominated
Satellite Awards	Best Actor in a Motion Picture – Musical or Comedy	Michael Caine	Nominated
Satellite Awards	Best Actress in a Motion Picture – Musical or Comedy	Jane Horrocks	Nominated
Satellite Awards	Best Actress in a Supporting Role in a Motion Picture – Musical or Comedy	Brenda Blethyn	Nominated
Satellite Awards	Best Adapted Screenplay	Mark Herman	Nominated
Screen Actors Guild Awards	Outstanding Performance by a Cast in a Motion Picture	Annette Badland, Brenda Blethyn, Jim Broadbent, Michael Caine, Jane Horrocks, Philip Jackson and Ewan McGregor	Nominated
Screen Actors Guild Awards	Outstanding Performance by a Female Actor in a Leading Role	Jane Horrocks	Nominated
Screen Actors Guild Awards	Outstanding Performance by a Female Actor in a Supporting Role	Brenda Blethyn	Nominated
Southeastern Film Critics Association Awards	Best Actress	Jane Horrocks	Runner-up

== Soundtrack ==
The following songs are performed by Horrocks:

- "The Man that Got Away" by Harold Arlen and Ira Gershwin
- "Lover Man (Oh Where Can You Be)" by Jimmy Davis, Jimmy Shern, and Roger Ramirez
- "Over the Rainbow" by Harold Arlen and E. Y. Harburg
- "Chicago" by Fred Fisher
- "Big Spender" by Cy Coleman and Dorothy Fields
- "I Wanna Be Loved By You" by Harry Ruby, Herbert Stothart, and Bert Kalmar
- "Sing As We Go" by Harry Parr Davies
- "Falling in Love Again" by Frederick Hollander and Samuel Lerner
- "Get Happy" by Harold Arlen and Ted Koehler

The film also features Michael Caine singing "It's Over", as performed by Roy Orbison.
