= Ngayap =

Borneo courting practice

Ngayap (English: "wing") is a traditional courting practice that was historically observed within the Iban community of Borneo. This custom involves nocturnal visits by young men to the residences of unmarried women with the intent of initiating romantic relationships.

The purpose of Ngayap was to provide the opportunity between unmarried men and women to express their feelings towards each other so they could be potentially married. Though this practice was socially accepted in the past, it is currently faded in modern times to prevent slanderous allegations against Iban culture.

According to Iban customary law, a man is permitted to visit a woman for a maximum of three consecutive nights. If he exceed the limit, the woman's parents were entitled to question his intentions in courting her. Should the man express a desire to marry the woman, he was expected to declare his intention. In a case where the man continues to visit the woman without any clear decision, the woman's family has the authority to detain him, arrange a marriage, and then bring the matter to the attention of the Tuai Rumah (Iban longhouse chief) and whole longhouse community.

In the modern times, the practice of Ngayap is no longer practised. This is due to the fact that courtship could be developed during gatherings such as festivals, schools, institutions of higher learning, and workplaces. As the practice is susceptible to misinterpretation or misuse, it is generally confined to the cultural domain of the Iban community. Legal action, as stipulated in Section 132 of the Adat Iban of 1993, can be taken only in cases of violations or interference by others in this practice.

== See also ==
- Yobai, nighttime courtship custom in Japan
- Night hunting, similar courtship custom in Bhutan
- The Sleeping Dictionary (2003 movie) - based on this custom.
