= Paul Andrew Williams =

British film writer and director (born 1973)

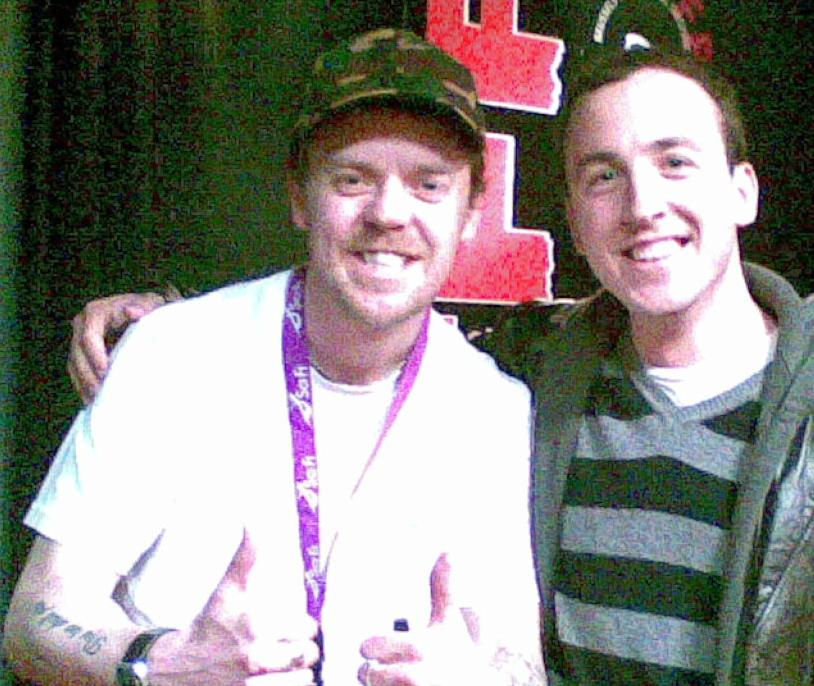
Paul Andrew Williams at 26th BIFFF (Brussels) in March 2008

Paul Andrew Williams (born 1973 in Portsmouth, England) is a British film writer and director. He won the New Director's Award for his film London to Brighton in the 2006 Edinburgh International Film Festival.

== Career ==
Williams began his career as an actor but later wrote and directed pop-promos, viral ads and short films. In 2001 he wrote and directed the short film Royalty which inspired London to Brighton. Royalty premiered at the London Film Festival in 2001, was shown UK television, was shortlisted for the Kodak showcase, and later screened at BAFTA. In 2003 Williams was the only UK-based director to be picked up by the Fox Searchlight Director's Lab. His short film, It's Okay to Drink Whiskey, made through this programme, premiered at 2004's Sundance Film Festival. His UK TV debut, Naked, was pick of the day in Time Out magazine.

Through a new development slate between Pathe and BBC Films, Williams was hired to write The Choir. Williams wrote and directed the psychological thriller Cherry Tree Lane, which premiered as part of the Fright Fest.

== Filmography ==
=== Film ===
Year	Title	Director	Writer	Producer	Actor
2001	Royalty	Yes	Yes	No	No
2002	It's Okay to Drink Whiskey	Yes	Yes	No	No
2003	Coming Up – Naked	Yes	No	No	No
2006	London to Brighton	Yes	Yes	Yes	Yes
2008	The Cottage	Yes	Yes	No	No
2008	The Children	No	Yes	No	No
2010	Cherry Tree Lane	Yes	Yes	No	No
2012	Song for Marion	Yes	Yes	No	No
2014	Murdered by My Boyfriend	Yes	No	No	No
2015	The Eichmann Show	Yes	No	No	No
2017	Broadchurch	Yes	No	No	No
2017	Murdered for Being Different	Yes	No	No	No
2021	Bull	Yes	Yes	No	No
2025	Cleaner	No	Yes	No	No
2025	Dragonfly	Yes	Yes	Yes	No
2026	Faith	Yes	Yes	No	No
