= Bomena =

Bhutanese courtship custom

"Night hunting", known in Bhutan as Bomena, is a traditional courtship custom that is practiced in some parts of Bhutan. Similar customs have also existed in other cultures, such as yobai in Japan.

== In literature ==
In the book “Love, Courtship and Marriage in Rural Bhutan” by Kyle Bauer, the Centre for Bhutan Studies, discusses night hunting. According to the author, Bomena, a “custom whereby a boy stealthily enters a girl’s house at night for courtship or coitus with or without prior consultation”, is commonly misunderstood in Bhutan as ‘night hunting’. The use of a vernacular word Bomena, not ‘night hunting’, a term loaded with ethnocentrism and ignorance of the custom, tells a lot of this original village ethnography.

The current discourse and understanding of Bomena, according to the author, are naïve, biased and misrepresented, heavily influenced by changing values especially among the urban societies. One common notion is that any rural culture is ‘inferior’ and all urban cultures are ‘superior’, and replacing the rural culture with urban culture is seen as a way of emancipating the Bhutanese farmers from their ‘primitive’ culture and advancing the country.

== See also ==
- Ngayap, practice by the Iban in Borneo
- Yobai, Japan
