= London Film Critics Circle Awards 2000 =

British film awards ceremony

21st London Film Critics Circle Awards

15 February 2001

Film of the Year:
Being John Malkovich

British Film of the Year:
Billy Elliot

The 21st London Film Critics Circle Awards, honouring the best in film for 2000, were announced by the London Film Critics Circle on 15 February 2001.

== Winners and nominees ==
=== Film of the Year ===
Being John Malkovich

- Crouching Tiger, Hidden Dragon
- Gladiator
- Memento
- O Brother, Where Art Thou?

=== British Film of the Year ===
Billy Elliot

- Chicken Run
- The End of the Affair
- The House of Mirth
- Topsy-Turvy

=== Foreign Language Film of the Year ===
Crouching Tiger, Hidden Dragon • Taiwan/Hong Kong/United States/China

- Beau Travail • France
- The Color of Paradise • Iran
- Harry, He's Here to Help • France
- In the Mood for Love • Hong Kong

=== Director of the Year ===
Spike Jonze – Being John Malkovich

- Mary Harron – American Psycho
- Philip Kaufman – Quills
- Ang Lee – Crouching Tiger, Hidden Dragon
- Steven Soderbergh – Erin Brockovich

=== British Director of the Year ===
Stephen Daldry – Billy Elliot

- Terence Davies – The House of Mirth
- Mike Leigh – Topsy-Turvy
- Christopher Nolan – Memento
- Ridley Scott – Gladiator

=== Screenwriter of the Year ===
Charlie Kaufman – Being John Malkovich

- Cameron Crowe – Almost Famous
- Paul Thomas Anderson – Magnolia
- Joel Coen & Ethan Coen – O Brother, Where Art Thou?
- Steve Kloves – Wonder Boys

=== British Screenwriter of the Year ===
Christopher Nolan – Memento

- Lee Hall – Billy Elliot
- Neil Jordan – The End of the Affair
- Anthony Minghella – The Talented Mr. Ripley
- Mike Leigh – Topsy-Turvy

=== Actor of the Year ===
Russell Crowe – Gladiator and The Insider

- Jim Carrey- How the Grinch Stole Christmas and Man on the Moon
- John Cusack – Being John Malkovich
- Michael Douglas – Wonder Boys
- Philip Seymour Hoffman – Almost Famous and Flawless

=== Actress of the Year ===
Julia Roberts – Erin Brockovich

- Gillian Anderson – The House of Mirth
- Julianne Moore – The End of the Affair
- Hilary Swank – Boys Don't Cry
- Renée Zellweger – Nurse Betty

=== British Actor of the Year ===
Jim Broadbent – Topsy-Turvy

- Christian Bale – American Psycho
- Ralph Fiennes – The End of the Affair
- Anthony Hopkins – Titus
- Gary Lewis – Billy Elliot

=== British Actress of the Year ===
Julie Walters – Billy Elliot

- Brenda Blethyn – Saving Grace
- Janet McTeer – Tumbleweeds
- Emily Watson – The Luzhin Defence
- Kate Winslet – Quills

=== British Supporting Actor of the Year ===
Albert Finney – Erin Brockovich

- Michael Caine – Quills
- Jason Isaacs – The Patriot
- Jude Law – The Talented Mr. Ripley
- Timothy Spall – Topsy-Turvy

=== British Supporting Actress of the Year ===
Samantha Morton – Sweet and Lowdown

- Shirley Henderson- Topsy-Turvy
- Lesley Manville – Topsy-Turvy
- Sophie Thompson – Relative Values
- Emily Watson – Cradle Will Rock

=== British Newcomer of the Year ===
Jamie Bell – Billy Elliot

- Paul Bettany – Gangster No. 1
- Stephen Daldry – Billy Elliot
- Lee Hall – Billy Elliot
- Michael Legge – Angela's Ashes

=== British Producer of the Year ===
Greg Brenman and Jonathan Finn – Billy Elliot

- Peter Lord, Nick Park, David Sproxton – Chicken Run
- Norma Heyman – Gangster No. 1
- Olivia Stewart – The House of Mirth
- Simon Channing-Williams – Topsy-Turvy

=== Dilys Powell Award ===
- Richard Harris
