= My Angel (2011 film) =

- Theatrical poster
- Directed by: Stephen Cookson
- Written by: Stephen Cookson
- Produced by: Stephen Cookson, Peter Keegan
- Starring: Joseph Phillips; Timothy Spall; Brenda Blethyn; Celia Imrie; Mel Smith
- Cinematography: Ollie Downey
- Edited by: Rupert Hall
- Music by: Vince Pope
- Distributed by: New Horizon Films & BBC Home Entertainment
- Release date: 9 December 2011 (Monaco International Film Festival)
- Language: English

My Angel is a 2011 British Christmas film written, directed and produced by Stephen Cookson. Starring Timothy Spall, Brenda Blethyn, Celia Imrie, Mel Smith and introducing Joseph Phillips, it tells the story of a boy, played by Phillips, looking for an angel to save his mother after an accident. Shot in Northwood for less than £2 million, My Angel scooped best film, newcomer, director, producer, screenplay, plus best actor and actress for Blethyn and Spall at the Monaco International Film Festival. Re-titled as Christmas Angel and released on DVD in the UK on 4 November 2013. Released in the US by BBC Home Entertainment on 19 November 2013.

== Plot ==
Fifteen-year-old Eddie (Joseph Phillips) is on a shopping trip with his mother when she is tragically struck by a car and left in critical condition. With their father absent from their lives, Eddie and his brother Stewart (Angus Harrison) face the daunting prospect of potentially losing their mother just as Christmas approaches. One night, Eddie's mother visits him in a dream urging him to find a halo so that she may be saved. Stewart scoffs at Eddie's "childish" dream and the only person Eddie can turn to is the grumpy Mr Lambert (Spall), from his school. Will Eddie be able to find an angel and save his mother before Christmas?

== Cast ==
- Joseph Phillips — Eddie
- Brenda Blethyn — Headmistress
- Timothy Spall — Mr Lambert
- Mel Smith — Uncle Richard
- Celia Imrie — The Librarian
- Angus Harrison — Stewart

== Reception ==
=== Accolades ===
List of awards and nominations
Award	Category	Recipients and nominees	Result
Angel Film Awards	Best Feature Film	Stephen Cookson	Won
Angel Film Awards	Best Actor	Timothy Spall	Won
Angel Film Awards	Best Actress	Brenda Blethyn	Won
Angel Film Awards	Best Director	Stephen Cookson	Won
Angel Film Awards	Best Newcomer	Joseph Phillips	Won
Angel Film Awards	Best Producer, Feature Film	Peter Keegan	Won
Angel Film Awards	Best Script	Stephen Cookson	Won
