= The Sleeping Dictionary =

2003 film by Guy Jenkin

- Theatrical release poster
- Directed by: Guy Jenkin
- Written by: Guy Jenkin
- Produced by: Simon Bosanquet; Jimmy Mulville; Denise O'Donoghue
- Starring: Hugh Dancy; Jessica Alba; Brenda Blethyn; Emily Mortimer; Bob Hoskins; Noah Taylor
- Cinematography: Martin Fuhrer
- Edited by: Lesley Walker
- Music by: Simon Boswell
- Production companies: Hat Trick Films; Katira Productions GmbH & Co. KG
- Distributed by: Entertainment in Video (United Kingdom); Fine Line Features (United States)
- Release dates: January 31, 2003 (Mexico); February 18, 2003 (USA)
- Running time: 109 minutes
- Countries: United Kingdom; United States
- Language: English
- Budget: $12 million

The Sleeping Dictionary is a 2003 British-American romantic drama film written and directed by Guy Jenkin and starring Hugh Dancy, Jessica Alba, Brenda Blethyn, Emily Mortimer, and Bob Hoskins. The film is about a young Englishman who is sent to Sarawak, Malaysia, in the 1930s to become part of the British colonial government. There he encounters some unorthodox local traditions, and finds himself faced with tough decisions of the heart involving a beautiful young local woman who becomes the object of his affections. The Sleeping Dictionary was filmed on location in Sarawak.

== Plot ==
A young and naive Englishman, John Truscott (Hugh Dancy), goes to the British protectorate of Sarawak, Borneo (described as a "colony" in the film), to try to apply his father's work to the Iban society. There he meets his boss Henry Bullard (Bob Hoskins) and his wife Aggie Bullard (Brenda Blethyn). John tries to civilize the area, building schools and providing education for the Iban people, and encounters unfamiliar local customs. A girl, Selima (Jessica Alba), becomes his "sleeping dictionary", who sleeps with him and teaches him the language and the habits of the locals.

John is sent upriver where a sickness is affecting the Yakata tribe. He and Selima travel inland. John witnesses a nearby mining operation run by Europeans. He notices that the Yakata have rice – which has been given to them by the miners – and he guesses correctly that the miners have poisoned the rice in order to get rid of the Yakata. Knowing that they will exact vengeance, John tells the Yakata what has happened. The Yakata wipe out the miners.

Despite their intent, John and Selima find themselves falling into a forbidden love. John is eager to marry Selima despite the longhouse not allowing it. When John tells Henry about his plans to marry her, they lock Selima up. Selima agrees to marry in the longhouse before they part ways. Bullard threatens to send John to trial for the death of the European miners. He makes a deal with John. John has to give up Selima, and go to Britain for a year's vacation and to meet the Bullards' daughter Cecilia (Emily Mortimer). Another local British official, Neville Shipperly (Noah Taylor), a boorish drunk and a man who despises the locals, is jealous of John because he had planned to win Cecilia as his own.

A year later, John is seen marrying Cecilia. He still struggles to get over his past with his sleeping dictionary. With Cecilia, he decides the best thing to do is go back to Sarawak to continue his work there. In Sarawak, Cecilia notices John's desire for Selima despite constantly keeping his distance from her. Cecilia demands to know more about Selima; John replies that she is married to Belansai and that the couple have a baby together.

While at the lake collecting rocks for research, John sees Selima with her baby. He believes the child to be his and asks Famous to arrange a meeting with the pair. Back at the house, Selima walks in, unaware that John is there. Here, John meets his son Mandar for the first time. When Belansai hears news that John is spending time with his wife, he sneaks in to try to kill John but only manages to hurt him with a razor. The next morning, Henry reveals to John his past about his own 'sleeping dictionary', which resulted in the birth of another child: Selima. Belansai is caught and sentenced to be hanged for trying to kill an officer. Selima is not happy, as Belansai has been a good father to Mandar. Not wanting his friend Belansai to die, John nevertheless goes through with announcing Belansai's hanging, having no other option. Later that night, Selima goes to help Belansai escape, not knowing that John is already there, breaking Belansai out and handing him a gun. As Belansai hurries off, John turns to Selima, asking to meet him at the dock so they can escape on the boat. When Selima expresses fear that he will be caught, he says "Then I'll tell them I'd rather have you than a country... or a language... or a history". They embrace as the rain is pouring behind them.

The next day, since the people of the Longhouse have turned on Selima, she is forced to become the sleeping dictionary for Neville. Later Cecilia announces she is pregnant, shocking John. That night, Selima bashes Neville on the head, knocking him out, because he has attempted to attack her and force her. She grabs the baby and runs from the house, heading for the docks. John still has plans to be with Selima and their son, and, as he begins writing a note, is stopped by Cecilia. The couple then talk about John's love for Selima and how Cecilia wants John to be happy. Aggie is not happy that Cecilia and Henry have allowed both John and Selima to run away together because she never left Henry's sight, fearing he'd go with his sleeping dictionary. She encourages Neville to go after them.

With the help of Famous and the Yakata, John searches for Selima as she's left believing that John didn't come to the place of arrangement. They reunite as Neville comes through with a gun. He tells them to cuff themselves around the bamboos and tells them of his plans to kill John, Selima and their baby. They're then rescued by the Yakata, who kill Neville.

At the end, they decide to live together and migrate with the Yakata.

== Cast ==
- Hugh Dancy as John Truscott
- Jessica Alba as Selima
- Brenda Blethyn as Aggie Bullard
- Emily Mortimer as Cecilia Bullard
- Bob Hoskins as Henry Bullard
- Noah Taylor as Neville Shipperly
- Christopher Ling Lee Ian as Jasmine
- Junix Inocian as Famous
- Michael Jessing Langgi as Melaka
- Mano Maniam as Policeman
- K.K. Moggie as Tipong
- Cicilia Anak Richard as Jester Woman
- Malcolm Rogers as Vicar
- Eugene Salleh as Belansai
- Kate Helen White as Mandar
- Prang as Famous Monkey

== Production ==
=== Screenplay ===
Guy Jenkins, the writer and director, mentioned that he created the screenplay after a back-packing trip he made to Borneo in the early 1980s and became enamoured of the concept of ngayap which was the Iban way of courtship practised in the early 1920s and '30s. He combined the story with the romanticised idea of young Britons being posted to jungle outposts and being "thrown in the deep end" when they had to learn the local language in express time. And so a human "sleeping dictionary" was allocated to each of them.

=== Filming locations ===
The Sleeping Dictionary was filmed on various locations in Sarawak, Malaysia. A longhouse was specially constructed at great expense (RM125,000) at Batang Ai, about 15 minutes drive on the secondary road to the Hilton Batang Ai Resort, where the film cast and crew were based for 10 days. Locations in Kuching included the Matang Recreation Park; Buntal fishing village and many smaller villages and country homesteads. The local crew and cast numbered up to 600 on certain days, for a few crowd scenes.

=== Production companies ===
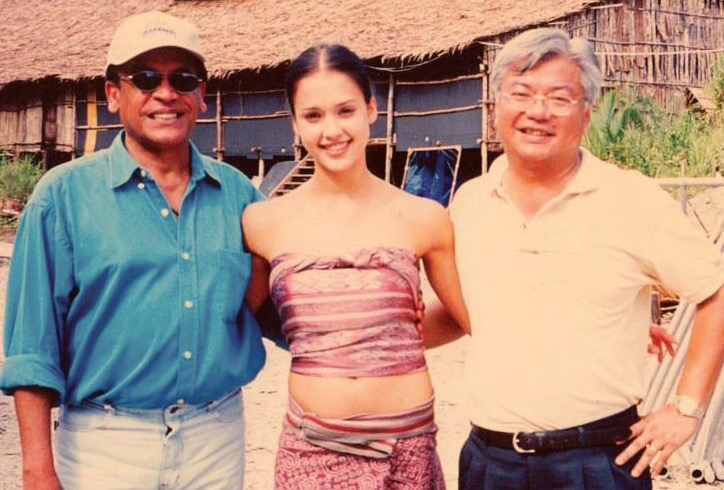
Jessica Alba with Chandran Rutnam and Edgar Ong in Sarawak during the shooting

The local Malaysian film production company for this feature was Southeast Asia Film Locations Services, whose Sri Lankan partner Chandran Rutnam had brought Steven Spielberg to Colombo to shoot Indiana Jones and the Temple of Doom. His Malaysian partner Edgar Ong was involved in the first major Hollywood feature made in Sarawak, Farewell to the King, in 1987. He later produced Sacred Planet for Disney/IMAX which was narrated by Robert Redford.

== Historical background and inaccuracies ==
This film was set when the third British White Rajah, Charles Vyner Brooke, was on the throne in Sarawak. Sarawak was a British Protectorate at this time, not a British colony as stated in the film. Sarawak became a British Colony after the Second World War when the Third Rajah abdicated.

The fictitious story about the Iban custom of women serving as a "sleeping dictionary" (Malay: kamus tidur) is loosely based on the Iban courtship tradition called Ngayap (English: "wing").

== Release ==
A few countries received a theatrical release of the movie, including Thailand, Indonesia, Canada, Japan and parts of Europe and the Americas. Elsewhere, including the United Kingdom, it was released direct-to-video, where it was awarded the first-time ever DVD Award (for direct-to-DVD films only) for Best Actor (Bob Hoskins). Hoskins was not the first choice, as both Michael Caine and then Tom Wilkinson had turned down the role.
