= Edward Mathers =

Edward Mathers may refer to:

- Edward Powys Mathers, English translator and poet
- Edward Peter Mathers, his father, British author, editor, and newspaper proprietor
