= John Finnemore's Double Acts =

Series of radio comedy programmes written by John Finnemore

John Finnemore's Double Acts is a series of radio comedy programmes, written by John Finnemore. It is an anthology series of largely unconnected two-handers.

The first series of six episodes was broadcast on Radio 4 in October and November 2015. A second series of six episodes was broadcast in May, June and July 2017. The series' working title was The John Finnemore Project.

The programme was produced and directed by David Tyler.

== Format ==
Each episode features only two main speaking parts, apart from Finnemore himself who acts as announcer. Additional, uncredited voices are sometimes heard briefly. Each episode is a self-contained play, though four in the first series are loosely connected by incidental details, mainly revolving around references to a fictional bath manufacturer called Willard & Son: "A Flock of Tigers", which is set in 1934, features the character Edmund Willard - the current head of the Willard & Son family business - while "Wysinnwyg", "Hot Desk" and "Red-Handed" all involve characters who work for the company in the present day. Both "Red Handed" (which takes place over half an hour in real time) and "Hot Desk" (which takes place over a few weeks) are implied to take place within the time frame of "Wysinnwyg" (which covers several months), and contain callbacks to each other in the form of references to characters appearing in the others. John Finnemore's Souvenir Programme has also featured a sketch in which Yvonne, a character mentioned in "The Rebel Alliance", who is only audible occasionally in the background, actually gives her wedding toast.

== Awards ==
The episode "A Flock of Tigers" was shortlisted for Best Scripted Comedy Drama in the BBC Audio Drama Awards 2016. The episode "English for Pony Lovers" won the Writers Guild of Great Britain Award for Best Comedy in January 2017. "Penguin Diplomacy" received a commendation for Best Audio Drama Script at the 2018 BBC Audio Drama Awards.

== Episode list ==
=== Series one ===
No. overall	No. in series	Title	Original release date
1	1	"A Flock of Tigers"	16 October 2015
On a train in 1934, Edmund – a father who is unable to use his imagination – is helped to do so by Dolorosa. Cast: Celia Imrie (Dolorosa) and Charles Edwards (Edmund).
2	2	"Wysinnwyg"	23 October 2015
In the Sales Support Department of Willard & Son Bath Suppliers, new staff member Kerry meets an obstinate boss, Adele, whom she must deal with in order to climb up the corporate ladder. Cast: Alison Steadman (Adele) and Isy Suttie (Kerry).
3	3	"Red-Handed"	30 October 2015
Joel comes home early from work one day to find Henry, an older man, robbing him. Cast: John Bird (Henry) and Lawry Lewin (Joel).
4	4	"The Goliath Window"	6 November 2015
In 1820, in the vestry of St Anne's church in the village of Mayton Chennett, Luke is attempting to use Mark as a model for a stained glass window of David and Goliath. Cast: John Finnemore (Luke) and Simon Kane (Mark).
5	5	"English for Pony-Lovers"	13 November 2015
In a small town in Germany, Lorna attempts to give Elke an English lesson. Cast: Rebecca Front (Elke) and Beth Mullen (Lorna).
6	6	"Hot Desk"	20 November 2015
At Willard & Son Bath Suppliers, at precisely seven in the morning and seven in the evening, receptionist Griselda and security guard Mike meet to swap ownership of a desk each day, and this blossoms into an unusual relationship. Cast: Mathew Baynton (Mike) and Jenny Bede (Griselda).

=== Series two ===
The fifth episode, Here's What We Do, was originally intended to be the third episode, but was pushed back two weeks 'due to circumstances beyond anyone's control'. As a result, The Rebel Alliance and Penguin Diplomacy were each pushed forward one week. The episodes appear in the original order on the CD and Audible release.

No. overall	No. in series	Title	Original release date
7	1	"The Queen's Speech"	31 May 2017
At Osborne House on the Isle of Wight, the widowed Queen Victoria is introduced to Mabel, who brings with her a machine for recording sound. Cast: Stephanie Cole (Queen Victoria) and Kerry Godliman (Mabel).
8	2	"Mercy Dash"	7 June 2017
When Malcolm asks Sue for some money to get to Winchester to visit a family member in hospital, he doesn't expect her to drive him there herself. Cast: Julia McKenzie (Sue) and Gus Brown (Malcolm).
9	3	"The Rebel Alliance"	21 June 2017
Eileen and Lizzie, seated together at a wedding, plot to upstage the wedding's organizer, Yvonne, during the reception. Cast: Una Stubbs (Eileen) and Tamzin Outhwaite (Lizzie).
10	4	"Penguin Diplomacy"	28 June 2017
Just after World War II, British official Bunning and Danish official (and penguin enthusiast) Søndergaard have a friendly argument over a small island. Cast: Martin Clunes (Bunning) and Tom Goodman-Hill (Søndergaard)
11	5	"Here's What We Do"	5 July 2017
Pidge, a college student, recruits his younger friend Gavin to help him steal something from Clare College, Cambridge. Cast: Kieran Hodgson (Pidge) and Ethan Lawrence (Gavin)
12	6	"The Wroxton Box"	12 July 2017
In a signal box in Wroxton, Alec notices something unusual about Percy and attempts to deduce what's going on. Cast: Michael Palin (Percy) and John Finnemore (Alec)
