= Cabin Pressure (radio series) =

BBC Radio show

- Cover of the complete CD collection of Cabin Pressure, depicting cast. Left-to-right: John Finnemore, Roger Allam, Stephanie Cole and Benedict Cumberbatch.
- Genre: Sitcom
- Running time: 28 minutes
- Country of origin: United Kingdom
- Language: English
- Home station: BBC Radio 4
- Syndicates: BBC Radio 4 Extra
- Starring: Stephanie Cole; Roger Allam; Benedict Cumberbatch; John Finnemore
- Created by: John Finnemore
- Written by: John Finnemore
- Directed by: David Tyler
- Produced by: David Tyler
- Recording studio: RADA Studios
- Original release: 2 July 2008 – 24 December 2014
- No. of series: 4 (plus Christmas special and a two-part finale)
- No. of episodes: 27
- Audio format: Stereo
- Opening theme: Ruslan and Lyudmila overture by Mikhail Glinka
- Website: www.bbc.co.uk/programmes/b00lmcxj

Cabin Pressure is a radio sitcom written and created by John Finnemore and directed and produced by David Tyler. It follows the exploits of the eccentric crew of the single aeroplane owned by MJN Air as they are chartered to take all manner of items, people and animals across the world. The show stars Finnemore, Stephanie Cole, Roger Allam and Benedict Cumberbatch. John Finnemore's father David, who was an airline pilot, is credited as "aviation consultant" (Note: Credited only in Zurich pt 2).

The programme was first broadcast on BBC Radio 4 in 2008. Four series have been broadcast, along with a special 2010 Christmas Day episode. The show's two-part finale, entitled Zurich, was broadcast on 23 and 24 December 2014.

The series' opening music is Mikhail Glinka's Overture to Ruslan and Lyudmila.

== Overview ==
=== Setting ===
The story takes place at MJN Air, the world's smallest airline, consisting of just one 16-seater aeroplane: a Lockheed McDonnell 3-12 business jet, with the aircraft registration Golf Echo Romeo Tango India — G-ERTI — and thus nicknamed Gerti. The company name derives from when owner Carolyn Knapp-Shappey (Stephanie Cole) was awarded Gerti as part of her divorce settlement with her Australian husband, Gordon Shappey, (Timothy West) and thus proudly proclaimed that Gerti was: "My Jet Now". The company is so small — with Carolyn joking that MJN was not so much an airline as more of an "airdot" — that everything is run on a tight budget and they are willing to take on any job to keep the business going. The company is based in the fictional Fitton Airport, located somewhere in the Midlands.

Each episode is named after a different city, (often a destination for MJN in the episode) each beginning with a successive letter of the alphabet, starting with Abu Dhabi. The episodes were not broadcast by the BBC in alphabetical order, but The Complete Cabin Pressure: From A to Z collection lists the episodes alphabetically.

=== Plot ===
The story follows the day-to-day working life of MJN Air and its crew of four: Captain Martin Crieff (Benedict Cumberbatch), whose love of flying and planes is let down by his lack of natural ability; First Officer Douglas Richardson (Roger Allam), an experienced captain formerly at Air England until he was sacked for smuggling; Carolyn Knapp-Shappey (Stephanie Cole), the owner and one-time air stewardess; and Arthur Shappey (John Finnemore), Carolyn's overexcited and idiotic (but well-meaning) son who works as a flight attendant.

Much of the plot revolves around the relationship between Douglas and Martin in the cockpit. Whilst Martin is the captain, Douglas is more experienced, and most people consider Douglas to be superior to him in almost every way. When meeting both men, most guests mistakenly believe Douglas to be the captain rather than Martin. Carolyn refers to Douglas as the "good pilot" and Martin as the "safe pilot". Also, whilst Douglas gets paid, Martin does not because Carolyn cannot afford it. Thus Martin also has a second job with his own "man-with-a-van" business, Icarus Removals, using a van he inherited from his late father, and lives a life of poverty in a student flat-share.

Douglas, meanwhile, has to do his job in order to pay two different alimonies and tries to keep secret from his third wife, Helena, that he is not a captain. It is later revealed that after Douglas confessed to this deception Helena revealed that she was having an affair with her tai chi instructor. Douglas is also a recovering alcoholic, having been sober for a period of several years at the time the story begins, although he tries to prevent anyone else from knowing about it, fearing it will tarnish his image.

Much of the time on the flight-deck is spent with the crew playing various games to pass the time such as "Flight-deck Buckeroo", "People Who Aren't Evil But Have Evil Sounding Names", "Brians of Britain", "Books That Sound More Interesting with the Final Letter Knocked Off", (e.g. Three Men in a Boa, Of Mice and Me), and the game of "The Travelling Lemon" — wherein a lemon must be hidden in plain sight among the passengers, without anyone complaining, to be discovered by the next player. This is the origin of the phrase "The lemon is in play" used by Douglas in the episodes Qikiqtarjuaq and Zurich Part 2.

Though MJN squabble among themselves, in several episodes the crew unite to combat a common enemy or problem. A recurring antagonist is Gordon Shappey (Timothy West), Carolyn's ex-husband and Arthur's father, who resents Carolyn obtaining the jet in the divorce and frequently tries to reacquire it through means fair and foul. Other recurring characters include Mr Birling (Geoffrey Whitehead), who every year hires the plane to take him to see the final match in the Six Nations Rugby Union tournament. On "Birling Day" the crew toady to Birling in the hope that he will give them all large tips, even going so far as hastily organising (and faking) a flight to Timbuktu to watch the final in order to spite his wife. Every Birling Day Douglas attempts to steal the prized 25-year-old Talisker single malt whisky intended for Mr Birling and sell it on while Carolyn and the rest of the crew try to stop him. In addition, Douglas and Martin, despite their personal differences and mutual animosity, also prove to be an effective and highly cooperative duo in some of the more dangerous situations. For example in the episode "St Petersburg", when one of G-ERTI's engines fails after a lethal bird strike, they successfully work together to pull off an emergency landing, thus saving Carolyn and Arthur's lives as well as their own, although Carolyn is typically less grateful than the two pilots would prefer.

Another recurring character is Captain Hercules "Herc" Shipwright (Anthony Head), a former colleague of Douglas who now works at Scottish airline Air Caledonia. Herc is an occasional rival to Douglas (partly due to Herc's refusal to consider Douglas for a position with Air Caledonia) and a love interest to Carolyn, though she is reluctant to reciprocate Herc's affections.

Princess Theresa of Liechtenstein (Matilda Ziegler) appears in the final season, first appearing when she hires MJN to take her younger brother and ruling monarch, King Maxi, to Fitton so he can return to school. She and Martin begin a romantic relationship owing to their shared love of aeroplanes and childhood dreams of becoming pilots.

In the two-part series finale, after a peculiar job interview in "Yverdon-les-Bains", Martin has been offered a paid job at Swiss Air, which means MJN has to close down and Gerti has to be sold. However when Gordon tries to purchase Gerti Arthur puts in a gigantic bid to stop his father from buying the plane. Douglas suspects that there is something valuable hidden on the plane and MJN manage to buy back Gerti. His suspicions prove correct when he discovers that in an effort to hide his wealth and assets Gordon had replaced all the copper wiring of the plane with gold, not expecting that Carolyn would get the plane in their divorce. Martin concludes he is a more skilled pilot than he thought, having been struggling in the past years with a poorly weighted plane, and the solution to Carolyn's financial problems has been right under her nose all along. Carolyn uses the money to secure the company's future, renaming it OJS Air ("Our Jet Still"). In a fairy-tale ending, Martin takes up his new job securing paid employment with Swiss Airways and living close to his girlfriend, Princess Theresa, in Vaduz; Douglas is promoted to Captain; and Herc — who accepts a downwards career move due to his affections for Carolyn — is hired as the new First Officer. The series ends with OJS flying off into the sunset to Addis Ababa, bringing the alphabetical progression of cities full circle.

== Reception ==
Writing in The Independent newspaper, Nicholas Lezard praised the first series highly, called "the writing and performances ... exceptional" and suggested that the show "deserves an award". Gillian Reynolds of The Daily Telegraph called Cabin Pressure "one of the best written, cast, acted and directed comedies on anywhere." Tom Eames of Digital Spy said "Finnemore should really be a household name by now. Not only does he play a hilarious character brilliantly, but his scriptwriting is up there with some of the best British comedy writers of all time." Jane Anderson of Radio Times called Cabin Pressure "the comedy series where the writing and acting are so tight they're in danger of cutting off your blood supply."

Partly due to the popularity of leading actor Benedict Cumberbatch, the show has a significant fandom, and its final episode received a record number of requests for audience tickets for a Radio 4 comedy recording: 22,854 requests for just 200 available tickets. It has been argued that this is an example of the Odagiri effect occurring in western media.

=== Awards ===
Cabin Pressure was nominated for a Writers' Guild of Great Britain award in 2010. In 2011, John Finnemore won the Best Radio Comedy 2011, awarded by the Writers' Guild of Great Britain. It was nominated for the Best Scripted Comedy category at the 2012 BBC Audio Drama Awards. The series has won numerous Comedy.co.uk Awards, voted for by readers of the British Comedy Guide. The series won the award for "Best British Radio Sitcom" for 2011, 2013, and 2014. Also it was voted "Comedy of the Year" across TV and radio for 2014, making it the first, and as of 2026 the only, radio show to be given the honour.

== Episode list ==
The episode titles follow an alphabetical sequence, beginning with the first episode, "Abu Dhabi", followed by "Boston" etc. In Series 2 and 3 episodes were broadcast out of the original intended order for various reasons. The episodes however are listed in alphabetical order in The Complete Cabin Pressure: From A To Z collection, and Finnemore has stated that the series was always meant to be heard alphabetically. The titles usually refer to a destination which the characters visit or are travelling to. However, some refer to locations that are not visited but play a key role in an episode's plot, such as "Kuala Lumpur" when, during standby in Fitton, Arthur insists on Carolyn specifying a destination (i.e. Kuala Lumpur) for a flight when undertaking stewarding training.

Cabin Pressure episode names (intercontinental)
Cabin Pressure episode names (Europe) (The fictional Fitton, home of MJN Air, is not shown)

=== Series one ===
No. overall	No. in series	Title	Original release date
1	1	"Abu Dhabi"	2 July 2008
After a £7,000 diversion to Bristol, Carolyn forbids Martin to make any more diversions in the future. Partway to Abu Dhabi, however, Douglas realizes that, despite reminders about the cargo-hold heating, Martin has left a client's cat in the unheated hold. Martin must decide whether to divert or to let the cat freeze. Meanwhile, Arthur attempts to discover how aeroplanes fly. Guest Cast: Ewen MacIntosh as Karl
2	2	"Boston"	9 July 2008
A stubborn passenger refuses to extinguish his cigarette and makes Martin cry. Arthur, on a mission, accidentally gives the passenger a heart attack, forcing Martin to fly back and forth between Reykjavik and Boston in indecision. Meanwhile, Martin and Douglas play a challenging game of "Simon Says". Guest Cast: Ewen MacIntosh as Karl, Kerry Shale as Hamilton Leeman, Matilda Ziegler as both the Paramedic and Shanwick ATC (Air Traffic Control)
3	3	"Cremona"	16 July 2008
MJN are flying an actress, for whom Arthur has a particular fondness and Carolyn not so much, to Cremona, Italy. Martin tries in vain to impress her but instead attracts her ire when she blames him for a horde of her fans showing up at her hotel. Douglas saves Martin from her anger with a dozen black shirts. Guest Cast: Helen Baxendale as Hester MacCaulay, Rufus Jones as Percival, Robert Harley as Gawain, Ali Amadi as Lancelot
4	4	"Douz"	23 July 2008
MJN are stranded on the outskirts of the Sahara while Carolyn refuses to pay a pricey bill and Martin quibbles over a firetruck. Douglas joins a Scottish team in an exciting match of topless cricket while Arthur takes some embarrassing photos. Guest Cast: John Sessions as Yves Jutteau, Rufus Jones as Captain Jessop, Robert Harley as Lachlan, Ali Amadi as Habib
5	5	"Edinburgh"	30 July 2008
It's the annual Birling day, where MJN flies the wealthy Mr Birling to a Six Nations rugby match. Martin resents Birling's pompous ways and doesn't understand why Douglas and Arthur toady to him so much until he realizes that Birling gives huge tips to people he likes (as much as £6,000 when his team wins). Douglas and Carolyn are at war over a bottle of very expensive 25-year-old Talisker single-malt whisky. Guest Cast: Geoffrey Whitehead as Mr Birling, Adam G Goodwin as Philip
6	6	"Fitton"	6 August 2008
The crew are on standby at Fitton, waiting for an important client to call. Carolyn tries to keep them all sober in case the client calls; when she fails, drunk Martin must act as steward and sober Arthur has to pretend to be captain. In an attempt to return a gift, Martin discovers a shocking secret about Douglas. Guest Cast: Adam G Goodwin as Mr Goddard, Melisande Cook as Helena Richardson

=== Series two ===
No. overall	No. in series	Title	Original release date
7	1	"Helsinki"	17 July 2009
Carolyn and her sister have not spoken for fifteen years, so when Arthur books a fake trip to Helsinki for his mother's birthday with Carolyn's sister, her husband, and her grandson, Kieran, it is all a little awkward. Douglas exchanges orchids for fishcakes, Kieran intimidates Martin by showing some exceptional karate skills, and Arthur makes an imaginative birthday cake. Guest Cast: Alison Steadman as Ruth, Matt Green as Kieran, Simon Greenall as Milo
8	2	"Gdańsk"	24 July 2009
MJN is flying the eccentric and deranged members of a Polish chamber orchestra back to Gdańsk. Carolyn is left to deal with a highly paranoid passenger who requests explanations for fractionally elevated arm-rests, broken glass-salt, poisoned cheesecake, and 'Goofy'. Douglas and Martin place series of escalating bets over the cheese tray, including a passenger derby commentated by Arthur, resulting in Martin revealing a shocking secret to Douglas. Guest Cast: Britta Gartner as Madame Szyszko Bohusz, Simon Greenall as the Conductor
9	3	"Ipswich"	31 July 2009
Carolyn, Douglas, Martin, and Arthur are sent on a Safety and Emergency Procedures course. Arthur struggles with his stupidity, Douglas struggles with his impatience with Mr Sargent and Martin struggles with a health issue, so Carolyn is forced to work hard to keep her crew from losing their jobs. Guest Cast: Philip Davis as Mr Sargent, Alex MacQueen as Dr Duncan
10	4	"Johannesburg"	7 August 2009
After an unsuccessful birthday treat for Douglas's daughter, resulting in the crew having koi sushi. Carolyn makes a bet with her pilots. However, a dodgy warning light means that Martin and Arthur must fetch the engineer in a baggage truck. Douglas scrapes €20 by washing the airfield manager's car, Carolyn relaxes on a deckchair and Arthur uses the engine exhausts to make boiling water which ends badly. Guest Cast: Michael Fenton Stevens as Señor Quintanilla, Javier Marzan as Diego
11	5	"Kuala Lumpur"	14 August 2009
Martin discovers a secret, illegal airfield pub frequented by Douglas and other airfield staff and cannot decide whether to report it, as duty requires, or to turn a blind eye, as surprisingly everyone at the pub seems to like him. Meanwhile, Carolyn tries to improve Arthur's stewarding skills. Guest Cast: Paul Putner as Dave, Roger Morlidge as George
12	6	"Limerick"	21 August 2009
MJN are flying an insufferably long flight into a never-ending sunset, from Hong Kong over Russia to Limerick, with the somewhat unsavoury contents of an ice-box. Arthur tries the spot-check method of learning the phonetic alphabet, Douglas and Martin play a game of evil-sounding names, and try some creative limericks.

=== Christmas special ===
No. overall	No. in series	Title	Original release date
13	1	"Molokaʻi"	25 December 2010
It's Christmas aboard Gerti and Arthur is singing merrily. Carolyn is treating a yacht salesman, Mr Alyakin, on the trip to Molokaʻi, but he begins to doubt the airline's competence, while Martin and Douglas go to extravagant lengths in an attempt to make it Arthur's best Christmas ever, within seven minutes. Guest Cast: Ben Willbond as Mr Alyakhin

=== Series three ===
No. overall	No. in series	Title	Original release date
14	1	"Qikiqtarjuaq"	1 July 2011
A Canadian passenger informs Douglas that he is not professional but Martin is, which infuriates Douglas and causes him to humiliate Martin. Arthur teaches the passengers all about bears and Douglas chases them. Carolyn and Douglas also play a game of "the travelling lemon" which ends badly when Martin has a go. Guest Cast: Melanie Hudson as Nancy Dean Liebhart, Kosha Engler as Mrs Cook, Ewan Bailey as Mr Peary
15	2	"Paris"	8 July 2011
It's Birling Day again and Carolyn has put Martin in charge of ensuring Douglas doesn't steal the expensive whisky meant for their client. But when the whisky does disappear and the evidence seems to point to everyone except Douglas, Martin must become the Miss Marple of MJN Air and discover the real culprit. Guest Cast: Geoffrey Whitehead as Mr Birling, Flip Webster as Mrs Birling, Ewan Bailey as Phil
16	3	"Newcastle"	15 July 2011
Martin has a soft spot for a Scottish first officer who is travelling with MJN for the day. However, Martin gets in a muddle and it all becomes a bit awkward. Carolyn meets a captain called Herc and everyone immerses themselves in exciting games whilst Martin applies a navigation-tail light onto the back of the plane. (Note: Martin is played by Tom Goodman-Hill.) Guest Cast: Anthony Head as Herc Shipwright, Mark Williams as Eddie, Anna Crilly as Linda Fairburn
17	4	"Ottery St Mary"	22 July 2011
When Martin sprains his ankle and can't complete a piano delivery for his second job, Douglas and Arthur agree to help, but forgotten addresses, missing van keys, and Arthur's game of Yellow Car make the trip much more complicated than expected. Back in Fitton, Herc and Carolyn go out for lunch and an eventful dog-walk. Guest Cast: Anthony Head as Herc Shipwright, Flip Webster as The Lady from the Laurels, Ewan Bailey as Mr Hardy
18	5	"Rotterdam"	29 July 2011
MJN are filming welcome and safety demonstration videos to make the airline look more professional. When no one on the crew is able or willing to deliver the lines, Carolyn appoints an actor called Martin, making the original Martin deeply jealous and paranoid. But a little competition from Herc might convince Douglas to do the video after all. Guest Cast: Anthony Head as Herc Shipwright, Gus Brown as Martin Davenport
19	6	"St. Petersburg"	5 August 2011
A bird strike takes out an engine, which could lead to the end of MJN Air, so Carolyn is forced to call in her ex-husband. Douglas and Martin entertain themselves with a game of "rhyming journeys" while Arthur is sure Douglas will sort the situation out. Guest Cast: Timothy West as Gordon Shappey, Paul Shearer as Tommo

=== Series four ===
No. overall	No. in series	Title	Original release date
20	1	"Timbuktu"	9 January 2013
MJN are looking forward to their day off when Mr Birling turns up demanding to be flown to Timbuktu to watch the Rugby World Cup on television so he can prove a point to his "awful wife". Martin discovers a slight problem with the planned destination, Arthur is reading a potentially problematic book and could this be the year that Carolyn steals the whisky from Douglas? Guest Cast: Geoffrey Whitehead as Mr Birling, Steve Brody as Giancarlo and Karl
21	2	"Uskerty"	16 January 2013
The crew are in Ireland, where Carolyn is purchasing a birthday present for Herc, assisted by Martin. However, difficulties with heavy rain, stubborn taxi drivers, poor phone reception, angry bees and jewellery-eating geese ensue. Meanwhile, Douglas and Arthur enjoy the luxuries of an empty airport with an over-enthusiastic manager. Guest Cast: Marian McLoughlin as Breeda, Robert Wilfort as Gerry, John O'Mahony as Farmer Fisher
22	3	"Vaduz"	23 January 2013
An incredulous crew escort the young King of Liechtenstein and Princess Theresa to England, the latter becoming fond of Martin, but encounter a misunderstanding with fuel. Meanwhile, Herc is eager to enjoy his holiday, but Carolyn refuses to return his affections. Guest Cast: Anthony Head as Herc Shipwright, Matilda Ziegler as Princess Theresa, Kieran Hodgson as King Maximilian, Dan Tetsell as Otto/Karl
23	4	"Wokingham"	30 January 2013
Martin learns his mother has fallen ill and so tries to juggle flying, his secret delivery job, and competing with his sister to care for his mother, eventually enlisting Arthur to help, but when his dominating brother Simon turns up, Martin is determined to prove himself. Meanwhile, Carolyn and Douglas challenge each other to speak in words of only one syllable. Guest Cast: Prunella Scales as Wendy Crieff, Rosie Cavaliero as Caitlin Crieff, Justin Edwards as Simon Crieff, Dan Tetsell as Dr White
24	5	"Xinzhou"	6 February 2013
The crew must spend the night on Gerti but are distracted by uncomplicated word games — like "Fizz-Buzz", which Arthur cannot understand — and a constant alarm requiring trips out into the snow. Martin reveals his developing relationship with a princess, and Carolyn must make a decision about Herc. Guest Cast: Lobo Chan as the Chinese ATC
25	6	"Yverdon-les-Bains"	13 February 2013
Martin goes to an interview with Swiss Airways and must fight for a place as a professional pilot as his quibbling nature shows through. Herc and Douglas battle for metaphorical control of the plane — with the cheese and fruit trays between them — leaving Douglas with a sky-shattering insight into his relationship with Martin, and Arthur discovers the perils of dragon fruit. Guest Cast: Anthony Head as Herc Shipwright, Kate Duchêne as Captain Elise Deroche, Nicholas Woodeson as Oskar Bider

=== Zurich ===
No. overall	No. in series	Title	Original release date
26	1	"Zurich, Part 1"	23 December 2014
As Martin decides whether to take his new job with Swiss Air, is this the end for MJN Air? While Carolyn has to sell off G-ERTI, Arthur is considering a new career himself, and just what has he painted on the side of the van? The crew of MJN Air discover that whether it's choosing an ice-cream flavour, putting a princess in a van, or remembering your grandmother's name, no job is too small, but many, many jobs are too difficult. Guest Cast: Anthony Head as Herc Shipwright, Timothy West as Gordon Shappey, Matilda Ziegler as Princess Theresa, Gordon Kennedy as Bruce Fraser, Jonathan Kydd as the auctioneer, Dan Tetsell as Rick and Karl.
27	2	"Zurich, Part 2"	24 December 2014
The crew try to work out why Gordon is so desperate to get Gerti back, — just what is Gerti's secret? — they embark on a race against time in another of Douglas's schemes, while Carolyn makes a big decision about Herc. Guest Cast: Anthony Head as Herc Shipwright, Timothy West as Gordon Shappey, Matilda Ziegler as Princess Theresa, Gordon Kennedy as Bruce Fraser, Jonathan Kydd as the auctioneer, Dan Tetsell as Rick and Karl.

== After Zurich ==
In 2018 and 2019 John Finnemore toured a live stage version of John Finnemore's Souvenir Programme. One sketch was an interview of Arthur Shappey in which he outlines the post-Cabin Pressure futures of the show's cast. These include Herc and Carolyn being married, Douglas remaining captain, and Martin and Princess Theresa's continuing relationship. Arthur is still working as cabin crew, but pretends in the sketch that he is studying and riding polar bears in Kuala Lumpur.

Between March and August 2020, during the COVID-19 pandemic, Finnemore again revived the character of Arthur Shappey for a one-man online YouTube spin-off series called Cabin Fever! which takes the form of a 26-part online vlog by the character in quarantine and later lockdown. The other main Cabin Pressure characters are occasionally mentioned.

== Multimedia ==
A number of CD releases for the show have been made by BBC Physical Audio and the production company Pozzitive.

Series	Release date	Notes
Cabin Pressure: The Complete Series 1	5 July 2012	
Cabin Pressure: The Complete Series 2	3 August 2012	
Cabin Pressure: The Complete Series 3	6 September 2012	
Cabin Pressure: The Complete Series 4	2 May 2013	
Cabin Pressure Zurich	29 January 2015	Final two-part episode
Cabin Pressure: The Collected Series 1-3	1 November 2012	Includes Christmas episode
Cabin Pressure: A-Z	5 February 2015	Includes all episodes and special features
