= Laurence Howarth =

Laurence Howarth is an English comic actor and writer. He has appeared in one episode each of the TV series Miranda (2009), After You've Gone (2007), Hyperdrive (2006), Blessed (2005), The Robinsons (2005), My Hero (2005) and Dark Ages (1999). He has also appeared in the radio comedy Bleak Expectations and written for TV to Go, the 2006 TV series of Dead Ringers, and for Alistair McGowan's Big Impression (1996).

He is one half of the double act Laurence & Gus, alongside fellow comedian and writer Gus Brown. Together they have made two series of comedy sketch shows for BBC Radio 4 - Laurence & Gus: Untold Stories (2004); Laurence & Gus: Men In Love (2006). In 2009, recording was completed for a series called Laurence & Gus: Hearts & Minds.

Howarth has also created two black comedies for BBC Radio 4. Rigor Mortis looks at the lives of pathologists working in a hospital mortuary, while Safety Catch is about a man who has drifted into arms-dealing without quite knowing why. Safety Catch is co-written with John Finnemore.

More recently, he has appeared as BBC Senior Technical Services Choreographer Adam Brady in the comedy W1A (2014-2017), and is a writer and actor portraying John McDonnell and other characters in Tracey Breaks The News.
