= John Finnemore =

British comedy writer and actor (born 1977)

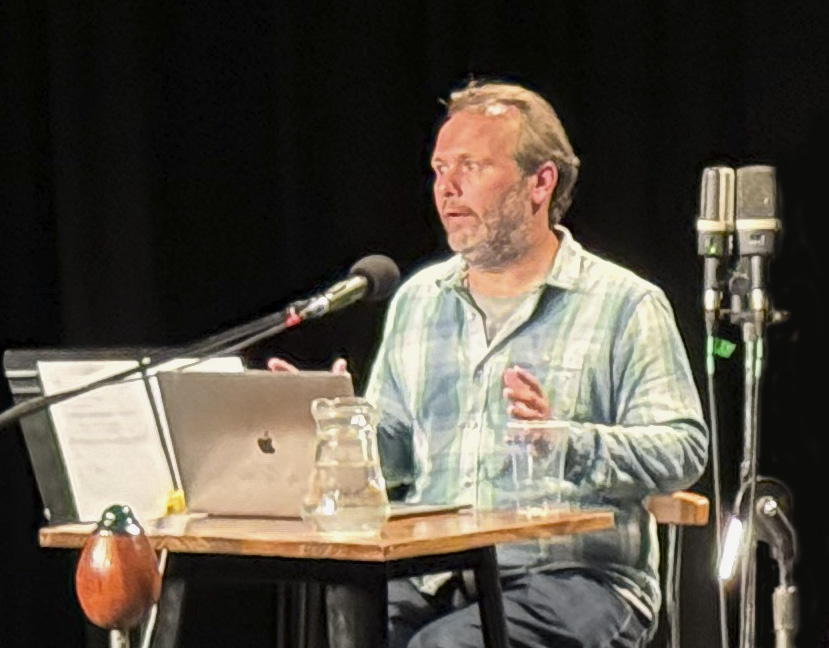
- Finnemore recording at RADA Studio in 2024
- Born: John David Finnemore; 28 September 1977 (age 49); Reading, England
- Education: Dolphin School, Berkshire; High Lea, Dorset; Poole Grammar School; Peterhouse, Cambridge
- Occupations: Writer, comedian, actor
- Writing career
- Pen name: Emu (as crossword writer)
- Years active: 2000 – present
- Notable works: Cabin Pressure; Souvenir Programme; Double Acts
- Notable awards: Writers' Guild of Great Britain: Outstanding Contribution to Writing (2020)
- Website: www.johnfinnemore.com

John David Finnemore (born 28 September 1977) is a British comedy writer and actor. He wrote and performed in the radio series Cabin Pressure, John Finnemore's Souvenir Programme, and John Finnemore's Double Acts, and frequently features in other BBC Radio 4 comedy shows such as The Now Show. Finnemore has won more Comedy.co.uk awards than any other writer, and two of his shows appear in the top ten of the Radio Times' list of greatest ever radio comedies. He also is the writer of season 2 of Good Omens.

When John married his wife, their marriage vows were conducted by his friend and colleague Stephanie Cole.

== Early life and education ==
John Finnemore was born in Reading to parents David and Patricia and has a younger sister, Anna. He attended Dolphin School in Berkshire, High Lea in Dorset and Poole Grammar School. At 19, he moved to Kraków in Poland, where he spent 6 months teaching English.

He then studied English at Peterhouse, Cambridge, where he wrote his dissertation on Thomas Hardy ('Icons, Frames and Freedom in Jude the Obscure') and graduated in 2000. He was a member of the Cambridge Footlights, becoming vice-president in his final year. After graduating, he performed in Sensible Haircut with the Footlights team at the Edinburgh Festival Fringe in 2000.

== Career ==
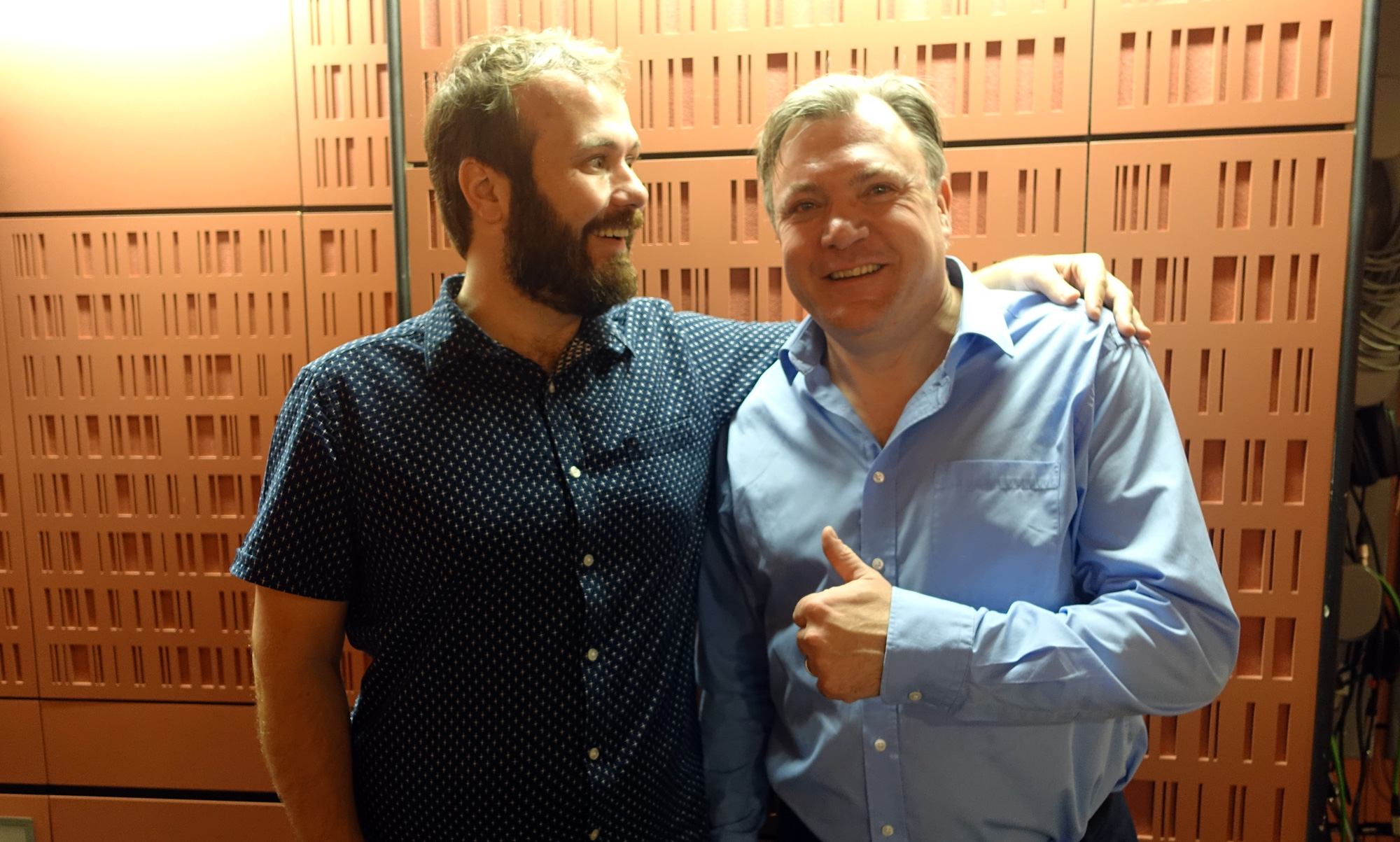
Finnemore (left) with Ed Balls at BBC Radio 4 in 2017

=== As writer and comedian ===
Finnemore wrote the BBC Radio 4 sitcom Cabin Pressure and played the part of the "consistently cheery steward" Arthur. The sitcom aired for four series between 2008 and Christmas 2014, with a two-part finale at Christmas and New Year 2014–2015. He also wrote a radio sketch show, John Finnemore's Souvenir Programme, which he performed with Simon Kane, Carrie Quinlan, Lawry Lewin and Margaret Cabourn-Smith. The first series was broadcast on BBC Radio 4 in 2011, and a special edition recorded at the Edinburgh Festival Fringe was broadcast in 2012. Seven further series followed annually until 2019, and a ninth series was broadcast in 2021. In 2023, 2024 and 2025, Souvenir Programme took the form of an annual 45-minute special.

A stage version of Souvenir Programme, renamed John Finnemore's Flying Visit, completed two UK tours. The first between May and June 2018, and the second from September to November 2019 with a bonus date in December.

Finnemore went on to write John Finnemore's Double Acts, an anthology series of loosely connected two-handers. The first series of six episodes aired on BBC Radio 4 from October 2015, and was released on CD in 2016. A second series of six episodes was broadcast in 2017.

Finnemore has written extensively for other comedy shows, both on radio and TV, including That Mitchell and Webb Sound (2003–2009), That Mitchell and Webb Look (2006–2010), Dead Ringers (2003–2007), Tittybangbang (2005–2007), Safety Catch, The Now Show and The Unbelievable Truth (2011). From 2009 to 2012, he co-wrote the podcast David Mitchell's Soap Box with Mitchell. He has also been credited as programme associate on 10 O'Clock Live and Was it Something I Said?

In September 2011, Finnemore wrote a pilot episode for BBC One called George and Bernard Shaw, a sitcom starring Robert Lindsay and Richard Griffiths as an elderly gay couple. The show was not picked up for a full series.

Finnemore has appeared on various BBC Radio 4 shows, including The Now Show, The Unbelievable Truth, I'm Sorry I Haven't A Clue, Just a Minute, and The News Quiz and is a regular performer at the bi-monthly Tall Tales storytelling shows held in North London.

Since 2016, he has written Listener cryptic crosswords under the pseudonym 'Emu', published in The Times.

During the COVID-19 pandemic, Finnemore uploaded videos to his YouTube channel entitled "Cabin Fever" as his Cabin Pressure character Arthur Shappey. These would often involve games or puzzles for the viewer. In this period, he became the fourth person to win a prize for solving Cain's Jawbone, a literary puzzle created by Edward Powys Mathers in 1934. In 2023, Finnemore revealed he was writing a sequel to the puzzle, to be published by Unbound in 2024. The book titled "The Researcher's First Murder: A New Cain's Jawbone Puzzle" was first published on 22. August 2024 by Unbound.

Finnemore was also a co-writer, with Neil Gaiman, of the second series of Good Omens, which starred Michael Sheen and David Tennant.

In May 2027, Finnemore's five-play cycle The Traitors: Acts of Betrayal, based on the reality TV show The Traitors, will have its world premiere at the Gillian Lynne Theatre in London's West End.

He was appointed an Associate Fellow at Downing College, Cambridge in October 2026.

=== As actor/self ===
Finnemore appeared as recurring minor character Chris in Miranda Hart's television sitcom Miranda, in the episodes "Teacher" (2009), "Before I Die" (2010), "The Dinner Party" (2013) and "I Do, But to Who?" (2014).

In 2014 Finnemore was the narrator for 24 Hours to Go Broke on Dave in the episodes "Iceland", "Greece", "Germany", "Ireland" and "Armenia". and two years later was runner-up on Celebrity Mastermind, his specialist subject the ghost stories of M. R. James.

John Finnemore featured as Paul, a Space Shuttle pilot in Armando Iannucci's American space comedy Avenue 5, for which he has also written teleplays for several episodes.

== Filmography ==
Year	Title	Role	Notes
2009–2014	Miranda	Chris	Episodes: "Teacher", "Before I Die", "The Dinner Party" and "I Do, But to Who?"
2009	That Mitchell and Webb Look	Fruitcake Croupier (uncredited)	Series 3; episode 3
2011	Peeder Jigson's Video Diary	Charlie Dimmock	Episode: "What Everyone's Up to in the Break"
2011	Peeder Jigson's Video Diary	John Finn	Episode: "Naming the Dwarves"
2011	George and Bernard Shaw	Oliver	Pilot
2012	Family Guy	voices (various)	Episode: "Family Guy Viewer Mail" #2
2014	24 Hours to Go Broke	Narrator	Episodes: "Iceland", "Greece", "Germany", "Ireland" and "Armenia"
2017	Carters Get Rich	Oliver Campbell-Legge	Series regular; 6 episodes
2020	Avenue 5	Shuttle pilot Paul	Recurring role; 3 episodes
2022	Unfinished London	Sir Joseph Bazalgette	Celebrity guest in episode 12: "Tower Bridge could have looked very different"

== Awards and nominations ==
In 2020 the Radio Times released their list of greatest comedies ever, as judged by an expert panel. Finnemore was the only individual with two entries in the top ten, with Cabin Pressure and John Finnemore's Souvenir Programme taking eighth and tenth spots respectively. Cabin Pressure was also voted "Comedy of the Year" in 2014 across TV and radio, making it the first radio show to be given the honour.

Finnemore has won more Comedy.co.uk Awards than any other writer. When adding together shows for which Finnemore is the main writer or an additional writer, his work has resulted in him winning 13 awards.

Finnemore has also written for other shows that have won Comedy.co.uk Awards such as That Mitchell and Webb Sound which was voted "Best British Radio Sketch Show" in 2009, 2010, and 2013; That Mitchell and Webb Look which was voted "Best British TV Sketch Show" in 2006 and 2009; and The Unbelievable Truth which was voted "Best British Radio Panel Show" in 2011.

=== Selected awards ===
Year	Work	Award	Category	Result	Ref.
2010	Cabin Pressure	Writers' Guild of Great Britain	Best Radio Comedy	Nominated	
2011	Cabin Pressure	Comedy.co.uk Awards	Best British Radio Sitcom	Won	
2011	John Finnemore's Souvenir Programme	Comedy.co.uk Awards	Best Radio Sketch Show	Won	
2011	Cabin Pressure	Writers' Guild of Great Britain	Best Radio Comedy	Won	
2012	John Finnemore's Souvenir Programme	Comedy.co.uk Awards	Best Radio Sketch Show	Won	
2012	Cabin Pressure	BBC Audio Drama Awards	Best Scripted Comedy (drama)	Nominated	
2012	John Finnemore's Souvenir Programme	Chortle Awards	Radio Award	Nominated	
2013	Cabin Pressure	Comedy.co.uk Awards	Best British Radio Sitcom	Won	
2013	John Finnemore's Souvenir Programme	Radio Academy Awards	Best Comedy	Nominated	
2013	John Finnemore's Souvenir Programme	Chortle Awards	Radio Award	Won	
2014	Cabin Pressure	Comedy.co.uk Awards	Best British Radio Sitcom	Won	
2014	Cabin Pressure	Comedy.co.uk Awards	Comedy of the Year	Won	
2014	John Finnemore's Souvenir Programme	Comedy.co.uk Awards	Best Radio Sketch Show	Won	
2014	Cabin Pressure	BBC Audio Drama Awards	Best Scripted Comedy (studio audience)	Nominated	
2014	Cabin Pressure	BBC Audio Drama Awards	Best Scripted Comedy (drama)	Nominated	
2014	John Finnemore's Souvenir Programme	Radio Academy Awards	Best Comedy	silver	
2015	John Finnemore's Double Acts	Comedy.co.uk Awards	Best Radio Sitcom	Won	
2015	John Finnemore's Souvenir Programme	BBC Audio Drama Awards	Best Scripted Comedy (studio audience)	Won	
2016	Cabin Pressure (Finale: "Zurich")	BBC Audio Drama Awards	Best Scripted Comedy (drama)	Nominated	
2016	John Finnemore's Souvenir Programme	Comedy.co.uk Awards	Best Radio Sketch Show	Won	
2017	Double Acts (S1, Ep 5 "English for Pony Lovers")	Writers' Guild of Great Britain	Best Radio Comedy	Won	
2018	Double Acts (S2, Ep 4 "Penguin Diplomacy")	Tinniswood Award	Best Audio Drama Script of the Year	commended	
2018	Double Acts (S2, Ep 4 "Penguin Diplomacy")	Writers' Guild of Great Britain	Best Radio Comedy	Nominated	
2019	John Finnemore's Souvenir Programme	BBC Audio Drama Awards	Best Scripted Comedy (sketch show)	Won	
2019	John Finnemore's Souvenir Programme	Chortle Awards	Radio Award	Nominated	
2020	n/a	Writers' Guild of Great Britain	Outstanding Contribution to Writing	Won	
