= Diana Moran =

English model, TV presenter and writer

Diana Moran BEM
- Born: Diana Ruth Dicker; 11 June 1939 (age 87); Bristol, England, UK
- Occupations: Model, broadcaster, journalist
- Years active: 1960s–present
- Spouse(s): John Moran (1959–19?? divorced); Peter Cranham (1989–1993; divorced)
- Children: 2
- Website: http://www.green-goddess.tv

Diana Moran (born Diana Ruth Dicker; 11 June 1939) is an English model, fitness expert and journalist. In the 1960s, and 1970s, Moran was a print and catwalk model. She also appeared as a TV announcer and newsreader for HTV West.

== Early life ==
She attended St George Grammar School, Bristol, which closed in September 1970.

== Career ==
Her greatest fame was achieved between 1983 and 1987, when she hosted the popular exercise segment of BBC1's Breakfast Time programme. Because of her trademark green leotard, she became known as the "Green Goddess". A book, record and video, Get Fit with the Green Goddess, were published by the BBC in 1984. She presented a daily programme on the Overseas Property Channel and was a regular contributor to BBC Breakfast and Five's The Wright Stuff. In 2007, she starred in a music video for the band Superthriller, reprising her role as an aerobics instructor. In 2012, she was involved in the launch of Age UK's DAB radio station The Wireless, on which she presents the show We've Got Mail.

== Charity work ==
Moran was diagnosed with breast cancer in May 1988 and had a double mastectomy and reconstruction. She was also diagnosed with Skin cancer. She has become a breast cancer advocate for the Breast Cancer Campaign and other breast cancer charities. In July 2015, Moran campaigned to raise awareness about breast cancer symptoms among women aged over seventy. She claims her fitness as an octogenarian is a tribute to her lifelong exercise regime that promotes stamina, strength and body suppleness.

Moran is also a patron of the Chertsey-based radio station, Hospital Radio Wey. In 2011, she supported the White Hat Rally to raise funds for ChildLine.

In the 2019 Birthday Honours, Moran was awarded the British Empire Medal (BEM) "for charitable services."

== Bibliography ==
- Get Fit with the Green Goddess (BBC Publications, 1984)
- A More Difficult Exercise (Bloomsbury, 1989) – Moran's autobiography and story of her successful fight against breast cancer
- The Bottom Line (Sidgwick & Jackson, 1989)
- Look Good Feel Great (Jarrold, 1989)
- A More Difficult Exercise (Bloomsbury, 1990)
- Daytime Live (BBC Publications, 1990)
- Ease into Fitness (Boxtree, 1993)
- Bone Boosters (Boxtree, 1993)
- Bone Boosters (Boxtree, 1995)
- Fresh Face – the easy way to look 10 years younger (Hamlyn, 2005)
- Live Longer, Feel Younger (Hamlyn, 2005)

== Video ==
- Easy Fit with Diana Moran (Green Umbrella, 2010)
