= Glen Neath =

Glen Neath is a British novelist, theatre-maker and artist. His first book, The Outgoing Man, which launched Portobello Books in 2005, was shortlisted for the Author's Club First Novel Award. His second novel, The Fat Plan, was published in July 2008. Ring, his collaboration with David Rosenberg, toured the UK in 2012 and visits the BAC in London in March 2013. Hannah Ringham's Free Show (bring money) by Glen Neath premiered at the BAC in London, featured as part of the British Council Edinburgh Festival Showcase in 2011 and transferred to the Soho Theatre in London.

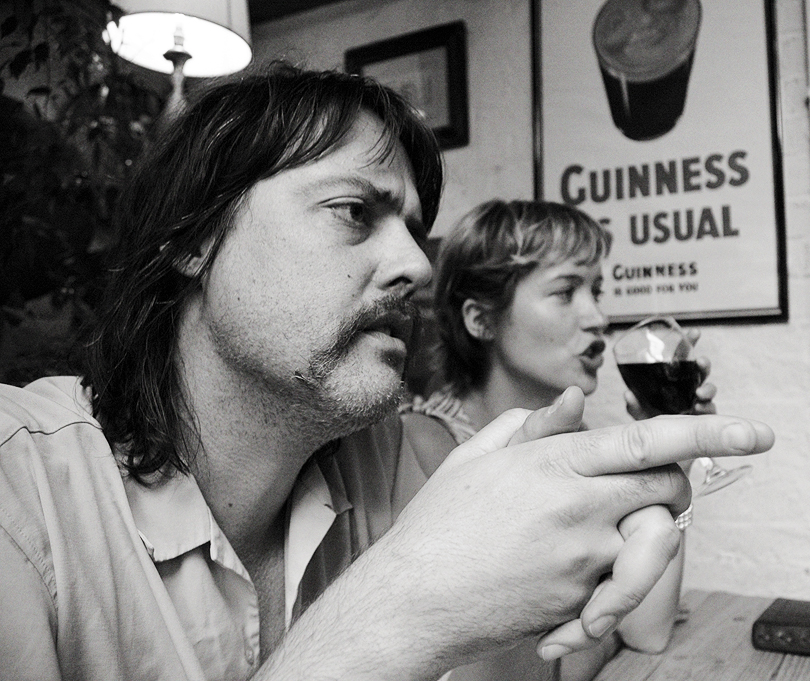
Neath in 2005

Hide, a collaboration with Lizzie Clachan, was featured in the programme that re-opened the Royal Festival Hall in London after its refurbishment in 2007. Romcom, a collaboration with Ant Hampton's company Rotozaza, has been produced (between 2003 and 2011) in ten countries. Their second collaboration, "The Bench", premiered in Norwich in May 2010 and has since toured to Belgium, the Netherlands and Spain. It was revamped as "Hello for Dummies" in 2011 and following its premiere in Lincoln visited Auckland in New Zealand.

His adaptation of Max Frisch's novel Gantenbein premiered in Berlin in 2005 and transferred to Zurich.

His radio plays, Listen Up (2009), Six Impossible Things (2010), Occupied (with John Jordan, 2012) and "The Long Count" (2012), produced by Boz Temple Morris for Holy Mountain, were broadcast on BBC Radio 4. He was selected as one of 10 writers commissioned to produce a short piece in response to the Austrian fortress at Fortezza for Manifesta7, the European Biennial of Contemporary Art which took place across four locations in Trentino-South Tyrol, Italy in 2008. His sound installation, Body considering its pains, was presented at the home of the experimental London-based theatre company Shunt and subsequently at the ICA and as part of the First Fortnight Festival in Dublin.

Other plays include Closer to Ormsby, The highs and lows of owning your own home, The Superheroes, "Cuckoo" and "Untitled" (both of which received rehearsed readings at the Royal Court Theatre) and "End of the Round" which featured in the London New Playwrights Festival.
