= Rigor Mortis (radio) =

- Radio 4's promotional shot of Peter Davison as Dr. Anthony Webster
- Genre: sitcom
- Running time: 30 minutes
- Country of origin: United Kingdom
- Language: English
- Home station: BBC Radio 4
- Syndicates: BBC Radio 7
- Starring: Peter Davison; Geoffrey Whitehead; Tracy-Ann Oberman series 1 Matilda Ziegler series 2.3 co-starring Marianne Levy; Tom Price; Gus Brown
- Created by: Laurence Howarth
- Written by: Laurence Howarth
- Produced by: Dawn Ellis
- Original release: 12 June 2003 – 2 March 2006
- No. of series: 3
- No. of episodes: 18
- Audio format: Stereophonic sound Recorded live in front of a studio audience
- Opening theme: Paul Mottram with vocals by Stephanie Benavente
- Ending theme: same
- Website: Radio 4

Rigor Mortis is a BBC Radio 4 black comedy produced in three seasons between 2003 and 2006, and set in the pathology department at an NHS hospital. It centres on the working lives of the pathologists and attendant staff who work in the department.

== Themes ==
Much of the humour of the show springs from the characters' varying views on death and their contrasting beliefs about the relative importance of their work. The show often derives humour from the fact that the characters are not primarily forensic pathologists. Davison's character, Anthony Webster, is frequently at pains to explain that he is a histopathologist, for example. Their case load therefore infrequently verges into the more "exciting" area of crime-related death. Nevertheless, one of the running gags of the programme was that the character originally played by Tracy-Ann Oberman (and in later series by Matilda Ziegler), the anatomical pathologist Ruth Anderson, was secondarily credentialled as a forensic pathologist, but had so rarely used these skills that her deductive reasoning skills were faulty.

Two other major themes can be seen throughout the history of the programme. One is the desire, especially on the part of Donaldson and Webster, to educate the public about pathology. Various schemes, notably including the first radio broadcast of an autopsy, are hatched to accomplish this goal. Another predominant theme is the effect of a career in pathology on the personal lives of its practitioners. This is especially evident in Series 3 where every character has at least one subplot revolving around the issue. Chief among these is the series-long arc in which Ruth and Anthony try to conceive a child non-sexually — he because his relationship with his naturally-conceived daughter has fallen into ruin, and she because of an inability to sustain a meaningful romantic relationship with a man.

Because of the inclusion of several recurring characters who are not practising pathologists, but rather administrative or laboratory staff, the programme can also be classed as an office comedy in the vein of the television programmes, 30 Rock, The Thin Blue Line and NewsRadio.

== Characters ==
Rigor Mortis employs a two-tiered ensemble structure, with the majority of the narrative surrounding the actions of the three pathologists, and the other recurring characters being used to further the actions of the main three characters. This structure is confirmed by the announced credits, which mention only the actors playing the pathologists during the opening title sequence.

=== Pathologists ===
- Dr. Anthony Webster (Peter Davison) — Webster is the one person in the office who is completely happy with his job. He's dreamed of being a pathologist since his youth, and indeed was mentored in his craft by his father. He has no illusions about what the job is or could be, and is never happier than when performing autopsies. So keen is his love for his speciality in histopathology, that he has been known to examine his own tissue samples, simply because there's nothing good on TV. For all of his scientific brilliance, he has great difficulty with the parts of life that occur outside the mortuary. This is exemplified by his relationship with his teenaged daughter, around whom he is extremely awkward. His zeal for pathology has instilled in him a sense of detachment from life, to the extent that he cannot form what many would consider "normal" interpersonal relationships. He is the nominal chief pathologist, although since there are ostensibly only two practising pathologists in the department, this title has little practical relevance. His ex-wife is not a featured character, although she does finally appear in the penultimate episode of Series 3.
- Dr. Ruth Anderson (Tracy-Ann Oberman, Matilda Ziegler) — Ruth's approach to pathology is decidedly more relaxed than that of Dr. Webster. She is frequently portrayed as bored by the overwhelming number of cases that come into her mortuary, as they generally reveal only natural causes of death. She is the only licensed forensic pathologist on staff, but this credential has gone mostly unused. Where Webster was drawn to pathology for serious scientific and familial reasons, she chose the career path apparently because of its romanticisation in popular culture. When the odd forensic case does arrive, she's quick to dust off her credentials, and equally quick to draw the wrong conclusions. Her search for romance has also been the subject of various subplots.
- Professor Graeme Donaldson (Geoffrey Whitehead) — Donaldson is the administrative head of the department, and therefore the boss of Webster and Anderson. Though he is a qualified pathologist, he rarely gets involved in actual autopsies. He is generally used to introduce new staff policies or NHS directives, which Webster and Anderson must then implement.

=== Supporting staff ===
- Gordon McCallister (Tom Price) — Gordon is the lab assistant, who's stayed with the department long beyond his six-month training rotation. He is frequently depicted as an over-user of alcohol, though it's not implied that he is, in fact, an alcoholic. Rather, he's just seen as enjoying a good party. However, he frequently has memory loss after a serious bender, including one incident where he began receiving threatening notes from an anonymous enemy, only to find that he wrote the notes himself during a blackout. He is often portrayed as somewhat afraid of the staff secretary, Chloe. His relationship with Webster is complex, at once admiring of the pathologist's professional skills, but somewhat dismissive of him personally. He almost always refers to his seniors by their titles and the first letter of their last name, as in, "Dr. W." or "Dr. A."
- Chloe Montague (Marianne Levy) — Chloe is the secretary at the department and openly dismissive of the educational gulf between herself and the pathologists. She frequently gives advice on personal matters to all the other characters, but takes affront if the advice isn't followed. She is somewhat catty with Ruth.
- Sgt. Simon Oliver (Gus Brown) — Simon is the local police officer with whom the pathology department are in most regular contact. He has a bit of a crush on Chloe. His fear of death and the dead make him utterly unsuited to be the department's liaison with the police.

== Production and broadcast ==
Rigor Mortis was recorded live in front of a studio audience at London's Drill Hall, typically at the rate of one episode each Friday night for six weeks. Little, if any, post-production work was applied to the recording. It was produced in three series over the course of four years. Each series contained six episodes. Series 1 was broadcast from 12 June to 17 July 2003. Series 2 went out from 11 November to 16 December 2004. Series 3 hit the airwaves from 26 January to 2 March 2006. Series 1 was subsequently rebroadcast on Radio 7 prior to the start of each subsequent series on Radio 4. Series 2 was not rebroadcast until mid-2007.

The sixth episode of series 3 was purported to be the programme's last.

Individual episodes were not titled, either by the voice-over announcer or the programme guide listings.

The character of Dr. Ruth Anderson was recast after the end of the first series.

== Reception ==
The first series of Rigor Mortis was well-received, cited as "brilliantly funny" and selected as the radio "Pick of the Day" by The Independent. The Sunday Times said Rigor was "wonderfully funny . . . the wit flashes as brightly as the scalpels", while Sue Arnold of The Observer wrote that it was "the sharpest, blackest and most original sitcom I've heard in years."

== Availability in other media ==
Rigor Mortis has never been released on CD or audio cassette; however, all three series are currently available in one volume for purchase and download/streaming on Audible. For a time after the initial broadcast of each episode, it was available for replay on the Radio 4 website. When the show was rebroadcast on BBC Radio 7 in 2007, it was again made available on the BBC Radio Player and re-broadcast in 2011 on BBC Radio 4 Extra.

According to writer Laurence Howarth's agent, a script was in development for a televised version, as of 2006. The project seemed to still be in development as of 25 March 2007 but appears to since have gone into abeyance, with the website no longer live.
