= Overseas Property TV =

Ownership
- Owner: Produced by Rapid Broadcast Ltd for MRI Media

History
- Launched: 1 September 2006
- Closed: January 2009

Links
- Website: overseaspropertytv.com

Overseas Property TV (OPTV or O'seasproperty, as it appeared on the EPG) was a television channel broadcast in the United Kingdom and Ireland, on the Sky Digital and Freesat platforms.

The channel offered a schedule of original programming from 7:00 a.m. to 1:00 a.m. daily. The channel was targeted at UK and Ireland residents wishing to buy, sell and develop property abroad (particularly the Mediterranean region, Eastern Europe and Florida). The channel also offered programming about relocating to other countries, legal advice and property investment tips. The schedule was peppered with travelogues, celebrity chat and cookery shows.

Founded by Wendy Macanthony, the channel was ownded by MacAnthony Realty International Group (MRI)—a company formed by Darragh MacAnthony. Although predominantly a lifestyle channel, commercial breaks and sales hours were used as a publicity vehicle for MRI.

The channel's programming was original and produced by Rapid Broadcast Ltd for MRI Media. Luisa Tramontano was executive producer for Rapid Broadcast, overseeing the channel from its launch until its demise. Wendy MacAnthony was in charge of MRI Media. The channel averaged a million monthly viewers and was BARB rated.

The channel closed and was removed from the Sky and Freesat EPG's in January 2009; the company was liquidated the same year.

== Magazine ==
A magazine was launched alongside the channel in September 2006. The OPTV magazine was sold in WHSmith stores and high street supermarkets; it was edited by Stewart Anderson.

== List of programmes ==
=== Destination Lunch ===
"Destination Lunch" looked at popular overseas destinations. The programme was hosted by Christine Hamilton and Neil Hamilton. The show also featured Paul Bloxham and occasionally, celebrity guests.

=== The Real... ===
Hosted by Amy Garcia and Richard Orford, the programme investigated the cultures of Italy, Berlin, Bulgaria and other countries; it also looked at some properties and legal advice.

=== The Property Market ===
The programme offered insights into different countries' property ladders and how to get on them; the show also looked at different properties based on price. "The Property Market" was hosted by Shauna Lowry and Nigel Leck.

=== Head to Head ===
In the programme, hosts Toyah Willcox and Richard Orford went head to head to champion their preferred country; only one country could win. The programme features dishes cooked by Paul Bloxham and Sam Watherstone.

=== Around the World ===
"Around the World" was a programme in which hosts Amy Garcia, Lee MacDonald, Kevin Duala and Michelle Watt tried to find properties around the world for sale for the best value.

=== The Ultimate Overseas Property Seminar ===
A programme in which Martin Roberts, with help from award-winning property law expert John Howell, brought advice for overseas properties.

=== Property Kings ===
"Property Kings" looked at the stories of successful entrepreneurs in the overseas property market; it was hosted by John Daly.

=== Overseas Property News ===
Presented by Jon Briggs, it rounded up the biggest property and travel global news stories of the week.

=== How to Purchase Abroad ===
A programme that featured guides on making property investments and purchasing second homes abroad. It was hosted by Des Clarke and Diana Moran with legal advice from expert Stefano Lucatello.

=== Ask the Property Experts ===
In the programme, John Daly answered questions relating to overseas property purchases, with help from property experts.

=== 72 ===
In "72", Brendan Courtney and Stewart Castledine would have just 72 hours to find holiday homes for people.

=== Property Boot Camp ===
"Property Boot Camp" was a show in which hosts James Max and Kevin Duala found suitable homes for people on a tight budget.

=== Relocation Clinic ===
A show in which David Grant and Carrie Grant, with support from resident lawyer Stefano Lucatello, answered questions relating to relocation.

=== Profit from Property ===
"Profit from Property" gave advice on moving into property rental, hosted by Tris Payne and James Max.

=== Women in the Property Market ===
Sue Haywood and Sunita Shroff looked at successful women's stories in the property market and some helpful advice.

=== Snap ===
Hosted by John Daly and a celebrity guest, "Snap" looked at people's first homes and compared the current prices to the prices when they were bought.

=== Hot Nights, Cool Places ===
Cat Porter, Andy Jaye and Sarah Matravers provided information, inspiration and entertainment for great nights overseas.

=== Paradise Abroad ===
"Paradise Abroad", hosted by Jon Briggs and Trish Lynch, looked at the best exotic destinations from around the world.

=== Property Pensions ===
The programme gave successful people's advice on starting a property pension, hosted by James Max and Sian Jones.

=== Retire Abroad ===
"Retire Abroad" investigated the best retirement destinations and guides, hosted by Peter Purves and Diana Moran.

=== Where in the World ===
Comedy panel game show in which a panel tried to guess the location of a mystery guest's property. Presented by Richard Orford.

=== MRI's Top 5 Buys ===
A programme that followed the latest MRI developments around the world, presented by Jon Dixon and MRI marketing experts.

=== Invest While You Rest ===
Hosted by Jon Dixon and Malandra Burrows, "Invest While You Rest" offered potential property investments and house tours.

=== Invest In ===
In the show, Gigi Morley and James McCourt looked at holiday destinations with excellent investment potential.

=== Buy the Best ===
Hosted by Anoushka Williams and Milo McCabe, the programme showcased two international property developments, with the help of MRI's leading experts.

=== Buy In ===
With his regular MRI experts, James McCourt looked at overseas locations with excellent holiday home or investment potential.

=== Buy MRI for... ===
"Buy MRI for...", hosted by James McCourt and Anoushka Williams, investigated wise investment opportunities with some help from MRI's leading experts.

=== Hot Property Alert ===
"Hot Property Alert" showcased potentially investable destinations, hosted by John Dixon and guests.

=== Inspection Trip ===
Jeremy Milnes went to MRI to investigate what happens when inspection trips are booked to find dream homes.

=== Why Buy MRI? ===
The programme guided people on purchasing properties from MRI developments, hosted by Craig Rowe and MRI experts.
