= Lizzie Clachan =

British theatre designer

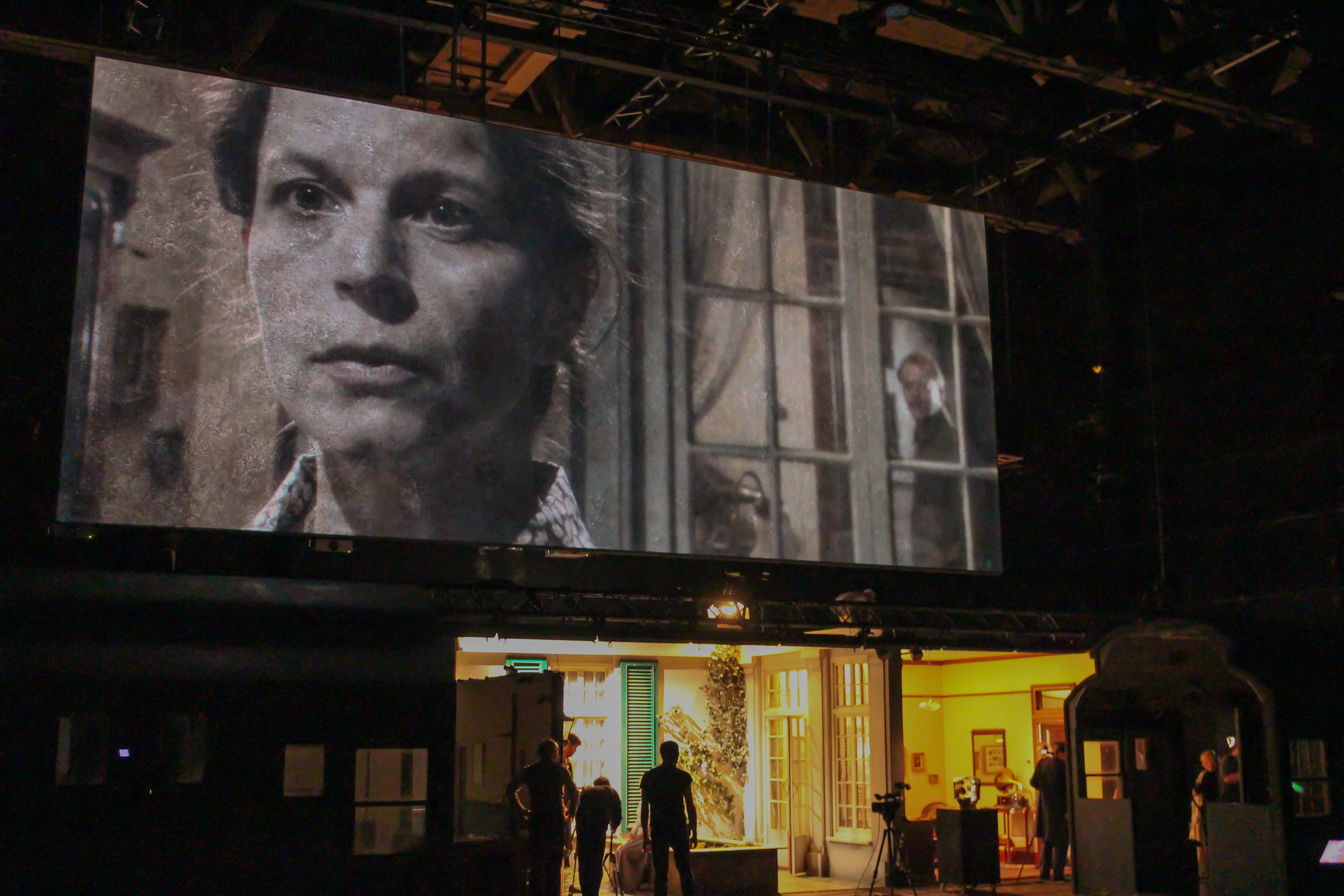
Salzburger Festspiele 2014 – The Forbidden Zone

Lizzie Clachan is a British theatre designer. She has designed for many theatres in the United Kingdom, including London's West End, as well as across Europe. Clachan has worked at the National Theatre for several decades and prior to that, worked with the alternative theater company, Shunt.

== Career ==
In 1998, Clachan was a co-founder of the theater company, Shunt, and designed all of their productions including The Architects, Money, Tropicana, Amato Saltone, Ether Frolics, Dance Bear Dance, The Ballad of Bobby Francois and The Tennis Show. Clachan designed Yerma (2016, Young Vic), The Truth (Menier Chocolate Factory/ West End) and The Suppliant Woman (Royal Lyceum/ATC).

Variety praised Clachan's set design for the 2013 performance of Port at the Lyttelton. She created a Mondrian-inspired set for the Wyndham Theatre's performance of The Letter in 2007. The New York Times called Clachan's set design on Macbeth (2015–16) a "startling coup de théâtre." For Yerma, the New York Times wrote that the set design, using glass siding, helped convey the themes of "private grief and public exposure." The Times described her set design for Ladybird (2004) by Vassily Sigarev, as "so lifelike you almost believe you could move in."

Clachan is known for her collaborations with director Katie Mitchell including The Forbidden Zone (Salzburg Festival/Schaubühne Berlin), A Sorrow Beyond Dreams (Burgtheater Vienna), Frank Martin's Le Vin herbé (Staatsoper im Schiller Berlin), The Rings of Saturn (Schauspiel Cologne) and Wastwater (Royal Court/Vienna Festival). Clachan's work with Mitchell on A Woman Killed With Kindness was considered well done by Daily Variety, when the stage was split into parallel sets. Her work on The Forbidden Zone (2016), was called "haunting" by The Guardian. Her designs for The Beaux Stratagem, were "integral to the Restoration comedy's success," according to Exeunt Magazine. The set for The Beaux' Stratagem was convertible, "with many doors and a long and serpentine staircase."

In 2011, Clachan won 'Best Design' at the Theatre Awards UK for Happy Days at Sheffield Crucible Theatre.

== Set and costume design credits ==
- 2004, Set design, Ladybird, Royal Court Theatre.
- 2006, Set design, Woman and Scarecrow, Royal Court Theatre
- 2007, Set design, The Letter, Wyndham Theatre.
- 2011, Set design, Happy Days, Sheffield Crucible Theatre.
- 2011, Set design, A Woman Killed With Kindness, Lyttelton.
- 2011, Set design and costumes, Wastwater, Royal Court Theater.
- 2012, Set design and costumes, Die Ringe des Saturn, Festival D'Avignon.
- 2013, Set design, Port, Lyttelton.
- 2013, Set design and costumes, Longing, Hampstead Theater.
- 2015, Set design, Treasure Island, Orcas Center.
- 2015, Set design, As You Like It, National Theatre.
- 2015, Set design, Carmen, Almeida Theatre.
- 2015, Set design, The Beaux' Stratagem, National's Olivier Theater.
- 2015, Set design, The Skriker, Royal Exchange Theatre.
- 2015-16, Set design, Macbeth, Young Vic Theatre.
- 2016, Set design, Yerma
- 2016, Set design, The Forbidden Zone, Schaubühne Berlin.
- 2017, Set design, The Truth, Menier Chocolate Factory
- 2018, Set design, Cyprus Avenue, The Public Theater
- 2020, Set design, Blindness, Donmar Warehouse
- 2022, Set design, Lucia di Lammermoor, Lincoln Center
- 2023, Set design, Days of Wine and Roses
- 2023, Set design, The Witches, National Theatre
