= Cain's Jawbone =

Murder mystery puzzle book

- Front cover of Unbound edition
- Author: Edward Powys Mathers as "Torquemada"
- Language: English
- Subject: Puzzle book
- Publisher: Victor Gollancz Ltd (1934 edition); Unbound (2019 edition)
- Publication date: 1934
- Publication place: United Kingdom
- Media type: Hardback
- Pages: 100
- ISBN: 978-1783527410

Cain's Jawbone is a murder mystery puzzle written by Edward Powys Mathers under the pseudonym "Torquemada". It is a 100-page book with all its pages out of order, and the player is tasked with finding the correct order. The puzzle was first published in 1934 as part of The Torquemada Puzzle Book. In 2019, crowdfunding publisher Unbound published a new stand-alone edition of the puzzle in collaboration with the charity The Laurence Sterne Trust.

Both editions, when published, were accompanied by a competition which offered a cash prize to the first reader to solve the puzzle. Cain's Jawbone has been described as "one of the hardest and most beguiling word puzzles ever published."

== Title ==
The phrase Cain's Jawbone refers to the Biblical stories of Cain and Abel and Samson.. Specifically, the title is a reference to Act V, Scene 1 of Hamlet, when Hamlet says "That skull had a tongue in it, and could sing once. How the knave jowls it to the ground, as if 'twere Cain's jawbone, that did the first murther!".

== Puzzle ==
The puzzle consists of a 100-page prose narrative with its pages arranged in the wrong order. The first edition is part of a hardcover book. The second edition is a boxed set of page-cards. To solve the puzzle, the reader must determine the correct order of the pages and also the names of the murderers and victims within the story. The story's text includes a large number of quotations, references, puns, Spoonerisms and other word games. The pages can be arranged in 9.33×10^{157} (factorial of 100) possible combinations, but there is only one correct order. The solution to the puzzle has never been made public.

== Competitions ==
When the puzzle was first published in 1934, a prize of £25 (equivalent to £928 in 2025) was offered to the first reader who could reorder the pages and provide an account of the six persons murdered in Cain's Jawbone and the full names of their murderers. Two people, Mr S. Sydney-Turner and Mr W. S. Kennedy, solved the puzzle in 1935 and won £25 each. A third person also solved the puzzle in 1935 and received a note of congratulations from Mathers, but did not win a prize. This solver contacted the Historical Library of Shandy Hall in 2016, after the library sent out a public request for the puzzle's solution.

Unbound, the publishers of the 2019 edition, ran the competition a second time, saying "The prize of £1,000 (roughly how much £15 was worth in 1934) will be given to the first reader to provide the names of the murderers and the murdered, the correct order of the pages and a short explanation of how the solution was obtained. The competition will run for one year from the date of publication."

In November 2020, it was announced that comedian and crossword compiler John Finnemore had correctly solved the puzzle, doing so over a span of six months during the COVID-19 lockdown. Finnemore said "The first time I had a look at it I quickly thought 'Oh this is just way beyond me.' The only way I'd even have a shot at it was if I were for some bizarre reason trapped in my own home for months on end, with nowhere to go and no-one to see. Unfortunately, the universe heard me".

== Popular reception ==
In 1934, Victor Gollancz Ltd printed 4,000 copies of Cain's Jawbone, but there is no record of actual sales. In the Gollancz publication, Cain's Jawbone was only one among other puzzles. Since that time, the book, and interest in it, lay dormant until 2019.

According to The Washington Post, "In its first year on the market in 2019, Cain's Jawbone sold roughly 4,000 copies." Interest was indifferent, but the same article credits subsequent sky-rocketing sales to Sarah Scannell following her publication of videos documenting her progress toward solving Cain's Jawbone on TikTok, as well as the near-simultaneous announcement that comedian and crossword compiler John Finnemore had solved the puzzle.

According to The Guardian, sales have topped 500,000 as of the beginning of 2023.

== Critical reception ==
The Laurence Sterne Trust has used the increased popularity of Cain's Jawbone in the early 2020s to promote experimental forms in the novel.

== "The Researcher's First Murder" ==
In 2024, Unbound (the publisher of the 2019 edition) published a spiritual successor to Cain's Jawbone. Entitled "The Researcher's First Murder", the puzzle was written by John Finnemore, the winner of the 2019 competition. It was initially published as a box of 100 cards each with a text side (to be correctly ordered into a narrative) and a picture side (forming a set of puzzles connected to the narrative). Along with Cain's Jawbone, there was an initial competition to correctly solve the puzzle with a prize of £1,000 to the first correct solution and £250 to a random other correct solution submitted by 28 February 2025.
