= Stephanie Cole =

English actress (1941–2026)

Stephanie Cole OBE
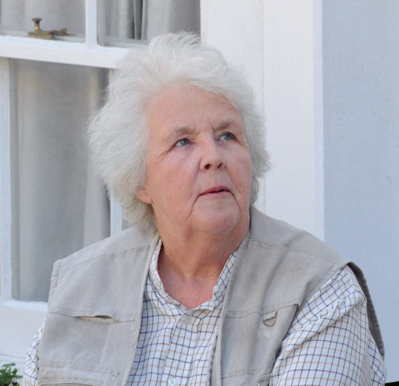
- Cole filming Doc Martin in Port Isaac, June 2009
- Born: Patricia Stephanie Cole; 5 October 1941; Solihull, Warwickshire, England
- Died: 18 September 2026 (aged 84)
- Occupation: Actress
- Years active: 1958–2022
- Spouses: Henry Marshall (m. 1973; div. 1988) Peter Birrel (m. 1998; died 2004)
- Children: 1

Patricia Stephanie Cole (5 October 1941 – 18 September 2026) was an English stage, television, radio and film actress, known for high-profile roles in shows such as Tenko (1981–1985), Open All Hours (1982–1985), A Bit of a Do (1989), Waiting for God (1990–1994), Keeping Mum (1997–1998), Doc Martin (2004–2009), Ed Reardon's Week (2005–2021), Cabin Pressure (2008–2014), Coronation Street (2011–2013), Still Open All Hours (2013–2019), and Man Down (2014–2017).

== Early life ==
Patricia Stephanie Cole was born in Solihull, Warwickshire, on 5 October 1941. She trained at the Bristol Old Vic Theatre School from 1958 to 1960 and went on to consolidate her acting skills in repertory theatres around the United Kingdom. In one of her first roles, in drama school at the age of 17, she played the eccentric, elderly medium Madame Arcati in Noël Coward's Blithe Spirit. At the age of 63 she returned to the same role when the play was revived at the West End's Savoy Theatre in 2004.

== Career ==
One of Cole's most recognised and popular roles was of Dr Beatrice (Bea) Mason in the 1980s television series Tenko, a drama which chronicled the lives of British women in Singapore after the Japanese invasion and their consequent confinement in a Japanese prisoner of war camp. The starkly realistic series was explicit in its portrayal of the horrific conditions and brutality faced by the women during their imprisonment, and dealt with issues such as rape, stillbirth, lesbianism, suicide, abortion and euthanasia. Cole played the role of the stern, officious yet kindly doctor over three series and a one-off special between 1981 and 1985.

During this same period, Cole also played the elderly, paranoid and morose customer Mrs Delphine Featherstone, nicknamed "The Black Widow", in the BBC comedy Open All Hours. Mrs Featherstone was the only rival to Nurse Gladys Emmanuel for the affections of shopkeeper Arkwright, played by Ronnie Barker (who had recommended her to play the part after seeing her in Tenko), although she was attracted to him only because she liked his stingy ways. Arkwright was scared of her advances and often hid when he saw her approaching the shop. Cole was actually only in her early forties when she took the role; playing characters much older than she actually was (notably in Waiting for God) became a hallmark of her career.

In 1988, Cole joined actresses Thora Hird, Maggie Smith, Julie Walters and Patricia Routledge in the award-winning first series of Talking Heads, featuring dramatic monologues written for BBC Television by British playwright Alan Bennett. Cole performed the role of Muriel to great acclaim during the half-hour monologue "Soldiering On". In later years, Cole would repeat her performance of this now famous monologue on both the London stage and for BBC Radio.

Cole played bad-tempered retired photojournalist Diana Trent in the sitcom Waiting for God, which ran from 1990 to 1994. Although Diana was supposed to be a pensioner, Cole was actually 48 years old when she took the role, for which she received the 1992 Best TV Comedy Actress award at the British Comedy Awards.

From 2004 to 2009, Cole appeared with Martin Clunes and Caroline Catz in the ITV comedy-drama, Doc Martin as Joan Norton, aunt of Clunes' character Dr Martin Ellingham. In 2006, Cole starred with Victoria Wood in the World War II drama Housewife, 49 as Mrs Waite, the local head of what was then the WVS. Cole also had a small role in the 2008 romantic comedy Miss Pettigrew Lives for a Day as Miss Pettigrew's grumpy boss, Miss Holt.

In April 2011, Cole joined the cast of Coronation Street, playing Sylvia Goodwin, the mother of regular character Roy Cropper. In August 2012, she was cast in an adaptation of the 1938 thriller film The Lady Vanishes on the BBC.

In August 2013, it was announced that Cole had left Coronation Street. It was initially speculated that her sudden departure was due to illness but Cole later confirmed on Twitter that her already pending departure had been brought forward due to her brother's death.

From 2013 to 2019, Cole reprised her role as Delphine Featherstone in Still Open All Hours. She appeared with original actors David Jason, Lynda Baron and Maggie Ollerenshaw.

On Halloween 2018, Cole guest starred in the live episode of Inside No 9 entitled "Dead Line", playing the role of Moira O'Keefe.

In 2019 Cole appeared in the BBC One comedy Scarborough.

=== Stage ===
Cole also performed as a stage actress for more than fifty years. On the West End stage, she featured in The Mousetrap in 1968 (Ambassadors Theatre) as Miss Casewell, Noises Off in 1983 (Savoy Theatre), Steel Magnolias in 1989 (Lyric Theatre) and Quartet in 1999 (Albery Theatre). Her most prominent stage role was as Betty in the hit comedy A Passionate Woman written by Kay Mellor. The play, directed by Ned Sherrin, opened at the Comedy Theatre in 1994 and had an extended run. In 2003 a national tour of Rosamunde Pilcher's The Shell Seekers, where she starred as the lead matriarch of the family, Penelope Keeling, was received with great acclaim.

=== Radio ===
Cole appeared in several radio series. She starred in the BBC Radio 4 comedy Cabin Pressure as Carolyn Knapp-Shappey, opposite Benedict Cumberbatch and Roger Allam, written by and featuring John Finnemore. She also featured in the BBC Radio 4 comedy, Ed Reardon's Week as Olive, a student in Ed's writing class. She also played opposite Hugh Bonneville in the sci-fi comedy Married. In 2017, she starred as Queen Victoria in an episode of John Finnemore's Double Acts on Radio 4.

=== Other ===
In 1998, Cole's career in comedy was commemorated in the BBC documentary series Funny Women. In the same year, Cole's autobiography A Passionate Life was published. The book's foreword was written by British theatre director Ned Sherrin. In 2020, she appeared as Ruby Dameril in an episode of Mike Wozniak's podcast St Elwick's Neighbourhood Association Newsletter Podcast.

== Honours ==
In 2002, Cole was awarded an honorary Master of Arts degree from the University of Bristol. In 2005, she was made an Officer of the Order of the British Empire (OBE) in the Queen's Birthday Honours List for her services to drama, the elderly and mental health charities.

Cole was voted Solihull's favourite Silhillian in a competition run by Solihull Council in December 2006. She beat Lucy Davis, Martin Johnson and Richard Hammond to pick up the top crown in The S Factor.

== Charity work ==
Cole was an Ambassador for the medical charity Overseas Plastic Surgery Appeal. She was also an ambassador for the charity BRACE Dementia Research

== Personal life and death ==
In 1973, Cole married fight director Henry Marshall, who was one of the founders of the British Academy of Dramatic Combat and was a Master at Arms at the Royal Academy of Dramatic Art. They have a daughter (born 1973). The couple divorced in 1988. In 1998, Cole married fellow actor Peter Birrel after meeting him again, thirty years after they first appeared together in a production of Richard II at the Bristol Old Vic. Birrel died in 2004.

Cole died from complications of Alzheimer's disease on 18 September 2026, aged 84.

== Filmography ==
=== Film ===
Year	Title	Role	Notes
1975	Eskimo Nell	Traffic Warden	Uncredited
1978	International Velvet	Teacher	
1978	Building Sites Bite	Auntie	
1979	That Summer!	Mrs. Mainwaring	
1999	Grey Owl	Ada Belaney	
2008	Miss Pettigrew Lives for a Day	Miss Holt	
2022	The House	Great Aunt Eleanor	Voice

=== Television ===
Year	Title	Role	Notes	Ref.
1968	Z-Cars	Sick Woman	Episode: "Should Auld Acquaintance: Part 2"	
1968	Armchair Theatre	Betty	Episode: "A Very Fine Line"	
1969	Take Three Girls	Continuity Girl	Episode: "Stop Acting"	
1976	Bill Brand	Marjorie	Episode: "Anybody's"	
1976	Angels	Miss Hombro	Episode: "Facade"	
1977	The Velvet Glove	Sybil Thorndike	Episode: "Auntie's Niece"	
1977	Just William	Vicar's Wife	Episode: "William and the Prize Pig"	
1977	Murder Most English: A Flaxborough Chronicle	Sister Horton	Episode: "Hopjoy Was Here: Part 2"	
1977	The Fosters	Receptionist	Episode: "The Family Way"	
1978	Emmerdale	Mrs. Bulstrode	6 episodes	
1978	Within These Walls	Kitty Fenner	Episode: "Is There Anyone There?"	
1978	Betzi	Mrs. Balcombe	TV film	
1978	Lillie	Agnes Langtry	Episode: "America!"	
1979	Afternoon Off	Customer	TV film	
1979	Agony	Mrs. Manfield	Episode: "An Unmarried Couple"	
1980	Tales of the Unexpected	Miss Harrison	Episode: "The Flypaper"	
1981–1985	Tenko	Dr. Beatrice Mason	30 episodes	
1982	The Agatha Christie Hour	Princess Anna	Episode "Jane in search of a job"	
1982–1985	Open All Hours	Mrs Delphine Featherstone	10 episodes	
1983	Terry and June	Mrs Hunt	Episode: "Pardon My Dust"	
1986–1988	Return of the Antelope	Sarah Mincing		
1988	Talking Heads	Muriel	Episode: "Soldiering On"	
1989	A Bit of a Do	Betty Sillitoe	13 episodes	
1990–1994	Waiting for God	Diana Trent	47 episodes	
1991	About Face	Sheila	Episode: "Requiem"	
1991	Agatha Christie's Poirot	Mrs. Lacey	Episode: "The Theft of the Royal Ruby"	
1992–1994	Screen Two	Dame Lettie Colston/Alice	2 episodes	
1997–1998	Keeping Mum	Peggy Beare	16 episodes	
2001	Life As We Know It	Lizzie Cameron	7 episodes	
2001	Back Home	Lady Beatrice Langley	TV film	
2003	Doctors	Doris	Episode: "Gravy on That?"	
2003	Born and Bred	Prudence	Episode: "A Very Ormston Christmas"	
2004–2009	Doc Martin	Joan Norton	27 episodes	
2006	Housewife, 49	Mrs Waite	TV film	
2007	Midsomer Murders	Dorothy Hutton	Episode: "Death and Dust"	
2011–2013	Coronation Street	Sylvia Goodwin	161 episodes	
2011	George and Bernard Shaw	Hyacinth	Episode: "Pilot"	
2013–2019	Still Open All Hours	Mrs. Delphine Featherstone	41 episodes	
2013	The Lady Vanishes	Evelyn Floodporter	TV film	
2014–2017	Man Down	Nesta	18 episodes	
2016	Comedy Playhouse	Pearl	Episode: "Broken Biscuits"	
2018	Inside No. 9	Moira O'Keefe	Episode: "Dead Line"	(Note: Her apparent on-screen suicide during what was presented as a live TV broadcast caused a flurry of (later reverted) edits to this, her Wikipedia page, while the programme was still on the air, recording the date of her "death".)
2019–2022	Gentleman Jack	Aunt Ann Walker	7 episodes	
2019	Scarborough	Marion	6 episodes	
2021	The Cleaner	Vivienne Hosier	Episode: "The Aristocrat"	

== Awards ==
- 1992 British Comedy Awards – Best TV Comedy Actress for Waiting for God
- 2012 British Soap Awards – Best Comedy Performance for Coronation Street
