= James Max =

British journalist

James Max (born 20 May 1970) is a journalist, TV and radio presenter specialising in current affairs and business issues. He currently serves as President of the Royal Albert Hall, having been elected in May 2025, chairing Council and is a trustee of the Hall of Arts and Sciences, better known as the Royal Albert Hall. He is a regular contributor and panellist on The Jeremy Vine Show on Channel 5 and on Jeremy Vine's Radio 2 Show. A regular columnist for the FT Financial Times since 2017, his entertaining take on matters of life and money have garnered him a reputation for entertaining but incisive columns.

James presented the Early Breakfast Show from 5 am to 6.30 am on TalkTV between 2018 and 2025 and was a regular contributor to The Talk on TalkTV and was the lead presenter on PrimeTime in the last few month's of the station. Other programmes he's presented include the Early Breakfast on BBC Radio London and the Weekend Breakfast Show for London speech radio station LBC until August 2013. He announced on Twitter "A wonderful 7 1/2 years. Sadly, all good things come to an end. Not my choice. But, for now, it’s goodbye to you at the weekends and to LBC". He was a semi-finalist on the first series of the British version of The Apprentice television programme.

He is also an advisor on many property and business projects providing advice on business development, social and digital media. Max was an executive director of BNP Paribas Real Estate, heading four of their business lines and was on the UK Board. He has also been an advisor to Stanhope, the developer who purchased the former BBC Television Centre in West London, presented the monthly Estates Gazette podcast, Real Talk. Max is currently Chair of the M7 Regional E-Warehouse REIT.

== Early life ==
Born in London in May 1970, James Max is the youngest of four brothers. He was educated at St Paul's School, leaving in July 1988 with three A-levels. After a gap year he went to the University of Reading, graduating in 1992 with a first-class BSc honours degree in Land Management.

== Career ==
=== Chartered Surveyor ===
Max joined property advisors DTZ to undertake professional training to become a Chartered Surveyor. He passed his Assessment of Professional Competence (APC) in 1994 and became a member of the Royal Institution of Chartered Surveyors (MRICS). In 1995 he became an associate director, and in 1997 was promoted to director.

Whilst at DTZ, he worked with Rob Andrew, the former England rugby fly-half, in the international investment team. In 1998, he joined the London arm of US investment bank Morgan Stanley. He worked on a range of projects including the £1.54 billion securitisation of British Land's Broadgate office scheme in the city of London and the successful defence and subsequent property restructuring for Marks and Spencer plc.

=== The Apprentice ===
Max was a semi-finalist in the first series of reality TV show The Apprentice. Screened on BBC Two in 2005, contestants competed for a £100,000-a-year job as "apprentice" to British business magnate Lord Alan Sugar. He was a project manager three times during the show. He was on the winning team in eight out of a possible ten tasks (a feat since matched by Lucinda Ledgerwood). This included being on the winning team for six tasks in a row, making him the record holder for the highest number of successive wins on the programme until Series 7, when Helen Milligan exceeded this number. He was "fired" by Sugar in the interview round (episode 11). In his autobiography, Lord Sugar states he fired Max from "The Apprentice" as he felt he was using the show as a route into a media career. Max has, however, stated publicly that this was never his intention.

=== Media and broadcast ===
Since The Apprentice, Max has developed a career in media and broadcast whilst continuing his business activities.

From May 2006 until August 2013, Max presented on LBC. Initially presenting a weekly business show Business Matters, he has presented a range of shows on the station. In addition to Weekend Breakfast, he regularly covered for his colleagues before his sudden departure on 28 August 2013. He announced his departure on his Twitter feed making it clear that it was not his choice. During 2012, he covered for Nick Ferrari at Breakfast, James Whale's Drive, James O'Brien's mid-morning show, Julia Hartley Brewer's afternoon show and in October, he covered for Steve Allen's Early Breakfast, when Mr Allen took a week off to go to Las Vegas. Previously presenting the weekday Business Update on Talksport from April 2006 to May 2008, he also presented a range of late night, overnight and Saturday evening shows on the station.

In October 2007, Max started a 10-week run of a new Saturday show called The Finer Things in Life which aired, live, every Saturday night on the station between 5 pm and 6 pm. In January 2008, Max presented the Early Breakfast Show from 5 am to 7 am on Fridays and 6 am to 8 am on Saturdays.

Between 2007 and 2009, he presented and appeared as a regular panellist on Overseas Property TV. Max presents Property Week magazine's monthly podcast, and wrote a monthly lifestyle column entitled "Something for the Weekend" between 2005 and 2008.

Max reviewed the newspapers on Sky News between 2005 and 2020 becoming a regular on both the evening shows, Sunrise and on Adam Boulton's show. He is a current affairs commentator. He regularly appears as a pundit on Jeremy Vine's BBC Radio 2 Show and on his channel 5 morning TV programme.

He joined Talkradio in 2018 to present a weekday early breakfast news show from 5 am to 6.30 am. The show was broadcast on TalkTV live from the Talk studios.

Max is a regular columnist and contributor to the Financial Times. Writing about "Rich People's Problems" in the FT Money personal finance weekend section, Max covers a variety of topics of interest to FT readers with an irreverent and informative style and personal insights.

=== Royal Albert Hall ===
In 2012, Max was appointed to the council of the Hall of Arts and Sciences, better known as the Royal Albert Hall and in September was also appointed to the Programming and Marketing, Fundraising and PR and Reputational Management Committees. He now serves as the Hall's President.
