= Safety Catch =

BBC Radio 4 sitcom

- Genre: Sitcom
- Running time: 30 minutes
- Country of origin: United Kingdom
- Language: English
- Home station: BBC Radio 4
- Starring: Darren Boyd; Joanna Page; Sarah Smart; Brigit Forsyth; Lewis MacLeod
- Created by: Laurence Howarth
- Written by: Laurence Howarth; John Finnemore
- Produced by: Dawn Ellis
- Recording studio: Shaw Theatre, London
- Original release: 26 September 2007 – 26 November 2010
- No. of series: 3
- No. of episodes: 12
- Website: BBC Homepage

Safety Catch is a sitcom on BBC Radio 4 created by Laurence Howarth and written by Howarth and John Finnemore. The series was first broadcast in 2007. It is about Simon McGrath (played by Darren Boyd), a man who works in a job that he does not like – the arms trade. The show mocks issues of morality, although Howarth claims that the show is not satirical. Because of the subject matter and the light-hearted way it is treated, the series is one of Radio 4's most controversial. A second series was broadcast in April 2009.

== Plot ==
Simon McGrath, the narrator and anti-hero of the series, works as an arms dealer whose main job is selling arms to Gambia. Simon claims that he would prefer to work elsewhere, but due to a combination of laziness and cowardice he has failed to change to a job which is less problematic in terms of morality. He tries to do the good thing, such as donating blood and recycling, but he knows that he could do better. He tries to defend himself by saying that if he was not doing the job, then someone else would.

Simon's job puts strains on his relationships. His girlfriend Anna Greig (Joanna Page) wants to settle down and have a family with Simon, but it is mainly because it is easier than trying to find another boyfriend. Simon's sister, Judith (Sarah Smart), who works for Oxfam hates her brother's job and would like to disown him, but she cannot bring herself to do it. Angela (Brigit Forsyth), Simon's mother, does not mind the ethical implications surrounding her son's job as long he has a steady occupation. Simon's main colleague is Boris Kemal (Lewis MacLeod), who has no problem with the morality with his job, claiming that his work is a humanitarian service, once saying, "Give a man a fish and he can feed himself for a day. Give a man a gun and he can steal fish for the rest of his life." Despite his exotic name, Boris is actually a Scot who lives in Folkestone.

== Controversy ==
Safety Catch has attracted controversy due to its material. One listener complained to the BBC complaints show Feedback, saying that the show was, "Morally vacuous". However, after this complaint was broadcast, fans of the show wrote in to praise the show. In response, Howarth claimed that his aim in writing the series was just trying be funny, claiming that if the series was trying to be moral, then it would probably fail. Howarth also said that the series is not actually about the arms trade, but the life of someone who works in the arms trade. The producer of Safety Catch, Dawn Ellis, said that the arms trade is a subject that should not be avoided in comedy.

A listener also complained about the references to Gambia being the country to which the arms are dealt, despite the fact that Gambia is one of the most peaceful countries in Africa. Howarth said that he was writing it as though Gambia was on the brink of a war, not at war, because of a recent coup d'état in the country. Howarth also complained about people demanding that his show should be taken off the air, claiming it was censorship.

== Episodes ==
=== Series 1 (2007) ===
No. overall	No. in series	Title	Original release date
1	1	"Show Me You Care"	26 September 2007
This first episode introduces us to the life of Simon McGrath: a man who considers himself to be a good citizen, even though he works in the arms trade.
2	2	"A Wanting Man"	3 October 2007
Simon gets the impression that a woman he meets at an interview might be attracted to him, despite her being introduced to him by Judith, who described Simon as a, "morally contemptible worm".
3	3	"Loose Lips Sink Ships"	10 October 2007
Judith's new boyfriend Ol is discovered not to be all that he claims to be after Simon discovers that he has been taped giving out highly secret and sensitive information.
4	4	"Whatever Happened to the Unlikely Lad?"	17 October 2007
Simon is persuaded by Anna and his family to attend his school reunion, but he is determined to prevent his old school friends from finding out what he does for a living.

=== Series 2 (2009) ===
No. overall	No. in series	Title	Original release date
5	1	"Brothers In Arms"	1 April 2009
Simon tries to use his 'flair for original ideas' to prove to his colleagues and family just how bad he feels about his job.
6	2	"I Draw The Line"	8 April 2009
Simon finally quits his job, but the timing is poor as he and Anna soon discover that they might become parents.
7	3	"If A Job's Not Worth Doing"	15 April 2009
Simon discovers that he actually loves his job and even proposes to Anna. As a result, he decides to learn how to hate again.
8	4	"There Will Be Paint"	22 April 2009
Simon plans to show his work colleagues the true horrors of war by organising a paintball trip.

=== Series 3 (2010) ===
No. overall	No. in series	Title	Original release date
9	1	"Better The Devil You Know"	5 November 2010
An American company has placed a bid on Heathcote Sanders, and somehow Simon is offered a promotion
10	2	"What's My Motivation"	12 November 2010
Simon realises that his only fault is that he is not self-motivated enough.
11	3	"Uncomfortably Numb"	19 November 2010
Simon sets out to give himself compassion fatigue so that he can stop worrying and not feel guilty about all the bloodshed in the world.
12	4	"Unforgivable, That's What You Are"	26 November 2010
Heathcote Sanders are under the microscope when some of the weapons they sold to a hostile government are turned against the British.
