= Simon Kane (writer) =

British actor and writer

- Born: Simon Le Plastrier Kane
- Education: Clare College, Cambridge
- Occupations: Writer, Actor
- Relatives: John Kane (father); Alison Warner (mother); Susy Kane (sister)
- Writing career
- Years active: 1995 – present
- Website: slepkane.blogspot.com

Simon Kane is a British writer, actor, and associate artist with the Shunt cooperative working in radio, television and theatre. He is the son of actor and writer John Kane and opera singer Alison Warner. His sister, Susy Kane, is also an actor and writer.

Kane studied English literature at Clare College, Cambridge, graduating in 1997.

== Selected works ==
=== Television ===
| Year | Title | Role | Notes |
|---|---|---|---|
| 1985 | Daemon | | As Simon Kene |
| 2001 | The Inbetweeners | Dance teacher | |
| 2012 | The Bleak Old Shop of Stuff | Postman | Episode 1 |
| 2011–2013 | Peeder Jigson's Video Diary | Aidan Turner | Episodes: "What Aidan Turner's Up to in the Break", "Naming the Dwarves", " Wrap Party" |
| 2014 | Mirrorboy | Funkbeard | Short (also credited as writer, composer and editor) |
| 2016 | The Nightmare on Deskteeth Street | Harold | TV Short |
| 2017 | Suicide Hotline | Mr. Jameson | TV Short |
| 2019 | The Seeing | Perry | Episode: "Introduction" |
| 2019 | The Atticus McLaren Mysteries | Scout McLaren | |
| 2020 | Trying | Torturer | Series 1, Episode: "Someone Else's Kids" |
| 2020 | Death Meets Lisolette | Billy | TV Short |
| 2020 | Ghosts | Keith Darren Dean | Series 2, Episode: "Perfect Day" |
| 2021 | What's My Name? | Paramedic | TV Short |
| 2021 | Pretend Friends | Mark | TV Short |
| 2022 | EastEnders | Russell | Series 1, Episode 6558 |
| 2022 | Christmas Carole | Vicar | TV Movie |
| 2023 | Good Omens | Theatre Announcer | Series 2, Episode 4 |
| 2024 | Emmerdale | Driver | Series 1, Episode 9905 |

=== Theatre ===
| Year | Production | Role | Company | Notes |
|---|---|---|---|---|
| 2000 | The Tennis Show | Linesman | Shunt | |
| 2000 | Ophelia | Hamlet | SPID | |
| 2002 | The Al-Hamlet Summit | Polonius | Zaoum | |
| 2003 | Invitation to a Beheading | Lawyer, M. Pierre | Discreet Theatre | Review in Total Theatre Magazine |
| 2005 | The Prometheus Experiment | The Waiter | Discreet Theatre | Hoxton Hall |
| 2006 | A Christmas Carol | Scrooge | Bigfoot | |
| 2007 | Pride and Prejudice the panto | Bad Guy | The Mighty Fin | |
| 2008 | Contains Violence | Narrator / Murderer | | Lyric Theatre (Hammersmith) |
| 2008 | Oil Heart Mother | Simon | Present Tense 7 | Southwark Playhouse |
| 2008 | Hamlet (abridged) | Barnardo / Ghost / King / Polonius / Zeus | Rival Theatre Company | Etcetera Theatre |
| 2010 | The Diary of a Nobody | Pooter | The Mighty Fin | |
| 2011 | The Extremists | Dan | | Rehearsed Reading. Royal Court Theatre |
| 2012 | Alice in Wonderland | Caterpillar, Duchess, Hatter | Exquisite Folly | Review in The Guardian |
| 2013 | Life by Misadventure | Brendan / Brenda | Twice Shy Theatre | Latitude Festival |
| 2014 | Diary of a Provincial Lady | Robert | The Mighty Fin | |
| 2015 | Ritual of Thwarted Desire | Wycliff | Little Pieces of Gold | Southwark Playhouse |
| 2015 | Of Mice and Madness | Griffin | London Horror Festival | Etcetera Theatre |
| 2016 | The Buskers Opera | Mayor Lockitt | Buskers Opera Ltd | Park Theatre. Reviews |
| 2016 | Matter | Bird | Devil's Picnic | Etcetera Theatre |
| 2016 | Twelfth Night | Malvolio | Off Your Chump Theatre | |
| 2017 | The Monster Hunters | Sir Maxwell House, Count Orloff, Klaus | Newgate Productions | The Courtyard Theatre |
| 2017 | The Hound of the Baskervilles | Watson | | The English Theatre Frankfurt |
| 2018 | The Hound of the Baskervilles | Watson | | Jermyn Street Theatre. Review |
| 2019 | The Maid's Tragedy | Lysippus / Calianax | Royal Shakespeare Company | Workshop |
| 2021 | The Hound of the Baskervilles | Watson | | Octagon Theatre, Bolton |
| 2022 | Bleak Expectations | Gently Benevolent | | Watermill Theatre |
| 2022 | Love Goddess | Orson Welles, Harry Cohn | | Cockpit Theatre, Marylebone |

=== Radio / voice ===
- 2004: The Xtra Factor (voice-overs)
- 2010: Six Impossible Things
- 2012: Occupied
- 2011–2021: John Finnemore's Souvenir Programme
- 2015: John Finnemore's Double Acts: "The Goliath Window"
- 2015: North by Northamptonshire: Full Stop
- 2017–2018: Time Spanner – Pilot and "The Dan in the High Castle"
- 2017: The Now Show: "Now The Twelfth Night Show" (as Simon Dylan-Kane)
- 2018: Angstrom
- 2018: Agendum
- 2019: The Monster Hunters (podcast)
- 2019: Peter Pan (Audible)
- 2020: Down
- 2023: Below
- 2024: Torchwood - Art Decadence
- 2024: Doctor Who: - The New Adventures of Bernice Summerfield
- 2024: Doctor Who - The War Doctor

=== Writer ===
- 2005–2009: That Mitchell and Webb Sound
- 2009–2010: That Mitchell and Webb Look
- 2009: Laurence and Gus: Hearts and Minds
- 2011: Jonah Non Grata
- 2013: Before They Were Famous
- 2017–2018: Time Spanner – Pilot and "The Dan in the High Castle"

== Awards ==
| Year | Work | Award | Category | Result | Ref. |
|---|---|---|---|---|---|
| 2017 | Sir Maxwell House in The Monster Hunters | AudioVerse Awards | Best Actor in a role for a Self-contained Comedic Production | Won | |
