= Shunt (theatre company) =

British theatre company

Shunt is a London-based performance collective founded in 1998. Most of the co-founders met as students at London's Central School of Speech and Drama while pursuing the Advanced Theatre Practice MA in 1997–1998, which specializes in collaborative practice.

In the summer of 1998, Shunt's final term show 'Twist' was taken to Hill Street Theatre for the Edinburgh Festival under the company name Stephanie's Fridge. The members of the company at that time were David Rosenberg, Lizzie Clachan, Louise Mari, Mischa Twitchin, Gisele Edwards, Su Jin Lee, Laura Cockcroft, Catherine Bowman Shaw, Kirsty Yuill, Hannah Ringham, Serena Bobowski, Gemma Brockis, and Heather Uprichard.

Shunt's work is centered on immersive site-specific performance, usually on a grand scale, and has been supported by Britain's Royal National Theatre NESTA (the National Endowment for Science, Technology and the Arts) and Arts Council England.

== Shows and projects ==
=== The Ballad of Bobby Francois ===
"On October 12th, 1972, a Fairchild F-227, chartered by an amateur rugby team, left Uruguay for Santiago in Chile. It never arrived...."

On their return from Edinburgh, Shunt procured the railway arch 12A Gales Gardens in Bethnal Green and the group reformed. Those who remained in the collective paid the rent between them. The group was now David Rosenberg, Lizzie Clachan, Mischa Twitchin, Louise Mari, Hannah Ringham, Laura Cockcroft, Gemma Brockis, Heather Uprichard, Serena Bobowski and they were joined by Andrew Rutland. They began work on their first show The Ballad of Bobby Francois, which was loosely based on the book Alive: The Story of the Andes Survivors by Piers Paul Reid. The show opened in their space in Bethnal Green in the East End in London in May and October 1999. During this time Laura left the group and Layla Rosa joined the performance collective. The cast was joined by the performer Amber Rose Sealey. 'The Ballad of Bobby Francois' was then taken to the Pleasance Dome as part of the Edinburgh Festival in August 2000, where it won a Herald Angel and a Total Theatre Award. The show was revived at The Drome under London Bridge Station in January 2001 as part of the London International Mime Festival.

=== Shunt Cabarets ===
In autumn 1998 Shunt started bi-monthly cabarets at the Bethnal Green Railway Arch 12A on Sunday nights, where the members of the collective would show ideas for company or personal work in front of a live audience, limited to 8 minutes. The Shunt cabarets ran from December 1998 to August 2003, offering a space for new and emerging artists, as well as opportunities for Shunt members to explore new ideas and collaborate with individuals from outside the company. With a focus on experimentation, the cabarets incorporated a multidisciplinary approach, blending theatre, circus, sound, visual art, installation, video, dance, and various other creative forms. The events were always free of charge.

=== The Tennis Show ===
'Lawn tennis and dirty tricks in a derelict loft by the Thames: Shunt looks back to Tennis' golden summer when McEnroe beat Borg in 1982'

In 2000 Shunt made The Tennis Show at The Museum of at the Bargehouse on the South Bank in London. The collective was joined by performers Ryo Yoshida, Nigel Barrett, Simon Kane, Tom Lyall and Amber Rose Sealey.

=== Sightings ===
In 2001 the company also devised and performed Sightings for Croydon Clocktower, where the company imagined the library and surrounding buildings were slowly filling with water. They were joined by Simon Kane and (now aerialist) Gisele Edwards.

=== Dance Bear Dance ===
Shunt's next show Dance Bear Dance was "based on the gunpowder plot and other less successful acts of terrorism" and was performed at Arch 12a in Bethnal Green between May 2002 (with Simon Kane and Amber Rose Sealey) and August 2003 (with Ryo Yoshida).

=== Tropicana ===
In 2003 Shunt moved into the cavernous vaults under London Bridge Station. They devised and performed their show Tropicana from Sept 2004 to July 2005, joined by Silvia Mercuriali, Melanie Wilson, Nigel Barrett, Paul Mari, Helena Hunter and Simon Kane.

=== Amato Saltone ===
In 2005, this was followed by the show Amato Saltone in which the company were joined by Ryo Yoshida, Nigel Barrett, Geneva Foster Gluck, Simon Kane, Tom Lyall, Jason Barnet and Rebecca Kilgariff. Amato Saltone was inspired by the work of Cornell Woolrich (1903–1968), the father of film noir, who, for over 35 years, fed the pulp magazines with countless stories of steamy mystery fiction. Films made of his work include Hitchcock's Rear Window and Truffaut's The Bride Wore Black.

=== The Shunt Lounge ===
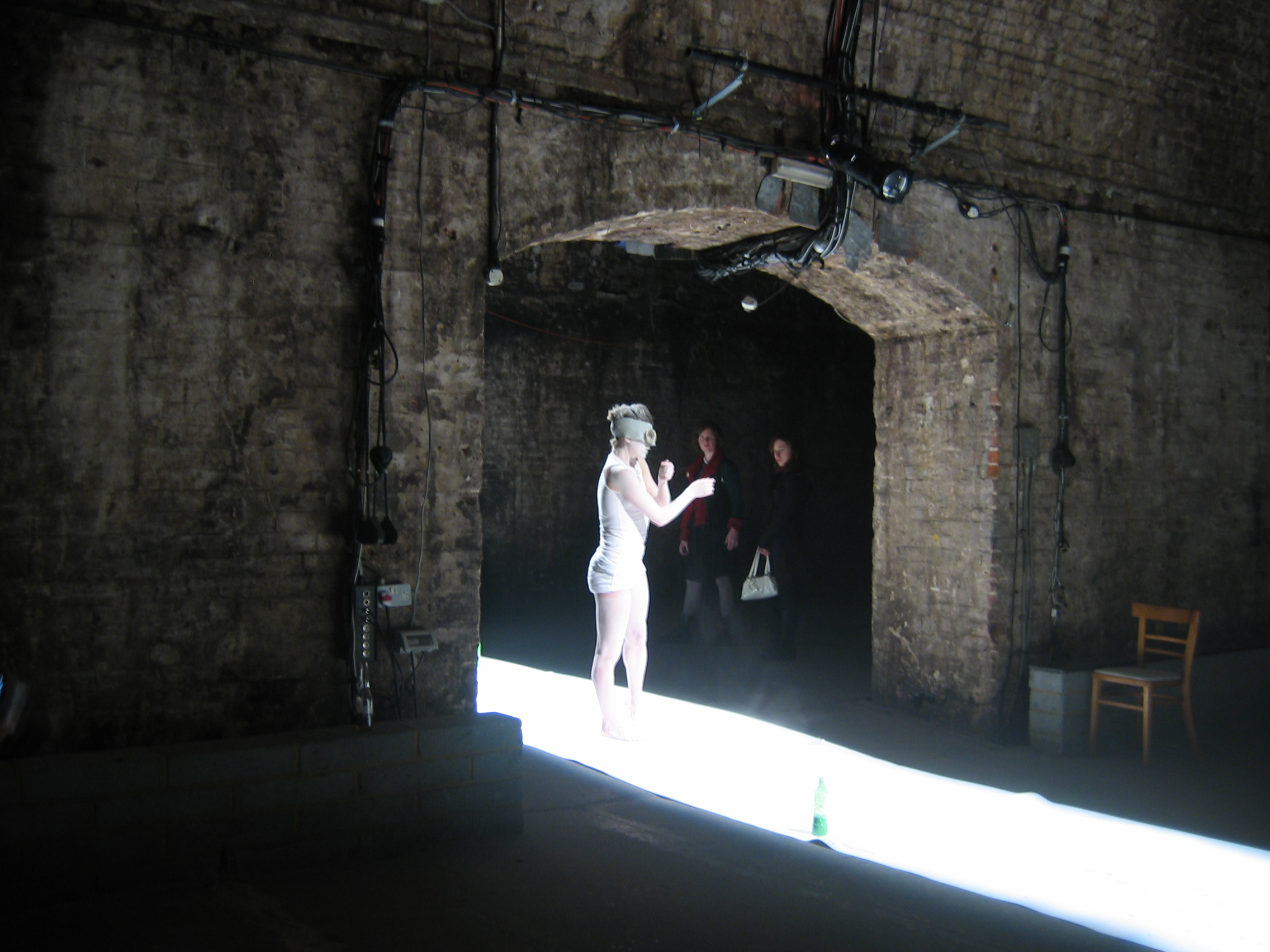
A performance in the Shunt Vaults, 2008

The Shunt Lounge was a project that was held from September 2006 to July 2010. It was a night-time art space, bar and club in a labyrinth of railway arches under London Bridge station in London. For the price of entry, the public could see experimental performance, art, music, sculpture, talks, film, installation, puppetry, plays, exhibitions, and interventions, which changed every week. The Shunt Lounge was open from Wednesdays to Sundays every week. It was technically managed by Andrea Salazar and supported by George Tomlinson. The weekly curation was shared by the company, and supported by the artist and musician Nahum.

The Shunt Lounge was designed as a break that would give the company time to catch their breath but not completely give them a hiatus. "Attendees enter through a service door near the London Bridge Station and go through a series of tunnels and corridors that have pieces of past sets and dressings. Also in the corridor, there can be found films, performance and art that differ from week to week. The crowd has the freedom to explore anywhere in the tunnels. And, hopefully end up at a bar, where there is music, and time to socialize. Twitchin says, "It's not advertised, there are no reviews, you pay to come into the space… and then you have access to everything for free. So, whether it's Station house Opera trying something out, or an opportunity to tattoo bananas, there's no prior judgment. That's important where artists are experimenting with an idea".

"For four years it played host to all manner of weird and wonderful performances: theatre and dance, art installations, film screenings, bands and DJs, all tied together with an undercurrent of wild abandon. Along with providing a unique location in which to showcase performance of all kinds, something in the nature of the venue fed into the hedonistic tendency: it was as if the visiting crowds, descending into a space that existed physically outside the confines of everyday life, felt themselves exempted from its rules."

=== Money ===
In 2009, Shunt rented a former tobacco warehouse in Bermondsey Street, a short walk from the vaults, where they devised and presented Money inspired by Émile Zola's book of the same name. They built a three-story performance space with glass floors and ceilings in which the show took place. Collaborators in Money were Nigel Barrett, Tom Lyall, Simon Kane and Téo Ghil.

When the show closed late in 2010, Shunt continued to run the space and the machine they had created as a bar and club in the same vein as the Shunt Lounge, as this space had now been returned to Network Rail for station improvement works. The company left the Bermondsey Street space in early 2012.

Shunt produced two further shows after leaving the Bermondsey Street space, notably 'The Architects' and 'The Boy Who Climbed Out of His Face', before the collective finally closing in 2014.

=== The Architects ===
In November 2012 they opened with a new show called 'The Architects' at V22, The Biscuit Factory in London-Bermondsey. The company were joined by Nigel Barrett, Helledd Watkins, Matthew Seadon Young, Dave Vigay and aerialists Pablo Meneu and Anna Perez de Manuel.

=== The Boy Who Climbed Out Of His Face ===
This show ran for six weeks in August and September 2014 on "The Jetty," a disused coal jetty over the River Thames, at the Greenwich Peninsula, in London. This would be the final show produced by the collective.

=== Sound and video design ===
Max and Ben Ringham (Conspiracy) have been Shunt's associate artists since 1999 and have worked collaboratively with Shunt on all their shows.

Susanne Dietz has been an associate artist of the company since 1999. She has worked collaboratively with Shunt ever since. As well as creating moving images for all their shows, she has set up and maintained the Shunt Archive.

== Founding members ==
The founding members consist of Serena Bobowski, Hannah Ringham, David Rosenberg, Louise Mari, Lizzie Clachan, Gemma Brockis, Layla Rosa, Andrew Rutland, Heather Uprichard, and Mischa Twitchin. The Shunt artists met on a one-year postgraduate course at Central School of Speech and Drama.

The founding members all make work outside of the collective.

== Process ==
Some believe the idea of Shunt is to "challenge the model of the single author". But this was not the founding idea, which was to "explore the live event". The group agrees on a theme or subject and as individual artists they all contribute proposals for scenes. Though they strive for minimal hierarchy, there are normal roles that the artists fulfill later in the process, such as a dramaturg, lighting designer, sound designer, director, performers etc. This collage is described as "a framing device that holds together disparate found material: the fragments of reality are not fully integrated into the representational scheme of the work of art". Most devised theatre is a ‘montage' or "artwork that brings together assorted material but forges it into a new whole so that all elements are related rationally to the whole despite the heterogeneity of their source". Shunt is a mixture of these ideas because they are intelligent and strategic in terms of intrigue, suspense, and structure.

Like any group, Shunt has disagreements and clashes of artistic vision. Company member Mischa Twitchin says, "There's no need for rose-tinted glasses, sometimes it's fraught and difficult, but there's an ethos". Later he also says: "That spirit of collaboration is something special; it's about the quality of the particular person, not simply their extraordinary skills, but their own ethos. Professionalism is a necessary condition, but it is not sufficient. You can't institutionalize individuals' sense of commitment to their own work within a situation like that".

== Awards ==
- Herald Angel for The Ballad of Bobby Francois
- 2000: Total Theatre Award for The Ballad of Bobby Francois as part of the London International Mime Festival
- 2003: Time Out 'Live' Award for Dance Bear Dance
- Empty Space Award for Dance Bear Dance
- 2003: Peter Brook Empty Space Award
- 2005: Peter Brook Empty Space Award
- The Shunt Lounge was listed as number 25 of the 191 "star bars" in The Independent

== Audiences ==
The audiences have been an integral part of Shunt's process because they provide valuable feedback. The artists know instantly if something works or does not work, and they get the chance to evolve constantly. Shunt's performances often involve audience interaction and immersive experiences. Twitchin describes importance of the audience:

"…one of the main interests of the company is to consider the journey of the audience. The work includes ‘an audience', distinct from a group of people wandering randomly. How they are included is our responsibility; we are making an experience for an audience, in an environment that we are constructing. It's not a Happening, it's a rehearsed show and even if it's not apparent to anybody – even ourselves sometimes! – there is a narrative structure."

== General references ==
- Feature about The Architects
