= Edward Peter Mathers =

British author, editor, newspaper proprietor (1850–1924)

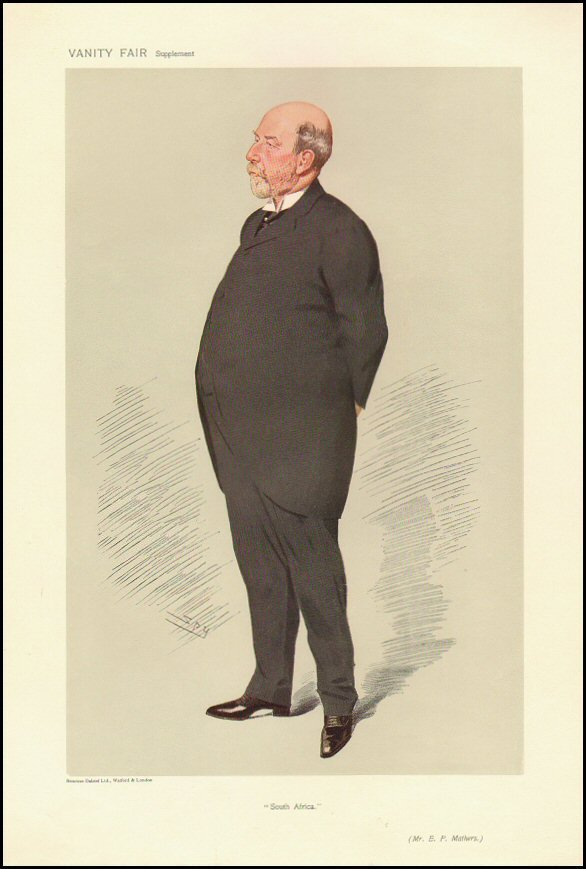
"South Africa": caricature of Edward Peter Mathers by Spy (Vanity Fair, 29 August 1906

Edward Peter Mathers FGS FRGS (19 August 1850, Edinburgh – 13 October 1924, Kensington) was a British author, editor, and newspaper proprietor.

Edward P. Mathers was educated at the Royal High School, Edinburgh, Scotland, and at the Edinburgh Institution for Languages and Mathematics.

He was a journalist in England until 1878, when he emigrated to the British colony of South Africa. There, he worked for various newspapers and became the founder-editor of the Natal Advertiser, a newspaper that was published until 1937. The Natal Advertiser publicized the prospects for wealth from gold mining and fully supported British imperialism.

Mathers also wrote guides and handbooks for British migrants. In the 1880s, he travelled throughout the Transvaal gold fields, wrote about them, and became the first journalist to foretell their great future prospects.

Returning to England in 1888, Mathers founded the weekly newspaper South Africa, and inaugurated annual South African dinners in London. The newspaper South Africa was published from 1889 to 1961.

== Personal life ==
In Durban, South Africa, on 6 August 1885, Mathers married Mary Augusta Powys, a daughter of R. H. Powys who was a cousin of Thomas Powys, 4th Baron Lilford. The marriage produced one son, Edward Powys Mathers, and three daughters.

== Selected publications ==
- Golden South Africa, or The gold fields revisited. 1888.
- Zambesia, England's El Dorado in Africa. 1895.
