= Superthriller =

English electronic music band

Superthriller are an English electronic music band from London formed in 2003. They have released five studio albums, including Superthriller 1, The Blank Album, Superthriller 2, Moods and NEWS.

The three constant members of the band are brothers Max and Ben Ringham and Andrew Rutland who all met while producing music for the Shunt Performance Collective.

== History ==
=== Early releases ===
The band were signed to independent British record label Mint Music. They released three 7" singles in the summer of 2003.

=== Superthriller 1 ===
The debut album was first released in 2004. It was recorded between the summers of 2003 and 2004 primarily in the garden with overdubs being done at Conspiracy Studios, Arch 12A and The Shunt Vaults. The band borrowed many analogue keyboards from vintage collector Marshall Aver. The album was heavily supported by Rough Trade Record shops and made it into their year's top 25 albums. The record was given a more substantial international release the following year when Mint Music secured a wider reaching distribution deal.

=== The Blank Album ===
Whilst completing work on their second album proper, Superthriller 2, the band released a stop gap album of studio out takes, re-edits and bits of sound design informed by their work at Shunt and Frank Zappa's 'We're Only In It For The Money' album. The album was sold as a completely blank cd that had access to a website where the listener would choose 25 tracks out of 30 and program their own running order before downloading and burning the tracks to the disc.

=== Superthriller 2 ===
Released in 2007, Superthriller 2 was not as well received as the previous two records. It was a departure from the sound of Superthriller 1, containing less funk and electronics and more acoustic style songwriting.

=== Moods ===
Released in 2009 Moods was another move on for Superthriller's sound. The album was completely made from samples with no live instrumentation at all. All The Samples being taken from a huge collection of Library music records that Andrew Rutland had purchased.

== Tours and appearances ==
In 2005 Superthriller toured with Beck as his support act playing throughout the U.K. The Show was a multi media performance event. Each song had an accompanying film that was projected onto a giant cube that sat in the centre of the stage. Video artist Suzannah Dietz shot and produced all the film. The Show was directed by David Rosenberg and included Shunt performers Hannah Ringham, Leila Rosa, Gemma Brockis and Serena Bobowski.

The band continued touring until 2007 playing European and British Festivals. From 2007 to 2010 Superthriller changed their live show to a more standard drums/ bass/guitar set up. They played regularly at The Shunt Lounge, Cargo and various other London venues. Hannah Ringham, Leila Rosa, Gemma Brockis and Serena Bobowski regularly contributed backing vocals. John Thompson of The Selecter played bass and Kunja Bihari drums.

These shows at The Shunt Lounge would usually end with singer Ben Ringham inviting the audience to join the band onstage for a chaotic stage invasion finale, which often ended in band and audience members being hospitalised or naked.

== Members ==
- Ben Ringham Lead vocals, backing vocals, keyboards, bass, guitars, drums
- Max Ringham Backing vocals, lead vocals, electronics, keyboards, bass, guitars, drums
- Andrew Rutland Backing vocals, lead vocals, keyboards, guitars, ukulele, drums.

== Live collaborators ==
- Hannah Ringham, Leila Rosa, Gemma Brockis, Serena Bobowski Vocals/performance
- Johnson Performance
- Nahoum Mantra Prince
- Jack Yglesias Percussion
- John Thompson Bass
- Kunja Bihari Drums
- Ross Mcdoull Drums
- Salvador Garza Bass
- Eric Aldrey Engineer

== Discography ==
LP's

- Superthriller 1 (2004)
- The Blank Album (2006)
- Superthriller 2 (2007)
- Moods (2009)
- NEWS (2019)

Singles

- Ahjuswanndance (2003)
- I'm Gonna Ask to Leave at Three So Call Me (2003)
- Smoking Kills (2003)
- Superthriller Motherfucker (2005)
- Pop Goes The Captain (2006)
- Hungry Like DeWolfe (2009)
- The Internet (2014)
