= John Finnemore's Souvenir Programme =

BBC radio programme

- CD cover showing the cast, l-r: Carrie Quinlan, Simon Kane, John Finnemore, Lawry Lewin, Margaret Cabourn-Smith
- Genre: Sketch show
- Running time: 30 minutes
- Country of origin: United Kingdom
- Language: English
- Home station: BBC Radio 4
- Starring: John Finnemore; Carrie Quinlan; Simon Kane; Lawry Lewin; Margaret Cabourn-Smith (Series 2 onwards)
- Written by: John Finnemore
- Produced by: Ed Morrish
- Original release: 2011
- No. of series: 9
- No. of episodes: 56
- Opening theme: "Do It Your Own Way" by The Voodoo Trombone Quartet

John Finnemore's Souvenir Programme is a sketch comedy series broadcast on BBC Radio 4. John Finnemore is the sole writer and performs with Margaret Cabourn-Smith, Simon Kane, Lawry Lewin and Carrie Quinlan. The first series was broadcast on BBC Radio 4 in 2011, and further series have followed annually. A special edition recorded at the Edinburgh Festival Fringe was broadcast in 2012. A 45-minute special containing new material was broadcast on 27th May 2023 and a second was broadcast in 2024.

All nine series have been released on CD.

== Format ==
Each episode of Souvenir Programme is made up of largely unconnected sketches, often either dealing with awkward social situations or comic takes on classic literature, history, fairy tales, or children's stories. Most episodes have a running sketch that recurs a few times throughout, such as an episodic story about the Royal Air Force training cats as navigators during World War II. Comedic songs often appear with lyrics by Finnemore and music by show pianist Susannah Pearse and cellist Sally Stares.

A pilot programme with a different supporting cast, titled John Finnemore, Apparently, was broadcast in 2008, starring Tom Goodman-Hill and Sarah Hadland. Many of the sketches in the pilot were subsequently remade for the series.

=== Recurring sketches ===
- "Since You Ask Me": Finnemore closes most episodes in the role of an eccentric old storyteller (also named John Finnemore) sharing an unusual story full of puns and anachronisms. These are parodies of various genres and tropes, and are largely unconnected save for a few covering Finnemore's adventures with his horse Mr. Floofywhiskers. They occasionally serve to connect several sketches throughout an episode, such as various cons in preparation for a heist.
- The Interview Sketch: Carrie Quinlan plays an unnamed presenter later named Patsy Straightwoman, who interviews various people (usually played by Finnemore) on a variety of subjects and bemoans her purpose of only giving setups to jokes. In series 6, she hosts a program called Behind Closed Doors where she investigates closed-off societies; in series 7, she "runs out of people" to interview and starts interviewing animals.
- Mr Frint: Finnemore plays a pedantic older man who complains about people using language improperly, such as a movers' with a sign saying "no job too big" despite their refusal to help him move a killer whale.
- Animal Designers: The cast play employees of an unnamed organisation that designs and manufactures animals. These sketches usually depict the flawed design processes that led to the creation of odd animals, such as a designer's troubled marriage inspiring him to design the angler fish or an emergency brainstorming session that was held in response to a bar on animals incorporating fire.
- Mulligan's: Finnemore plays the spokesperson for a company called Mulligan's, appearing in advertisements which satirise companies' relationships with their customer bases. Various companies called Mulligan's have featured in unrelated sketches, such as a department store commissioning an overly-sentimental Christmas advert or as a conglomerate responsible for the invention of the unpopular autociter.
- The Archers Accidentally: The cast performs scenes from long-running Radio 4 programme The Archers the way it sounds to people who don't really listen to it, playing generic characters like "one of the men who always sound tired" or "one of the insufferably wry women" caught up in completely inconsequential problems. One sketch in series 7 gives this treatment to Souvenir Programme itself.
- The Voice in John's Head: Simon Kane plays Finnemore's intrusive thoughts that get him into trouble by overthinking things like tipping, ordering coffee, or asking someone on a train to play a game.
- Cast Complaints: Starting in series 5, sketches are occasionally followed or interrupted with the cast "breaking character" to berate Finnemore for their writing. These are, of course, also scripted by Finnemore.
- Stand Up: Finnemore delivers a comic monologue as stand-up comedy about a topic he found funny but couldn't fit into a sketch.
- Roger Wattis: Finnemore plays a man who claims to speak for "Britain's silent majority" and shares with the audience his highly conservative views, which are often based on anecdotes and misconceptions or his aversion to personal responsibility.

=== Series 9 ===
Due to the coronavirus pandemic, the ninth series, broadcast in 2021, was not performed before a live audience or accompanied by live music. The series focused on five generations of a family and their collective lore and traditions (such as the song "Woof, Woof, Woof Goes the Wolfhound") whose developments and origins are explored in and connect several scenes across different episodes. The series' main characters were Russ Golding (Lewin), Deborah Golding née Wilkinson (Cabourn-Smith), Jeremy 'Jerry' Wilkinson (Kane), Vanessa Wilkinson née Noone (Quinlan) and Oswald 'Uncle Newt' Nightingale (Finnemore). The first three episodes acknowledge the pandemic, with Russ, Deborah and Jerry navigating it in present day. The sketch format was modified, with the first five episodes focusing on each of the main characters with scenes from their lives being depicted in reverse order, whilst the sixth depicts their shared experiences told in nonlinear order. Homages are made to the original format, for example most episodes end with 'Uncle Newt', who is analogous with Finnemore's storyteller character, telling a story to, or being told a story by, the main character of that episode (who is a child at the end of the episode because of the reversed chronology), starting them with the catchphrase "Well, since you ask me for...". A detailed explanation of the timeline for this series with information about the various themes has been developed by fans to assist in understanding the format of this season.

=== Specials ===
Following the ninth series, the programme witnessed further format changes. In 2023, a single 45-minute special episode of the Souvenir Programme was broadcast instead of a six-episode series, albeit returning to the regular sketch format of the pre-pandemic series. In 2024, another 45-minute special episode was broadcast set in the fictional village of Allwyn, featuring vignettes from the lives of its eccentric residents and recounting the developments of a local referendum on how to pronounce the village's name (either traditionally as "Alan" or phonetically as "All Win"). The 2025 special saw a return to the regular sketch format, albeit with a "Cast Complaints" sketch where Lawry Lewin questions John about constant format changes and the "Since You Ask Me" sketch taking place in the middle of the episode.

== Awards ==
John Finnemore's Souvenir Programme was voted Best British Radio Sketch Show in the British Comedy Guide Awards 2011. In 2014, it was awarded Silver for Best Comedy at the Radio Academy Awards. It was also shortlisted for Best Radio Comedy in the 2014 Writers' Guild of Great Britain Awards.

== Original broadcasts ==
Series	Start date	End date	Episodes
1	11 September 2011	9 October 2011	4
Special	22 August 2012		1
2	13 September 2012	18 October 2012	6
3	3 September 2013	8 October 2013	6
4	16 October 2014	20 November 2014	6
5	7 January 2016	11 February 2016	6
6	27 December 2016	31 January 2017	6
7	4 January 2018	8 February 2018	6
8	22 May 2019	26 June 2019	6
9	6 May 2021	10 June 2021	6
Special	27 May 2023		1
Special	27 May 2024		1
Special	25 August 2025		1

== Multimedia ==
The show has been released in both Audible audiobook format and on CD, with physical releases published by BBC Physical Audio.

Release	Date
Series 1	23 August 2013
Series 2	5 September 2013
Series 3 & 4	13 November 2014
Series 5	7 April 2016
Series 6	2 March 2017
Series 7	5 April 2018
Series 8	19 September 2019
Series 9	19 August 2021
