= Gus Brown (actor) =

British actor and comedian

Gus Brown (born 1974) is an English actor and comedian.

He is half of the double act Laurence & Gus, alongside fellow comedian and writer Laurence Howarth. Together they have made two series of comedy sketch shows for BBC Radio 4 – Laurence & Gus: Untold Stories (2004); Laurence & Gus: Men in Love (2006) and performed in 3 Edinburgh Fringe shows: A History of the World in 5 1/5 sketches in 2003, Men in Love in 2004 and Next in Line in 2006. In 2009, recording has begun for a series called Laurence & Gus: Hearts & Minds.

In 2006, he teamed up on stage with comedian Justin Edwards, playing Hilary Cox, pianist and sidekick to Edwards' comedy character Jeremy Lion.

He attended Cambridge University, where he met and performed regularly with Mitchell and Webb. He appears in their BBC sketch show That Mitchell and Webb Look.

He appears in one episode of each series of Toast of London.

== Filmography ==
| Year | Film | Role | Notes |
|---|---|---|---|
| 1997 | The Bill | Nicholas Lopez | Episode: "Free to Speak?" |
| 2001 | Happiness | Book Shop Manager | Episode: "Personality Crisis" |
| 2001 | The Mitchell and Webb Situation | Unknown | 5 episodes |
| 2001 | Comedy Lab | Delivery Man | Episode: "Daydream Believers: Brand New Beamer" |
| 2002 | Bust | Pete, Fuzz Two | Short |
| 2002 | My Hero | Location Reporter | Episode: "Shock, Horror!" |
| 2005 | The Robinsons | Graham | Episode: "Episode #1.2" |
| 2005 | Broken News | Ralf Rolfe - ESN Network Reporter | TV mini-series |
| 2006−2008 | That Mitchell and Webb Look | Various | 5 episodes |
| 2007 | The Golf War | Business Man #1 | TV series |
| 2009 | FM | Henry Lawrence | Episode: "Last Night a DJ Saved My Life" |
| 2009 | Bunny and the Bull | Horse Race Commentator | |
| 2009 | A Very British Cult | Graham | Short |
| 2011 | Pixelface | Dr. Nigiri | Episode: "The Problems of Dr. Nigiri" |
| 2011 | The Bleak Old Shop of Stuff | Well To Do Man | Episode: "Christmas Special" |
| 2012 | Kill List: The Musical | The Librarian | Short |
| 2012 | Grey Wolf: Hitler's Escape to Argentina | Voiceover Artist (voice) | Documentary |
| 2013 | All Stars | Teacher #2 | |
| 2013 | Fresh Meat | Celebrant | Episode: "Episode #3.2" |
| 2013−2015 | Toast of London | Solicitor Claude / Bob Fennison / Kikini Bamalam | 3 episodes |
| 2014 | Trying Again | Businessman 1 | Episode: "Episode #1.3" |
| 2014 | Dragon Age: Inquisition | Herald's Rest Patron (voice) | Video game |
| 2014 | Paddington | Second Geographer | |
| 2015 | Cradle to Grave | Bank Manager | Episode: "Episode #1.4" |
| 2015 | The Dark Room | The Teacher | Short |
| 2017 | Zapped | Advocate | TV series |
| 2017 | Paddington 2 | St Paul's Tour Guide | |
| 2017 | Spilt Milk | Charles (voice) | Short |
| 2018 | Johnny English Strikes Again | Headmaster | |
| 2019 | Yesterday | Marcus the Dentist | |
| 2019 | Judy | Porter Reg | |
| 2019−2021 | Worzel Gummidge | Oswald Pollypop | 2 episodes |
| 2020 | Roald & Beatrix: The Tail of the Curious Mouse | Grumpy Godfrey | Television film |
