= Ben Driscoll =

Fictional character from Coronation Street

- Coronation Street character
- Portrayed by: Aaron McCusker; Aodhan Fleming (2025 flashback)
- Duration: 2025–present
- First appearance: Episode 11,705; 27 October 2025
- Introduced by: Kate Brooks
In-universe information
- Occupation: Pub landlord
- Father: Jim McDonald
- Mother: Maggie Driscoll
- Adoptive father: Alan Driscoll
- Half-brothers: Andy McDonald; Steve McDonald; Finlay Driscoll
- Half-sisters: Katie McDonald
- Wife: Melanie Driscoll
- Sons: Ollie Driscoll; Will Driscoll
- Nephews: Ruairi McDonald; Oliver Battersby
- Nieces: Emma Brooker; Amy Barlow

Ben Driscoll is a fictional character from ITV1 soap opera Coronation Street, portrayed by Aaron McCusker. He first appeared on 27 October 2025 alongside his partner Eva Price (Catherine Tyldesley), who was returning to the soap after seven years, and his mother Maggie Driscoll (Pauline McLynn). Ben's arrival followed his son Ollie (Raphael Akuwudike) who arrived three months earlier. Upon his arrival, he and Eva take over running the Rovers Return Inn in Maggie's name and the four of them move in, including Ben's other son Will Driscoll (Luca Hodgson-Wale) and Eva's daughter Susie Price (Aurora Bradshaw).

Ben is characterised to be a former rugby union player, which was a passion he shared with his late father Alan Driscoll (Aidan O'Callaghan). Since first appearing, Ben's storylines have involved his mother constantly interfering in his relationship with Eva, discovering that Eva had an abortion after falling pregnant with his child, Maggie exposing this secret and him punching Adam Barlow (Sam Robertson), Eva's ex-boyfriend who she confides in about the matter and the revelations that Will has been groomed and abused by his athletics coach, Megan Walsh (Beth Nixon). Ben is portrayed as a family man who will do anything for his family.

== Casting and characterisation ==
Aaron McCusker's casting was teased on 4 August 2025, but later confirmed by Digital Spy the following day. His casting was announced the same day as Pauline McLynn who was cast as his on-screen mother, Maggie Driscoll. George Lewis from Digital Spy described the Price/Driscoll family to arrive with a "bang" and a "suitcase full of secrets". McCusker and McLynn had previously worked together in Channel 4 comedy Shameless where they played Jamie Maguire and Libby Croker respectively. Executive producer Kate Brooks spoke about the new castings: "We are beyond thrilled that Eva is returning as the landlady of The Rovers, with her new blended family in tow. The Driscolls do not arrive quietly, so expect big drama, explosive secrets and raucous knees ups galore." She continued: "To have actors of Catherine, Aaron and Pauline's considerable calibre at the beating heart of this family is absolutely wonderful, and we can't wait for you to get to know and fall in love with them as much as we have already done. Strap yourselves in, it's going to be an exciting and eventful ride." Before his first appearance, McCusker suggested his character could go in different directions. He said: "Yes, an ex-wife, and we've talked about my brother as well. It'll be interesting, there's lots of different directions it could go, and I'm very excited to see where it does go." McCusker also hinted at a friendship with established characters Steve McDonald (Simon Gregson) and Tim Metcalfe (Joe Duttine): "He's very funny and he has a gorgeous smile as well. We have a lovely episode. And Steve and Tim - there's been a couple of scenes in the Rovers, I can see Ben, Steve and Tim getting on quite well. I'd love to have a friendship with Roy!"

On 5 April 2026, The Mirror reported that McCusker had previously auditioned for six other roles on Coronation Street in the thirteen years before landing the role of Ben. One of which was the recasting of Todd Grimshaw in 2020, which Gareth Pierce landed. McCusker spoke about these roles: "They weren't all lead roles; the last one I was up for was 14 episodes. I always got very close. I was told that they really liked me, but they wanted to hold out for a bigger part. I used to think 'yeah, whatever.'" He continued: "I know Gareth quite well and I watch him on screen and at work and it's perfect casting. The guy is so talented; there's no one else that could play that part as well as him. And Coronation Street were true to their word, so I'm glad I waited around for this. The Rovers Return is an institution – everybody knows it, even people who don't watch the show - so it doesn't get much bigger than being the pub landlord. Plus, I get to drive home from work and see my kids every day, which for the last six years has never happened."

== Development ==
=== Introduction ===
McCusker made his onscreen debut on 27 October 2025. His first scenes show him and his partner Eva Price (Catherine Tyldesley), who is blindfolded, standing outside the Rovers Return Inn, which Ben has bought for her, which was later revealed to be bought with his mother Maggie Driscoll's (Pauline McLynn) money. To begin with, Ben and his family were already making enemies after his son Ollie Driscoll (Raphael Akuwudike) mentioned a legal case against him after a car accident and a dodgy MOT. Daniel Kilkelly from Digital Spy explained: "With the Rovers Return under new ownership, the Driscolls are about to learn that life on the cobbles is always eventful. And as the pub is at the heart of the community, they may quickly be forced to take sides." Kevin Webster (Michael Le Vell), who owns the garage that performed Ollie's MOT quickly revealed his half-brother (later revealed to be his nephew) Carl Webster (Jonathan Howard) is the expert in dodgy MOTs. Ollie later finds Carl in stitches after Kevin attacked him for his dodgy work and assumes Ben is responsible. He urges Ben to leave it as his girlfriend Dee Dee Bailey (Channique Sterling-Brown) is a lawyer and is sorting it out. Ben initially respects Ollie's wishes, but confronts Carl in the street when he sees him. His message to Carl is: "I'm not here to give you grief – I'm here to give you a warning. I don't like you, okay? You stay away from my family, or it won't be a couple of stitches you need – I'll put you in hospital, understand?"

=== Family and relationships ===
On 31 October 2025, McCusker revealed that his character would have "difficult times ahead". Divya Soni from Digital Spy explained: "Despite a hidden mean streak, which was revealed during an encounter with Carl Webster (Jonathan Howard), Ben has proven himself to be a doting husband, father and son." Upon their arrival, Eva (Catherine Tyldesley) was thrilled to be running the Rovers and holds a celebratory lock-in, but Maggie (Pauline McLynn) the rocked up and insisted that she runs the pub as she funded the sale. Ben decided that Eva's name would be above the door whilst Maggie would be a silent partner. McCusker explained: "He's got every reason to be stuck between his mum and Eva because he loves them both dearly and there's nothing worse than being stuck between that." He continued: "He can see that [Maggie] doesn't treat [Eva] very well but he's scared to step in because she was a single mum and she brought him up. What can he do? Deep down he wishes she wouldn't speak to her like that and wishes she'd go away every now and again."

McCusker explained his relationship with his two sons and stepdaughter is what "keep him sane". He continued: "I think if he didn't have those kids… It should be him keeping his kids on the straight and narrow but I think we might see them keeping him on the straight and narrow." McCusker also revealed that he also has a good offscreen relationship with Raphael Akuwudike, who plays Ollie: "I've got a lovely relationship on screen and off screen with Raph [Akuwudike], who plays my oldest [Ollie]. Me and him have some lovely moments."

=== Backstory and childhood ===
On 30 October 2025, it was revealed that there would be a flashback episode that would show Ben's childhood. Actor Aidan O'Callaghan, who played EastEnders villain Lewis Butler in 2022, was cast as Ben's father Alan Driscoll, who would appear in these flashback scenes. This episode aired on 8 December 2025, which in present day was Maggie's 65th birthday tying in with the 65th anniversary of Coronation Street, which was the following day. In these scenes, it was shown where Ben, who was played by Aodhan Fleming for these scenes, and his brother Finley (Coen Carter) were giving Maggie her birthday presents. She in returns gives them a games console, which causes Alan to question where she got the money for it. Arguments broke out between Ben's parents in the flashback scenes as Maggie tries to convince Alan that he needs to push him to be better at rugby and even tries to hit him. Ben walked in and thought his father was hurting his mother and Maggie managed to turn the situation around and make it as though it was actually Alan who wanted Ben to do better at rugby. Further scenes showed Maggie taunting Alan wanting to take Ben and Finley to the park and past events revealed, such as a possible affair. Following the argument, Maggie pushes Alan down the stairs and dies, which was witnessed by Finley who ran back into his room.

=== Truth about paternity ===
In February 2026, news that Jim McDonald (Charles Lawson) would be killed off was released. His funeral was held on 11 March 2026 with two of his old army friends Declan (Sean Kearns) and Davey (Stephen Don) attending. The former however had a conversation with Maggie (Pauline McLynn) regarding her affair with Jim after finding her familiar. Maggie's affair was previously referred to in the flashback episode to Ben's childhood, which aired in December. On 30 March 2026, it was revealed that Ben would find out the truth about his paternity. Lily Shields-Polyzoides from Digital Spy said: "Coronation Street's Ben Driscoll discovers that his childhood was built on a lie next week, when Maggie drops a bombshell over his biological father. But will she admit that the late Jim McDonald is his dad?" Ben has a dizzy spell and Maggie wishes to call an ambulance, but Ben insists that his mother tells him the truth about his paternity. Feeling backed into a corner, Maggie has no choice but to tell the truth. A source told Digital Spy: "Maggie finally confesses to Ben that Alan isn't his father. She gives in because Ben is clearly still fixated on a recent conversation of theirs, in which Maggie triggered his suspicions about Alan, who died in the early 90s. It's obvious that Ben isn't going to drop it, so Maggie explains to her son that he was the result of an affair – but refuses to be drawn on the identity of the man she met all those years ago…"

After these revelations, Steve McDonald (Simon Gregson) enters the pub and tells Ben and Maggie that his daughter Amy Barlow (Elle Mulvaney) and Ben's son Ollie (Raphael Akuwudike) are alone together at Number 11. This causes Maggie discomfort as Amy and Ollie are cousins. As the week unfolds, Ben heads to the Bistro bar whilst he comprehends the recent news that Alan wasn't his father. The source continued: "Ben is going through so much pain. The look on his face while he's sitting at the Bistro is upsetting enough, but just wait until you see him back at home looking at a photo of him as a child with Alan. Luckily, Eva Price (Catherine Tyldesley) is on hand to promise Ben that Alan loved him as his own." Moments later, Maggie enters the room and Ben tells her he wants nothing to do with her. Maggie then retaliates with an insult. The source continued: "Ben is already in a bad place, and Maggie has the audacity to pour salt into the wound. You'd think that a mother would offer her sympathies in a situation as difficult as this, but that's Maggie for you. Hopefully she doesn't react in the same way when Will (Lucas Hogdson-Wale) finds out that he's the last of the family to be brought in on the secret…"

== Reception ==
After Ben's first appearance when he confronts Carl Webster (Jonathan Howard), Daniel Kilkelly described Ben to be "a force to be reckoned with". On 5 April 2026, Sue Lee and Hannah Britt from The Mirror described Ben to be a "devoted family man."
