= Jan Dunn =

British filmmaker

- Born: 15 May 1963 (age 61); Maidenhead, Berkshire, United Kingdom
- Occupation(s): Film director, screenwriter, producer
- Years active: 1996 – present

Jan Dunn (born 15 May 1963 in Maidenhead, Berkshire, England) is a British film director, screenwriter, and producer. She made her feature length directorial debut in 2005 with Gypo, starring Paul McGann and Pauline McLynn, which won a British Independent Film Award for Best Production. Although Dogme 95 was dissolved in 2005, it was the first film to be made as post-Dogme under the rules.

Her next film Ruby Blue, starring Bob Hoskins and Josiane Balasko, was released in the United Kingdom in 2008. She wrote and directed The Calling (2009), starring Brenda Blethyn, Emily Beecham, Joanna Scanlan, and Rita Tushingham. The film was selected 'Best of the Fest' at the 2009 Edinburgh International Film Festival, and Beecham received the festival's Trailblazer Award for her performance.

== Filmography ==
=== Films ===
| Year | Title | Notes | Ref(s) |
|---|---|---|---|
| 1996 | The Lumber-jills | Short film; director | |
| 1999 | Mary's Date | Short film; producer, director | |
| 2000 | Joan | Short film; producer, director | |
| 2001 | Dora | Short film; producer, director) | |
| 2005 | Gypo | Writer, director, executive producer | |
| 2007 | Ruby Blue | Writer, director | |
| 2009 | The Calling | Writer, director | |

== Awards ==
- British Independent Film Awards 2005 – Gypo Outstanding Achievement in Production
- Political Film Festival Barcelona 2005 – Gypo Jan Dunn special jury mention
- San Francisco International LGBT Film Festival FRAMELINE 2005 – Gypo Best First Feature
- Washington DC International Film Festival 2008 – Ruby Blue Grand Jury Prize Best Film
- London Independent Film Festival 2008 – Ruby Blue Best British Film
- Moondance International Film Festival 2008 – Ruby Blue Spirit of Moondance Award Best Director
- Chicago International LGBT International Film Festival 2008 – Ruby Blue Audience Award Best Feature Film
