= Gypo =

Gypo may refer to:

- Gypo (film), a 2005 British independent film from Jan Dunn
- Gypo Nolan, title character of the novel The Informer and the 1935 film adaptation
- derogatory name for Romani and Irish Travellers derived from gypsy
- nickname of Terry Hurlock (born 1958), English former footballer
