= Maggie Driscoll =

Fictional character from Coronation Street

- Coronation Street character
- Pauline McLynn as Maggie Driscoll
- Portrayed by: Pauline McLynn; Aoife O'Dea (2025 flashback)
- Duration: 2025–present
- First appearance: Episode 11,705; 27 October 2025
- Introduced by: Kate Brooks
In-universe information
- Occupation: Publican
- Husband: Alan Driscoll (backstory)
- Sons: Ben Driscoll; Finlay Driscoll
- Grandsons: Ollie Driscoll; Will Driscoll

Maggie Driscoll is a fictional character from the ITV soap opera Coronation Street, portrayed by Pauline McLynn. She first appeared on 27 October 2025 alongside her son, Ben Driscoll (Aaron McCusker) and his partner Eva Price (Catherine Tyldesley), who was returning to the series after a seven year absence. Their arrivals followed her elder grandson Ollie (Raphael Akuwudike), who first arrived in August 2025. They were followed by her younger grandson Will (Luca Hodgson-Wale) and Eva's daughter Susie (Aurora Bradshaw) to complete a new family unit.

Maggie is characterised as an overbearing mother who regularly clashes with her son and his partner. Upon arrival, she was the new owner of the Rovers Return Inn as Ben bought if for Eva using her money. Maggie's storylines have included moving into the Rovers, interfering in Ben and Eva's relationship, revealing Eva's abortion publicly on Christmas Day 2025, keeping the truth about her late husband, Alan's (Aidan O'Callaghan) death a secret as well as Ben's paternity after her historical extramarital affair with former character Jim McDonald (Charles Lawson), dealing with the fallout after it was revealed that Will was being groomed and sexually abused by his athletics coach, Megan Walsh (Beth Nixon), and telling Ben the truth about both his paternity and Alan's death. Since her introduction, her character has been seen as a villain, which has sparked a lot of mystery and controversy between fans.

== Casting and characterisation ==
McLynn's casting was announced on 5 August 2025 alongside McCusker, who was cast as her on-screen son Ben Driscoll. Upon casting, George Lewis from Digital Spy described Maggie to be "interfering" and that her arrival alongside the rest of the family unit would be with a "bang" and a "suitcase full of secrets". McLynn and McCusker had previously worked together on Channel 4 comedy Shameless where they played Libby Croker and Jamie Maguire respectively. Executive producer Kate Brooks spoke about the new castings: "We are beyond thrilled that Eva is returning as the landlady of The Rovers, with her new blended family in tow. The Driscolls do not arrive quietly, so expect big drama, explosive secrets and raucous knees ups galore." She continued: "To have actors of Catherine, Aaron and Pauline's considerable calibre at the beating heart of this family is absolutely wonderful, and we can't wait for you to get to know and fall in love with them as much as we have already done. Strap yourselves in, it's going to be an exciting and eventful ride." McLynn had previously played Yvonne Cotton in BBC soap opera EastEnders on a recurring basis between 2014 and 2015 and is well-known for playing Mrs Doyle in Channel 4 comedy Father Ted.

== Development ==
=== Introduction ===
McLynn made her first appearance on 27 October 2025. She first appears when she arrives at the Rovers Return Inn where her family have moved into. Her son, Ben Driscoll (Aaron McCusker) bought the pub as a present for his partner, Eva Price (Catherine Tyldesley), however it was later revealed to be with Maggie's money. Maggie therefore insisted that the pub was hers. Upon casting, Maggie's character had been described to be interfering, especially when it came to Ben's relationship with Eva. It was clear from early scenes that Eva and Maggie didn't get on. McCusker, who plays Maggie's on-screen son spoke about their relationship: "He can see that [Maggie] doesn't treat [Eva] very well but he's scared to step in because she was a single mum and she brought him up. What can he do? Deep down he wishes she wouldn't speak to her like that and wishes she'd go away every now and again."

=== Sideboard mystery ===
In October 2025, Maggie went looking for a punch bowl at the Barlow's house for the Rovers' halloween party. When Maggie looked in Ken Barlow's (William Roache) sideboard, she noticed something causing her to look shocked and worried. These scenes caused a mystery for fans. After the flashback episode to Maggie's past was released, McLynn addressed the mystery. Speaking in an interview, Pauline said: "There are other secrets that Maggie's been hiding. There was a very small beat that some eagle-eyed viewers might have spotted, whereby we saw Maggie at No.1. She looked into the cabinet and her reaction suggested that she saw something that made her feel slightly on edge or uncomfortable. We will reveal what that secret is in the upcoming months, but it is just the tip of the iceberg!"

McLynn also addressed the sideboard mystery in an interview with This Morning soap expert, Sharon Marshall. When asked what she saw in the sideboard, McLynn said: "Everyone asks me that! It was one of the first scenes I ever did and even Ken Barlow himself said to me, 'What is in the sideboard?' I was looking for a punchbowl, as you do, in somebody else's house, fresh onto the Street, and I had to say to him, 'I don't know!' Because there was nothing in there when I looked." She added: "We do find out what, and it's a rather big plot thing that no one sees coming... I didn't! But I wasn't told for about four or five weeks. We haven't filmed what it is yet. But even Ken Barlow himself didn't know."

=== Killer secret ===
On 30 October 2025, it was announced that there would be a flashback episode which showed a younger version of Maggie and her late husband Alan. For the role of Alan, former EastEnders actor Aidan O'Callaghan was cast. This episode aired on 8 December 2025, which was Maggie's present day 65th birthday, which was made to tie in with the 65th anniversary of Coronation Street. For the flashback scenes, Maggie was played by Aoife O'Dea. In these scenes, it was shown where Ben, who was played by Aodhan Fleming, and Maggie's younger son, Finley (Coen Carter) were giving her birthday presents. Maggie in return gives them a games console, which causes Alan to question where she got the money for it. Arguments broke out between Alan and Maggie, who tries to convince him that he needs to push him to be better at rugby and even tries to hit him. Ben walked in and thought his father was hurting his mother and Maggie managed to turn the situation around and make it as though it was actually Alan who wanted Ben to do better at rugby. Further scenes showed Maggie taunting Alan wanting to take Ben and Finley to the park and past events revealed, such as a possible affair. Following the argument, Maggie pushes Alan down the stairs and he dies, witnessed by Finley who ran back into his room.

Following the episode's release, it was revealed that Maggie would be a new villain for Coronation Street. Speaking about this, McLynn wasn't bothered about being the new villain. She told The Mirror: "Even if people think there’s terrible villainy afoot, we all love a villain, don’t we?" She continued: "As long as the audience is entertained by what she’s up to, I don’t mind whether they like her or not, as long as they want to know what happens next." McLynn also shared that she had spoken to Kate Ford, who plays Tracy Barlow about being a villain. She explained: "I said [to Ford] 'there's a flashback for me and there's a bit of pushing at the top of the stairs and somebody falls down them and dies.' She said 'yeah, well, I’ve killed three times and you know what? You just have to get on with things.' So that’s where I am!" McLynn continued by explaining that she hoped people would understand Maggie's character, but didn't expect her to face any series consequences: "Hopefully some people will like Maggie. The flashback is just sad really. It was an accident, not murder. That’s what I think anyway." She continued: "It is very much open to interpretation, although I don’t think Coronation Street intends a full murder trial or anything like that. Though people change their minds all the time, so who knows!"

=== Historical affair with Jim McDonald ===
In February 2026, news that Jim McDonald (Charles Lawson) would be killed off was released. His funeral was held on 11 March 2026 with two of his old army friends Declan (Sean Kearns) and Davey (Stephen Don) attending. Maggie's affair was previously referred to in the flashback episode to Ben's childhood, which aired in December. On 30 March 2026, it was revealed that Ben would find out the truth about his paternity. Lily Shields-Polyzoides from Digital Spy said: "Coronation Street's Ben Driscoll discovers that his childhood was built on a lie next week, when Maggie drops a bombshell over his biological father. But will she admit that the late Jim McDonald is his dad?" Ben has a dizzy spell and Maggie wishes to call an ambulance, but Ben insists that his mother tells him the truth about his paternity. Feeling backed into a corner, Maggie has no choice but to tell the truth. A source told Digital Spy: "Maggie finally confesses to Ben that Alan isn't his father. She gives in because Ben is clearly still fixated on a recent conversation of theirs, in which Maggie triggered his suspicions about Alan, who died in the early 90s. It's obvious that Ben isn't going to drop it, so Maggie explains to her son that he was the result of an affair – but refuses to be drawn on the identity of the man she met all those years ago…"

After these revelations, Steve McDonald (Simon Gregson) enters the pub and tells Ben and Maggie that his daughter Amy Barlow (Elle Mulvaney) and Ben's son Ollie (Raphael Akuwudike) are alone together at Number 11. This causes Maggie discomfort as Amy and Ollie are cousins. As the week unfolds, Ben heads to the Bistro bar whilst he comprehends the recent news that Alan wasn't his father. The source continued: "Ben is going through so much pain. The look on his face while he's sitting at the Bistro is upsetting enough, but just wait until you see him back at home looking at a photo of him as a child with Alan. Luckily, Eva Price (Catherine Tyldesley) is on hand to promise Ben that Alan loved him as his own." Moments later, Maggie enters the room and Ben tells her he wants nothing to do with her. Maggie then retaliates with an insult. The source continued: "Ben is already in a bad place, and Maggie has the audacity to pour salt into the wound. You'd think that a mother would offer her sympathies in a situation as difficult as this, but that's Maggie for you. Hopefully she doesn't react in the same way when Will (Lucas Hogdson-Wale) finds out that he's the last of the family to be brought in on the secret…"

=== Telling Ben the truth about Alan's death ===
On 6 May 2026, it was revealed that Maggie would finally tell Ben the truth about how Alan died. Cindy Humphrey had recently joined the cast as Ben's ex-wife Melanie Driscoll, who arrives after hearing the news that Megan Walsh (Beth Nixon) had been grooming and sexually abusing their son, Will Driscoll (Luca Hodgson-Wale). Wanting to take him to live in Scotland with her, Maggie protested, which was when she revealed that Finley, whom she remained in contact with, told her what Maggie did to his father, Alan as a way to blackmail her. Megan overheard a conversation between the two, recorded it and used it against Maggie when on the phone to her from a prison cell to also blackmail her. An insider told Digital Spy: "This secret could blow apart Maggie and Ben's relationship forever." They continued: "He's only just discovered that Jim McDonald was his biological father, but now Maggie might have to tell him that she pushed Alan down the stairs, causing his death. It's not just the crime that's unforgivable, but the lying too. Maggie would do anything not to come clean." Kate Woodward and Daniel Kilkelly from Digital Spy said: "There's no doubt that Ben's scheming mother has been good at covering her tracks so far, but Melanie holds a trump card. Maggie's shaken when Ben tells her that Melanie has called, and she panics about what has been said." When Maggie does tell Ben the truth, Ben banishes her from the family and the Rovers Return Inn and she ends up staying with Ken Barlow (William Roache).

== Reception ==
After Maggie looking into Ken Barlow's (William Roache) sideboard and the flashback episodes, much speculation was sparked between fans after the possibility of Maggie having an affair was revealed during her argument with her husband Alan (Aidan O'Callaghan). Some fans suggested that she could have had an affair with a former character, such as Peter Barlow (Chris Gascoyne) or Mike Baldwin (Johnny Briggs).
