= On the Move (TV series) =

British television series

On The Move is a British television series made by the BBC and first broadcast in 1975 and 1976, on Sunday teatimes, in 50 ten-minute episodes. On the surface a lightweight soap opera, it was in fact an educational programme aimed at adults with literacy problems, and linked to a national campaign at the time. Up to 17 million people watched the series, and it was credited with removing some of the stigma attached to illiteracy. It was produced by David Hargreaves and directed by Barbara Derkow.

== Content ==
The running narrative features the characters of Alf (Bob Hoskins), a removal man who has problems reading and writing, and his colleague and friend Bert (Donald Gee). This narrative is interspersed with sketches and exercises featuring actors including Nigel Stock, Patricia Hayes, Martin Shaw, Polly James, Gay Hamilton, Mel Martin, Rosemary Leach, and Norman Rossington.

== Production ==
The series was partially inspired by the Italian series, Non è mai troppo tardi ("It's never too late"), broadcast 1960–1968, and similarly devised to address problems of illiteracy.

The show was written by Barry Took. The theme tune, "On the Move", was composed by Alan Hawkshaw and R. Tempest, and sung by The Dooleys.

== Successors ==
The series had two BBC follow-ups: Your Move (1976–1977), which was again written by Took, and Write Away (1979–1980), which was presented by Took.

== Cultural references ==
- In The Dead of Jericho (1981), the fifth novel in the Inspector Morse series by Colin Dexter, Morse discovers some On the Move publicity leaflets in the house of George Jackson, a murder victim. The find (and the absence of books in the house) persuades him that Jackson was probably functionally illiterate, and therefore not responsible for a blackmail note sent earlier in the story.
