= Janette Mason =

British jazz pianist, arranger, composer and record producer

Janette Mason is a British jazz pianist, arranger, composer and record producer. Three of her albums have received four-starred reviews in The Guardian and her second album, Alien Left Hand, was nominated for the Parliamentary Jazz Awards in 2010. The film scores she has written include the British dramas Ruby Blue (2008) and The Calling (2009).

Mason toured In the 1990s with such artists as Oasis, K.d. lang and Seal. She has also worked as musical director for Antoine de Caunes and Jonathan Ross and has toured in the United States, Europe, Israel, Japan and Thailand. She has also played at the Royal Albert Hall, Carnegie Hall, and at the Atlanta Jazz Festival, Provincetown Jazz Festival, and the Rochester International Jazz Festival. She has performed the music of Robert Wyatt and also toured and collaborated with him.

== Early life and education ==
Mason was born in Bushey, Hertfordshire and grew up in Wembley in a musical household: her mother, who performed in the Gracie Cole Big Band, played jazz organ and vibraphone. She studied at the Guildhall School of Music and Drama and has a degree in musical composition for film and television.

== Discography ==
=== Albums ===
Title	Release date	Label	Notes
Din and Tonic	6 May 2005	Fireball Records	Features Mornington Lockett (saxophones) and Lea DeLaria (vocals)
Alien Left Hand	26 January 2009	Fireball Records (1481)	Features Julian Siegel (saxophone), Tom Arthurs (trumpet) and Lea DeLaria (vocals)
D'Ranged	4 August 2014	Fireball Records (FMJP 10004)	Features vocalists David McAlmont, Claire Martin, Tatiana LadyMay Mayfield, Vula Malinga and Gwyneth Herbert
Red Alert	30 September 2017	Dot Time Records (DT9072)	With Jack Pollitt on drums and Tom Mason on bass

=== Singles ===
Title	Music/lyrics	Label	Release date	Notes
"Starman"	David Bowie		8 January 2021	Features David McAlmont
"Jean Genie"	David Bowie		19 February 2021	Features David McAlmont and Sam Obernik
"Wild is the Wind"	Ned Washington/ Dimitri Tiomkin		2 April 2021	Features Sam Obernik
"Fame"	David Bowie/ Carlos Alomar /John Lennon		14 May 2021	Features David McAlmont

== Publications ==
- (with Steve Lodder) (2008) Totally Interactive Keyboard Bible, Jawbone. ISBN 978-1906002176.
