= Bev Slater =

Fictional character from EastEnders

- EastEnders character
- Portrayed by: Ashley McGuire
- Duration: 2018–19
- First appearance: Episode 5779; 18 September 2018
- Last appearance: Episode 5849; 11 January 2019
- Introduced by: John Yorke
In-universe information
- Family: Slater
- Daughters: Hayley Slater
- Granddaughters: Cherry Slater

Bev Slater is a fictional character from the British soap opera EastEnders, played by Ashley McGuire. The character and casting was announced in September 2018 and she debuted 18 September of the same year. McGuire had previously appeared on the soap as a guest character in 2004. Bev was introduced as the estranged mother of Hayley Slater (Katie Jarvis) and her initial stint sees Bev try to reconnect with Hayley, who is pregnant. Hayley gives Bev a chance but ends up fighting with her when she suggests that Hayley scam the baby's father out of money. In October 2018, it was reported that McGuire would return for another stint and Bev's return aired on 6 November 2018, after Hayley gives birth. Bev initially supports Hayley but then tries to manipulate her into selling her daughter, Cherry Slater. Bev later returns for additional episodes over the next two months, and her last appearance aired on 11 January 2019. Throughout her stints, she also gets into fights with Kat Slater (Jessie Wallace) and Jean Slater (Gillian Wright). Critics have characterised Bev as vile, scheming, toxic and evil, and her behaviour towards her daughter and granddaughter has been criticised by viewers.

== Casting and development ==
Ashley McGuire's casting as Bev, the estranged mother of pregnant Hayley Slater (Katie Jarvis), was reported on 11 September 2018 in advanced spoilers released for the soap. McGuire had previously appeared on EastEnders as guest character Carol in 2004. It was reported that Bev and Hayley's reunion would be "tense" and that Hayley would not be happy to see her mother arriving in Albert Square, the soap's fictional setting, and teased that Bev's arrival could ruin Hayley's new-found more positive attitude towards her pregnancy. It was never confirmed whether Bev was biologically related to the other members of the Slater family. Bev's debut aired on 18 September 2018, and she initially appeared in three episodes until her initial departure on 21 September 2018.

In the storyline, Hayley is unhappy when she sees her mother and is angry at Jean Slater (Gillian Wright) when it emerges that she called her. Hayley's relative Kat Slater (Jessie Wallace) is also unhappy to see Bev. Hayley decides to hear her mother out and goes to E20, the local nightclub, to catch up with Bev, but she then realises that her mother has not changed and that Bev has only come to see her in encourage Hayley to fleece her unborn baby's father for money and to con married men for money, and is furious when Bev calls the baby a "walking cash machine". After Bev says that she should have aborted Hayley, a "devastated and angry" Hayley almost hits her mother with a bottle but calls her "evil" instead. After the heated argument, a "Terrified" Hayley ends up clutching in pain and begs Bev for help as she is bleeding and is worried that she is going to lose her baby, but Bev ignores her daughter and goes inside a cab, telling her that she used to wish that Hayley had been born dead.

In October 2018, it was announced that McGuire would be returning to EastEnders as Bev the following month. Her new stint began on 6 November 2018. Bev returns after Hayley gives birth to Cherry Slater and abandons her on Arshad (Madhav Sharma) and aunt Mariam Ahmed's (Indira Joshi) doorstep; Hayley is then taken in by Bev, who tells her that she has done the right thing. Bev also tells Hayley that she would have been a bad mother and that she should have aborted the baby. When Kat goes looking for Hayley, Bev pretends that she has not seen her. Hayley later changes her mind and gets Cherry back, and Bev supports Hayley and says that Cherry can help fix her past. Bev also "shocks everyone" by taking Cherry and Hayley decides to go back with Bev rather the other Slaters, and Bev "stands firm" despite Kat's pleas for Hayley to come with them.

However, Bev soon begins criticising all of Hayley's actions towards Cherry and tries to lower her confidence in an attempt to convince her she is a bad mother and turn her away from motherhood. Despite Hayley trying her best to be a good mother, Bev interferes. It is soon revealed that this is part of Bev's scheme to manipulate Hayley and get her to sell Cherry. Hayley becomes suspicious of Bev when she finds her making secret phones calls and taking a picture of Cherry. When Hayley discovers what Bev is up to, she is horrified and clashes with her mother but Bev does not apologise and attempts to make her daughter believe that she just wants what is best for Cherry. Bev also lies to Hayley about the money, saying that a couple made an offer for a few hundred pounds when they actually offered £100,000. Hayley ends up calling Jean for support after this, and Bev subsequently goes to Jean and warns her to stay out of the situation. Kat lashes out at Bev when Hayley tells her that Bev wants her to give up Cherry. In response to this, Bev offers Kat part of the money if she gets Hayley to agree to the plan. Weeks later, Hayley calls Bev as the pressure on her begins to increase due to the return of Kat's husband, Alfie Moon (Shane Richie), who is Cherry's biological father, which Hayley is hiding from Kat.

Bev returns again in the episode originally airing on 20 December 2018. Upon her return, Bev also joins the choir Jean is in. Earlier that month, it had been reported that Bev would go "head to head" with Kat in the 2018 Christmas Day episode. This occurred prior to Kat finding out that Alfie is Cherry's biological father in the same episode. In the episode, Hayley is worried that her secret will be exposed and so asks Bev to take her and Cherry in, but things end up getting "heated" between Bev and Hayley and so Kat steps in and stands up for Hayley. Bev then makes another appearance on 10 January 2019, when she drops in to see Hayley. Bev's final appearance aired on 11 January of that year.

== Storylines ==
Bev turns up to see her pregnant daughter, Hayley Slater (Katie Jarvis), who is not happy to see her. Jean Slater (Gillian Wright) convinces Hayley to give her mother a chance and Hayley catches up with her mother, who says she wants to make up for her mistakes. However, Hayley is disgusted when she discovers that Bev is blackmailing married men for money and when Bev suggests that she blackmails her unborn baby's father for money. The pair end up arguing and Bev tells her that she should have aborted her baby like she tried to with her. Hayley almost hits Bev with a bottle but the pair end up insulting each other. Bev leaves, and Hayley ends up begging for help as she begins bleeding, but Bev gets in a taxi and leaves Hayley in crisis. Weeks later, Bev comes to the hospital after Hayley gives birth to a girl and takes the baby, which Hayley allows. Bev suggests calling the baby Rose and initially helps Hayley with the baby, but she soon begins manipulating her into thinking she is doing a bad job. She tries to convince Hayley to sell her baby to another family and talks to someone on the phone to get the baby adopted for £100,000. When Hayley's relative Kat Slater (Jessie Wallace) finds out, she confronts Bev; Bev offers to give Kat part of the money if she gets Hayley to agree, but Kat tells Hayley instead and the pair leave with the baby, who is named Cherry.

Bev returns days before Christmas at the Slater house as she has been evicted from her flat and needs a place to stay. Kat's husband, Alfie Moon (Shane Richie), who is secretly the father of Cherry, does not want Bev to stay with them and Ian Beale (Adam Woodyatt) to allow Bev to stay at his house. Jean is not happy about this. On Christmas Day, Hayley asks Bev to move in with her to raise Cherry, but Bev insists that Hayley gets Cherry's father involved. Hayley cries after Bev tells her how Hayley's father was abusive to them after Hayley was born and this is witnessed by Kat, who tells Bev to leave. Bev insults the Slater family and storms out. The following month, Bev returns to visit Hayley and Cherry, but Hayley orders her to leave. Bev apologises for her previous behaviour and says that she has been staying with a friend. Bev offers for Hayley and Cherry to move into a new flat and arranges a flat viewing. When Hayley falls asleep, Bev tries to take Cherry for a walk, but Jean finds that Bev had sleeping pills in her bag and accuses her of drugging Hayley and trying to sell Cherry again. Bev tries to show that she has good intentions, claiming that she slipped a pill in Hayley's drink to help her sleep and not sell Cherry, but Jean does not believe her, so Bev points out the mistakes Jean made as a mother. Jean is scared and Hayley angrily tells Bev to leave. Once gone, Bev cancels the house viewing, showing that she was being genuine.

== Reception ==
Duncan Lindsay from Metro noted that Bev's arrival was not welcomed by her family and called the episode where she leaves Hayley to bleed the "One to watch" out of the EastEnders' episodes airing that week. Lindsay later called Bev "despicable" and noted that she had "spilled bile" by telling Hayley that she wished she had aborted her. He later added how "toxic" Bev made a "scathing and devastating rant" to Hayley. Lindsay also opined that Bev was "acting the doting mother" after Hayley gave birth and questioned whether she had an ulterior motive for her kindness, adding, "Judging from her past appearance, this may be an easy one to answer..." Of Bev's plot to sell Cherry, Lindsay wrote, "For those who recall the absolute poison that Bev spouted in her first episodes of EastEnders, it will not be a huge surprise that she has another wicked act in store as she seems to be plotting to sell Hayley Slater’s baby". Lindsay's colleague, Katie Baillie, questioned whether Kat would betray Hayley and go ahead with Bev's plot.

Following Bev's debut, Kyle O'Sullivan from the Daily Mirror called Bev "disgusting" and "heartless" for leaving Hayley to bleed, adding that "Bev's cruel words in the emergency situation made her actions seem even worse". He later called Bev "Nasty", "selfish" and "conniving" for her "shocking" and "sick scheme" towards Hayley and Cherry. O'Sullivan's colleague, Jenny Desborough, called Bev evil and noted how viewers were shocked at Bev's plan to sell Cherry. Desborough also called Bev's plan to sell Cherry "dastardly". Radio Times's Johnathon Hughes also believed that Bev was toxic. A writer from TV Times characterised Bev as controlling and "horrific".

Megan Davies from Digital Spy noted how Bev and Hayley had a "blazing row" when Bev's "deception" was revealed and also wrote "it's safe to say viewers aren't keen on Bev right now", noting viewers' online opinions towards the character. Daniel Kilkelly from the same website called Bev "troublesome" and also questioned whether she had an ulterior motive for her kindness towards Hayley after she gave birth. He also called Bev's scheme to sell Cherry "surprising". Kilkelly's colleague, Sophie Dainty, opined that Bev was able to "worm" back into Hayley's life and opined that her scheme to sell Cherry was shocking and really dark, in addition to being an "devastating ordeal" to Hayley. Of Bev's December return, Kilkelly wrote "Just when things couldn't get much worse for Hayley..." He also called her "troublesome" and noted that she made "her presence felt". He also noted that Bev was a schemer. Sam Warner from Digital Spy reported how viewers expressed their anger on social media over Bev's "graphic" language towards her granddaughter and Hayley's pregnancy, including how she called Cherry "it" and told Hayley that she should have "flushed her out".

A writer from Inside Soap believed that "conniving, cheating cow!" was the "perfect description" for Bev; they also wrote, "Having met Bev, we think it's perfectly reasonable for Hayley to blame her for every one of her troubles". A writer from the same magazine wrote that Bev "certainly made quite an impression" in her first stint and questioned whether she would add to Hayley's woes upon her return. Gary Gillatt from Inside Soap called Bev a "a cruel, loathsome, remorseless beeyatch" and wanted to see more of her. Gillatt's colleague, Tom Spilsbury, called Bev's initial reunion with her daughter in her first scenes a "spiky encounter". He also called Bev "callous". Charlotte Tutton from OK! noted that Bev caused trouble for the slaters and questioned whether Hayley could trust her. Tutton's colleague, Beth Allcock, reported how viewers recognised McGuire from her previous role when she first appeared as Bev.
