= The Calling (2009 film) =

- Theatrical poster
- Directed by: Jan Dunn
- Written by: Alex Rose
- Produced by: Dorothy Berwin; Sarah Curtis
- Starring: Brenda Blethyn; Emily Beecham; Joanna Scanlan; Rita Tushingham
- Cinematography: Ole Bratt Birkeland
- Edited by: Emma Collins
- Music by: Janette Mason
- Release dates: 21 June 2009 (Edinburgh Film Festival); 23 April 2010 (United Kingdom)
- Running time: 105 minutes
- Language: English

The Calling is a 2009 British drama film directed by Jan Dunn. Dunn's third feature film, it tells the story of Joanna, played by Emily Beecham, who after graduating from university, goes against her family and friends when she decides to join the closed order of Benedictine nuns. For her debut leading performance in the film, Beecham was awarded a New Talent Trailblazer Award presented by Sean Connery during the film's debut, where it was also selected as 'Best of the Fest' at the 2009 Edinburgh International Film Festival.

== Cast ==
- Brenda Blethyn as Sister Ignatious
- Emily Beecham as Joanna
- Joanna Scanlan as Sister Kevin
- Pauline McLynn as Sister Hilda
- Rita Tushingham as Sister Gertrude
- Susannah Harker as Sister Ambrose
- Susannah York as The Prioress
- Annette Kneath as Clive's Mum

== Filming locations ==
The Calling was fully shot in Kent at several locations across the county. Salmestone Grange in Margate was used as the location for the Benedictine Convent, the University of Kent at Canterbury and the Gulbenkian Cafe provided great locations for establishing Jo at her university, and St Lawrence College in Ramsgate was used for the nuns' rooms and hospice scenes. Villa Cap Martin in Broadstairs was used as Jo's family home. Other Kent filming locations include Barnsole Vineyard, Joss Bay in Broadstairs, Ramsgate High Street and Wingham Wildlife Park which doubled as Africa at the end of the film.

== Reception ==
Empire magazine wrote that "despite the rather awkward shift from gentle humour into full-on soap opera, this is played with admirable ensemble nous and directed with a sincere grasp of the impact human foible can have on even the most fervent religious belief. Brenda Blethyn particularly stands out, with her common sense attitude to temporal and spiritual matters confirming the validity and relevance of vocations to modern living."

The Guardian writer Catherine Shoard rated the film two stars out of five and wrote: "Half Doubt, half Hollyoaks, Jan Dunn's latest attempt to put Thanet on the cinematic map unfolds at the world's busiest, bitchiest convent: St Bertha's of Ramsgate. Barely a scene goes by without someone self-flagellating, getting pregnant, topping themselves or having a whopping skeleton pop out of the cupboard [...] Only she [Blethyn], really, manages to ride the rollercoaster jumps in plot and tone that sadly mean The Calling may fail to speak to many."
