= D'Ranged =

Studio album by Janette Mason
- Released: 4 August 2014 (UK)
- Studio: Assault and Battery 2 and The Blue Studio London
- Genre: Jazz, funk, soul
- Label: Fireball Records (FMJP 10004)
- Producer: Janette Mason and Andrew Tulloch

Janette Mason chronology
Alien Left Hand (2009)	D'Ranged (2014)	Red Alert (2017)

D'Ranged is the third album by British jazz pianist Janette Mason. It was released in 2014 by Fireball Records and features vocalists Gwyneth Herbert, David McAlmont, Vula Malinga, Claire Martin and Tatiana LadyMay Mayfield. It has been described as "a series of arrangements of an eclectic mix of classic soul songs, 70’s disco and 80’s pop tunes... all given a distinctive twist by arranger and pianist Mason, and performed by a stellar cast of collaborators from her wide ranging career." Jazz critic John Fordham gave it four stars in a review for The Guardian.

== Reception ==
Professional ratings
Review scores
Source	Rating
The Guardian	4/5 stars

Mike Collins, reviewing the album for London Jazz News, said that "After 2010’s Parliamentary Jazz Award nominated Alien Left Hand, a more overtly jazz orientated album, D’ranged marks something of a departure for the leader’s own releases. There are varied moods within the collection with the spirit of the originals sustained whilst being reshaped in Mason’s skilful hands."

== Track listing ==
1. "I Wish" (Stevie Wonder) – vocals: Tatiana LadyMay Mayfield – 3:52
2. "Got to Be Real" (Cheryl Lynn, David Paich and David Foster) – vocals: Vula Malinga – 5:09
3. "Lady Grinning Soul" (David Bowie) – vocals: David McAlmont – 3:40
4. "How Deep Is Your Love" (The Bee Gees) – vocals: Claire Martin – 4:49
5. "Ashes to Ashes (This Is Not America)" (Bowie) – instrumental – 4:59
6. "This House" (Alison Moyet) – vocals: Gwyneth Herbert – 7:46
7. "Blue Moon" (Rodgers and Hart) – vocals: Claire Martin – 4:50
8. "You Do Something to Me" (Paul Weller) – vocals: Gwyneth Herbert – 3:06
9. "I Say a Little Prayer" (Burt Bacharach) – vocals: Vula Malinga – 6:26
