= Provincetown Jazz Festival =

The Annual Provincetown Jazz Festival was founded in 2005 and is held in Provincetown, which is the oldest continuous arts colony in the United States, and a portion of the proceeds are donated to JAZZ in the Schools program on Cape Cod.

Jazz musicians who have performed include Evan Christopher (clarinet), Scott Robert Avidon (sax), Billy Stritch (piano & vocals), Molly Ringwald (vocals), Kate McGarry (vocals), Howard Alden (guitar), Joe Muranyi (clarinet), Greg Abate (sax), Afro Bob Alliance, Shawnn Monteiro (vocals), Suede (vocals & trumpet), Rebecca Parris (vocals), Nicki Parrott (bass & vocals), Stephanie Jordan (vocals), Lea DeLaria (vocals), Zoe Lewis (vocals), Lou Colombo (trumpet), Jim Robitaille (guitar), Janette Mason (piano), Mary Ann McSweeney (bass), Bruce Abbott (sax), Matt Richard (piano), John Harrison III (piano), Dave Zinno (bass), Bart Weisman (drums),
