= Emily Beecham =

English actress (born 1984)

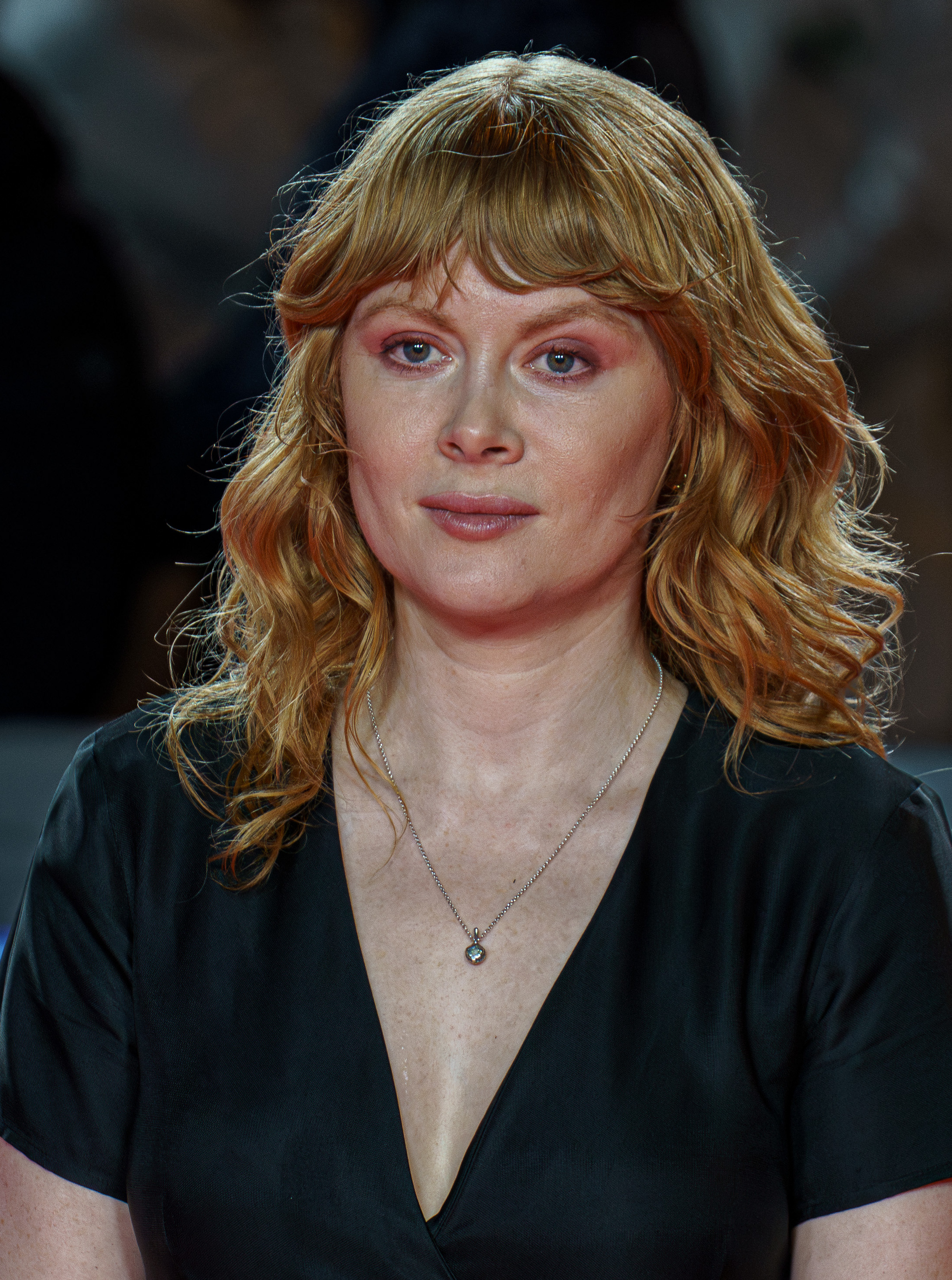
- Beecham in 2025
- Born: 12 May 1984 (age 42); Wythenshawe, Greater Manchester, England
- Citizenship: United Kingdom; United States
- Education: London Academy of Music and Dramatic Art
- Occupation: Actress
- Years active: 2006–present

Emily Beecham (born 12 May 1984) is an English and American actress. She is best known for her roles in the Netflix series 1899 in which she played the lead character, the AMC series Into the Badlands, the Coen Brothers film Hail, Caesar!, and the title role in the 2017 film Daphne. She starred in the 2019 film Little Joe, for which she received the Best Actress award at the Cannes Film Festival.

== Early life and education ==
Beecham was born in Wythenshawe, the daughter of an English father and American mother from Arizona. Her father is an airline pilot. She has dual British and American citizenship. In 2003, at the age of 18, she enrolled at the London Academy of Music and Dramatic Art (LAMDA) and graduated with a BA in 2006.

== Career ==
In her final year at LAMDA, Beecham started accepting professional acting opportunities, with her first appearances occurring in the thriller Bon Voyage and the supernatural TV series Afterlife. Her first feature film, Bon Voyage, premiered that October and received positive notices following its showing on ITV. It won the Golden Nymph award at the June 2007 Monte Carlo Television Festival.

In mid-2007, Beecham was chosen by the director Jan Dunn for the leading role in her independent film The Calling, for which she won the Best Actress Award at the London Independent Film Festival, and the Edinburgh International Film Festival Trailblazer Award. The film received mixed reviews; however, one commented that "newcomer Emily Beecham plays a young woman determined to take the veil and holds her own well against such stalwarts as Brenda Blethyn and Susannah York". Film columnist Hannah McGill, the Edinburgh Festival's artistic director from 2006 to 2010, decided that Beecham should be one of the recipients of the coveted Skillset Trailblazer Award. That year, Beecham gave her first professional stage performance in Ian McHugh's first play, How to Curse, at the Bush Theatre in Shepherd's Bush, London, directed by the theatre's artistic director Josie Rourke. In 2011, she received the Best Actress award at the London Independent Film Festival.

Beecham has appeared in numerous television series, including Agatha Christie's Marple, Tess of The D'Urbervilles, Silent Witness and The Street. She was listed in Nylon magazine's "Young Hollywood" issue as one of 55 "Faces of the Future", with the photograph captioned "Young Hollywood London". John Rankin, Esquire magazine's veteran glamour photographer, was quoted as saying that she has "that something special, that thing you just feel about someone... she's one of the most exciting actresses out there".

In 2013, Beecham starred as Caro Allingham in The Village, and as The Widow in the AMC martial arts action drama series Into the Badlands. In 2016, she had a supporting role in the Coen Brothers movie Hail, Caesar!. One year later she played the title role in Daphne, which earned her a nomination for the Best Actress award at the British Independent Film Awards. In 2019, she starred in the film Little Joe, for which she received the Best Actress award at the Cannes Film Festival. She also appeared in the Netflix series 1899, created by Jantje Friese and Baran bo Odar. A period mystery/horror blend, the series was cancelled after one season despite being one of the service's highest-rated shows at the time.

In March 2024 it was announced that she had joined the cast of the upcoming period drama series King & Conqueror as Edith Swan-neck.

== Filmography ==
=== Film ===
Year	Title	Role	Notes
2007	28 Weeks Later	Karen	
2007	Rise of the Footsoldier	Kelly	
2009	The Calling	Joanna	
2010	Basement	Pru	
2016	Hail, Caesar!	Diedre	
2017	Daphne	Daphne	Nominated—BIFA for Best Performance by an Actress in a British Independent Film; Nominated—Evening Standard British Film Award for Best Actress; Nominated—Evening Standard British Film Award for Breakthrough of the Year; Nominated—Empire Award for Best Female Newcomer
2019	Berlin, I Love You	Hannah	
2019	Little Joe	Alice	Cannes Film Festival Award for Best Actress
2021	Outside the Wire	Sofiya	
2021	Cruella	Catherine Miller	
2023	Guy Ritchie's The Covenant	Caroline Kinley	
2023	My Mother's Wedding	Georgina	
2023	Stockholm Bloodbath	Christina Gyllenstierna	
2024	Slingshot	Zoe	
2024	William Tell	Gertrude	
2026	Supergirl	Alura In-Ze	
TBA	The Queen of Fashion †	Lucy Birley	Post-production

=== Television ===
Year	Title	Role	Notes
2006	Afterlife	Sash	Episode: "Roadside Bouquets"
2007	The Innocence Project	Rachel	1 episode
2007	Agatha Christie's Marple	Elvira Blake	TV movie
2007	Party Animals	Vienna Lurie	1 episode
2007	New Tricks	Laura Small	1 episode
2007	The Bill	Angela Myatt	1 episode
2008	Lewis	Nell Buckley	Episode: "And The Moonbeams Kiss The Sea"
2008	Tess of the d'Urbervilles	Retty Priddle	2 episodes
2009	Unforgiven	Lucy Belcome	3 episodes
2009	The Street	Gemma	2 episodes
2009	Merlin	Emmyria	1 episode
2010	Silent Witness	Anna Flannery	2 episodes
2012	Case Sensitive	Mary Trelease	2 episodes
2012	Damages	Rutger's Daughter	1 episode
2013	The Thirteenth Tale	Isabelle Angelfield	TV movie
2013	Blandings	Miss Younghusband	1 episode
2013–2014	The Village	Caro Allingham	Main cast
2014	The Musketeers	Adele Besset	1 episode
2015–2019	Into the Badlands	The Widow	Main cast
2021	The Pursuit of Love	Fanny Logan	Main cast (miniseries)
2022	1899	Maura Franklin	Main cast
2025	King & Conqueror	Edith	Main cast

=== Video games ===
Year	Title	Role	Notes
2008	Mirror's Edge	Celeste "Cel" Wilson	Voice
