= Alien Left Hand =

Studio album by Janette Mason
- Released: 26 January 2009 (UK)
- Genre: Jazz
- Label: Fireball Records (FMJP 1481)

Janette Mason chronology
Din and Tonic (2005)	Alien Left Hand (2009)	D'Ranged (2014)

Alien Left Hand is the second album by British jazz pianist Janette Mason. It was released on 26 January 2009 by Fireball Records and features Julian Siegel on saxophone, Tom Arthurs on trumpet and Lea DeLaria on vocals.

== Reception ==
Professional ratings
Review scores
Source	Rating
The Guardian	4/5 stars

John Fordham, in a four-starred review for The Guardian, said: "Mason came out of the session shadows in 2005 with her fine Din and Tonic album, and Alien Left Hand develops that set's cross-genre vision, infectious grooving, clever composing and audacious improvisations".

Clive Davis, in The Sunday Times, said: "A foil to that raucous stand-up-turned-singer Lea DeLaria, Mason is a forceful pianist in her own right. The Partisans saxophonist Julian Siegel adds a punch to an infectious and intelligent set. The no-nonsense pulse of Four Wheel Drive gets business off to a brisk start. Mason knows better than to outstay her welcome; her solos are succinct and cliché-free, Josh Giunta's crisp drumming giving her ample support".

John Bungey, in The Times, said: "Mason has a sharp ear for melodic improvisation. Her compositions veer from cross-genre workouts to two plangent ballads. An imaginative cover of Eurythmics’ Sweet Dreams is a standout."

Daryl Easlea, for BBC Music, described Alien Left Hand as "a graceful and often surprising piano-based work that will further enhance the reputation of Janette Mason... {whose] arrangement skills are exemplary. Nothing here is over-egged, and all solos economically underline the players' talents... What strikes you most is Alien Left Hand's pacing, for, even in its quietest moments, it seldom drags. For something new, punchy and accessible with an appropriate measure of funk, blues and jazz, this is worth seeking out."

Alien Left Hand was nominated for the Parliamentary Jazz Awards in 2010.

== Track listing ==
All tracks written by Janette Mason, except where noted.

1. "Wheel Drive" – 7:10
2. "The Blues Walked Out" – 5:09
3. "Sweet Dreams" (Annie Lennox, David A. Stewart) – 8:09
4. "Mae's Song" – 6:45
5. "Dominatrix" – 6:11
6. "NY Cab Ride" – 7:03
7. "Some Other Time" (Leonard Bernstein) – 6:12
8. "Alien Left Hand Syndrome" – 5:10

== Personnel ==
- Janette Mason – piano, Hammond organ, keyboards
- Lea DeLaria – vocals
- Julian Siegel – saxophones
- Josh Giunta – drums
- Tom Arthurs – trumpet
