= Din and Tonic =

Studio album by Janette Mason
- Released: 6 May 2005 (UK)
- Recorded: May 2003 and February 2004
- Genre: Jazz
- Label: Fireball Records (FMJP10001 )

Janette Mason chronology
Din and Tonic (2005)	Alien Left Hand (2009)

Din and Tonic is the debut album by British jazz pianist Janette Mason. It was released in 2005 by Fireball Records and features vocalist Lea DeLaria and saxophonist Mornington Lockett.

== Reception ==
Professional ratings
Review scores
Source	Rating
The Guardian	4/5 stars

John Fordham, in a four-starred review for The Guardian, described Din and Tonic as "a triumph of elegant themes, catchy hooks, fierce swing, classy execution and uncompromising openness to improvisation. It's beautifully recorded, the production duties also being down to Mason, who presumably knows a studio's potential like the back of her hand. Nothing in this pianist's live jazz work (though she's often sounded like a shrewdly thoughtful accompanist who nonetheless keeps a tight rein on her own desires to get in on the act) has hinted at the breadth and maturity of this set, or the playing and composing skills it reveals."

== Track listing ==
All tracks written by Janette Mason, except where noted.

1. "Din and Tonic" – 7:30
2. "Urban Chant" – 7:12
3. "Hymn to Life" – 7:25
4. "November Blues" (Janette Mason, Lea DeLaria) – 6:01
5. "Moon River" (Henry Mancini, Johnny Mercer) – 5:59
6. "Still Dreaming?" – 5:43
7. "The Restraint of Passion" – 7:28
8. "911-144 The Last Call" – 7:28

== Personnel ==
- Janette Mason – piano, Hammond organ, keyboards
- Lea DeLaria – vocals
- Mornington Lockett – soprano and tenor saxophones
- Dudley Phillips – acoustic bass
- Mary Ann McSweeney – acoustic bass
- Simon Pearson – drums
- Martin Shaw – trumpet
- Jamie Talbot – alto saxophone
- Mark Nightingale – trombone
