= Red Alert (Janette Mason album) =

Studio album by Janette Mason
- Released: 2017 (CD); 2018 (vinyl)
- Studio: Masterchord Studio and The Blue Studio, London
- Genre: Jazz, funk
- Label: Dot Time (DT9072)
- Producer: Janette Mason and Andrew Tulloch

Janette Mason chronology
D'Ranged (2014)	Red Alert (2017)

Red Alert is the fourth album by British jazz pianist Janette Mason. It is the first of her albums to be released on vinyl as well as in digital format and as a CD. Dot Time Records issued the CD (and accompanying digital release) in 2017 and the vinyl recording in March 2018.

== Reception ==
Reviewing the album for The Guardian, John Fordham said: "With album Red Alert, London pianist Janette Mason’s trio – fuelled by energies from the Bad Plus, David Bowie, Goldfrapp, Robert Wyatt and plenty more – uncork a typically eclectic, skilful and audience-friendly brew."

== Track listing ==
All tracks written by Janette Mason, except where noted.

1. "Pent Up" – 5:51
2. "Skating on Thin Ice" – 6:34
3. "Evil of All Roots" – 5:02
4. "Bridge 2 – London" (traditional; arranged by Janette Mason) – 0:30
5. "SiSi" – 5:17
6. "Red Alert" – 6:22
7. "Bridge 1 – Westminster" (traditional; arranged by Janette Mason) – 0:49
8. "The Yearning" – 8:25
9. "Altered Reality" – 3:41
10. "I See Seven" – 5:33

== Personnel ==
- Janette Mason – piano and synthesiser
- Jack Pollitt – drums
- Tom Mason – acoustic and electric bass
