= Ashley McGuire =

British actress

Ashley McGuire is a British actress, known for her roles as Big Mandy in the BBC comedy series This Country, Vicky Houghton in the BBC One series This Is Going to Hurt, Shakira in the Channel 4 comedy series Man Down and Bev Slater on the BBC soap opera EastEnders.

== Life and career ==
McGuire attended Rose Bruford College of Speech and Drama. McGuire has portrayed various TV roles, including Malory Towers, Coronation Street, Dead Boss, Small Axe, Decline and Fall, It's a Sin and Jack and the Beanstalk: After Ever After. She has also appeared as Shakira in Man Down, "Big" Mandy Harris in This Country and Bev Slater in EastEnders.

Her stage work includes Home by Nadia Fall (2012 and 2013), Light Shining in Buckinghamshire (2015) and Top Girls (2019) by Caryl Churchill, Our Country's Good by Timberlake Wertenbaker (2015), and The Suicide by Suhayla El-Bushra (2016), all at the Royal National Theatre. Susannah Clapp, a theatre critic for The Observer, wrote about McGuire's portrayal of Falstaff in Phyllida Lloyd's all-female Henry IV at the Donmar Warehouse (2014): "A magnificent Falstaff... she is glorious. A one-person vindication of the all-female enterprise. If it were needed."

== Stage ==
Year	Theatre	Play	Role	Ref.
2006	Battersea Arts Centre	Saved or Destroyed		
2008; 2009; 2010	Canal Café Theatre; Pleasance, Edinburgh; Pleasance, Inner London	I'll Always Think of You That Way	Alison	
2010	Soho Theatre	Fatal Light	Maggie	
2011	Theatre Uncut	Housekeeping	Joan	
2012; 2013	National Theatre	Home	Sharon	
2014	Donmar Warehouse	Henry IV	Falstaff	
2015	National Theatre	Our Country's Good	Dabby Bryant	
2015	National Theatre	An Oak Tree		
2015	National Theatre	Light Shining in Buckinghamshire	Vagrant	
2016	National Theatre	The Suicide	Sarah and Margaret Thatcher	
2016	Lyric Hammersmith	Shopping and F***ing	Brian	
2017	Bush Theatre	Hir	Paige	
2019	National Theatre	Top Girls	Dull Gret	

== Filmography ==
Year	Category	Title	Role
2001	TV series	The Savages	Frightening girl
2001	TV series	Casualty	Julie
2003	TV series	Murphy's Law	Maid
2004	Feature film	England Expects	Dawn
2004	TV series	EastEnders	Carol
2005	Feature film	Gypo	Penny
2007	Feature film	Ruby Blue	Debbie
2008	Feature film	Caught in a Trap	Prison inmate
2009	TV series	The Bill (series 24)	Stella Tanner
2009	Feature film	Harry Brown	Community WPC
2010	Feature film	Baseline	Susan
2010	Feature film	Harry Potter and the Deathly Hallows – Part 1	Death Eater #9
2010	TV series	Miranda	Meals on Wheels lady
2010	TV series	Law & Order: UK (series 4)	Simone Lewis
2011	Feature film	Harry Potter and the Deathly Hallows – Part 2	Death Eater #9
2011	TV series	Coronation Street	Ginny Portis
2012	Feature film	The Grind	Linda
2012	TV series	Dead Boss	Slasher
2012	TV series	Trollied	Millionth customer
2012	TV series	4Funnies	Cheryl
2013	TV series	Derek	Shelley
2013	TV series	The Job Lot	Dawn Carter
2013	TV series	The IT Crowd	Homeless lady
2013	TV series	Obsession: Dark Desires	Stalking neighbour
2013–2017	TV series	Man Down	Shakira
2014	Feature film	Gold	Rosie
2014	TV series	In the Club	Annette Harris
2014	Feature film	The Riot Club	Police officer 2
2014	Feature film	Chewing Gum Blap	Mary
2014	Short	Counting Backwards	Flo Brown
2015	Feature film	Hector	Chiropodist
2016	Feature film	David Brent: Life on the Road	Mo
2016	Feature film	Bridget Jones's Baby	Midwife
2017	Short	Double Act	Casting Director
2017	TV series	Decline and Fall	Lady Circumference
2017–2020	TV series	This Country	Mandy Harris
2018	Short	Relativity	Mrs Ryder
2018	Short	Little Shit	Mum
2018	Feature film	Solo: A Star Wars Story	Lodge Human Trainer (uncredited)
2018	TV series	Wanderlust	Janet Malherbe
2018–2019	TV series	EastEnders	Bev Slater
2019	Feature film	The Hustle	Policewoman
2019	Feature film	Eternal Beauty	Jean (uncredited)
2019	Feature film	The Gentlemen	Maureen
2020–2024	TV series	Malory Towers	Matron Kathleen
2020	TV film	Small Axe – Alex Wheatle	Cook
2020	TV series	Jack and the Beanstalk: After Ever After	Mayoress
2021	TV series	It's a Sin	Lorraine Fletcher
2021	TV series	Angela Black	Judy
2022	TV series	This Is Going to Hurt	Ms Vicky Houghton
2023	Feature film	Northern Comfort	Esther
2023	TV series	The Change	Bernadette
