= Ruby Blue (film) =

- Directed by: Jan Dunn
- Written by: Jan Dunn
- Produced by: Elaine Wickham; Jeremy Burdek; Mark Foligno; Nadia Khamlichi; Justin Lanchbury; James O'Donnell; Adrian Politowski; Karl Richards; Charles Finch; Sally Greene; Alison Rayson; Frances Patterson
- Starring: Bob Hoskins; Josiane Balasko
- Cinematography: Ole Bratt Birkeland
- Edited by: Emma Collins
- Music by: Janette Mason
- Production companies: Medb Films; E-MOTION; Target Entertainment
- Distributed by: Guerilla Films
- Release date: 25 April 2008
- Running time: 106 minutes
- Country: United Kingdom
- Language: English

Ruby Blue is a 2008 British drama directed and written by Jan Dunn and starring Bob Hoskins and Josiane Balasko.

== Plot ==
Jack sinks into depression following the death of his wife. The arrival of a mysterious Frenchwoman in the neighborhood will change his life. Jack will then gradually discover the truth about this enigmatic woman.

== Cast ==
- Bob Hoskins as Jack
- Josiane Balasko as Stephanie
- Jody Latham as Ian
- Josef Altin as Frankie
- Jessica Stewart as Florrie
- Shannon Tomkinson as Stacey
- Sean Wilton as Dick
- Angelica O'Reilly as Rosie
- Ashley McGuire as Debbie
- Chloe Sirene as Cecile
- Michael Mills as Joey
- Sam Talbot as Sean
- Nicola Stewart as Sean's wife
- Corinna Powlesland as Suzy
- Joel Clark Ackerman as Tony
- Lisa Payne as The policewoman
- James O'Donnell as The policeman
- Rebecca Clow as DCI Cartwright

== Production ==
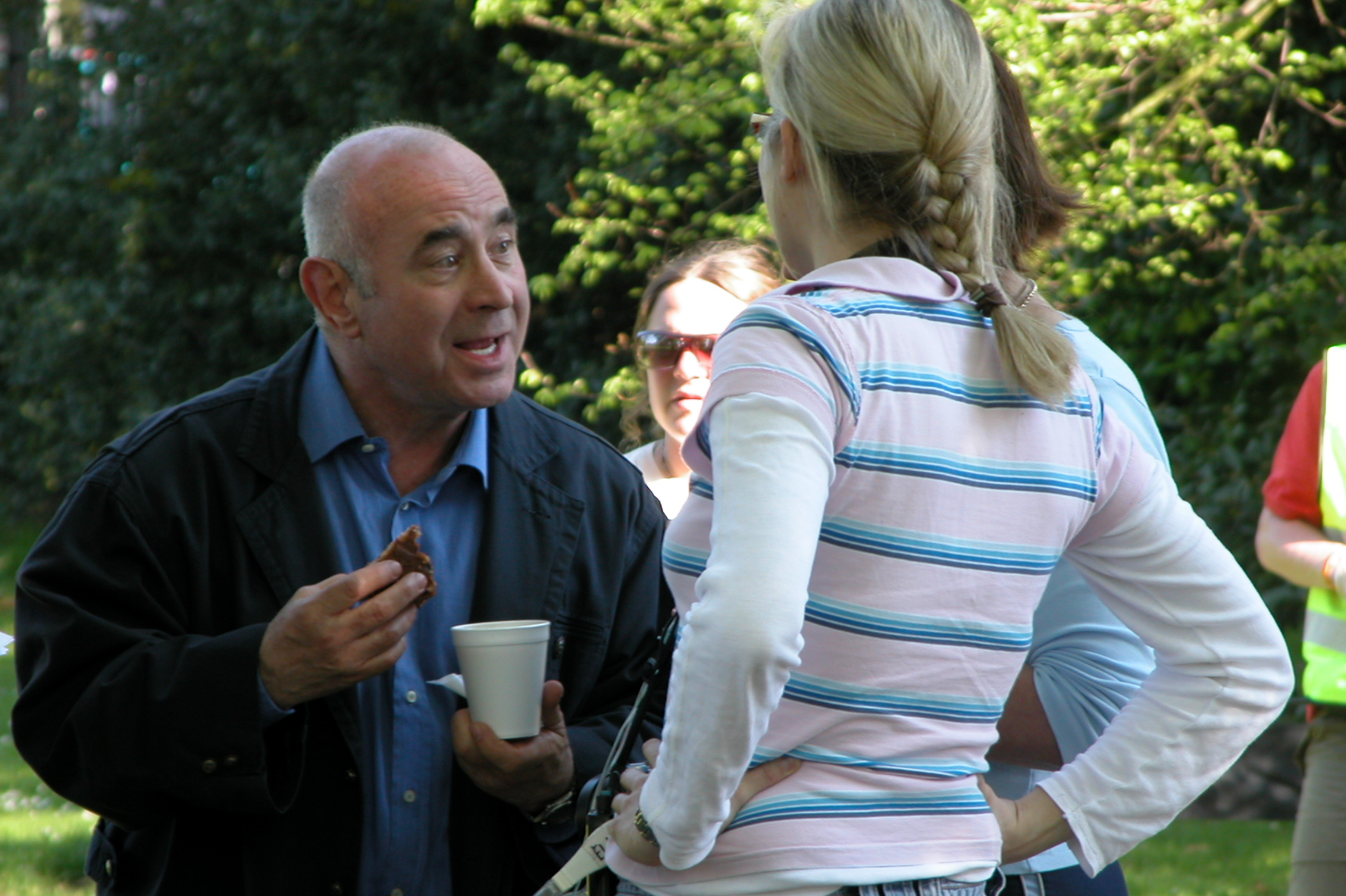
Bob Hoskins on the set of Ruby Blue, February 2008

The filming took place in Kent at Ramsgate, Deal and Barnsole Vineyard.

The movie was presented in several Film Festivals like the Dinard Festival of British Cinema (France), the Warsaw International FilmFest (Poland), the Cinequest International Film Festival (USA), the London Independent Film Festival (UK) and the Frameline Film Festival (USA).

== Accolades ==
Year	Award	Category	Recipient	Result
2008	Chicago Gay and Lesbian International Film Festival	Best Feature Length Narrative	Jan Dunn	Won
2008	London Independent Film Festival	Best British Film	Jan Dunn	Won
2008	Moondance International Film Festival	Best Director	Jan Dunn	Won
2008	Oxford International Film Festival	Best Actor	Bob Hoskins	Won
2008	DC Independent Film Festival	Best Feature	Jan Dunn	Won
