= Bob Hoskins =

English actor (1942–2014)

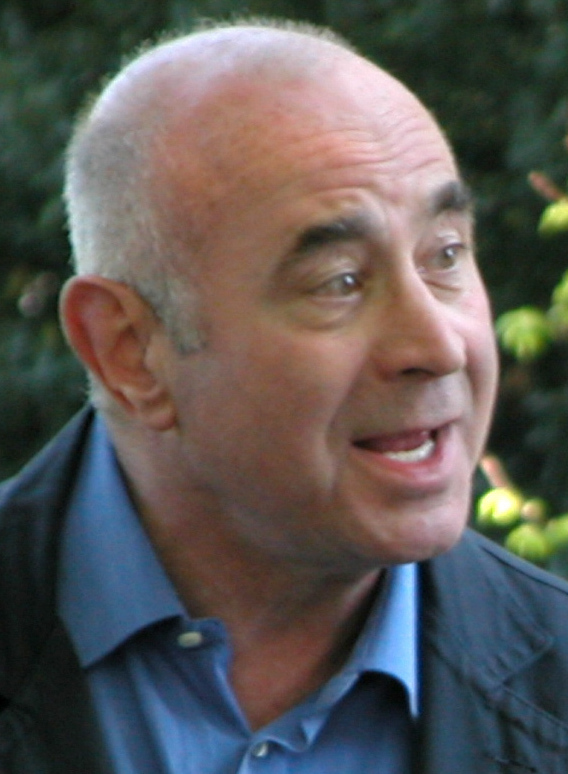
- Hoskins in 2006
- Born: Robert William Hoskins; 26 October 1942; Bury St Edmunds, Suffolk, England
- Died: 29 April 2014 (aged 71); London, England
- Burial place: Highgate Cemetery, London
- Occupations: Actor; film director
- Years active: 1968–2012
- Spouses: Jane Livesey (m. 1967; div. 1978) Linda Banwell (m. 1982)
- Children: 4

Robert William Hoskins (26 October 1942 – 29 April 2014) was an English actor and film director. Known for his intense but sensitive portrayals of "tough guy" characters, he began his career on stage before making his screen breakthrough playing Arthur Parker in the 1978 BBC Television serial Pennies from Heaven. He subsequently played acclaimed lead roles in the films The Long Good Friday (1980), Mona Lisa (1986), Who Framed Roger Rabbit (1988), Mermaids (1990), TwentyFourSeven (1997), Felicia's Journey (1999), Noriega: God's Favorite (2000), Last Orders (2001), The Good Pope: Pope John XXIII (2003) and Ruby Blue (2008).

Hoskins had supporting roles in Pink Floyd – The Wall (1982), The Honorary Consul (1983), The Cotton Club (1984), Brazil (1985), Hook (1991), Nixon (1995), Enemy at the Gates (2001), Maid in Manhattan (2002), Mrs Henderson Presents (2005), A Christmas Carol (2009), Made in Dagenham (2010) and Snow White and the Huntsman (2012). He additionally portrayed Mario in Super Mario Bros. (1993), based on the video game franchise of the same name, and voiced Boris Goosinov in the animated film Balto (1995). Hoskins additionally directed a pair of feature films: The Raggedy Rawney (1988) and Rainbow (1996).

Hoskins received the BAFTA, Golden Globe and Cannes Film Festival Award for Best Actor as well as a nomination for the Academy Award for Best Actor for his role in Mona Lisa. He won a Canadian Genie Award for Best Actor in a Leading Role for Felicia's Journey. In 2009, he won an International Emmy Award for Best Actor for his appearance on the BBC One drama The Street. Hoskins retired from acting in 2012 owing to Parkinson's disease after being diagnosed the previous year. He died in April 2014 from pneumonia.

== Early life ==
Robert William Hoskins was born in Bury St Edmunds, Suffolk, England, on 26 October 1942, the son of Elsie (née Hopkins), a cook and nursery school teacher, and Robert Hoskins, a bookkeeper and lorry driver. One of his grandmothers was Romani. From two weeks old, he was brought up in the Finsbury Park area of London. He attended Stroud Green Secondary School, where he was written off as "stupid" because of his dyslexia. He left school at 15 with a single O-Level and worked as a porter, lorry driver, plumber, and window cleaner. He started but did not complete a three-year accountancy course. He spent six months on a kibbutz in Israel and two years tending to the camels of a Bedouin tribe in Syria.

== Career ==
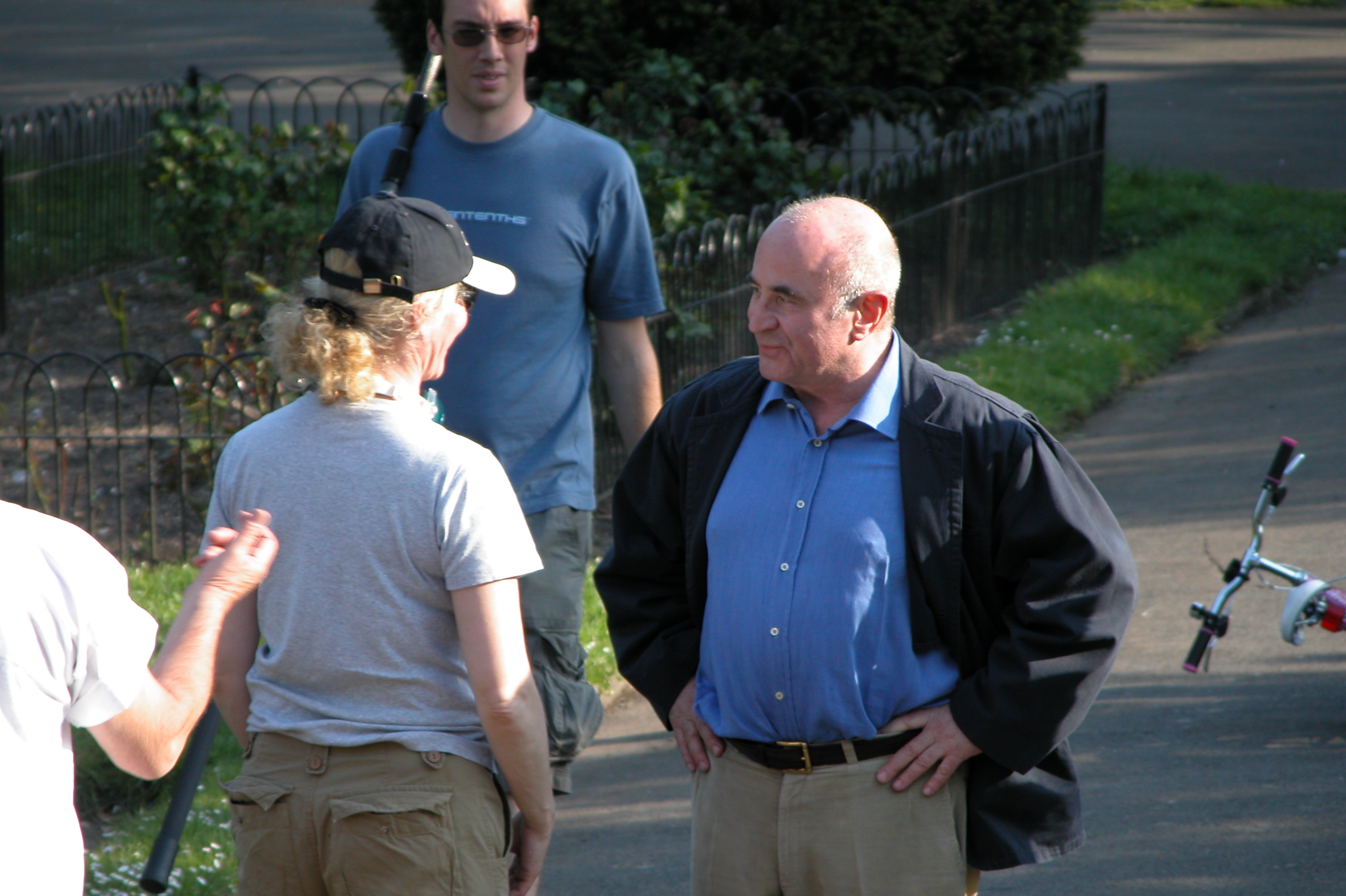
Hoskins filming Ruby Blue in 2006

Hoskins's acting career began in 1968 at the Victoria Theatre in Stoke-on-Trent, in a production of Romeo and Juliet in which he played a servant named Peter. A year later, while waiting in the bar at London's Unity Theatre for his friend, the actor Roger Frost, Hoskins found himself being auditioned for a play after being handed a script and told, "You're next." His audition was successful and Frost became his understudy. Frost considered Hoskins "a natural", recalling that "he just got up on stage and was brilliant".

In late 1969, he was part of Bolton's Octagon Theatre outreach troupe, which became the Ken Campbell Roadshow. Hoskins's London theatre career included portraying a "vigorous" Alfred Doolittle in a West End production of Bernard Shaw's Pygmalion opposite Diana Rigg at the Albery Theatre in 1974, and in a Royal Shakespeare Company production of Eugene O'Neill's The Iceman Cometh at the Aldwych Theatre in 1976 as Rocky the bartender, opposite Patrick Stewart. In 1981, he starred with Helen Mirren in The Duchess of Malfi at the Royal Exchange Theatre, Manchester and the London Roundhouse.

In 1974, Hoskins co-starred with John Thaw in the sitcom Thick as Thieves for London Weekend Television. He also appeared in On the Move (1975–1976), a BBC educational drama series directed by Barbara Derkow aimed at tackling adult illiteracy. He portrayed the character Alf Hunt, a removal man who had problems reading and writing. According to producer George Auckland, up to 17 million people watched the series. His breakthrough in television came later in the original BBC version of Dennis Potter's six-part drama Pennies from Heaven (1978), in which he portrayed adulterous sheet music salesman Arthur Parker. He later played Iago (opposite Anthony Hopkins) in Jonathan Miller's BBC Television Shakespeare production of Othello (1981). In 1983, Hoskins voiced an advert for Weetabix and, during the late 1980s and early 1990s, he appeared in advertising for British Gas and British Telecom (now BT Group). His other television work included Flickers (1980), portraying Wilkins Micawber in David Copperfield (1999), and Badger in The Wind in the Willows (2006).

British films such as The Long Good Friday (1980) and Mona Lisa (1986) won him the wider approval of critics, the latter film winning him a Cannes Award, Best Actor Golden Globe, BAFTA Award, and an Academy Award nomination for Best Actor. Hoskins's other film parts included Spoor in Terry Gilliam's Brazil (1985), Smee in Hook (1991) and in Neverland (2011), starring opposite Cher in Mermaids (1990), portraying Nikita Khrushchev as a political commissar in Enemy at the Gates (2001), and playing Uncle Bart, the violent psychopathic "owner" of Jet Li in Unleashed (2005, aka Danny the Dog). He had a small role as the protagonist's rock and roll manager in The Wall (1982) and, in 1997, had a cameo as Ginger Spice's disguise in the Spice Girls' film, Spice World. He directed two films that he also starred in: The Raggedy Rawney (1988) and Rainbow (1996), and produced Mrs Henderson Presents alongside Norma Heyman, for which he was nominated for the Golden Globe for Best Supporting Actor.

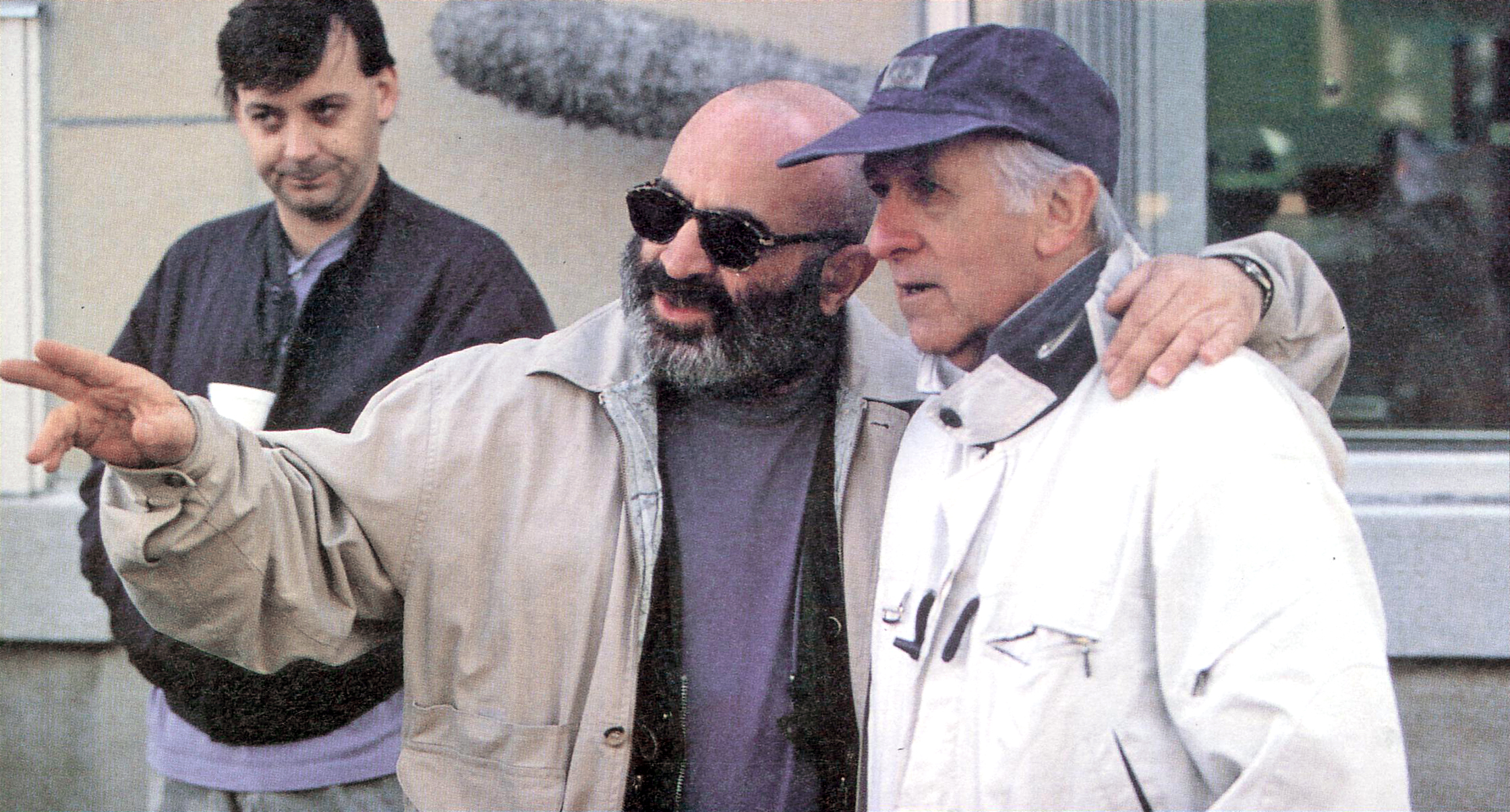
Hoskins and Freddie Francis on location in Montreal for Rainbow in 1994

A high point in Hoskins's career was portraying the Los Angeles private investigator Edward "Eddie" Valiant in the live-action/animated family blockbuster Who Framed Roger Rabbit (1988). Hoskins was not the first choice for the role – several leading American actors including Eddie Murphy were considered. Film critics, among them Gene Siskel and Roger Ebert, agreed that Hoskins was perfect for it. As his character interacts and makes physical contact with animated characters in the film, Hoskins was required to take mime training courses in preparation. He experienced hallucinations for months after production on the film had ended. He was nominated for a Golden Globe Award and won a British Evening Standard Award for his performance.

Hoskins's portrayal of Valiant was one of several roles where he used an American accent; he was described by Trey Barrineau of USA Today as having "a knack for playing Americans better than most American actors could". Others included Rocky the bartender in the play The Iceman Cometh (1976), gangster Owney Madden in Francis Coppola's The Cotton Club (1984), Gus Klein in Wolfgang Petersen's Shattered (1991), Mario in Super Mario Bros. (1993), J. Edgar Hoover in Oliver Stone's Nixon (1995), and Eddie Mannix in Hollywoodland (2006). He was among the actors considered to play Robert De Niro's role of Al Capone in The Untouchables (1987).

In a 1988 interview with the NPR radio show Fresh Air's Terry Gross, when asked about many of his roles being underworld types, Hoskins said, "I think if you've got a face like mine you don't usually wind up with the parts that Errol Flynn played, you know?" Hoskins told The Guardian in 2007 that he regretted starring as Mario in Super Mario Bros., saying that he was extremely unhappy with the film, greatly angered by his experiences making it, and referring to it as the "worst thing I ever did". Hoskins was injured several times on set, spent most of the time with co-star John Leguizamo getting drunk to escape boredom, and was not aware that the film was based on a video game until he was informed later by his son. In a 2011 interview, he was asked, "What is the worst job you've done?", "What has been your biggest disappointment?", and "If you could edit your past, what would you change?" His answer to all three was Super Mario Bros.

In 2007, Hoskins appeared in the music video for Jamie T's single "Sheila". In 2009, he returned to television for Jimmy McGovern's drama series The Street, playing a publican who opposes a local gangster. For this role, he received his only Emmy: Best Actor at the 2010 International Emmys. The 2011 film In Search of La Che features a character "Wermit," whose every line of dialogue is a quote from Hoskins.

On 8 August 2012, Hoskins announced his retirement from acting, having been diagnosed with Parkinson's disease in 2011.

== Personal life ==
With his first wife Jane Livesey, Hoskins had two children: Alex (b. 1968) and Sarah (b. 1972). With his second wife, Linda Banwell, he had two more children: Rosa (b. c. 1983) and Jack (b. c. 1985). Hoskins divided his time between the Hampstead area of London and Chiddingly, East Sussex.

Later in life, Hoskins gave up drinking alcohol. He said that his wife persuaded him to go sober.

When asked in an interview which living person he most despised, Hoskins named Tony Blair and said, "He's done even more damage than Thatcher." He hated Blair to the point that he decided in 2010, for the first time in his life, not to vote for Labour, by then led by Gordon Brown.

Hoskins often made light of his similarities with film actor Danny DeVito, who he joked would play him in a film about his life.

== Death ==
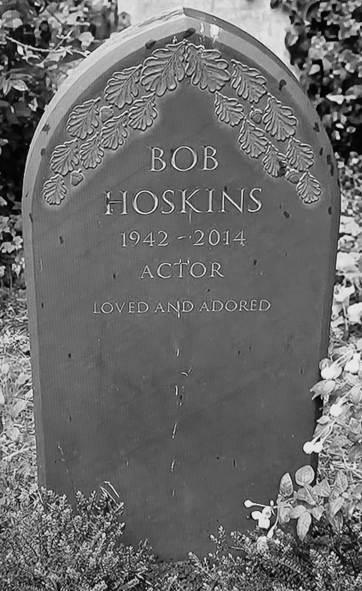
Hoskins's grave in Highgate Cemetery

Hoskins died on 29 April 2014 of pneumonia at a London hospital, aged 71. He was survived by his wife Linda and his four children.

Among the actors who paid tribute at Hoskins's funeral were Stephen Fry, Samuel L. Jackson, and Helen Mirren. He is buried in Highgate Cemetery in London.

== Filmography ==
=== Film ===
Year	Title	Role	Notes
1972	Up the Front	Recruiting sergeant	
1973	The National Health	Foster	
1975	Royal Flash	Police Constable	
1975	Inserts	Big Mac	
1979	Zulu Dawn	CSM Williams	
1980	The Long Good Friday	Harold Shand	
1982	Pink Floyd – The Wall	Band manager	
1983	The Honorary Consul	Colonel Perez	
1984	Lassiter	Inspector John Becker	
1984	The Cotton Club	Owney Madden	
1985	The Dunera Boys	Morrie Mendellsohn	
1985	Brazil	Spoor	
1986	Sweet Liberty	Stanley Gould	
1986	Mona Lisa	George	
1987	A Prayer for the Dying	Father Michael Da Costa	
1987	The Lonely Passion of Judith Hearne	James Madden	
1988	Who Framed Roger Rabbit	Eddie Valiant	
1988	The Raggedy Rawney	Darky	Also director
1990	Heart Condition	Jack Moony	
1990	Mermaids	Lou Landsky	
1991	The Favour, the Watch and the Very Big Fish	Louis Aubinard	
1991	Shattered	Gus Klein	
1991	Hook	Smee	
1991	The Inner Circle	Lavrentiy Beria	
1992	Passed Away	Johnny Scanlan	
1992	Blue Ice	Sam Garcia	
1993	Super Mario Bros.	Mario Mario	
1993	The Big Freeze	Sidney	
1995	Nixon	J. Edgar Hoover	
1995	Balto	Boris Goosinoff	Voice role
1996	Rainbow	Frank Bailey	Also director
1996	The Secret Agent	Verloc	
1996	Michael	Vartan Malt	
1997	Twenty Four Seven	Alan Darcy	
1997	Spice World	Himself as Ginger Spice's disguise	Cameo
1998	Cousin Bette	Cesar Crevel	
1999	Parting Shots	Gerd Layton	
1999	Captain Jack	Jack Armistead	
1999	Felicia's Journey	Hilditch	
1999	A Room for Romeo Brass	Steven Laws	
1999	The White River Kid	Brother Edgar	
2000	American Virgin	Joey	
2001	Enemy at the Gates	Nikita Khrushchev	
2001	Last Orders	Ray "Raysie" Johnson	
2002	Where Eskimos Live	Sharkey	
2002	Maid in Manhattan	Lionel Bloch	
2003	The Sleeping Dictionary	Henry	
2003	Den of Lions	Darius Paskevic	
2004	Vanity Fair	Sir Pitt Crawley	
2004	Beyond the Sea	Charlie Maffia	
2005	Unleashed	Bart	
2005	Son of the Mask	Odin	
2005	Mrs Henderson Presents	Vivian Van Damm	
2005	Stay	Dr. Leon Patterson	
2006	Paris, je t'aime	Bob Leander	Segment: "Pigalle"
2006	Garfield: A Tail of Two Kitties	Winston	Voice role
2006	Hollywoodland	Eddie Mannix	
2007	Sparkle	Vince	
2007	Outlaw	Walter Lewis	
2007	Ruby Blue	Jack	
2007	Go Go Tales	The Baron	
2008	Doomsday	Bill Nelson	
2009	A Christmas Carol	Mr. Fezziwig / Old Joe	Motion capture and voice role
2010	Made in Dagenham	Albert	
2011	Will	Davey	
2012	Outside Bet	Percy "Smudge" Smith	
2012	Snow White and the Huntsman	Muir	

=== Television ===
Year	Title	Role	Notes
1972	The Main Chance	Workman	Episode: "Acting for Self"
1972	Villains	Charles Grindley	3 episodes
1972	Kate	Heavy	Episode: "A Nice Rest"
1972–1974	Play for Today	Various	3 episodes
1973	Omnibus	Grimaldi	Episode: "It Must Be Something in the Water"
1973	Crown Court	Freddie Dean	Serial: "Crime in Prison"
1973	New Scotland Yard	Eddie Wharton	Episode: "Weight of Evidence"
1973	Sir Yellow	Episode: "I Tag Along With Thee"	
1973	Softly, Softly: Task Force	Parker	Episode: "Signed Off"
1974	Shoulder to Shoulder	Jack Dunn	Episode: "Outrage"
1974	Thick as Thieves	Dobbs	8 episodes
1975–1976	On the Move	Alf	
1975	Thriller	Sammy Draper	Episode: "Kill Two Birds"/"Cry Terror"
1976	The Crezz	Detective Sergeant Marble	Episode: "A Flash of Inspiration"
1977	Van der Valk	Johnny Palmer	Episode: "Dead on Arrival"
1977	Rock Follies of '77	Johnny Britten	Episode: "The Real Life"
1978	Pennies from Heaven	Arthur Parker	Miniseries
1979	Of Mycenae and Men	Mr. Taramasalatopoulos	Television short
1980	Flickers	Arnie Cole	Miniseries
1981	BBC Television Shakespeare	Iago	Episode: Othello
1983	The Beggar's Opera	Beggar	Television film - BBC
1985	Mussolini and I	Benito Mussolini	Miniseries
1985	The Dunera Boys	Morrie Mendellsohn	2 episodes
1993	Performance	De Flores	Episode: The Changeling
1994	World War II: When Lions Roared	Winston Churchill	2 episodes
1995–1999	The Forgotten Toys	Teddy	Voice; 26 episodes
1996	Tales from the Crypt	Redmond	Episode: "Fatal Caper"; Also director
1998	Saturday Night Live	Himself/Sam Kidd	Episode: "Greg Kinnear/All Saints"
1999	David Copperfield	Wilkins Micawber	Miniseries
2000	Noriega: God's Favorite	Manuel Noriega	Television film
2000	Don Quixote	Sancho Panza	Television film - TNT
2001	The Lost World	Professor George Challenger	Television film
2003	Frasier	Coach Fuller	Episode: "Trophy Girlfriend"
2003	The Good Pope: Pope John XXIII	Angelo Roncalli/Pope John XXIII	Television film
2006	The Wind in the Willows	Badger	Television film
2008	The Englishman's Boy	Damon Ira Chance	2 episodes
2008	Pinocchio	Geppetto	2 episodes
2008	The Last Word Monologues	Unnamed hitman	Episode: "A Bit of Private Business"
2009	The Street	Paddy Gargan	2 episodes
2011	Neverland	Smee	2 episodes

== Awards and nominations ==
Year	Awards	Category	Nominated work	Result	Ref.
1979	British Academy Television Awards	Best Actor	Pennies from Heaven	Nominated	
1981	Evening Standard British Film Awards	Best Actor	The Long Good Friday	Won	
1982	British Academy Film Awards	Best Actor in a Leading Role	The Long Good Friday	Nominated	
1982	Laurence Olivier Awards	Best Actor in a Musical	Guys and Dolls	Nominated	
1984	British Academy Film Awards	Best Actor in a Supporting Role	The Honorary Consul	Nominated	
1986	Boston Society of Film Critics	Best Actor	Mona Lisa	Won	
1986	Kansas City Film Critics Circle Award	Best Actor	Mona Lisa	Won	
1986	Los Angeles Film Critics Association	Best Actor	Mona Lisa	Won	
1986	Valladolid International Film Festival	Best Actor	Mona Lisa	Won	
1987	Academy Awards	Best Actor	Mona Lisa	Nominated	
1987	British Academy Film Awards	Best Actor in a Leading Role	Mona Lisa	Won	
1987	Cannes Film Festival	Best Actor	Mona Lisa	Won	
1987	Golden Globe Awards	Best Actor in a Motion Picture – Drama	Mona Lisa	Won	
1987	London Film Critics' Circle	Actor of the Year	Mona Lisa	Won	
1987	National Society of Film Critics	Best Actor	Mona Lisa	Won	
1987	New York Film Critics Circle	Best Actor	Mona Lisa	Won	
1989	Evening Standard British Film Awards	Best Actor	Who Framed Roger Rabbit / The Lonely Passion of Judith Hearne	Won	
1989	Golden Globe	Best Actor in a Motion Picture – Musical or Comedy	Who Framed Roger Rabbit	Nominated	
1996	Screen Actors Guild Awards	Outstanding Performance by a Cast in a Motion Picture	Nixon	Nominated	
1997	European Film Awards	Best Actor	Twenty Four Seven	Won	
2000	Canadian Screen Awards	Best Actor	Felicia's Journey	Won	
2001	European Film Awards	Best Actor	Last Orders	Nominated	
2001	National Board of Review	Best Acting by an Ensemble	Last Orders	Won	
2001	Satellite Awards	Best Actor – Miniseries or Television Film	Noriega: God's Favorite	Nominated	
2004	DVD Exclusive Awards	Best Supporting Actor	The Sleeping Dictionary	Won	
2005	British Independent Film Awards	Best Performance by an Actor in a British Independent Film	Mrs Henderson Presents	Nominated	
2005	National Board of Review	Best Acting by an Ensemble	Mrs Henderson Presents	Won	
2005	St. Louis Film Critics Association	Best Supporting Actor	Mrs Henderson Presents	Nominated	
2006	Golden Globe Awards	Best Supporting Actor – Motion Picture	Mrs Henderson Presents	Nominated	
2006	Golden Raspberry Awards	Worst Supporting Actor	Son of the Mask	Nominated	
2008	Oxford International Film Festival	Best Actor	Ruby Blue	Won	
2010	British Independent Film Awards	Best Supporting Actor	Made in Dagenham	Nominated	
2010	International Emmy Awards	Best Actor	The Street	Won	

== See also ==
- List of British actors
- List of Academy Award winners and nominees from Great Britain
- List of actors with Academy Award nominations
