= Gypo (film) =

2005 film by Jan Dunn

- DVD cover
- Directed by: Jan Dunn (not credited, per Dogme rules)
- Written by: Jan Dunn
- Starring: Pauline McLynn, Chloe Sirene; Paul McGann
- Distributed by: Lionsgate
- Release date: 2005
- Running time: 98 minutes
- Country: United Kingdom
- Language: English
- Budget: £300,000

Gypo /ˈdʒɪpoʊ/ is a 2005 British independent film written and directed by Jan Dunn. Its story details the breakdown of a family in a small town in Britain, told in three narratives. Within a structured screenplay the dialogue throughout was improvised.

Although the movement was dissolved in 2005, the filmmakers continued to develop independent and experimental films using or influenced the concept, which being the first film made in the post-Dogme 95 movement.

== Plot ==
Gypo follows the disintegration of a working-class family in a small English coastal town after their teenage daughter befriends a young Romani refugee from the Czech Republic. The story is told through three overlapping perspectives — Paul, Helen, and Tasha — with key events revisited from each character's point of view, exposing contradictions in memory and motive. As the friendship between the daughter and Tasha develops, neighborhood suspicion, institutional indifference, and private tensions within the household escalate into confrontations that reveal prejudice, fear, and personal failings.

The film's Rashomon‑like structure forces the audience to weigh competing versions of the same incidents, gradually uncovering hidden motives and small betrayals that contribute to the family's breakdown. Stylistically, Gypo employs a naturalistic, improvisatory approach influenced by Dogme 95, using handheld camerawork and improvised dialogue to create a documentary‑adjacent immediacy. The climax dramatizes the social and personal consequences for both the family and Tasha, and the film closes on an ambiguous note that resists tidy moral resolution.

== Production ==
The production filmed entirely in Thanet in Kent at a variety of locations including East Kent College, Kingsgate Bay, Margate, Pegwell Bay, Port of Ramsgate, Ramsgate, Royal Harbour Hotel and the Wig & Pen pub.

== Cast ==
- Pauline McLynn as Helen
- Paul McGann as Paul
- Chloe Sirene as Tasha
- Rula Lenska as Irina
- Tamzin Dunstone as Kelly
- Tom Stuart as Darren
- Barry Latchford as Jimmy
- Olegar Fedoro as Tasha's Father
- Freddie Connor as Tasha's Husband
- Josef Altin as Michael
- Ashley McGuire as Penny

== Reception ==
In The Guardian, Peter Bradshaw gave the film 3 out of 5 stars, writing that "A warm and generous performance from Pauline McLynn carries this minimalist Dogme movie by Jan Dunn...", criticizing it for having "a bit of shouty youth-theatre improv acting", but praising the movie for its twists and depiction of Margate "as a place of pretty cold comfort for asylum seekers", comparing it to Last Resort. Empire's Anna Smith gave the film the same score, comparing it to Last Resort as well, finding that with "time and patience, however, it’s a rewarding insight into cross-cultural friendships and their ability to change lives." ViewLondon gave the film 4 out of 5 stars, comparing the film's narrative structure to Rashomon, concluding it "also makes some thought-provoking points regarding society's attitude to asylum-seekers."

== Awards ==
- British Independent Film Awards Best Achievement in Production
- San Francisco Gay and Lesbian Film Festival Best First Feature

Plus two other nominations and Special Mention at Torino International Gay and Lesbian Film Festival
