= Pauline McLynn =

Irish character actress and author (born 1962)

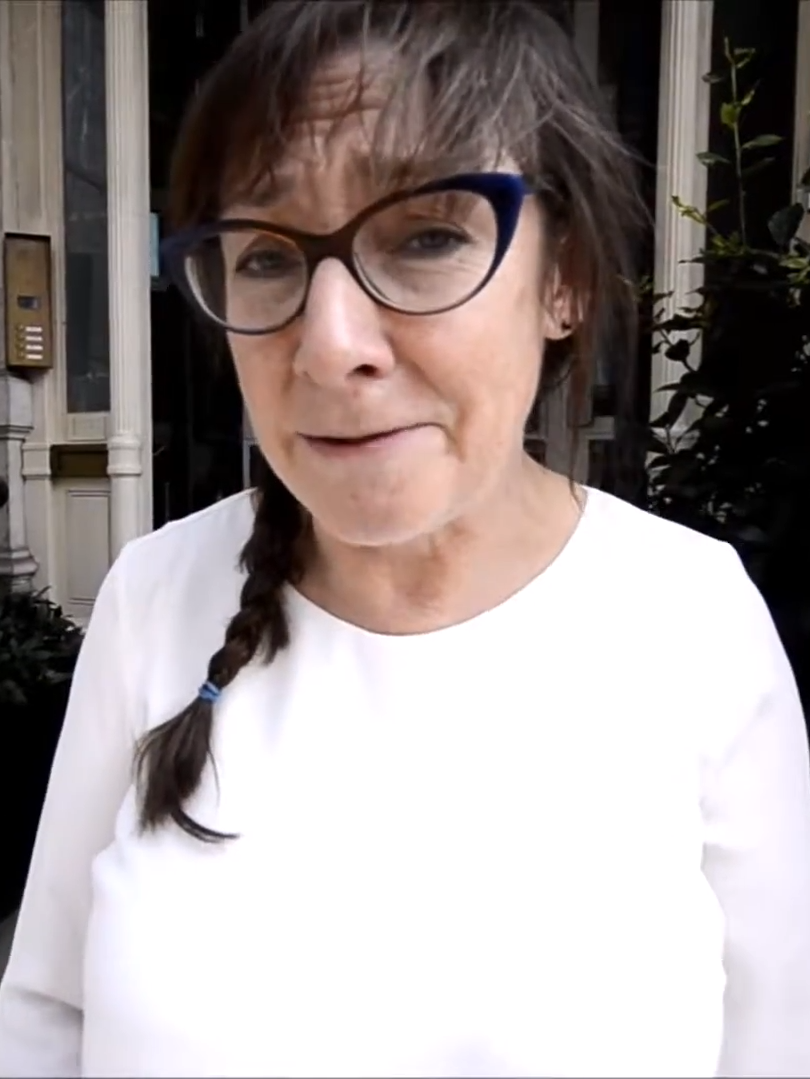
- McLynn in 2016
- Born: 11 July 1962 (age 64); Sligo, County Sligo, Ireland
- Occupations: Actress; author
- Years active: 1986-present
- Spouse: Richard Cook (m. 1997)
- Website: paulinemclynn.com

Pauline McLynn (born 11 July 1962) is an Irish actress and author. She is best known for her roles as Mrs. Doyle in the Channel 4 sitcom Father Ted, Libby Croker in the Channel 4 comedy drama Shameless, Tip Haddem in the BBC One comedy Jam & Jerusalem, Yvonne Cotton in the BBC soap opera EastEnders, and Maggie Driscoll in the ITV soap opera Coronation Street.

== Early life ==
McLynn was born in Sligo, and grew up with two younger brothers in Galway. She studied History of Art and Modern English at Trinity College Dublin, but was more heavily involved in the college's drama society. She graduated with an MA.

== Career ==
Although McLynn was in her early thirties when playing Mrs Doyle in Father Ted, makeup was used to make her look far older to fit the character's elderly profile. She received a British Comedy Award for her performances in 1996. The award was presented to her by Tony Blair.

Subsequent televised appearances included a similar elderly role in the "Yesterday Island" episode of youth sci-fi series Life Force, sketches on Bremner, Bird and Fortune, and panel shows Just a Minute, Have I Got News for You, and If I Ruled the World. In 1999, McLynn appeared in the film adaptation of Angela's Ashes. She also appeared in Jennifer Saunders' Jam & Jerusalem. Between 2001 and 2003 she reprised Mrs Doyle in an advert for online tax return filing by the Inland Revenue.

McLynn was critically acclaimed for her performance in the 2005 film Gypo, receiving an Irish Film and Television Award nomination for Best Actress.

McLynn appeared in Shameless, which was produced by the British broadcaster Channel 4, as Libby Croker. In January 2011 it was announced that she had left the show, reportedly after a "difficult year". McLynn also played the role of Alice's mother in the Comedy Central show Threesome. She starred in Samuel Beckett's Happy Days at the Crucible Theatre, Sheffield in 2011.

McLynn played Mary Whyte in the BBC's 2013 sitcom Father Figure.

In 2014, McLynn played the part of Evelyn in "Kiss for the Camera", a series three episode of the BBC comedy Pramface. On 12 May 2014, McLynn joined the cast of EastEnders as Yvonne Cotton, the mother of Charlie Cotton (Declan Bennett) and ex-daughter-in-law of Dot Branning (June Brown). After starting as a recurring character, McLynn quickly became a regular when her character's storylines escalated. She made her final appearance on 13 January 2015, at the end of her contract. However, McLynn returned to the soap opera on 14 May 2015 for one single episode to give evidence against Dot during Nick Cotton's (John Altman) murder trial.

In 2017, McLynn appeared as the mother of lead character Marcella in Roisin Conaty's E4 comedy GameFace, and in April 2018 she portrayed Sister Mary in the BBC Two biopic Dave Allen at Peace. She appears as a minor character named Mrs. Trattner in the 2018 film Johnny English Strikes Again.

In 2020, McLynn was one of the celebrity pilgrims on the Sultans Trail in the BBC series Pilgrimage: Road to Istanbul. She also appeared in Riverdance: The Animated Adventure.

In 2021 McLynn appeared as Oona in the E4 S6 of Inside No. 9. She also appeared as Carol, a bar landlady, in the film Last Night in Soho, which was released in October 2021. McLynn also appeared in Doctor Who, as Mary in the New Year's special "Eve of the Daleks".

Since 2018, McLynn has featured as one of three panellists on the RTÉ Radio programme "Sure 'Twas Better", starring alongside screenwriter Jules Coll, and author and journalist Emer McLysaght, the programme being presented by Will Hanafin.

Since October 2025, McLynn has played the role of Maggie Driscoll in ITV's Coronation Street, alongside former Shameless co-star Aaron McCusker.

== Personal life ==
McLynn is married to theatrical agent Richard Cook. She is a patron of the children's charity World Vision Ireland and is president of Friends of Innisfree Housing Association. She is also a patron of Birmingham Greyhound Protection< and Littlehill Animal Rescue & Sanctuary in Ireland.

McLynn is a fan of the Premier League football team Aston Villa. She says her best moment supporting Villa came in 1996 when she watched them beat Leeds United in the Football League Cup final with her Father Ted co-star Ardal O'Hanlon, who is a Leeds supporter. McLynn was raised as a Roman Catholic, but is now an atheist.

McLynn is involved with many charities against the racing and export of greyhounds. She is a patron of Greyhound Protection UK.

== Filmography ==
=== Film ===
Year	Film	Role	Notes
1992	Far and Away	Prostitute	
1994	Joey's Christmas	Joey's Mum	Short film
1995	Guiltrip	Joan	
1996	My Friend Joe	Ms. Doyle	
1997	Electricity	Lydia Lipp	Short film
1999	Angela's Ashes	Aunt Aggie	
2000	Nora	Miss Kennedy	
2000	Quills	Mademoiselle Clairwill	
2000	When Brendan Met Trudy	Nuala	
2000	The Most Fertile Man in Ireland	Maeve	
2000	An Everlasting Piece	Gerty	
2001	Iris	Maureen	
2002	Gina and Stella	Stella	Short film
2005	Gypo	Helen	
2005	Heidi	Aune Detie	
2005	O	Anne	Short film
2009	Hell's Pavement	Joan O'Connor	
2009	The Calling	Sister Hilda	
2011	First Confession	Miss Ryan	Short film
2014	Noble	Mother Superior	
2016	The Secret Scripture	Anne McCartney	
2017	Transformers: The Last Knight	Female Researcher	
2018	Captain Morten and the Spider Queen	Aunt Annabelle / The Spider Queen (voice)	
2018	Johnny English Strikes Again	Mrs. Trattner	
2019	A Girl from Mogadishu	Social Worker	
2019	Making Noise Quietly	Mildred	
2020	Out!	Joan	Short film
2021	Deadly Cuts	Shelley Sherlock	
2021	Riverdance	Grandma	
2021	Last Night in Soho	Carol	
2024	Man and Witch: The Dance of a Thousand Steps	Goatherd's Mother	

=== Television ===
Year	Title	Role	Notes
1986	The Playboy of the Western World	Honor Blake	Television film
1988	Troubles	Hospital Nurse	Episode: "Episode #1.1"
1988	Commonplaces	Unknown	TV mini-series
1994	Family	Denise	3 episodes
1995–1998	Father Ted	Mrs. Doyle	25 episodes
1996	It Happened Next Year	Various	Television film
1998	Ballykissangel	Bella Mooney	2 episodes
1998	Her Own Rules	Constable Williams	Television film
1999	Aristocrats	Susan Fox-Strangways	2 episodes
1999	Dark Ages	Agnes	5 episodes
2000	Life Force	Polly Phemus	Episode: "Yesterday Island"
2000–2002	TV to Go	Various	2 episodes
2001	Black Day at Black Rock	Grace	Television film
2002	Dalziel and Pascoe	Dr. Kirsty Urquhart	2 episodes
2003	The Return	Laura Dunmore	Television film
2004	French and Saunders	Enthusiastic Fan	Episode: "Episode #6.6"
2004	Animated Tales of the World	Various (voice)	Episode: "The Boy Who Had No Story"
2005	The Island of Inis Cool	Various (voice)	Animated series
2006–2009	Jam & Jerusalem	Tippi Haddem	17 episodes
2007	High Hopes	Esmeralda	Episode: "The Hunchback of Notre Dame"
2007	Bremner, Bird and Fortune	Various	Episode: "Episode #11.1"
2009	Demons	Karen Speedwell	Episode: "Nothing Like Nebraska"
2010–2011	Shameless	Libby Croker	24 episodes
2011	The Bleak Old Shop of Stuff	Maggoty	Episode: "Christmas Special"
2011–2012	Threesome	Lorraine	5 episodes
2013	Common Ground	Peggy the Homeless Lady	Episode: "Eleanor"
2013	Father Figure	Mary Whyte	6 episodes
2013–2014	Pramface	Evelyn	2 episodes
2014	GameFace	Marcella's Mum	Television film
2014–2015	EastEnders	Yvonne Cotton	Recurring role; 27 episodes
2014–2019	Bing	Gilly	7 episodes
2016	Tracks	Mrs. Moore	Episode: "Origin: Episode Three"
2017–2019	GameFace	Mum	6 episodes
2017–2019	Drop Dead Weird	Bunni	52 episodes
2018	Dave Allen at Peace	Sister Mary	Television film
2018	Alien: Sea of Sorrows	Colleen O'Rourke	Podcast series
2018	Trollied	Pat O'Banton	Episode: "The Wedding"
2020	The Young Offenders	Psychologist	Episode: "Episode #3.3"
2021	Inside No. 9	Oona	Episode: "Hurry Up and Wait"
2021	Silent Witness	Mary Thorpe	2 episodes
2022	Doctor Who	Mary	Series 13; Episode: "Eve of the Daleks"
2022	Holding	Eileen O'Driscoll	4 episodes
2022	Rosie Molloy Gives Up Everything	Win Molloy	6 episodes
2023	The Inheritance	Coroner	3 episodes
2024	Bodkin	Brónagh McArdle	2 episodes
2025–present	Coronation Street	Maggie Driscoll	Regular role

== Awards and nominations ==
Year	Award	Category	Title	Result
1996	British Comedy Award	Top TV Comedy Actress	Father Ted	Won
2006	Torino International Gay & Lesbian Film Festival	Special Mention: Best Video	Gypo	Won
2007	Irish Film and Television Award	Best Actress in a Lead Role in a Feature Film	Gypo	Nominated

== Novels and children's books ==
=== Leo Street private eye series ===
Something for the Weekend (2000)
Better Than a Rest (2001)
Right on Time (2003)

=== Stand-alone novels ===
The Woman on the Bus (2004)
Summer in the City (2005)
Bright Lights and Promises (2007)
Missing You Already (2009)
The Time is Now (2010)

=== Children's books ===
Jenny Q, Stitched Up! (also known as Jenny Unstitched) (2012)
Jenny Q, Unravelled (2013)
