= Aidan O'Callaghan =

Irish actor and producer (born 1988)

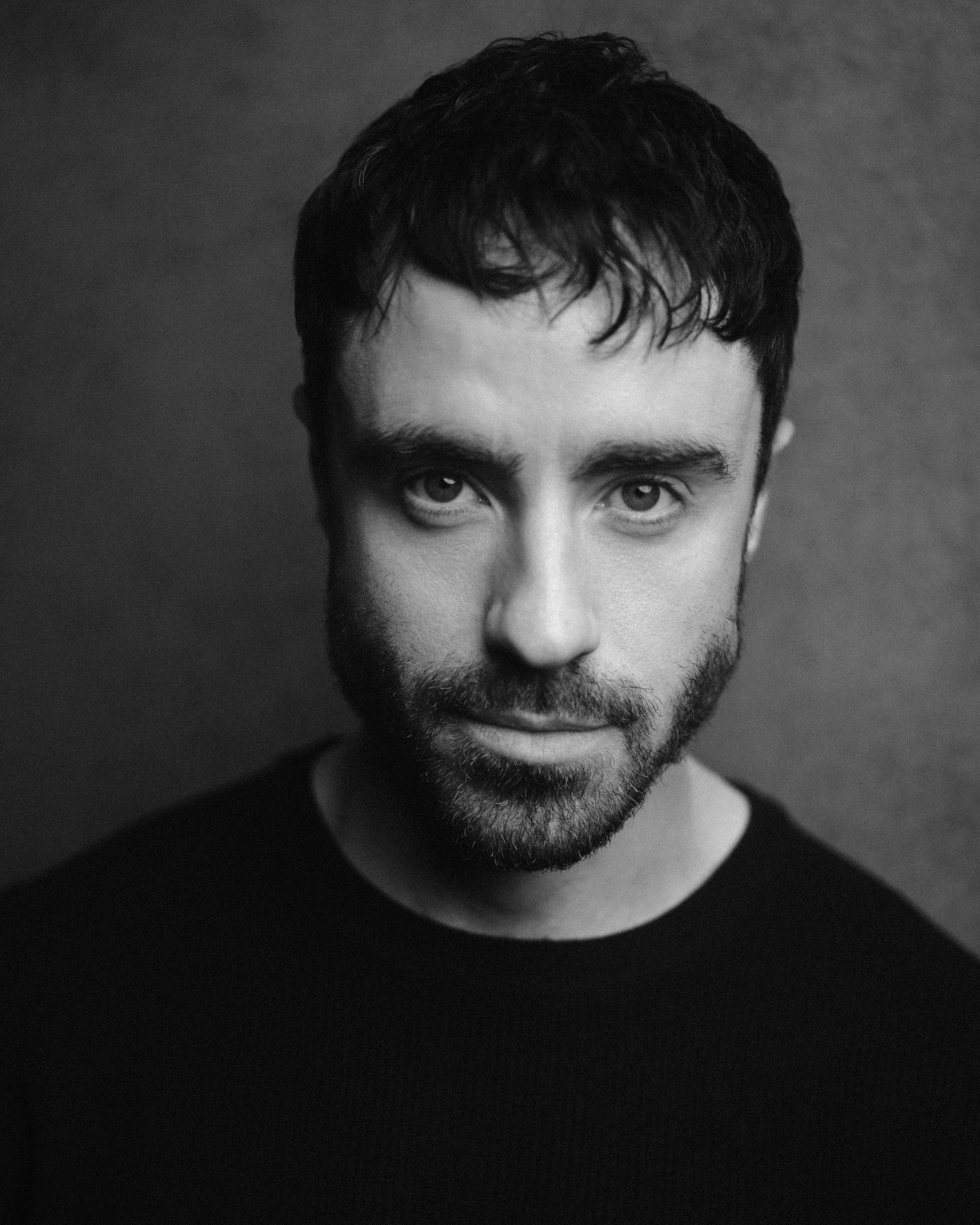
- Born: Aidan O'Callaghan; 25 November 1988 (age 37); County Cork, Ireland
- Occupations: Actor, Producer
- Years active: 2009–present
- Notable work: The Witcher: Blood Origin, Wolfe, The Rook, EastEnders, Coronation Street

Aidan O'Callaghan (born 25 November 1988) is an Irish actor best known for roles in television and film, including The Witcher: Blood Origin, Wolfe, The Rook, EastEnders, Emmerdale and Coronation Street.

== Career ==
O'Callaghan portrayed Kareg in the Netflix series The Witcher: Blood Origin, a prequel to The Witcher series. Kareg is a member of the Dog Clan, an ancient warrior group sworn to protect the royal family of Xin'Trea. The cast included Lenny Henry, Mirren Mack, Michelle Yeoh and Laurence O'Fuarain.

He has appeared in Emmerdale, EastEnders and Coronation Street and has also worked on notable international projects like Wolfe and The Rook.

In 2024, O'Callaghan appeared in the short film A Simple Killing, which won the Judges’ Choice Award and Audience Award at the Waterford International Film Festival, and screened at the Newport Beach Film Festival, Raindance Film Festival, and the BAFTA- and Oscar-qualifying Foyle Film Festival.

In 2025, O'Callaghan played Col in the feature film The Reckoning of Erin Morrigan, Erin Morrigan's (Olwen Fouere) former lover and IRA operative. The film was nominated for Best Film and screened at the Chicago International Film Festival and Galway Film Fleadh. Aidan will play a series regular on season 2 the BAFTA Scotland nominated series An t-Eilean in 2027.

== Filmography ==
=== Television ===
- The Witcher: Blood Origin - Role: Kareg Stoneheart (Netflix, fantasy/action)
- An t-Eilean - Role TBA Series Regular crime/thriller)
- Wolfe - Role: Jake (crime/thriller)
- The Rook - Role: Alan (mystery/drama)
- Emmerdale - Role: Mike (ITV long-running UK continuing drama)
- EastEnders - Role: Lewis Butler (BBC long-running UK continuing drama)
- Coronation Street - Role: Alan Driscoll (ITV long-running continuing drama)

=== Movies ===
- The Reckoning of Erin Morrigan - Role: Col
- A Simple Killing - Role: Terry
- Somatic - Role: George Watson
- Clash of the Dead - Role: Elias

== See also ==
- List of Irish actors
