= Jess Robinson =

British actress (born 1982/1983)

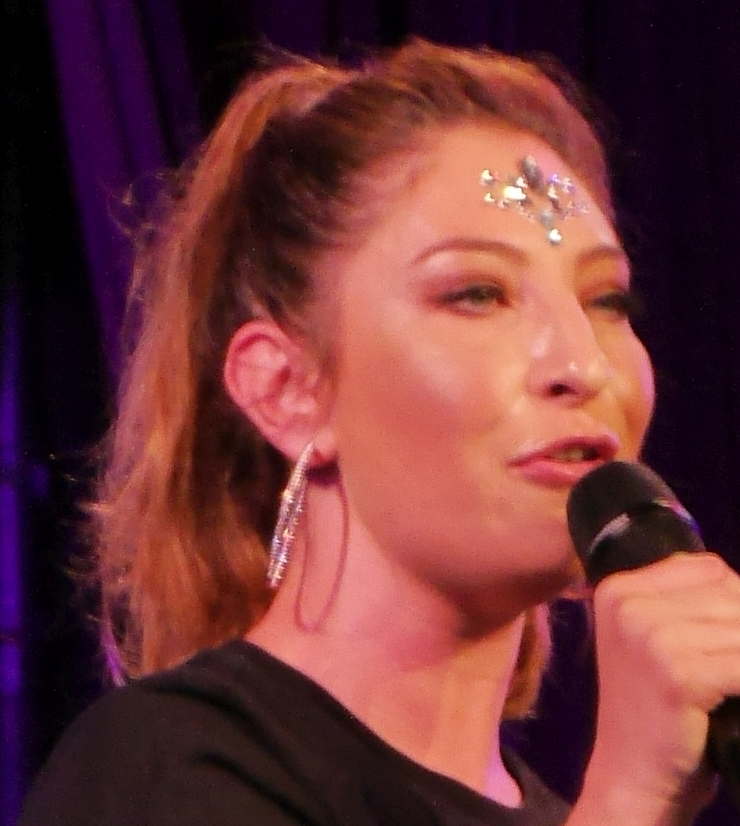
- Robinson at the Glastonbury Festival, 2019
- Born: 1982 or 1983 (age 42–43); Edgware, London, England
- Education: The Arts Educational School, Tring Park
- Occupations: Comedy actress, singer and impressionist
- Known for: Spitting Image 2020 and podcast Stars in Your Ears
- Spouse: Jonty Fisher
- Website: www.jessrobinson.co.uk

Jess Robinson's voice
from the BBC programme Newsjack, 25 June 2009.

Jess Robinson (born 1982/1983) is a British comedy actress, singer, impressionist, voice artist and comedian.

== Early life ==
Robinson was born in Edgware, London, in a non-religious Jewish family, the daughter of a piano teacher and artist, and granddaughter of the jazz pianist Jules Ruben. She grew up in Aldbury, Hertfordshire. Her mother is a teacher and her father was an artist. She attended the Tring Park School for the Performing Arts.

== Career ==
While still at school, Robinson first appeared on stage in the title role of The Rise and Fall of Little Voice, by Jim Cartwright, at the Courtyard Theatre. Her role included imitating the voices of Judy Garland, Marlene Dietrich, Billie Holiday, Edith Piaf and Julie Andrews. Geraldine McNulty appeared as her mother, Marie Hoff.

She performed in the last two series of Dead Ringers on BBC Two. She occasionally appeared as an impressionist but mostly played characters in various sketches to support the stars: Jan Ravens, Jon Culshaw, Mark Perry, Kevin Connelly, and Phil Cornwell.

In the Dead Ringers CBBC spin off 'Spoof!' (part of the Gina's Laughing Gear comedy pilot season), Robinson appeared as Supernanny, Charlotte Church, Konnie Huq and Billie Piper among others. Other appearances include the CBBC talent show The Slammer as part of an impressions double act and as a special guest on Blue Peter.

Robinson provided female impressions on Headcases, an animated satirical show similar to Spitting Image which appeared on ITV from April to June 2008 on Sunday evenings.

In 2009, she appeared as a number of characters in several Big Finish Productions Doctor Who audio plays.

Robinson's TV appearances include Scoop and Comedy Cuts for ITV2 and Gigglebiz.

She appeared in various sketches in the first two series of The Impressions Show with Culshaw and Stephenson. In 2010, director Angie De Chastelai Smith collaborated with producer Charlie Hanson at ITV to make It's Paul Burling! in which Robinson co-starred as the main female impressionist. Her impressions included Cheryl Cole, Stacey Solomon and Kerry Katona. The show, which aired in December 2010 to a television audience of 3.7 million viewers, was a one-hour Christmas special on ITV following Burling's success on talent show BGT.

On radio, Robinson was part of Newsjack for BBC Radio 7, and has also recorded numerous episodes of 15 Minute Musical, The Castle, The Secret World, and radio sitcom, The Music Teacher.

In late 2012, she reprised the role of Little Voice in the UK touring production of The Rise and Fall of Little Voice, among a cast including Beverley Callard, Joe McGann and Ray Quinn.

She participated in the eleventh series of Britain's Got Talent and finished in fifth place at the live semi-finals.

As a voice-over artist, Robinson is the lead voice on Horrible Histories along with Jon Culshaw. She has completed 52 episodes of new animation Bat Pat, playing one of the lead roles; Leo as well as many other characters. She has voiced many promotions on Disney Channel and Disney Junior.

Robinson has worked on many video games including Anno 1404, Venetica, Risen 2: Dark Waters and Risen 3: Titan Lords in which she played the role of Pirate, Patty Steelbeard. Robinson plays popular character of Ivo in Book of Unwritten Tales. In 2016, Robinson appeared as a panellist on The Dog Ate My Homework.

In 2017, Robinson became a voice artist on the CBBC mockumentary The Zoo and on animated Noddy series Noddy, Toyland Detective.

In 2018, she made several higher profile television appearances on The Imitation Game, Don't Hate The Playaz for ITV, and The Last Leg.

In 2020, she became a voice artist on the new series of Spitting Image for BritBox, voicing most of the female characters including: Adele, Melania Trump, Ivanka Trump, Angela Merkel, Taylor Swift, Kim Kardashian, Jacinda Ardern, Greta Thunberg and Gwyneth Paltrow.

In 2020 amid the COVID-19 crisis Robinson joined the supergroup known as The Celebs which now included Frank Bruno and X Factor winner Sam Bailey to raise money for both Alzheimer's Society and Action for Children. They recorded a new rendition of Merry Christmas Everyone by Shakin' Stevens and it was released digitally on 11 December 2020, on independent record label Saga Entertainment. The music video debuted exclusively on Good Morning Britain the day before release. The song peaked at number two on the iTunes pop chart.

In 2021, Robinson's podcast 'Stars in Your Ears' won gold at The British Podcast Awards in The Best Entertainment category, with 'James Acaster's Perfect Sounds' and 'A Gay and a Non Gay' placed in second and third place. Of Robinson's winning podcast, the said "in a very strange year and in a field that is brimming with a lot of entertaining podcasts, this one stood out as bold and totally unique. It's clear that the host spends every second on this podcast having fun with a total commitment of creativity, energy and ambition to the podcast from all involved, that was topped off with outstanding production values. It kept a smile on the judges faces throughout." In each episode of the first two series, made during the COVID-19 lockdown, Robinson and her band – Jessington World Of Adventures impersonate the styles of famous singers, interview a celebrity guest and teach them how to do an impression. Guests have included: Stephen K Amos, Ellie Taylor, Rachel Parris, Deborah Frances-White, Romesh Ranganathan, Gareth Malone, Al Murray, Alex Horne and Rosie Jones.

In November 2021, Robinson appeared on Channel 4's The Last Leg, ostensibly in character as Foreign Secretary Liz Truss, performing karaoke versions of famous songs with lyrics modified satirically.

== Podcast ==
Robinson has a podcast called Stars in Your Ears (2020) In 2021 the podcast won gold for 'Best Entertainment Podcast' at the British Podcast Awards.

== Live shows ==
- Jess Robinson: Mighty Voice (2014)
- Jess Robinson: The Rise of Mighty Voice (2015)
- Jess Robinson: Impressive (2016)
- Jess Robinson: Unravelled (2017)
- Jess Robinson: No Filter (2018)
- Jess Robinson: The Jess Robinson Experience (2019)
- Jess Robinson: LEGACY (2022)

All shows were part of the Edinburgh Festival Fringe.
