= Kate O'Sullivan =

British actress

Kate O'Sullivan is a British actress, singer, voiceover artist and impressionist.

A graduate of Drama Centre London latterly Central Saint Martins, she was taught by Yat Malmgren and Christopher Fettes.

== Theatre ==
Her first job after leaving Drama Centre was in the West End playing Cecily Cardew in The Importance of Being Earnest at the Whitehall Theatre (now Trafalgar Studios) with Hinge and Bracket. She played Magenta, the extraterrestrial French maid, in the 1990/1991 West End revival of Richard O’Brien's The Rocky Horror Show starring Anthony Head and Craig Ferguson at the Piccadilly Theatre and Bristol Hippodrome Theatre. She also went on both the 1991 and 1996 UK tours of The Rocky Horror Show. Other musicals include Lust with Denis Lawson at the Theatre Royal, Haymarket, and Bob Carlton's Keep On Running at Birmingham Rep in which she played the lead Kathleen Karman. O'Sullivan appeared with Eric Sykes in a nationwide tour of Ray Cooney's farce Run For Your Wife. She returned to the role of Barbara, or "Lofty" in Run For Your Wife in a UK tour celebrating the play's 25th Anniversary.

Kate O'Sullivan was featured as a writer/performer in Let The People Decide with Barry from Watford (Edinburgh Fringe) and performed sketches and stand-up with Sketch Department at The Merchant's Hall, Hannover St. She appeared in Q&A: a showcase for new material & improvisation with Steve Furst and Lewis MacLeod at the Leicester Square Theatre.

== Television ==
O'Sullivan appeared in Roy Clarke's comedy Still Open All Hours twice, playing the cameo role of Mrs. Teasdale. She has also appeared in the Gold sitcom The Rebel starring Simon Callow as a rebellious and magnificently sweary pensioner., Henry IX, a comedy for UK Gold, written by Dick Clement and Ian La Frenais. She appeared with Dawn French publicizing her new ITV talent series on The One Show, O'Sullivan recalling her childhood appearances as an impressionist on Crackerjack.

O'Sullivan played vet Sally Freeman in two BBC series of Home Farm Twins based on Jenny Oldfield's novels of the same name. She has appeared in Dead Ringers, Channel 4 film Bill's New Frock, directed by Pete Travis, and was a regular in BBC Scotland sketch show 2000 Not Out with Craig Ferguson. Other TV work includes Armando Iannucci's Time Trumpet, 2004: The Stupid Version, BBC 4's Don't Watch That, Watch This, four series of Bremner Bird and Fortune, and the 2008 CGI BBC3 sketch show The Wrong Door in which she voices a Smutty Alien, The World's Most Annoying Creature and myriad other extra terrestrial/android characters. She also played the lead role of 'Girl' in Dead Cat, a short film directed by Derek Jarman and David Lewis.

== Impressions ==
The first television appearance as an impressionist was as a child on Seaside Special (1976), hosted by Roger Kitter. This was followed by appearances on BBC children's show Crackerjack. In 2DTV (series 4 & 5) O'Sullivan supplied all female impressions/characters. Produced by Giles Pilbrow and directed by Tim Searle with Enn Reitel, Lewis MacLeod, and Dave Lamb. Hedz: comedy sketch show for CBBC/ BBC Scotland. O'Sullivan supplied all female impressions except the Queen, who was voiced by Peter Dickson. (Bafta:- Best Children's Light Entertainment 2008). She appeared in DoubleTake, created by Alison Jackson (BAFTA for Innovation 2001). O'Sullivan's impressions, namely Nancy Dell'Olio and Ulrika Jonsson, featured in Jackson's Sven: The Coach, The Cash And His Lovers for Channel 4. O’Sullivan features as an impressionist in the topical BBC Radio 4 satire starring Rory Bremner Tonight.

Kate O’Sullivan performed stand-up and impressions at the Leicester Square Theatre, the New Players Theatre and Brighton Komedia. She performed in Funny Women Sunday Showcase at the Leicester Square Theatre.

== Radio ==
O'Sullivan plays various roles in the story of the KLF in How To Burn A Million Quid and the roles of Auntie Megs and Zita in new dramatisation of Michael Morpurgo's Alone on a Wide, Wide Sea for BBC Radio 2. For Classic FM: The Pazza Factor: the story of the birth of Classic FM, directed by Bill Dare, producer of Dead Ringers. Written by Sean Grundy and Cara Jennings, it starred Jon Culshaw, Duncan Wisbey as Ralph Bernard and Kate O'Sullivan as Margaret Thatcher. She read for Something Understood, produced by Adam Fowler and presented by Mark Tully, also Radio 4. She was a regular on Radio 4's impression and sketch show starring Lewis Macleod, Duncan Wisbey and Julian Dutton Lewis Macleod Is Not Himself.

A recommendation from Rob Brydon in 1998 secured her first radio job on Five Live's The Treatment. Directed by Steve Punt and Talkwell McCloud, it was hosted by Stuart Maconie from 1994 to 2001. She was a guest on Steve Punt and Hugh Dennis' sitcom The Party Line for Radio 4 and has played Queen Question in BBC7's Quizland for two series. Other radio includes Hot Gas for Radio 1 and The Sharp End, a sitcom for BBC Radio 2 with Alistair McGowan, various in the Framley Examiner Podcast.

BBC Radio 4 productions: What To Do If Your Husband May Leave and Polyoaks the sitcom written by David Spicer and Dr. Phil Hammond, satirizing the government's radical overhaul of the NHS. O'Sullivan plays various roles in Series 2 of Births, Deaths and Marriages, the BBC Radio 4 sitcom by David Schneider and Simon Jacobs. She is also a panellist on Bremner's One Question Quiz with Rory Bremner, Andy Zaltzman and Nick Doody, satirising Britishness, the UK's approach to education, and the environment.

== Blagger's Guide ==
O'Sullivan worked with David Quantick and Lewis MacLeod on 6 series of The Blagger's Guide (2005–2013) for Radio 2. with fake archive footage and spoof adverts supplied by O'Sullivan, MacLeod, and producer Simon Poole. Over the first five series, O'Sullivan plays all female voices, characters, and celebrities, among them Dolly Parton, a schoolgirl Kate Bush, all 3 Shangri-Las, Gary Numan's bride-to-be, and Beethoven's wife. In November 2013, Radio 2 commissioned The Blagger's Guide to Doctor Who as part of its 50th anniversary celebrations, which went on to receive a Sony Radio award nomination.

== Voiceover ==
She has supplied the voiceover for thousands of British television and radio commercials since 1996. Notable campaigns include delivering endlines, impressions, or character voices for brands such as Vodafone's Voxi 'Thumbs', Maybelline, Marks & Spencer, L’Oreal, Vision Express among many others. Currently station voice at Absolute Radio with Matt Berry, O’Sullivan voices for several Bauer Media UK stations in their stable, such as Magic Radio, Jazz FM and Scala Radio. She is part of the creative team which has won many awards for station imaging and innovation over the past ten years, dating back to when the Radio Academy’s ARIAS were called the Sony Awards, and later the Radio Academy Awards. Wins ranged from silver for best Station Imaging (Absolute Radio) at the 2011 Sony Radio Academy Awards (On-Air Marketing Awards category) to Gold Best Single Promo/Commercial at the 2012 Sony Radio Academy Awards.

In 2021, Absolute Radio was nominated in nine categories, including National Station and Network of the Year, Best Station Sound, Best Marketing Campaign, The 2020 Special Award, and Radio Times Moment of the Year. It won Gold at the ARIAS in The Creative Innovation Award category, for its landmark Absolute Radio 40s event to commemorate VE Day during the pandemic. O’Sullivan voiced trails and promos throughout the programme in the style of a 1940s announcer. Her impressions of Queen Elizabeth II, both young and old, addressing the nation, featured throughout the show.

2022 saw 25 nominations for Bauer, of which O’Sullivan voiced: Best Coverage of an Event (Mental Health Awareness Week: Absolute Radio); Best Station Sound (Absolute Radio Country launch) Best Commercial Partnership (Bond 24/7 – No Time To Die and Bauer Media); Best Marketing Campaign (Absolute Radio Country) and Magic Radio 100% Christmas.

2023 sees O’Sullivan as the voiceover for the idents and trails on ‘Absolute Radio Natalie’, named after the lucky winner who won the prize of their very own radio station. It has been nominated for The Creative Innovation Award. O’Sullivan's voice can also be heard on promos for both Mental Health Awareness Week on Absolute Radio, nominated for Best Coverage of an Event, and Absolute Radio’s ‘Hometime with Bush and Richie’, which has been nominated for Best Music Entertainment Show.

O'Sullivan voiced two promos for Nickelodeon (both being SpongeBob's Top 100). They were shown on Nick and Nicktoons. The promo, in which she is doing an impression of the English Queen, won the Bronze Award in the Best Children's Promo (Originated) category of the Promax UK Awards. In a trial for the series about ageing, When I’m 65 for BBC O’Sullivan voices both young and old June Brown eventually morphing both voices into one. The promo won PROMAX Gold in 2012.

== Animation/Video Games ==
Lego Marvel Super Heroes 2 (Video Game) – Captain Marvel/Enchantress/Morgan le Fay/Ravonna (voice).

O'Sullivan was the voice behind all six Singing Sockroaches for Milkshake!, Channel 5's children's channel. The Sockroaches are a gang of mischievous and singing socks who appear in every episode of the animated TV show The Beeps narrated by Tom Baker. Other cartoons: Treasure; MechaNick; Audrey and Friends; and Castle Farm series 1 & 2 (Channel 5), in which she characterizes Farmer, Cow, She-Ba, and Winnie the Hen in the children's animation. She is the voice behind Madam (cow), Mrs. Snuffles (pig), Mrs. Chickens, Mrs. Paw (cat), and Ewerice (sheep) in the CBeebies' series Big Barn Farm (BBC).

O’Sullivan voiced Lara for Star Stable's Mistfall across a series of six episodes.

She supplied the voices of both police officers and suspects in Sony’s action-adventure The Getaway: Black Monday.

== Audiobooks ==
O'Sullivan plays the Queen Mother and Susan the Student, among others, in the audio adaptation of Robert Rankin’s novel Brightonomicon. She is also the voice of Professor Peabody in Orion's 2008 audio version of cult comic strip Dan Dare- Voyage To Venus by Frank Hampson, with Rupert Degas, Tom Goodman-Hill and Christian Rodska.

O’Sullivan voices all characters and narrates The Railway Rabbits audio series and Dead Man's Cove for Orion. She narrates Orion books 1, 2 & 3 of the Charmseekers series by Amy Tree, namely The Queen's Bracelet, The Silver Pool and The Dragon's Revenge, which chronicle Sesame Brown's quest to find the 13 stolen magical charms belonging to Queen Charm of Karisma. The third of the Charmseekers books, as reviewed by The Independent, is 'read with superb versatility by Kate O'Sullivan'.

Barbara Tate’s West End Girls (Orion, 2011) is also ‘wonderfully narrated by Kate O’Sullivan’.

== Writing ==
While co-presenting the children's series, O'Sullivan wrote material for Wham! Bam! Strawberry Jam! (BBC 1995) and was commissioned by Thames TV Head of Comedy John Howard Davies to co-write a sitcom pilot "Different Drummers".

O'Sullivan is part of the writing team for Tonight/Bremner's One Question Quiz (BBC Radio 4, 2011–2015) with Rory Bremner, Andy Zaltzman, Nick Doody, John Langdon, and Geoff Atkinson.

== Trivia ==
As a child, O'Sullivan was awarded the title Crackerjack Young Entertainer of the Year 1978 for her impressions of Frank Spencer, the Muppet Show, Margaret Thatcher and Lena Zavaroni on the popular children's TV show Crackerjack, hosted by Ed "Stewpot" Stewart. On winning the competition, for which 900 other hopefuls had auditioned, she was given an Aiwa sound system, a signed photograph of Bernie Clifton and a coveted Crackerjack pen.
