= Newzoids =

British TV sketch show (2015–2016)

- Genre: Comedy; Satire
- Voices of: Jon Culshaw; Debra Stephenson; Lewis MacLeod; Simon Greenall; Jonathan Clegg; Jess Robinson; Duncan Wisbey; Luke Kempner; Harriet Carmichael
- Country of origin: United Kingdom
- Original language: English
- No. of series: 2
- No. of episodes: 12

Production
- Running time: 30 minutes (inc. adverts)

Original release
- Network: ITV
- Release: 15 April 2015 – 8 October 2016

Related
- Spitting Image; 2DTV; Headcases; Dead Ringers

Newzoids is a British topical satirical sketch show, which was co-produced by Citrus Television and Factory for ITV and broadcast for two series between 15 April 2015 and 8 October 2016.

The programme operated in a similar format to Spitting Image, in its use of puppets and comedic impersonations of celebrities across different fields, such as politics and entertainment, and in basing sketches on current events. However, it differed in that each puppet featured no moveable eyes or mouths, as these were applied with the use of CGI during editing.

Newzoids featured the voice actors Jon Culshaw, Debra Stephenson and Lewis MacLeod, all from the BBC Radio 4 comedy Dead Ringers, and featured satirical appearances by Nigel Farage, Boris Johnson, Jeremy Clarkson and Prince George of Cambridge.

The first series aired during the 2015 United Kingdom general election and spoofed the politicians involved.

== Characters ==
All the celebrities featured in the show are portrayed through the mixed use of live-action puppets and computer-generated imagery effects; the puppets are filmed first, with the footage later enhanced with computer-generated eyes, eyebrows and mouths. The depictions are caricatures. One eye of the-then UK Independence Party leader Nigel Farage’s puppet occasionally swivels around, Donald Trump's hair is represented as a cat on his head, and Prince George of Cambridge is depicted with a strong Cockney accent, bossing about his younger sister, Princess Charlotte of Cambridge. George's catchphrase is “oi oi saveloy”, which loosely references the Cockney football chant.

Theresa May appears in trailers for a new film called Despicable May (a reference to the animated film Despicable Me), in which David Davis, Philip Hammond and Boris Johnson play her minions. They also very occasionally feature as minions in other sketches.

Nigel Farage also appears in trailers for another new film, called UKIP: Fully Loaded (a reference to the film Herbie: Fully Loaded), in which his “tampered” Volvo V70 plays Herbie and the politician plays the role of Nigey Farton (referencing the Maggie Peyton character played by Lindsay Lohan in the Herbie film).

Another new film which is promoted is Pretty Brexiteer (a reference to the film Pretty Woman), in which Farage plays the role of Nigen Ward (referencing the Vivian Ward character played by Julia Roberts in Pretty Woman). The film that is promoted the least is Runaway Tory (a reference to the film Runaway Bride), in which Farage plays the role of Nigey Carpenter (referencing the character of Maggie Carpenter, played by Julia Roberts in the film).

== Transmissions ==
Series	Start date	End date	Episodes
1	15 April 2015	20 May 2015	6
2	3 September 2016	8 October 2016	6

== Reception ==
Newzoids received mixed reviews. Most professional reviewers compared the show negatively to Spitting Image, but it was better received on social media. Tending towards the positive, The Guardian wrote that it was "no Spitting Image, but a step in the right direction", lauding the show's "sparkiness" but adding "its lack of depth feels like a wasted opportunity" in comparison to Spitting Image. The Telegraph wrote that Newzoids had "flashes of promise" and that the showbusiness takedowns in particular "really connected", but commented that the show often "swung at easy targets".

In a more negative review, The Independent mentioned how Newzoids and Spitting Image both had shaky, unfunny starts, but that "the puppets (of Newzoids) are not intrinsically funny", remarking "Oh dear!". VICE panned Newzoids, and said that "it was absolutely untenable. It was lazily, beguilingly shit, each gag so obvious you'd already written the punchline in your head before it was delivered.", asking "how was this allowed to be made?".

Idris Elba, whose puppet was featured in a Luther sketch, reacted positively to his appearance on the show, posting a video on Twitter of him laughing behind the camera as the scene plays on TV, with a caption of laughing emojis.
