= Christina Bianco =

American actress, singer and impressionist

- Born: February 7, 1982 (age 44); Suffern, New York, U.S.
- Education: Tisch School of the Arts
- Occupations: Actress, singer, impressionist
- Website: christinabianco.com

Christina Bianco (born February 7, 1982) is an American actress, singer and impressionist. Bianco is best known for her theatrical work, television appearances and YouTube videos in which she impersonates celebrities, both singing and speaking.

== Career ==
In 2015, Bianco starred in the one-woman, multi-character comedy Application Pending, off-Broadway at the West Side Theatre for which she received her second Drama Desk Award nomination in the Outstanding Solo Performance category. She has appeared in Forbidden Broadway on the West End at London's Vaudeville Theatre, and also starred in the off-Broadway shows Forbidden Broadway Goes to Rehab and Newsical. For her work in Forbidden Broadway Goes To Rehab, Bianco was nominated for the Drama Desk Award for Outstanding Featured Actress in a Musical, but lost to Haydn Gwynne, who won the award for her performance in Billy Elliot the Musical. Bianco originated the role of Dora in the national tour of Dora the Explorer Live, and was a contestant on season six of America's Got Talent, but received no air time. Additional New York credits include playing Missy in The Marvelous Wonderettes and It Must Be Him.

Bianco played the recurring role of Bianca on the sitcom Impress Me on POP TV. The show was produced by Rainn Wilson and SoulPancake and starred Ross Marquand and Jim Meskimen.

In 2016, she appeared as Mindy on Signed, Sealed, Delivered on the Hallmark Channel Movies & Mysteries. She also appeared on Watch What Happens Live on Bravo.

From August 2016, Bianco began touring the United Kingdom with her one-woman show titled "Me, Myself and Everyone Else", performing at the Edinburgh Fringe Festival from August 22 to 27, before traveling around the country. The tour included dates in Somerset, Manchester, Blackpool, Leeds, County Durham, Aberdeen, Glasgow, Dundee, Belfast, Cardiff and London, before it finished in Brighton on September 18.

In December 2017, Bianco wrote a Christmas concert titled "O Come All Ye Divas" for a 15-performance run at Charing Cross Theatre in London. The musical arrangements were created by Bianco and her long time accompanist, Joe Louis Robinson.

Bianco starred as The Narrator in Joseph and the Amazing Technicolor Dreamcoat at the Drury Lane Theatre in Illinois.

Bianco's Celine Dion and Julie Andrews impressions can be heard on RuPaul's Drag Race: All Stars Season 3, episode 2, "Drag Divas Live."

In early 2018, she performed to critical acclaim at the Adelaide Cabaret Festival. In December 2018, Bianco made her Sydney Opera House debut with her Christmas show "O Come All Ye Divas." Soon after, she returned to Australia in January 2019 to perform "Me, Myself and Everyone Else" as part of Fringe World in Perth.

In 2018, Bianco recorded and released her first live album, Life of the Party. The album was crowdfunded by her fans through Indiegogo.

She publicly stated that she planned to return to the Edinburgh Fringe Festival in 2019, before her second UK tour.

Bianco starred in the Paris premiere of the Broadway musical Funny Girl at the Théâtre Marigny through early March 2020. The reviews unanimously praised her performance as well as the production, with The New York Times noting that "much like Streisand, who won an Academy Award for the 1968 film adaptation, Bianco pours irresistible life into the role."

Beginning in March 2022, Bianco played the role of LV in the UK touring production of The Rise and Fall of Little Voice. She starred as Glinda in the 2023 West End revival of The Wizard of Oz at the London Palladium after playing the role at the Curve, Leicester.

== Voice impressions and major television performances ==
In August 2013, a video of Bianco singing "Total Eclipse of the Heart" received over 7 million YouTube views, due in part to a tweet by Shonda Rhimes. In the video, Bianco does voice impressions of 19 different singers. Bianco performed a version of "Total Eclipse of the Heart" on The Ellen Degeneres Show in September 2013. In May 2014, she performed the song in front of its original singer, Bonnie Tyler, on the UK ITV programme, The Paul O'Grady Show. One of Bianco's previous videos, an "Impression Reel" of Katy Perry's "Firework", also includes impressions of famous female singers.

In February 2014, Bianco released a video of herself singing "Let It Go" from Disney's Frozen and the video soon went viral, gaining over 6 million views. In October 2014, Bianco gained attention for her "diva" rendition of the CeeLo Green hit "Forget You".

In February 2015, Bianco appeared on The Today Show. She sang "Natural Woman" on The Queen Latifah Show in August 2014. Bianco has also performed twice on the ITV programme This Morning, once in September 2014 and again in May 2015.

On May 5, 2016, Bianco performed on The Meredith Vieira Show, Season 2, episode 124. Her segment was titled "The Woman With A Thousand Voices" and she performed "Hello" by Adele in the voices of various celebrities. Her accompanist for this was Brad Simmons. Bianco also provided impression vocals for episode 99 and 116.

In the fall of 2018, Bianco appeared on British television on the ITV series The Imitation Game alongside Debra Stephenson, Rory Bremner and Jon Culshaw.
