= The Imitation Game (TV series) =

- Created by: Jon Naismith; Graeme Garden; Ali Crockatt; David Scott
- Directed by: Barbara Wiltshire
- Presented by: Alexander Armstrong
- Starring: Rory Bremner; Debra Stephenson
- Country of origin: United Kingdom
- Original language: English
- No. of series: 1
- No. of episodes: 7

Production
- Producer: Ruth Wallace
- Running time: 40 minutes
- Production companies: Big Talk Productions; Random Entertainment

Original release
- Network: ITV
- Release: 2 September – 28 December 2018

The Imitation Game is a British television game show presented by Alexander Armstrong and starring the impressionists Rory Bremner and Debra Stephenson.

== Overview ==
Each week, two teams (captained by Rory Bremner and Debra Stephenson) go head-to-head re-enacting iconic movie scenes, revoice news footage, cover songs and celebrity voiceovers. The impressions bring celebrities - such as Donald Trump and Holly Willoughby, Boris Johnson and Adele, and Russell Brand and Mary Berry - together into unexpected situations.

== Episodes ==
No.	Guests	Original release date
1	Jess Robinson, Luke Kempner, Christopher Biggins	2 September 2018
2	Jon Culshaw, Christina Bianco, Julian Clary	9 September 2018
3	Jan Ravens, Anil Desai	16 September 2018
4	Kate Robbins, Luke Kempner, Kim Woodburn	23 September 2018
5	Jess Robinson, Lewis MacLeod	30 September 2018
6	Alistair McGowan, William Hague	7 October 2018
7	Highlights show	28 December 2018

== Controversy ==
Rory Bremner revealed in August 2018 that ITV producers had removed an impression of presenter Dale Winton from the programme, after he was found dead at his London home in April.
