= The Impressionable Jon Culshaw =

- Created by: David Albon; Jon Culshaw
- Written by: Jon Culshaw; Jon Holmes; John Junkin; Simon Blackwell; Steve Punt; Joel Morris; Roger Drew; Nick Wood; Richard Hearsey
- Starring: Jon Culshaw; Steve Nallon; Kevin Connelly; Tony Gubba
- Country of origin: United Kingdom
- No. of episodes: 6

Production
- Producer: Richard Hearsey
- Running time: 30 minutes
- Production company: Ronin Entertainment

Original release
- Network: ITV
- Release: 25 February – 31 March 2004

The Impressionable Jon Culshaw is a satire sketch show starring the impressionist Jon Culshaw. A deal with ITV enabled Culshaw to make this while simultaneously starring in BBC Two's Dead Ringers. He also starred in the show Alter Ego, which was shown on ITV and was made prior to The Impressionable Jon Culshaw. The show ran for six episodes in one series from 25 February to 31 March 2004.

The show has been criticised for having too many impressions, with some feeling that Culshaw did not do some of the characters justice. This is unsurprising, as Culshaw's repertoire of impressions numbers over 350. Culshaw used most of the impressions that featured on Dead Ringers, but there were some new ones. Some of the more notable impressions are those of Tony Blair, Gordon Brown, George W. Bush and Trevor McDonald. The show received praise for its production values which were higher than Dead Ringers.

Some of the characters impersonated also featured in person on the show, where they meet Culshaw, who is impersonating them, and they interview themselves. This idea first featured in Alter Ego.
