= Blakewill & Harris =

British television writer duo

Blakewill & Harris (Marc Blakewill and James Harris) are a UK-based comedy writing partnership working in television and radio.

They have written on the popular CBBC sketch shows Horrible Histories and Sorry, I've Got No Head, as well as ITV1 topical animation shows Headcases and 2DTV, Comedy Cuts (ITV2), The Charlotte Church Show and The 11 O'Clock Show (both Channel 4) and The Sitcom Trials (ITV1) - and have written caustic put-downs for Anne Robinson on The Weakest Link (BBC).

Most recently they wrote the pilot for Ace of Clubs, a BBC panel show hosted by Warwick Davis, as well as contributing to Adrian Poynton's BBC Three sitcom White Van Man, starring Will Mellor, four series of Russell Howard's Good News (BBC Three) and the ITV1 Christmas special The All Star Impression Show.

On radio they have written for Week Ending, The Bearded Ladies and This Day (all BBC Radio 4) as well as Grrr (BBC Radio Scotland), Hudd And Quantick's Global Village, The News Huddlines and Parsons & Naylor's Pull-Out Sections (both BBC Radio 2). They have also had topical material performed on BBC Radio 5 Live.

Marc Blakewill & James Harris were awarded the inaugural Fringe Report award for Best Comedy Writers in 2003, were part of the writing team that received a BAFTA nomination for series one of Horrible Histories at the 2009 Children's BAFTAs and were principal writers on the RTS Student Award-nominated sketch show TV or Not TV.

In 2008, James Harris and Marc Blakewill founded Glandoo Productions.
