= Headcases =

2008 television series

- Headcases intertitle
- Created by: Henry Naylor
- Starring: Rory Bremner; Jon Culshaw; Lewis MacLeod; Kayvan Novak; Lucy Porter; Jess Robinson; Katy Wix; Katy Brand; Omid Djalili; Phil Cornwell; Lucy Montgomery; Mark Perry; Ben Willbond
- Music by: Richie Webb; Matt Katz
- Country of origin: United Kingdom
- No. of episodes: 8

Production
- Running time: 30 minutes (including adverts)
- Production company: ITV Productions

Original release
- Network: ITV
- Release: 6 April – 15 June 2008

Headcases is a British satirical animation show based on current affairs. It employed the same satirical style as Spitting Image, 2DTV and Bo' Selecta!, but using 3D animation created by UK Visual Effects and animation house Red Vision.

The programme's only series began on 6 April 2008, with weekly episodes until 11 May 2008, airing on Sundays at 10 pm. A seventh episode was televised on Friday, 30 May at 10:30 pm, and an eighth on Sunday, 15 June at 10 pm. The show included celebrities, politicians and members of the British royal family in their animated form, taking a role in sketches including scenarios from their own topical issues.

The show's name comes from the fact that all the subjects' caricatured faces are out of scale with the rest of their bodies.

== Characters ==
Lampooning people in the public eye, the impressionists got the chance to caricature politicians, royals and celebrities alike. These included Prime Minister Gordon Brown, portrayed as an out of touch, weak, very austere Scrooge like Victorian and has a dark, miserable old character. His Chancellor, Alistair Darling, is depicted as a panicky cry baby who says, "We're doomed, doomed, doomed" while jumping around the room. There were also the forgetful Home Secretary Jacqui Smith, the vicious creature David Miliband and Tony Blair who, under the guise of Brown's adviser Ed Balls, tricks Gordon for money.

The Conservative Party's leader David Cameron was portrayed as insisting he is an ordinary man of the people for a press conference, before reverting into a volatile, mean spirited, snobbish public schoolboy behind closed doors. He regularly beats his Shadow Chancellor and manservant George Osborne, forcing him to do various unpleasant things, i.e. lick dog muck off his shoes (a reference to "old Etonian" fagging).

Shadow Foreign Secretary William Hague is portrayed as an oafish, bitter alcoholic Yorkshireman (referencing his past claims of having drunk "14 pints a day" as a teenager) and the then newly elected Mayor of London Boris Johnson portrayed as half-man and half dog, so when he tries to talk about issues, he instead does acts of canine behaviour e.g. chasing his tail and licking his genitals.

Liberal Democrat, leader Nick Clegg is portrayed as a desperate leader ready to use anything (such as offers at Pizza Hut suggested by his party) as an excuse for the Lib Dems' 'drive for change' influencing day to day Britain.

The Royal Family are set up in the same style as they were on Spitting Image; the reasonably sane but a senile Queen, the Duke of Edinburgh "and his dog (Poochwater)" who do everything that they can to stop Prince William from marrying "commoner" Catherine Middleton (he calls her Kate Middle class) but never succeed, and Prince William and Prince Harry who try to act as "normal blokes", but ultimately fail: in one sketch they attempt to order pizza, only to ask for caviar toppings.

There were other international politicians that Headcases satirised, like President George W. Bush, Bill Clinton and his wife, Hillary, Condoleezza Rice, incompetent farmer Robert Mugabe, strong but dark character (then) former President of Russia, Vladimir Putin, and his successor Dmitry Medvedev, who was portrayed as a ventriloquist's dummy, the sex mad medallion man, Nicolas Sarkozy as a flirty disco dancer who sings in French about international success and President of Iran Mahmoud Ahmadinejad who is portrayed as a Borat like character who lists reasons why his country should have nuclear technology (including destroying the entire Middle East and most of Central Asia so Iran can move closer to Europe to compete in Euro 2012) calling his adversaries racists.

Celebrities impersonated include the populist and selfish former editor of the Daily Mirror newspaper Piers Morgan, who gets a heavy object dropped on him each time; Victoria Beckham, a big headed loudmouth with a speech disorder and her dumb husband David, who is considerably shorter, going about their days working in America; Steven Spielberg; a transsexual version of Madonna; Morgan Freeman; large breasted model Jordan and child minded Peter Andre; old and senile action stars Harrison Ford, Sylvester Stallone and Bruce Willis, styled as "The (Geriatric) Action Heroes", who fight their nemesis, money grabbing, snake haired old people hater Heather Mills; unintelligent Brad Pitt and his twisted wife Angelina Jolie, who keeps adopting children and imprisoning them to a factory making hair extensions to rival the golden locks of Jennifer Aniston, veteran newsreader Trevor McDonald; inappropriate uses for Russell Brand (e.g. as a toilet brush); Fabio Capello struggling to learn English leaving everyone confused at what he means when he speaks; far too similar footballers Steven Gerrard and Frank Lampard, whose attempts to work together for England are portrayed as Laurel and Hardy style slapstick comedy; angry, loud mouthed Jeremy Clarkson making ill-informed judgements; Richard Hammond who was left drowning when global warming hit the 2050 episode of Top Gear; sleepy, drunk and drug addled Pete Doherty and Amy Winehouse; complainers Bono and Bob Geldof; coin operated Jonathan Ross; bachelor George Clooney; Sebastian Coe presenting updates for the 2012 Olympics; Mohamed Al-Fayed and his conspiracy theories involving Fiat Unos; alien Tom Cruise and his robot wife Katie, and common chavs Helen Mirren and Judi Dench, who bully Kate Winslet because they are Dames and she is not.

== Voice artists ==
- Rory Bremner
- Jon Culshaw
- Lewis MacLeod
- Kayvan Novak
- Daniel Maier
- Lucy Porter
- Jess Robinson
- Shelley Longworth
- Katy Wix
- Katy Brand
- Omid Djalili
- Phil Cornwell
- Lucy Montgomery
- Mark Perry
- Tom Hollander
- Andrew Lawrence
- Ben Willbond

== Writers ==
- Henry Naylor
- Kevin Day
- Mark Evans
- Lucy Porter
- Carl Carter
- Tony Cooke
- Simon Dean
- Richie Webb
- Marc Blakewill & James Harris

== Reception ==
Sam Wollaston from The Guardian gave the show a mixed review, saying that the writing was good, but the animation was "soulless" and the Daily Star simply called it "Hilarious". The show's debut opened with four million viewers, having the highest viewers of any programme for the first half of the show. However, the second half of the show was beaten by the news on BBC One. The second episode also attracted 4 million viewers.

Peter Fluck was critical of the series. His assessment was decidedly lukewarm: the CGI puppets "look pretty dead", it might not be rude enough, and, if he were younger, he would bypass television and broadcast on YouTube instead. However, he was encouraged by the likes of Rory Bremner among the impersonators.

== DVD release ==
On 15 June 2008, ITV announced that the only series would be available on DVD, which was released on 7 July.

== See also ==
- Spitting Image
- 2DTV
- Newzoids
