= The Blagger's Guide =

The Blagger's Guide is a British series of comical documentaries on specific music genres, originally broadcast on BBC Radio 2. Not all the information presented in the programme are facts. Some items have been exaggerated for comic effect. The series works on a monologue style, with clips of music inserted for illustrational purposes.

It is presented as a spoof documentary and therefore there is no laugh track. The series originally ran from 20 August 2005 – 24 April 2009. The 2012 series looked at the 2012 Olympics and in late 2012 there followed specials on The Beatles and James Bond.

The first two series focused on rock and pop music, and the third featured classical music. A live jazz special was recorded in 2010. Doctor Who special was recorded in 2013. Eurovision special was recorded in 2014.

The series is narrated by David Quantick, who co-wrote the series with Simon Poole. It also featured Lewis MacLeod and Kate O'Sullivan.
