= The Skewer =

Satirical radio comedy series

- Genre: Topical/Sketch comedy
- Running time: 15/30 minutes
- Country of origin: United Kingdom
- Home station: BBC Radio 4
- Produced by: Jon Holmes
- Original release: 8 January 2020

The Skewer is a topical radio programme broadcast on BBC Radio 4 and as a podcast on BBC Sounds. Created and produced by Jon Holmes, the 15 or 30 minute episodes are a sound collage which combine topical soundbites with excerpts from popular culture, historical quotations and songs, often in unsettling or surreal ways.

The programme is created using Avid Pro Tools and is designed to be heard through headphones, making use of binaural techniques. The series has an "open door" writing policy, with ideas and soundscapes being added just a few hours before broadcast.

Following a pilot episode on 4 April 2019 The Skewer has run for sixteen series since 8 January 2020.

== Reception ==
Miranda Sawyer in The Observer describes the programme as "Nightmare, or dream? Funny and strange, like all good things." and compared it to the work of Chris Morris.

"A surreal flow of snippets - news and views, music and memories - melded into a huge orchestral piece of compelling originality. The Skewer is satire at its cleverest, both biting and beautiful. If you could listen to a Francis Bacon painting, this is what it would sound like.” - Radio Academy Awards

=== Awards ===
- 2022 Radio Academy Award for Best Comedy
- 2022 NYF Awards Best Comedy
- 2022 NYF Awards Innovation
- 2022 NYF Sound Art
- 2022 British Comedy Guide Awards (finalist)
- 2022 BBC Audio & Drama Awards Best Comedy (finalist)
- 2022 Audio Production Award for Sound Design (Gold)
- 2022 Audio Production Award for Best Comedy Producer
- 2022 British Podcast Awards Best Comedy (nominee)
- 2021 New York Festival Award for Best Comedy
- 2021 New York Festival Award for Innovation
- 2021 New York Festival Award for Sound Art
- 2021 Radio Academy Award for Best Comedy
- 2021 Radio Academy Awards: Best New Show, Silver
- 2021 Radio Academy Award for Best New Show
- 2021 BBC Audio and Drama Awards for Best Comedy
- 2021 Audio Production Award for Best Comedy Producer
- 2021 British Podcast Award for Best Radio Podcast
- 2020 New York Festival Award for Sound Art
- 2020 British Podcast Award for Best Radio Podcast
- 2020 Audio Production Awards for Best Comedy Producer
- 2020 BBC Radio and Music Awards for Best Comedy
- 2020 Chortle Awards (nominee)
