= Listen Against =

- Genre: Comedy
- Running time: 30 mins
- Country of origin: United Kingdom
- Language(s): English
- Home station: BBC Radio 4
- Starring: Jon Holmes, Alice Arnold
- Created by: Jon Holmes
- Written by: Jon Holmes, Bill Dare, Joel Morris, Jason Hazeley, Carl Carter, Matt Charlton, Tony Cooke, Gareth Gwynn, Adam Buxton, Sam Bryant, Rachel Wheeley
- Produced by: Jon Holmes, Bill Dare, Sam Bryant
- Original release: 14 November 2007 – 24 November 2011
- No. of series: 4
- No. of episodes: 16
- Website: Listen Against

Listen Against is a BBC Radio 4 series. Its title is a play on the name of the BBC's Listen Again service. Presented by Jon Holmes and Alice Arnold, it takes a surreal look at the week's radio.

Created by Jon Holmes, it is co-written by Bill Dare, Joel Morris and Jason Hazeley, Carl Carter and Tony Cooke, Gareth Gwynn, Matt Charlton, and Adam Buxton.

== Air dates ==
=== Series 1 ===
- Episode 1 – 2007-11-14
- Episode 2 – 2007-11-21
- Episode 3 – 2007-11-28
- Episode 4 – 2007-12-05

=== Series 2 ===
- Episode 1 – 2008-11-18
- Episode 2 – 2008-11-25
- Episode 3 – 2008-12-02
- Episode 4 – 2008-12-09

=== Series 3 ===
- Episode 1 – 2010-09-07
- Episode 2 – 2010-09-14
- Episode 3 – 2010-09-21
- Episode 4 – 2010-09-28

=== Series 4 ===
- Episode 1 – 2011-11-03
- Episode 2 – 2011-11-10
- Episode 3 – 2011-11-17
- Episode 4 – 2011-11-24
