= Alice Arnold (broadcaster) =

British broadcaster and journalist (born 1962)

Alice K. Arnold
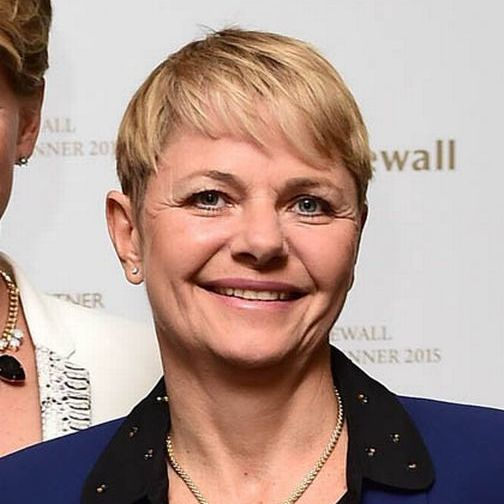
- Born: 1962 (age 63–64); Esher, Surrey, England
- Occupations: Broadcaster, journalist
- Spouse: Clare Balding (m. 2015)
- Alice Arnold's voice recorded November 2012

Alice Arnold (born 1962) is a British broadcaster and journalist. She was a newsreader and continuity announcer on BBC Radio 4 for more than twenty years until the end of December 2012. Since then she has worked for Bauer Media Audio UK hosting on Mellow Magic.

== Early life ==
She attended the independent Claremont Fan Court School in Esher, Surrey, where Michaela Strachan was three years below her.

After gaining a degree in politics from the University of Sussex, she trained as an actress at the Drama Studio in Ealing and was in the musical Evita for a year. She was a magistrate for ten years from the age of thirty in Tottenham.

== Career and public profile ==
Arnold joined the BBC Radio Drama Company in 1988. After meeting Peter Donaldson at a party in 1994, she joined Radio 4's presentation team in that year. In 2004 she became a newsreader, and regularly read the afternoon and evening news on Radio 4. For a brief period her early appearances as a newsreader were credited as "Eva Arnold", perhaps to keep her newsreading 'persona' separate from her identity as an actor. In 2005, she featured as a news presenter in BBC Two comedy Broken News. In June 2006, she was promoted to read the news on Radio 4's Today programme. From 2007 to 2011 she co-presented comedian Jon Holmes's show Listen Against, a parody of various programmes on Radio 4.

Arnold gained media attention in May 2012. While returning home, stuck in traffic, she observed an empty plastic bottle being thrown from the car ahead of her and threw it back into the vehicle through an open window. On Twitter, colleague and friend Corrie Corfield said Arnold deserved a damehood for her action.

In October 2012, Arnold announced the end of her eighteen years on Radio 4. Her final appearance was Saturday 29 December 2012. During 2013, she worked for the BBC in a training capacity and was involved in the Expert Women's Days where she coached potential female interviewees for Today. Arnold has suggested adopting a smile or frown while talking as appropriate to the context.

Since then she has written and narrated for The Daily Telegraph and The Guardian.

== Personal life ==
Arnold entered into a civil partnership in 2006 with the BBC presenter Clare Balding. They live in Chiswick, London. In April 2015, the couple officially married in a private ceremony.

Balding and Arnold are keen amateur golfers. Arnold wrote about the Scottish Muirfield golf club in The Guardian after it rejected proposals to admit female members: "Another argument put forward by the 'no' campaign is that not many women would want to join. Spot on. I do not want to join your snotty club. Golf is my hobby. I love it and I would like to play it where I feel welcome, not like some second-class citizen".
