= TV to Go =

British television series

TV to Go is a British television sketch show that aired on BBC One during 2000 and 2002. It starred Pauline McLynn, Mackenzie Crook, Hugh Dennis, Mina Anwar and Debra Stephenson.
