= At Home with the Snails =

British radio comedy series

- Genre: Black comedy
- Running time: 30 minutes
- Country of origin: United Kingdom
- Language: English
- Home station: BBC Radio 4
- Starring: Geoffrey Palmer; Angela Thorne; Gerard Foster; Miranda Hart; Debra Stephenson
- Written by: Gerard Foster
- Produced by: Jane Berthoud
- Original release: 26 June 2001 – 8 August 2002
- No. of series: 2
- No. of episodes: 8
- Audio format: Stereophonic sound
- Opening theme: Waltzinblack from The Gospel According to the Meninblack by The Stranglers

At Home with the Snails is a surrealist BBC Radio 4 comedy, written by Gerard Foster, about a dysfunctional British family. The cast includes Geoffrey Palmer as George Fisher, Angela Thorne as Beverly Fisher, Gerard Foster as Alex, Miranda Hart as Rose, and Debra Stephenson as Hosanna. It was produced by Jane Berthoud.

At Home with the Snails is often repeated on BBC Radio 4 Extra.

The story features Alex's obsession with snails, killing them, collecting them, having sexual desires for them and by season two, even attempting to turn into one. In the second season his mother and father (George and Beverly) decide to fake their own deaths and spy on their son in order to write a book about his descent into madness.

George is a pompous academic who puts his obscure, pretentious and pointless pontificating above all else including his family. He encourages Alex's snail obsession to get material for his books. Beverly, his sexually frustrated wife makes "nice things", such as a 20-foot-tall (6.1 m) "family mug tree". In one episode she develops racial dysphoria, and starts painting her face with boot polish, believing that she is a black person trapped in a white body. Their daughter Rose has her heart in the wrong place – jammed under her armpit. She runs a confectionery shop selling "chocolate excretions" and "jelly war babies".

== Episode list ==
Series	Episode	First broadcast
1	1	26 June 2001
1	2	3 July 2001
1	3	10 July 2001
1	4	17 July 2001
2	1	18 July 2002
2	2	25 July 2002
2	3	1 August 2002
2	4	8 August 2002
