= The Rise and Fall of Little Voice =

1992 play by Jim Cartwright

- Original window card for the National Theatre production, 1992
- Original language: English
- Written by: Jim Cartwright
- Genre: Comedy
- Setting: A town in northern England

Premiere
- Date: 16 June 1992
- Place: Cottesloe Theatre National Theatre; London

The Rise and Fall of Little Voice is a 1992 play written by English dramatist Jim Cartwright.

== Production history ==
Sam Mendes directed the first production at the Royal National Theatre that transferred to the Aldwych Theatre in London's West End.

The 1993 Steppenwolf Theatre Company production transferred to Broadway in April produced by James and Charlene Nederlander, Dennis Grimaldi, and Leonard Saloway.

A West End revival of the play ran in London from 8 October 2009 to 30 January 2010. Following the success of the play, Diana Vickers won the London Newcomer award at the Theatregoers' Choice Award and added "Sunlight" the closing ballad as a B-side for her debut single, "Once".

A London revival ran at The Union Theatre in Southwark from 2 to 26 June 2016. The production starred Charlotte Gorton as Mari, Carly Thomas as Little Voice and Ken Christianson as Ray Say. It was directed by Alastair Knights and was nominated for Offies.

In February 2004 Sarah Frankcom directed a performance at the Royal Exchange, Manchester with Denise Black as Mari Hoff, Emma Lowndes as Little Voice, Roy Barraclough as Mr Boo and Andrew Sheridan as Billy. Denise Black won a MEN Award for her performance.

In June 2012 at the Octagon Theatre, Bolton Sue Devaney, Max Beesley snr, Sally Bankes, Katie Elin-Salt and Matt Healey performed the play to standing ovations each night. The production, directed by Elizabeth Newman and designed by Ciaran Bagnall, received five star reviews and a place in the theatre's record books as an extra week of the run had to be scheduled due to its popularity. Octagon Theatre Bolton, The Rise and Fall of Little Voice.

A UK touring production opened 3 September 2012 at the Yvonne Arnaud Theatre in Guildford. Starring Beverley Callard as Mari, Joe McGann as Ray, Ray Quinn as Billy, Duggie Brown as Mr Boo and Jess Robinson as Little Voice and was directed by the play's writer Jim Cartwright. The production was due to end at the Lyceum Theatre, Sheffield in December 2012. After a short interval this production resumed at the end of January in Newcastle and ran until the end of June 2013, visiting Torquay, Portsmouth, Tunbridge Wells, Brighton, Buxton amongst numerous venues. Joe McGann left the tour part way through and was replaced by Philip Andrew (who had been the understudy for the role).

The Barn Theatre in Cirencester (UK) revived the play in June 2018. Described as 'A brilliant and brash revival' by The Stage* it included Sarah Louise Hughes in '...a spectacular debut*' straight from her training at Italia Conti as LV. The production was directed by Michael Strassen.

In 2022 a new tour embarked around the UK, directed by Bronagh Lagan. It starred Christina Bianco as Little Voice, Shobna Gulati as Mari, Ian Kelsey as Ray, Fiona Mulvaney as Sadie/US Marie, Akshay Gulati as Billy, William Ilkley as Mr Boo/US Ray, James Robert Moore as The Phone Man/US Billy & Mr Boo and Anna Hale as understudy LV/Sadie.

The play will return to the Dorfman Theatre at the Royal National Theatre, London in December 2026 in a revival directed by Robert Hastie, starring Francesca Mills as Little Voice, Jill Halfpenny as Marie and Paul Chuckle as Mr Boo, before touring the UK in February 2027.

The play has been presented internationally, in Kuala Lumpur, Bangkok and Sri Lanka, in January 2008, by the British Theatre Playhouse.

== Historical casting ==
Character	1992 West End cast	1994 Broadway cast	1998 Film cast	2009 West End revival cast	2022 National UK Tour
Laura Hoff / Little Voice	Jane Horrocks	Hynden Walch	Jane Horrocks	Diana Vickers	Christina Bianco
Mari Hoff	Alison Steadman	Rondi Reed	Brenda Blethyn	Lesley Sharp	Shobna Gulati
Ray Say	Pete Postlethwaite	George Innes	Michael Caine	Marc Warren	Ian Kelsey
Sadie	Annette Badland	Karen Vaccaro	Annette Badland	Rachel Lumberg	Fiona Mulvaney
Billy	Adrian Hood	Ian Barford	Ewan McGregor	James Cartwright	Akshay Gulati
Mr Boo	George Raistrick	John Christopher Jones	Jim Broadbent	Tony Haygarth	William Ilkley
The Phone Man	George Raistrick	John Christopher Jones	Philip Jackson	Tony Haygarth	James Robert Moore
U/S Little Voice					Anna Hale

== Film adaptation ==
The play was adapted for a 1998 film by Mark Herman, with Jane Horrocks reprising her original stage role. Brenda Blethyn assumed the role of Mari Hoff and was nominated for the Academy Award for Best Supporting Actress.

== TV adaptation ==
In 2021, a series adaptation of the play was announced to be in development with Miramax, who released the film, and Dominic Treadwell-Collins producing. Cartwright would be returning to write for the series.
