= Big Barn Farm =

- Genre: Children's television series Live-action animation Comedy
- Created by: The Foundation; Ian Carley; James Kearsley; Mark Harris
- Voices of: Ben Fairman; Elly Fairman; Shelley Longworth; Kate O'Sullivan; Carla Mendoncathe; Mike Winsor; Gemma Harvey
- Narrated by: Ben Fairman; Dave Lamb
- Opening theme: "Big Barn Farm"
- Ending theme: "Big Barn Farm" (Reprise)
- Country of origin: United Kingdom
- Original language: English
- No. of seasons: 2
- No. of episodes: 40

Production
- Executive producers: Kay Benbow; Sarah Colclough; Michael Carrington; Vanessa Hill; Beth Stevenson; Sander Schwartz
- Producer: Mary Robertson
- Running time: 14–15 minutes (series 1); 11 minutes (series 2)
- Production company: The Foundation

Original release
- Network: CBeebies
- Release: 3 March 2008 – 4 June 2010

Big Barn Farm is a British children's comedy television series following the lives of four young animals on a farm which uses a combination of live-action and animation. It was produced by The Foundation and commissioned by Michael Carrington for the BBC children's channel CBeebies. It was narrated by Ben Fairman in the first series and Dave Lamb in the second series.

== Setting ==
The programme is set on a farm and follows the adventures of four young animals: Petal the piglet, Gobo the goat, Dash the donkey and Digger the puppy, who are called the farmyard bunch. The storylines are told from the young animals' point of view and revolve around their emotions and the situations they find themselves in. In each adventure the farmyard bunch explore their friendships whilst discovering their roles on the farm with help from the other farm animals. Each episode constitutes an individual story, usually involving the main characters getting into some minor difficulty and pulling together to get out of that difficulty. There is no narrative thread to the episodes, each standing on its own without the need for prior understanding or any loose ends at the end.

The series aims to help children understand the importance of friendship, develop knowledge of the world around them and help develop problem solving skills.

Before the show airs, the CBeebies presenter may encourage the young viewers to sing along with the theme song, which is generally sung very fast and provides some basic information about each of the main characters. The closing song is similar, but longer and details all of the animal characters, including the minor ones.

== Characters ==
=== The farmyard bunch ===
- Dash (voiced by Ben Fairman) is a young male donkey. Dash is thoughtful, cautious and extremely kind but occasionally a bit stubborn (like most donkeys in real life). Dash is often wary of any new adventure and would prefer watching the others being brave rather than take part himself. But because of his kind nature, Dash will always end up joining in. Dash isn't as excitable as the others and always likes to think carefully about any new situation. As the tallest of the farmyard bunch, Dash can see over the top of things which can be very useful. His catchphrase is "Calm down, calm down."
- Gobo (voiced by Elly Fairman) is a young goat. Gobo is clever, very bouncy and eats a lot. Often too quickly which means Gobo burps a lot too. In fact, Gobo thinks about food most of the time and is always happy to nibble on anything. Gobo can be noisy and barges into situations when really Gobo should stop and think first. If there's a hay bale that needs climbing or a picnic to be investigated, Gobo will be first in line to give it a go. His catchphrase is "Go, go, Gobo!".
- Petal (voiced by Gemma Harvey) is a female piglet. Petal is a cheeky and daring young piglet who likes to think of herself as leader of the four friends. Petal is adventurous and brave and usually the first to go and investigate something new. Sometimes this gets her into trouble and at other times Petal sounds braver than Petal really feels. Petal's personality isn't girly, so she is just happy splashing in the mud. Her catchphrase is "Piglet Power!".
- Digger (voiced by Shelley Longworth) is a male Labrador Retriever puppy. He is the youngest of the four friends and always eager to prove himself. Digger is very cute, naive and willing to please. The puppy has boundless energy and will always be the first to volunteer for any new adventure, however, he isn't very bright and so doesn't come up with as many ideas as the others and sometimes takes a while to catch on to what's happening, but he is always eager to please and is never happier when playing with his friends. His catchphrase is "I can do that! I can do that!".

=== Minor characters ===
The main characters around the farm include:

- Mack the horse (voiced by Michael Winsor) is a horse, who is the tallest on the farm and is friends with the farmyard bunch.
- Madame the cow (voiced by Kate O'Sullivan) is a cow with a French accent, who is the most helpful to the farmyard bunch and adores the French language.
- Mrs Snuffles the pig (voiced by Kate O'Sullivan) is a female pig, who is Petal’s caring mother and would do anything to keep her daughters, her sons and her potato peelings.
- The Mrs Chickens (voiced by Kate O'Sullivan), they are hens, who are the ones who gossip all day it can just get the farm very annoyed but at same time they’re very busy with their chicks they give their feathers a real ache.
- Mrs Paws the cat (voiced by Carla Mendoncathe) is a female cat, who is the silent night walker of the farm who cares for her litter of kittens.
- The Duck girls (voiced by Kate O'Sullivan) are several female ducks who live at the farm pond. They are very vain and always fuss about their feathers.
- Old Pop is a male shepherd dog whose job is to keep everyone on the farm safe. Voiced by Michael Winsor and by Keith Wickham in the episode Old Pop's Got to Go only.
- Ewenice (voiced by Kate O'Sullivan) is a female sheep.
- Lester (voiced by Keith Wickham) is a very serious male cockerel who crows at dawn every day of the year.
- There is also a narrator, done by Ben Fairman in season 1 and then taken over by Dave Lamb in season 2.

There are also several human characters who feature in the programme, but doesn't speak, the farmer (played by Chris Noel), the farmer's wife (played by Laura Wyles), the farmer's son (played by Reef Matthews), and the farmer's daughter (played by Katie Parks).

== Production ==
Big Barn Farm announced alongside Mister Maker (then-named Mister Make It) in April 2007 as a double-commission from RDF Media by CBeebies creative director Michael Carrington.

The series was created and produced by The Foundation, which is part of the RDF Media group, the programme combines footage of real animals with animation. The visual effects were created by Ian Carley, at iCarley Media, and James Kearsley, at JK Studios, using 450 individual shots of talking animals. The Executive Producer for Cbeebies was Sarah Colclough.

The set was created around a flint stable block and a barn which were not part of a real working farm. The animals lived on set or nearby during filming.

The production filmed at Stede Court Estate near Maidstone in Kent.

== Episodes ==
#	Title	Animal Songs	Airdate	Overview
Series 1: 2008
1	You Can't Teach New Dogs Old Tricks	Madame	3 March 2008	Digger the Puppy steps into Old Pop the Sheep Dog's shoes for the day.
2	Lester Loses his Voice	Lester	4 March 2008	Lester the cockerel loses his voice. The farmyard bunch come up with a series of hilarious ideas to help him get it back.
3	The Grass is Always Greener	Mrs. Snuffles	5 March 2008	Gobo the goat is bored with the grass in his field. Dash the Donkey, Petal the Piglet and Digger the Puppy try to help him find tastier, juicier grass, but, as usual, things don't turn out quite as expected.
4	Keeping Quiet	Old Pop	6 March 2008	The farmyard bunch have to be quiet to let the kittens sleep, but being quiet is very difficult. They find kitten named Mrs. Paws on the tractor and call for help.
5	Petal and Gobo Fall Out	Madame	7 March 2008	After hearing Petal the piglet and Gobo the goat arguing, Dash the donkey and Digger the puppy must find a way to get them to be friends again.
6	To Catch a Thief	Lester	10 March 2008	The farmyard bunch have to find who has stole Digger the puppy's sticks, squeaky toys and blanket.
7	The Important Visitors	Madame	11 March 2008	The farm yard is tided for important visitors.
8	Greedy Goat	Lester	12 March 2008	Gobo the goat is sure that the farmer has missed feeding time and tries to find a tasty, satisfying snack.
9	Lester the Leader	Madame	13 March 2008	Lester the rooster decides that it is his job to be leader of the farm, but Mrs Snuffles the pig challenges him to the job.
10	Driving Miss Petal	Madame	14 March 2008	Petal the piglet finds a toy tractor belonging to the farmer's son.
11	Best in Show	Madame	17 March 2008	The animals prepare for the agricultural show.
12	40 Winks	Mrs. Snuffles	18 March 2008	The farmyard bunch try to find a quiet place to sleep, so that they can stay up to see Old Pop the sheep dog return from the sheep dog trails.
13	Hot and Sticky Day	Madame	19 March 2008	The farmyard bunch try to keep cool on a hot and sticky day.
14	Digger's Got to Go	Old Pop	20 March 2008	Digger the puppy hears the farmer say 'Digger's got to go' and the farmyard bunch wonder who on the farm will leave.
15	Recycling Proficiency Test	Madame	21 March 2008	The farmyard bunch discover a bear hidden in a pile of junk.
16	Hide and Seek	Madame	24 March 2008	The farmyard bunch play a game of hide and seek.
17	Going Camping	Madame	25 March 2008	Gobo the goat discovers a camp site in the farmers field and they think the tent is a monster.
18	Touch the Sky	Madame	26 March 2008	Gobo the goat finds a piece of cloud and the farmyard bunch wonder if the sky is falling down
19	What's Up Ducks?	Lester	27 March 2008	The duckies try to find a new home after they see a monster in their pond.
20	Who's Afraid of the Windy Wolf?	Madame	28 March 2008	On a windy day on the farm, the farmyard bunch think there is a wolf on the farm and build houses like the three little pigs.
Series 2: 2010
1 (21)	Summer Fete	Lester	19 April 2010	The local school are holding their summer fete at Big Barn Farm. The farmyard bunch ruin the stalls whilst trying to stop Gobo the goat eating a cake.
2 (22)	What's That Smell?	Old Pop	20 April 2010	There is a strange smell on Big Barn Farm. Gobo the goat, Petal the piglet and Dash the donkey soon realize it is Digger the puppy who needs a bath.
3 (23)	Great Eggspectations	Lester and Mrs. Snuffles	21 April 2010	The farmyard bunch find what they think is a dinosaur egg and try to hatch it.
4 (24)	Pink Play Pen	Old Pop	22 April 2010	Petal the piglet is unhappy that she is the only member of the farmyard bunch who doesn't have her own home and tries to find a new one.
5 (25)	Hide a Donkey	Mack	23 April 2010	The animals try to hide Dash the donkey when the vet comes to visit.
6 (26)	Gobo's Imaginary Friend	Lester	26 April 2010	A new goat named Oscar the goat causes trouble at Big Barn Farm.
7 (27)	Hidden Piglet	Mack	27 April 2010	All of the piglets are hiding in Big Barn Farm.
8 (28)	Gobo Gets Hiccups	Lester	28 April 2010	Gobo the goat gets the nasty case of the hiccups.
9 (29)	Giant Sunflower Seeds	Madame	29 April 2010	The farmyard bunch planted a sunflower seed.
10 (30)	Oink Factor	Mrs. Snuffles	30 April 2010	Petal the piglet thinks Petal has the oink factor.
11 (31)	Vegetable Thief	Old Pop	3 May 2010	Someone's been taking all of the vegetables from the vegetable patch.
12 (32)	Dash's Birthday Surprise	Old Pop	4 May 2010	The farmyard bunch planned a birthday party for Dash the donkey.
13 (33)	Quiz Wizard	Mack	5 May 2010	Mack the horse's friend Wizard the owl comes to visit and the farmyard bunch try to beat him at a quiz.
14 (34)	Runaway Rubbish	Lester	6 May 2010	The farmyard bunch try to play football but end up chasing rubbish instead.
15 (35)	Butter Fingers	Mack	7 May 2010	The farmyard bunch decide to save some of Madame the cow's milk and roll a milk churn around the farm.
16 (36)	Adventures of Petal	Mack	31 May 2010	Petal the piglet decides to go for an adventure on her own.
17 (37)	Brave Star	Mrs. Snuffles	1 June 2010	Petal the piglet and Gobo the goat compete to see who is the bravest animal on the farm.
18 (38)	Pampered Pooch	Mrs. Snuffles	2 June 2010	A new dog named Trixibelle visits the farm but the farmyard bunch's games are too messy for her.
19 (39)	Baby Sitters	Mack	3 June 2010	The farmyard bunch try babysitting.
20 (40)	Pigs Might Fly	Old Pop	4 June 2010	Petal the piglet decides Petal wants to be the first pig to fly, but dogs, goats and donkeys can have to wait for another day.

== Home media ==
A DVD of Big Barn Farm, titled "Welcome to Big Barn Farm" was released on 17 November 2008.

== Academic analysis ==
Professor Steven Fielding of the University of Nottingham analyses the political themes of the episode "Lester the Leader" in his 2014 work A State of Play, which examines how people's views on politics are constructed by fictional representations of politics.
