= Kevin Connelly =

British comedian

- Born: Middlesbrough, England
- Notable work: Dead Ringers

Comedy career
- Years active: 1986 – present
- Medium: impressionist

Kevin Connelly is an impressionist, comedian, and after dinner speaker who is probably best known for his role on the popular BBC radio and television programme Dead Ringers.

Connelly was born in Middlesbrough, England and was educated at St Mary's Roman Catholic College in Middlesbrough, where he would mimic his fellow students and teachers. Later while working in the Cleveland Tontine restaurant business, he would entertain his customers with unrehearsed cameo pieces. This led directly to engagements as an after-dinner speaker.

Connelly lives in North Yorkshire, where he spends much of his time travelling to London to work at the BBC on Dead Ringers. The remainder of his time is spent delivering after-dinner speeches using his talent for impersonation, principally of sports personalities.

== Appearances ==
- Dead Ringers - BBC 2002
- The Impressionable Jon Culshaw - ITV 2004
- Today with Des and Mel
- BBC Sports Review of the Year
- Des O'Connors World Cup Party
- The Full Motty - BBC 1998
- We're On Our Way To Wembley
- The Sports Show
- It's Just Not Cricket, With Rory Bremner
- Saint & Greavsie
- The Pavilion End
- Doubletake

== Notable impressions ==
- David Dimbleby
- Mark Lawson
- Andrew Marr
- Andrew Neil
