= Debra Stephenson =

English actress, comedian and impressionist (born 1972)

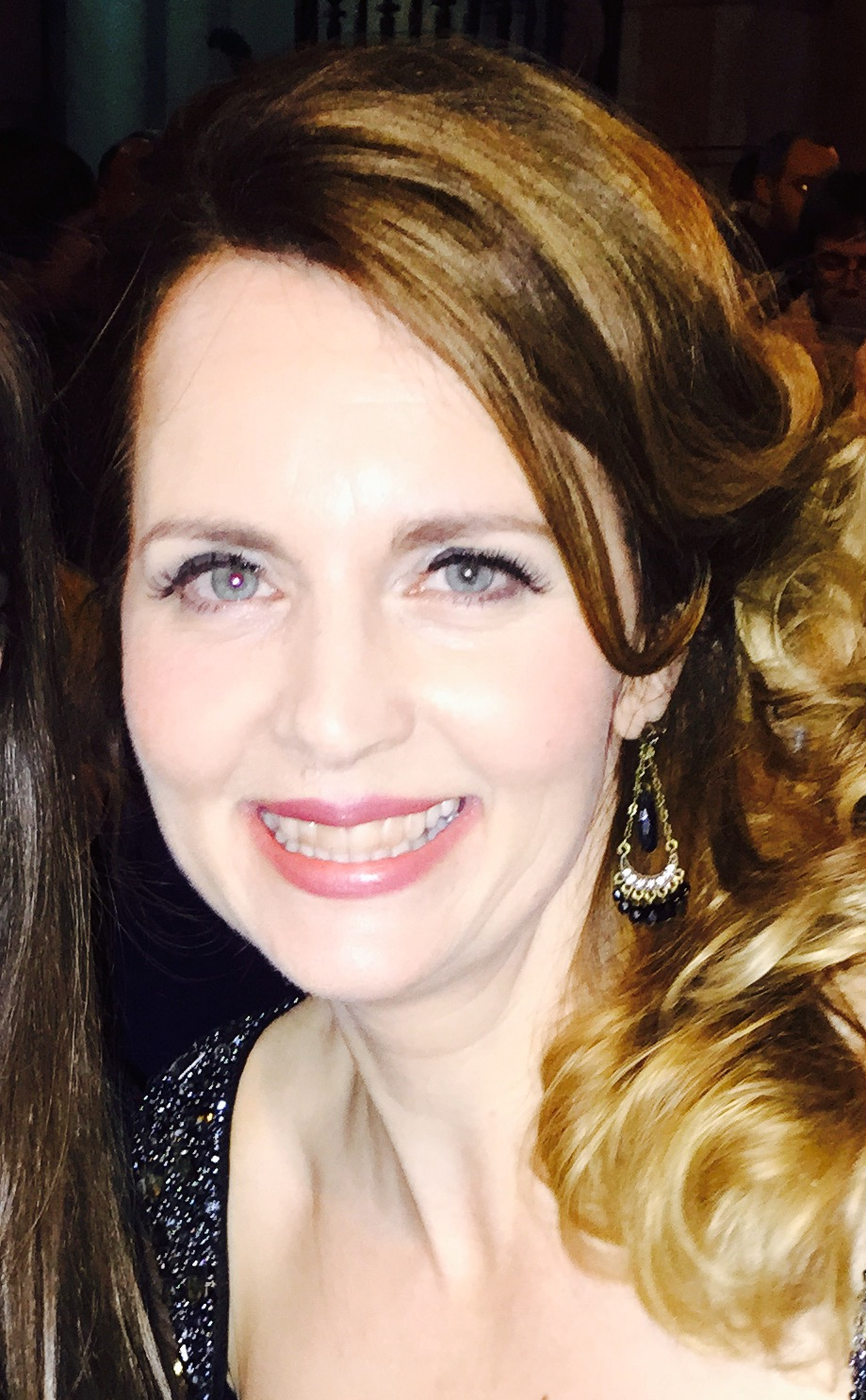
- Stephenson in 2015
- Born: Deborah Lee Stephenson; 4 June 1972 (age 54); Hull, Yorkshire, England
- Occupations: Actress; comedian; impressionist; singer
- Years active: 1989–present
- Notable work: Playing the Field; Bad Girls; Coronation Street; The Impressions Show; Newzoids; Holby City; Spitting Image
- Spouse: James Duffield (m. 1999)
- Children: 2

Deborah Lee Duffield (née Stephenson; born 4 June 1972), known professionally as Debra Stephenson, is an English actress, comedian, impressionist and singer, best known for her roles as Diane Powell in Playing the Field (1999–2000), Shell Dockley in Bad Girls (1999–2001, 2003) and as Frankie Baldwin in Coronation Street (2004–2006).

Between 2009 and 2011, she co-starred with Jon Culshaw in The Impressions Show, a comedy sketch show with impressions of top celebrities. Stephenson has voiced a number of characters for sketch shows such as Dead Ringers (2014–present) and Newzoids (2015–2016). She was also a regular team captain on the panel show The Imitation Game (2018) and appeared in the medical soap opera Doctors (2019).

== Early life ==
Deborah Lee Stephenson was born on 4 June 1972 in Hull, Yorkshire, as an only child. Her parents live in the East Riding of Yorkshire. Stephenson attended South Hunsley School in Melton, East Riding of Yorkshire, from the age of 11, and during these years she appeared in a number of national television talent shows doing impressions. In 1996, Stephenson graduated in drama from the Manchester Metropolitan School of Theatre.

== Career ==
At the age of 14, Stephenson appeared on BBC TV's Opportunity Knocks, winning her way through to the All-Winners' Final, broadcast live from the London Palladium. Around the same time she appeared on Blue Peter doing impressions.

She would later appear in other CBBC programmes such as The Friday Zone (in which she was a regular presenter) and was a backing singer on Chris Jarvis's 1997 charity single "Glasses".

In 1995 she sang vocals on musician and writer John Robb project Sensuround. She also sang in rave band Rhythm Quest, touring rave venues.

After graduating as an actor from The Manchester Metropolitan University, Stephenson was cast in various television roles, first appearing in ITV drama Reckless, starring Francesca Annis and Robson Green. In 1998 (for three series) she became one of the main characters in Kay Mellor's comedy drama about women's football, Playing the Field. Stephenson also appeared in the last two episodes of ITV's adaptation of Catherine Cookson's A Dinner of Herbs, in which she played the adult Kate Roystan, who fell in love with the son of the woman who murdered her grandfather.

In 1999, Stephenson played the prominent role of Shell Dockley in the ITV prison drama Bad Girls. Her performance as the psychotic Dockley earned her consecutive nominations for Best Actress at the National Television Awards in 1999 and 2000. After three years playing one of the show's most popular characters, Stephenson left in 2001, the same year she appeared on numerous TV light entertainment shows including as The Frank Skinner Show, The Alan Titchmarsh Show, The Sharon Osbourne Show, Today with Des and Mel, as well as taking part in Lily Savage's Blankety Blank; She returned to Bad Girls for four episodes of the fifth series in 2003.

As well as doing stand-up comedy at venues including London's Comedy Store and The 100 Club Stephenson has played several roles as a comic actress on radio and television. These include Hosanna in the BBC Radio 4 comedy At Home with the Snails (2002), and BBC1 sketch show TV to Go in 2000 with Hugh Dennis, Martin Freeman, Mckenzie Crook and Pauline McLynn. Stephenson was also part of The Friday Night Project, interviewing the public and going undercover with disguises such as 'Debbo' and 'Sister Mary'.

From June 2004 to December 2006, Stephenson starred in British soap opera Coronation Street playing Frankie Baldwin. She received nominations for "Best Newcomer" at various TV and soap awards shows. On 14 May 2006, producers announced that Stephenson would be leaving the soap at the end of that year. Her final scenes aired on 31 December 2006.

In 2005, Stephenson took part in Comic Relief Does Fame Academy, a singing competition involving celebrities, to raise money for charity, and finished fifth. Among her performances was a rendition of "Cry Me a River" which was called "blemishless". Her participation on the show led to a recording contract and she released her debut album, In The Sunshine including cover versions of the songs she sang on the show.

Stephenson was a reporter for GMTV throughout 2007 as part of The Richard Arnold Show. Stephenson appeared on Lorraine weekly, presenting her 10-week bikini diet plan. This involved demonstrating recipes in the studio kitchen.

Stephenson appeared on Channel Virgin 1's immersive style documentary The Prisoner:X in December 2008. Here she was locked up for four days in Santa Rita Jail, a high security prison in California. She was processed, wore the uniform, met different inmates, spent a night in segregation and was treated as though she was an actual prisoner doing time in that prison. Through the immersive style, Stephenson experienced the different kind of aspects of life as an inmate in a women's correctional facility.

Stephenson has performed in many pantomimes. Roles have included Aladdin, Peter Pan and Jack (Jack and the Beanstalk) at venues including the Regent Theatre in Ipswich, Nottingham Theatre Royal, Bournemouth Pavilion Theatre and Poole Lighthouse.

The Impressions Show with Culshaw and Stephenson, led by Stephenson and Jon Culshaw, began recording in August 2009. Eight episodes were commissioned by the BBC; the first aired on Saturday 31 October 2009. The show was recommissioned for a second series in 2010 and then again for a third series of six episodes which started on 26 October 2011. As of October 2011, only the first series has currently been released on to DVD.

In March 2010, Stephenson took part in Let's Dance for Sport Relief and reached the final after a rendition of Michael Jackson's "Smooth Criminal". The judges chose to put her through to the final as she had received some of the highest viewer votes. The final was live on 13 March and she performed the same routine.

She was also a contestant on the 2011 Strictly Come Dancing Christmas special. She danced the American Smooth with partner Ian Waite.

Stephenson was a guest for four episodes as Naomi Scotcher in Waterloo Road. In October 2012, Stephenson played the television cook, Fanny Cradock in Fanny and Friends on More4.

In 2015 she appeared as mentor alongside Ray Quinn in ITV's talent show Get Your Act Together. Since 2015, she has voiced a number of characters in the ITV puppet sketch show Newzoids alongside Jon Culshaw. A second series aired in 2016.

Stephenson has appeared in guest roles on series including Midsomer Murders, Spooks and Where the Heart Is, as well as Doctors and Holby City. She also appeared in the one-off BBC comedy drama Young Hyacinth. Between 2017 and 2018, Stephenson appeared alongside Diana Vickers in the stage musical Son of a Preacher Man, in a tour of UK number one theatres.

Stephenson has for several years toured UK theatres with her own one woman cabaret show "Night of 100 Voices". She has also performed on board cruise ships such as P&O Aurora and Ventura and also took part in the TV cook show Battlechefs, hosted by Marco Pierre White.

In 2018, Stephenson was a regular team captain opposite Rory Bremner on ITV1 panel show The Imitation Game, hosted by Alexander Armstrong.

In September 2019, she appeared as Jane in Midlife Cowboy, a new musical at the Pleasance Theatre written by Tony Hawks. She was the voice of Melania Trump as well as Lady Margaret in the animated movie The Queen's Corgi, released in cinemas in 2019. Stephenson also voices several characters in the ongoing CBBC animated series Scream Street. In December 2020, Stephenson voiced several characters on Spitting Image for the Britbox streaming service. She also voiced deepfake version of the Queen's Alternative Christmas Message on Christmas Day on Channel 4.

== Personal life ==
Stephenson married builder James Duffield in June 1999, and they have two children; Max, born in November 2002 and Zoe, born in January 2007.

== Filmography ==
Television

Title	Year	Role	Notes
1989	Spitting Image	Unnamed role	Episodes 7.1 & 7.2
1997	Reckless	Michelle	Miniseries; 5 episodes
1997	Cone Zone	Coriander	6 episodes
1998	ChuckleVision	Grand Duches Olga	Episode 10.8 – "Stop That Stamp"
1998	Midsomer Murders	Kitty Carmichael	Episode 1.4 – "Death of a Hollow Man"
1999–2001, 2003	Bad Girls	Shell Dockley	Series 1–3 – 31 episodes (main role); Series 5 – 4 episodes (recurring role); TV Quick Award for Best Actress (2001); Nominated: National Television Award for Most Popular Actress (2000); Nominated: National Television Award for Most Popular Actress (2001)
1999	People Like Us	Unnamed role	Episode 1.4 – "The Police Officer"
1999–2000	Playing the Field	Diane Powell	Seasons 1–3; 16 episodes
2000	A Dinner of Herbs	Kate Roystan	Miniseries; 3 episodes
2001	Sam's Game	Sarah	Episode 1.1 – "Bed"
2002	Dick Whittington	Alice Fitzwarren	Television film
2002	Spooks	Claire Osborne	Episode 1.2 – "Looking After Our Own"
2002	TV to Go	Various roles	Episode 2.1
2004	Mad About Alice	Kate	6 episodes
2004	The Last Detective	Angela Barnwell	Episode 2.4 – "Dangerous and the Lonely Hearts"
2004	Where the Heart Is	Charlotte Balderstone	Episode 8.5 – "Little Boy Blue"
2004–2006	Coronation Street	Frankie Baldwin	340 episodes, Series regular
2005	Comic Relief Does Fame Academy	Contestant	
2009–2011	The Impressions Show with Culshaw and Stephenson	Various roles	3 series; 21 episodes
2011	Waterloo Road	Naomi Scotcher	4 episodes
2010	Let's Dance for Sport Relief	Contestant	
2012	Coming Up	Emma Sullivan	Episode 7.5 – "Postcode Lottery"
2012	Rocket's Island	Sarah	3 episodes
2012	Fanny and Friends	Fanny Cradock	
2014–2015	My Mad Fat Diary	Chloe's Mum	4 episodes
2015	Get Your Act Together	Celebrity mentor	2 episodes
2015–2016	Newzoids	Various voices	2 series; 12 episodes
2016	Coastal Walks with My Dog	Co-presenter	1 episode
2016	Battlechefs	Contestant	
2016	Zig and Zag	Nellie	26 episodes
2016	Young Hyacinth	Dulcie Cooper-Smith	1 episode
2017	Doctors	Becca Mowberry	Episode: "Legacy"
2017	Holby City	Harriet Jacobson	2 episodes
2018	The Imitation Game	Herself, impressionist	8 episodes
2019	Doctors	Charlotte Hill	12 episodes
2019	The Queen's Corgi	Lady Margaret	
2020	Give Them Wings	Ethel Hogg	
2020–2021	Spitting Image	Queen Elizabeth II	
2020	Alternative Queen's Speech	Queen Elizabeth II	Impression of the Queen via deepfake
2021	Holby City	Jeni Sinclair	Series regular
2023	Mrs. Brown's Boys	Anita Luttrell	Guest role
2026	Father Brown	Katherine Vale	Season 13, Episode 9: "The Power of Suggestion"

Additional credits

- Coronation Street: Pantomime (2005) – Cinderella
- The Prisoner:X (2008) – Herself, contestant
- Davina McCall: A Comedy Roast (2010) – Davina McCall
- Comic Relief: The Million Pound Drop (2011) – Davina McCall
- Tipping Point: Lucky Stars (2013) – Herself, contestant
- Big Star's Little Star (2016) – Herself, contestant
- Pointless Celebrities (2021) – Herself, contestant
- Sleeping Beauty (2025-26) - The Queen (Grand Theatre, Wolverhampton)
