= Mark Perry (impressionist) =

British impressionist

- Born: Phillip Perry
- Occupations: Impressionist, actor
- Years active: 1983–present
- Known for: Dead Ringers, 2DTV, Bleak Expectations
- Notable work: Impressions of David Dickinson, John Prescott, Robin Cook
- Awards: Sony Radio Award (2000); BAFTA (Double Take); Golden Rose of Montreux (2DTV)

Mark Perry (born Phillip Perry) is a British impressionist and his notable impressions include David Dickinson, John Prescott and Robin Cook. Perry is known for playing various public figures in Dead Ringers and 2DTV.

== Career ==
In 2007 he appeared in the radio comedy Bleak Expectations. He has won several awards, including a Sony Radio Award for Dead Ringers (2000), a BAFTA for Double Take and Golden Rose of Montreux for 2DTV. He can also be seen as an extra playing a Gallifreyan Guard in the 1983 Doctor Who story Arc of Infinity. He was recently heard as Gerry (temporary chairman of the board of directors of Borchester Land) in the BBC Radio 4 soap The Archers.

Perry is involved with the charities NCH and The Heritage Foundation.
