= 2DTV =

- 2DTV (title card)
- Created by: Giles Pilbrow; Georgia Pritchett
- Directed by: Tim Searle
- Starring: Jon Culshaw; Jan Ravens; Mark Perry; Lewis MacLeod; Kate O'Sullivan; Enn Reitel; Dave Lamb; Alistair McGowan (Pilot)
- Composers: Willie Dowling; Peter Baikie
- Country of origin: United Kingdom
- Original language: English
- No. of series: 5
- No. of episodes: 36

Production
- Producer: Giles Pilbrow
- Animators: Tim Fancourt; Joe Brumm; Steven Lenton
- Editor: Christopher Scott
- Running time: 10–30 mins

Original release
- Network: ITV
- Release: 27 March 2001 – 23 December 2004

2DTV is a British satirical animated television series which was co-created and produced by Giles Pilbrow for ITV. It premiered on ITV on 27 March 2001 and was nominated for the Rose d'Or Award in both 2002 and 2003.

The programme was considered the spiritual successor of Spitting Image, a 1980s series that also featured work by Pilbrow. The show's style also paid homage to the animation studio Hanna-Barbera. The voice cast included Jon Culshaw, Jan Ravens and Mark Perry. 2DTV ran for five series before being cancelled on 23 December 2004 due to falling viewing figures. It was succeeded in 2008 by the short-lived series Headcases.

== Background ==
2DTV employed the same satirical style as Spitting Image but used animation rather than puppets. The animation was produced using computer graphics, frequently with animators working up to the day of broadcast. The producer, Giles Pilbrow, was a veteran of Spitting Image, as were some of the show's voice artists.

The series was directed by Tim Searle. 2DTV was first broadcast on 14 October 2001, but an un-broadcast pilot episode was recorded nearly six months earlier. The pilot episode featured the resident newsreader played by Alistair McGowan, but the character was not carried over when the full seven-part first series was commissioned by ITV. Each episode in the first series lasted ten minutes.

A second seven-episode series began broadcasting on 27 April 2002, with each episode again lasting ten minutes. The series spawned its own official single in July 2002, "Shoot the Dog", performed by George Michael. The music video features an animated Michael, plus several other characters from 2DTV performing the song.

A commercial for the home media compilation The Best of 2DTV was banned by the Broadcast Advertising Clearance Centre in 2002. The commercial depicted George W. Bush taking one VHS out of its case and putting it in his toaster. Ofcom stated that advertisements for products cannot appear to be endorsed by someone without their permission – in this case, George W. Bush. The original advert was reworked into a sketch in which Bush writes a letter complaining about being portrayed as a moron by the media, then proceeding to "post" the letter in his toaster. The programme creators subsequently proposed another commercial, this time satirising Osama bin Laden, but they were informed that this would also be banned on the grounds that Bin Laden would have to give permission for his image to be used.

Another commercial satirised David Beckham compiling his list for Christmas, asking his wife; "how do you spell DVD?". A ban was later overturned on the grounds that the commercial was legitimate satire and the commercial was shown unedited. The programme's creators claimed that the controversy generated more interest in the show than the adverts could ever have done alone.

For the third series (premiered on 27 November 2002), each episode was extended to 20 minutes, including advertisements. After the third series, many of the original cast members, including Jon Culshaw, Jan Ravens and Mark Perry, decided to leave following an announcement that the fourth series (premiered on 7 March 2004) would be extended to 30 minutes per episode. New cast members Lewis MacLeod, Kate O'Sullivan and Enn Reitel took over, appearing alongside the only remaining original cast member, Dave Lamb. All four returned for the fifth series on 8 November 2004, but due to falling ratings, its broadcast was placed in the so-called graveyard slot, and the show was officially cancelled at the end of that year.

== Cast ==
=== Series 1–3 ===
- Jon Culshaw – providing impressions of Tony Blair, Jack Straw, William Hague, John Major, George W. Bush, George H. W. Bush, Prince Charles, Angus Deayton, Ian Hislop, Paul Merton, Gareth Gates, Chris Eubank, Rolf Harris, Trevor McDonald, George Michael, David Beckham, Michael Jackson, Johnny Vegas, Steve Irwin, Lawrence Llewelyn-Bowen, Uri Geller, Bill Gates, Liam Gallagher, Anthony McPartlin, Sven-Göran Eriksson, Roy Keane, Michael Owen, Alex Ferguson, Ozzy Osbourne, Guy Ritchie, Iain Duncan Smith, Richard Madeley, Phillip Schofield, Tim Henman
- Jan Ravens – providing impressions of Cherie Blair, Ann Widdecombe, Queen Elizabeth, Camilla Parker Bowles, Princess Anne, Fergie, Geri Halliwell, Victoria Beckham, Anne Robinson, Jordan, Carol "Smiley" Smillie, Jennifer Lopez, Madonna, Davina McCall, Kylie Minogue, Sharon Osbourne, Kelly Osbourne, Jade Goody, Kim Woodburn, Aggie MacKenzie, Nigella Lawson, the Queen Mother, Judy Finnigan
- Mark Perry – providing impressions of Gordon Brown, Robin Cook, Saddam Hussein, Spider-Man, Michael Howard, Michael Parkinson, Graham Norton

=== Series 4–5 ===
- Enn Reitel – providing impressions of Tony Blair, Jack Straw, John Prescott, Michael Jackson, Johnny Vegas, Anthony McPartlin, Jeremy Clarkson, Michael Howard, Will Young, Tom Cruise, Tim Henman, Justin Hawkins, Simon Cowell, Jack Osbourne, Phil Spencer, Gordon Ramsay, David Dimbleby, Peter Andre, Frank Skinner, Des Lynam, Robbie Williams, Gareth Gates, Lawrence Llewelyn-Bowen, Uri Geller, David Blunkett, Charles Kennedy, Dick Cheney, Arnold Schwarzenegger, Prince Philip, Prince Edward, Princes William and Harry, Osama bin Laden, Pope John Paul II, Wayne Rooney
- Kate O'Sullivan – providing impressions of Cherie Blair, Queen Elizabeth, Camilla Parker Bowles, Princess Anne, Geri Halliwell, Victoria Beckham, Anne Robinson, Jordan, Carol "Smiley" Smillie, Jennifer Lopez, Madonna, Davina McCall, Kylie Minogue, Sharon Osbourne, Kelly Osbourne, Kim Woodburn, Nigella Lawson, Aggie MacKenzie, Trinny Woodall, Susannah Constantine, Judy Finnigan, Steffi Graf, Sophie Ellis-Bextor, Judi Dench, Coleen McLoughlin
- Lewis MacLeod – providing impressions of Gordon Brown, Chris Eubank, Rolf Harris, George Michael, David Beckham, George W. Bush, Prince Charles, Trevor McDonald, Steve Irwin, Uri Geller, Bill Gates, Liam Gallagher, Sven-Göran Eriksson, Roy Keane, Michael Owen, Alex Ferguson, Ozzy Osbourne, Johnny Vaughan, Richard Madeley, Louis Walsh, Rio Ferdinand, Paul Scholes, David Seaman, Neil Armstrong, Robin Cook, Saddam Hussein, Declan Donnelly, Ronaldo, Phil Neville, Andre Agassi, Boris Johnson

=== All series ===
- Dave Lamb – providing impressions of John Prescott, David Blunkett, Stephen Byers, Michael Portillo, Charles Kennedy, Dick Cheney, Arnold Schwarzenegger, Prince Philip, Prince Edward, Princes William and Harry, Osama bin Laden, Pope John Paul II, Elton John, Graham Norton, Andrew Marr, Michael Palin, Declan Donnelly, Martin Keown, Ronaldo, Phil Neville, Tom Cruise
