= The Impressions Show with Culshaw and Stephenson =

British sketch comedy show (2009-2011)

- Series 3 title card
- Genre: Comedy; Satire
- Directed by: Angie de Chastelai Smith
- Starring: Jon Culshaw; Debra Stephenson
- Opening theme: "God Put a Smile upon Your Face" (series 1–2) "The Impressions Show theme" (series 3)
- Composers: Mark Ronson (series 1–2); Glenn Gregory (series 3); Keith Lowndes (series 3)
- Country of origin: United Kingdom
- No. of series: 3 + Christmas special in 2010
- No. of episodes: 21

Production
- Producer: Richard Webb
- Running time: 30 minutes

Original release
- Network: BBC One
- Release: 31 October 2009 – 21 December 2011

The Impressions Show (also known as The Impressions Show with Culshaw and Stephenson) is a British sketch comedy show starring impressionists Jon Culshaw and Debra Stephenson. A second series began broadcasting on 14 November 2010 and ended on 23 December 2010. A third series started on 26 October 2011 at 8.30pm on BBC One. The show was nominated for a National Television Award in the category of Comedy in 2011, but failed to make the top four.

== Characters ==
This is not the complete list but a list of the most common celebrities parodied in the show.

- The One Show – Culshaw as Adrian Chiles and Stephenson as Christine Bleakley. The duo usually open the show and state many bizarre and inhumane events of the week in the format of the real show. The scene usually ends with Adrian saying "But first this..." which opens up the other sketches. The scene is however repeated two or three times throughout the show. For series 3 Culshaw and Stephenson played Chris Evans and Alex Jones instead.
- Ross Kemp on Gangs – A sketch which begins with Ross Kemp describing a gang he is about to encounter. Unlike the real show, he is usually referring to groups of people with no aggressive tone whatsoever e.g. Brownies. He usually scarpers from the groups within thirty seconds of meeting them whilst saying "I could see it was about to kick off; so I got out of there!" However, he then returns to these innocent groups a few "days" later and they have the same impact once again.
- Sir Alan Sugar in the office – A look into the eventful goings on in the Sir Alan office but who will Sir Alan be firing this time? Sketches include the firing of Del Boy and Rodders in ep.1 and Mr. Bean in ep.5.
- Ray Mears' Survival Guide – A show featuring Ray Mears who intensely discovers and describes new foods he can eat whilst surviving in the jungle. He then shows two pieces of food which are similar although one is poisonous and one is not-he often confuses them and ends up eating the poisonous before the cameraman is able to warn him
- Autumnwatch – A parody of a show with the same name. The show features Stephenson as Kate Humble the regular presenter and a brand new one, the unlikely: Hugh Fearnley-Whittingstall who always seems to ruin Humble's perfect introduction and presentation of the show by killing and eating the animals being shown.
- Davina McCall and Claudia Winkleman – An impression of the female television presenters who regularly bump into each other on different occasions and embark in different activities which involves having a choice between two things to do. In the excitement of having a choice both of them pass out in a long series of heavy enthusiastic breathing.
- New Doctor Who auditions – Sketches in which different celebrities audition for the new role as Doctor Who, celebrities include Bruce Forsyth, Amy Winehouse, Nick Knowles, Philip Glenister as DCI Gene Hunt, Peaches Geldof, Michael Winner, Ricky Gervais and others.
- Michael McIntyre – A British stand-up comedian who is portrayed by Culshaw as a very quick talking and witty person who first appeared in his house being visited by a sound inspector after noticing there was a strange noise in his house which turned out to be his own voice. He appears for around ten seconds throughout the show in the format of Michael McIntyre's Comedy Roadshow but instead the backdrop reads "ME" and he drones on about different topics making a joke.
- Bad Jobs for Celebrities – This sketch features various celebrities taking the role of a profession which is the complete opposite of what they should like and plays to their personality e.g. Brian Blessed as a librarian, Kate Winslet as an air traffic controller, Noel Edmonds as a pizza delivery man or Lorraine Kelly as an assassin.
- Vernon & Tess' Summer Holiday – When Kay and Daly intend to have a peaceful holiday in Cleethorpes together they are rudely disrupted by Bruce Forsyth who insists on coming with and ruins everything for Vernon, whilst constantly calling him "Roland".
- Jonathan Ross: Reads the Great Speeches – A sketch where Culshaw portraying Ross reads the great speeches in front of a live audience and constantly interferes the words with events of his own life.
- Where does David Cameron go at Night? – A sketch with Culshaw portraying Cameron who is seen floating around the night sky and describing his activities which are normally in the vein of supernatural children's fairytales (e.g. the Bogeyman).
- The Minogues' House – A sketch in which Dannii and Kylie Minogue are paid a visit by their fictional plain, obese sister Daggy who insists on staying and demands a part on The X Factor and to share the same lifestyle as her siblings who try to politely refuse her.
- Ashes to... – A sketch which involves Ashes to Ashes character DCI Gene Hunt going to other TV shows in order to solve a crime, and leaving with a female character.
- Eamonn Holmes – A sketch which involves Eamonn Holmes' chat show going into an ad-break and the technical producer will come out from backstage and tell him what is happening in the next part of his show, only Eamonn usually ruins the show by eating something vital like the sofa or the table whilst mistaking them for a cake or a biscuit.
- Look it's Wayne and Coleen – A sketch about the apparent lives of Wayne and Coleen Rooney in the form of a reality TV show, only Wayne is Coleen's pet dog in the sketch and he often enjoys the park or meeting his friend Gary Neville (despite the fact that Gary gives him fleas) although he doesn't like going to the V-E-T.
- Antiques Roadshow – A sketch showing great and expensive finds on the antiques Roadshow however Fiona Bruce seems to be stealing any antique worth over £250. In episode 5 Bruce Forsyth also goes on the show but he wants an evaluation for himself!
- Don't Get Dom, Get Done – A parody of a show with the complete opposite name. The sketch centres Dominic Littlewood who confronts various business deals for ridiculous prices for instance his own business contract which was initially £100,000 which he lowered to £1 and a cheap pen.
- Noel Edmonds – Noel Edmonds speaks to the banker on Deal or No Deal.
- Simon Cowell – A look at Simon Cowell's life including the X Factor with Cheryl Cole and Britain's Got Talent with Amanda Holden.
- Anne Robinson – Anne Robinson teases on the weakest link and in episode 5 has a heated argument with Simon Cowell.
- Ant & Dec – Adventures of the 2 misfits in the celebrity jungle.
- Gordon Ramsay – Swears in different situations.
- Steven Gerrard – Initially responds to a post match interviewers question then answers a second question on world politics or offering his views on complex issues.
- Lady Gaga – Regularly seen traveling around shops in search of her latest outfit. She has already been seen in an appliance mart and a KFC, using whatever she can find to make something "unique".
- Bruno Tonioli – Turns into a "cheeky boy" when he does random acts of vandalism to people in the streets.
- Mastermind – Plays host to a range of unlikely celebrities, such as Ian Hislop, who rather than answering his questions goes on to rant about out-of-date political views and Derren Brown, who gains 45 points simply by mind reading.
- Derren Brown – The man himself does simple tricks, such as stealing the nose of a child, which is clearly his thumb
- The Top Gear presenters – Features Clarkson, May and Hammond, with Clarkson acting like a bit of a bully to the other two, mainly May.
- Watchdog – Features Anne Robinson, normally talking about issues such as the stranger behind the audience's sofa, frightening the viewers or talking about more bizarre things.
- Sophie by Jane Austen – 1814, London. Sophie Dahl can't cook (Well, boil or scramble an egg), so her Aunt Delia hires a new cooking tutor: Nigella, who invites her new friend, Hugh Fearnley-Whittingstall and Sophie falls for him quickly. But during one of Sophie's lessons, Nigella meets Reverend Ramsay.
- Film 2011 with Claudia Winkleman – Claudia Winkleman hosts Film 2011 giving her verdict on different films, and talking literally about it until she's out of breath.
- Masterchef – We take a look at what the Masterchef judges get up to when there preparing the tasks for the contestants.
- Miscast Movies – A sketch suggesting what a movie would be like if it starred different celebrities, for example, Basic Instinct starring Ann Widdecombe, Taxi Driver starring Boris Johnson, or Saturday Night Fever starring Pat Butcher
- Dragons Den – The adventures of Den Dragons Theo Paphitis and Hilary Devey.
- Mary Queen of Shops – The trips of Mary Queen of Shops visiting high street shops and criticising them for their appeal and then stealing their stock reclaiming everything is fine.
- Relocation, Relocation, Relocation – Kirstie Allsopp and Phil Spencer try to rehouse people who are in the witness protection program. He ruins each attempt by giving away the location.
- How to Look Good Naked – Gok Wan giving fashion advice to women who are uncomfortable with their appearance, but using it as an excuse to leer at them (implying that he's only pretending to be gay).
- DIY SOS – A clueless Nick Knowles being sent to a DIY store to ask for things like a long weight or rubber nails.
- Countryfile – Julia Bradbury gives a piece to camera changing tone halfway through mentioning she is being held against her will by veteran presenter John Craven, emphasizing this by writing cries for help or sheep on in fields.

== Episodes ==
=== Series 1 (2009) ===
No.	Title	Original release date	UK Viewers (millions)
1	"Series 1 Episode 1"	31 October 2009	4.59
Gene Hunt meets Jane Austen, Ross Kemp investigates the Famous Five, and Michael McIntyre sorts out a strange noise and what is Hugh Fearnley-Whittingstall up to these days?. Plus who is Alan Sugar pointing the finger at this time?
2	"Series 1 Episode 2"	14 November 2009	4.55
Viewers see a snapshot of Wayne and Coleen Rooney's home life, witness Gordon Brown rapping and learn the tragic story behind Simon Cowell. Ross Kemp infiltrates another notorious gang whilst Kylie and Dannii watch as their lesser-known sister Daggy hatches a plot to become famous.
3	"Series 1 Episode 3"	21 November 2009	3.60 (overnight)
The myriad characters this week include Tess Daly and Vernon Kay, who pick up an unexpected holiday hitch-hiker; Jonathan Ross, who delivers a great speech; and Fiona Bruce, who is up to her old tricks again on Antiques Roadshow. Nick Knowles also makes an appearance at the local hardware store and Lorraine Kelly debuts in "Bad Jobs for Celebrities". Kirstie and Phil try to relocate a man who gave evidence against a Russian Mafioso. Colleen takes Wayne to the vet. Ross Kemp meets morris dancers.
4	"Series 1 Episode 4"	28 November 2009	3.13 (overnight)
Amy Winehouse auditions for Doctor Who, Michael McIntyre makes his debut in Bad Jobs for Celebrities, and Tess Daly and Vernon Kay try to continue their holiday with an unwanted third party. Culshaw and Stephenson also turn their attentions to Davina McCall, Dominic Littlewood, Paris Hilton and Jonathan Ross. And DCI Gene Hunt crashes an episode of Poirot. Meanwhile, with the impressionists' assistance, Simon Cowell reads an unlikely bedtime story.
5	"Series 1 Episode 5"	5 December 2009	3.90 (overnight)
The impressions include Gordon Ramsay's version of Goldilocks and the three bears and Madonna's version of The Pied piper; Kate Winslet appearing in the Bad Jobs for Celebrities slot; Davina McCall and Claudia Winkleman having yet another dilemma; and Kirstie and Phil from Location, Location, Location getting themselves into a bit of a pickle. There's also a showdown between Simon Cowell and Anne Robinson; Ant & Dec trying to find their way in the jungle; and Hollywood stars Brad Pitt and Angelina Jolie are also parodied. Also Mr. Bean gets in a pickle with Sir Alan Sugar and celebrities keep auditioning for the role as the new Doctor Who including DCI Gene Hunt, Nick Knowles, Michael Winner and Bruce Forsyth.
6	"Series 1 Episode 6"	12 December 2009	3.30 (overnight)
Jon Culshaw and Debra Stephenson continue running the gamut of celebrity culture with their inimitable impressions. There's an audience with the Minogues, what's inside Simon Cowell's Warehouse, DCI Gene Hunt meets Robin Hood, and John Barrowman debuts in Bad Jobs for Celebrities. There's also Paris Hilton, The One Show, Top Gear and Ray Mears, plus Eamonn Holmes wreaks havoc on the Chelsea Flower Show. Also what's one man breeding on Celebrity Farm and the kidnapped Countryfile presenter tries to get away. Catherine Zeta-Jones also reads Beauty and the Beast
7	"Series 1 Episode 7"	24 December 2009	3.45 (overnight)
Jon Culshaw and Debra Stephenson bring viewers a compilation of the best moments from the series. Eamonn Holmes, Bruce Forsyth, Tess Daly and Vernon Kay receive a ribbing, as do Ross Kemp, Amy Winehouse, Michael McIntyre and David Cameron. Autumnwatch, Cheryl Cole, Wayne Rooney and The Apprentice also come in for the typical Culshaw and Stephenson treatment.
8	"Series 1 Episode 8"	8 January 2010	4.20 (overnight)
Viewers can enjoy a look back over the series highlights, which sees Jon Culshaw and Debra Stephenson impersonating favourites including Claudia Winkleman, Davina McCall, Michael McIntyre, Simon Cowell, Ricky Gervais, the Minogue sisters, Brian Blessed, Lorraine Kelly, Amanda Holden and Philip Glenister's Gene Hunt.

=== Series 2 (2010) ===
No.	Title	Directed by	Original release date
9	"Series 2 Episode 1"	Angie De Chastelai Smith	14 November 2010
New series of the Impressions Show starring John Culshaw and Debra Stephenson. With some old favourites from the previous series and some new impressions. This episode stars new characters Katie Price, who plans her wedding to Michael Winner, Bruno Tonioli becomes a very cheeky boy and Lady Gaga goes shopping. Also there are old favourites like Davina McCall who gets stuck in a lift, and Michael McIntyre brings out a new fitness DVD.
10	"Series 2 Episode 2"	Angie De Chastelai Smith	21 November 2010
In this episode Katie Price marries Ronnie Corbett however she gets frustrated because he keeps disappearing and Bruno goes on a cheeky rampage. And Heston Blumenthal, Gary Barlow, and Fabio Capello enter the series. We also find out what bad things have happened to celebrities
11	"Series 2 Episode 3"	Angie De Chastelai Smith	28 November 2010
In the third episode of the series, Lady GaGa visits a chicken shop, Anne Robinson tries to frighten the viewer, Joanna Lumley visits Jerusalem, The Nile Valley, Nepal and one of Europe's finest destinations, Katie Price appears on the Graham Norton show and Cheryl Cole marries a serial killer.
12	"Series 2 Episode 4"	Angie De Chastelai Smith	5 December 2010
In the fourth episode, Sophie Dahl goes to a ball, Bruno orders a pizza, Kirsty Young before she was famous, Jennifer Aniston appears on the Graham Norton Show, Bill Gates shows us what life is like in the Microsoft office with iPads and iPhones and James May creates his own Top Gear.
13	"Series 2 Episode 5"	Angie De Chastelai Smith	12 December 2010
Jimmy Carr and Piers Morgan are among the famous faces getting the Culshaw and Stephenson treatment. Plus the delicious period drama Sophie reaches its conclusion, and the audition for a new presenter on Loose Women yields surprising results.
14	"Series 2 Episode 6 (Christmas Special)"	Angie De Chastelai Smith	23 December 2010
Jon Culshaw and Debra Stephenson get festive in a special edition of the comedy sketch show. Katherine Jenkins and friends sing the classic Christmas number ones, Ian Hislop meets Santa, and old favourite Ross Kemp returns to meet a deadly gang with a seasonal twist.

=== Series 3 (2011) ===
No.	Title	Original release date	UK viewers (millions)
15	"Series 3 Episode 1"	26 October 2011	N/A
The new series of the impression show begins. New impressions include X Factor judges Louis Walsh and Tulisa Contostavlos, Claudia Winkleman (which is dropped without explanation halfway through the series) and Gregg Wallace among favourites including Davina McCall and Simon Cowell. The dragons from Dragons Den buy coffee, with a twist, Ann Widdecombe shares all her passions. and Paul McCartney's super pop group sing "Hello". We also find out what Paul O'Grady thinks of babies, Phillip Schofield is run by The Cube, the truth behind Mary Portas's visits to grade shops and how much Arlene Phillips misses Len Goodman.
16	"Series 3 Episode 2"	2 November 2011	N/A
New impressions including Jo Brand and Prince Charles come under the firing line. Plus Nick Robinson is pranking 10 Downing Street, Fabio Capello gives us his guide to England and Gok Wan makes a re-appearance selling his Gok Wan Wok Gun. Plus how does Harry Hill finds clips for You've Been Framed, Pat Butcher stars in her own movie and the Masterchef Judges prepare the contestants tasks. Meanwhile Bruce Forsyth runs into Arlene Phillips, Simon Cowell's bodyguard quits and Janet Street-Porter publicises her new iPhone app.
17	"Series 3 Episode 3"	9 November 2011	N/A
No celebrities are safe with Culshaw and Stephenson about. In this episode we all get some parenting tips from Elton John, Michael McIntyre loses his most treasured possession and Ross Kemp goes to meet the gang known on the streets as The Towies. Also Stacey Solomon is on the red carpet, Louis Walsh realises he should retire as an X Factor judge and Katie Price tells us the weather. Also Pat Butcher brings a man home, Tony Blair meets Kylie Minogue, Gok Wan stars in his own movie and Simon Cowell teachers us all how to make the big money.
18	"Series 3 Episode 4"	16 November 2011	N/A
In the fourth episode of the third series there's a fight in the BBC Newsroom, Jennifer Aniston's career takes a drastic new turn and Katie Price starts her own new finishing school. Also Ian Hislop opens up his own toy emporium, Boris Johnson shows how loony he is and Anne Robinson publicises her new 'I Phone Insult app'. Also thrown into the mix is Brian Cox on a trip to a volcano, Ricky Gervais discusses new programme ideas, Davina McCall hosts a slant on the Million Pound Drop and Dominic Littlewood fills in on The One Show.
19	"Series 3 Episode 5"	7 December 2011	N/A
Culshaw and Stephenson poke more fun at famous faces. In this episode John Bishop is amazed when he becomes a bishop, Jimmy Carr is an unexpected guest at a funeral and Ross Kemp goes on his most dangerous mission to date. Also, Kirsty Allsopp proves a distraction for a group of busy firefighters, Lorraine Kelly tells us the weather and Alan Carr hosts his own saucy show.
20	"Series 3 Episode 6"	14 December 2011	N/A
In this episode Nancy Dell'Olio pops up in unexpected places, Alan Carr gets on with his day job and Ken Barlow and Pat Butcher are in the middle of an un-expected romance.
21	"Series 3 Episode 7 (Best Of)"	21 December 2011	N/A
A summary of some of the best clips and impressions from Series 3 of the hit impressions show.

== DVD releases ==
- Series 1 – 1 February 2010
- Best of Series 1 (1 hour special) – 25 October 2010
- Series 2 – 19 March 2012
