= Lewis MacLeod (actor) =

Scottish actor (born 1970)

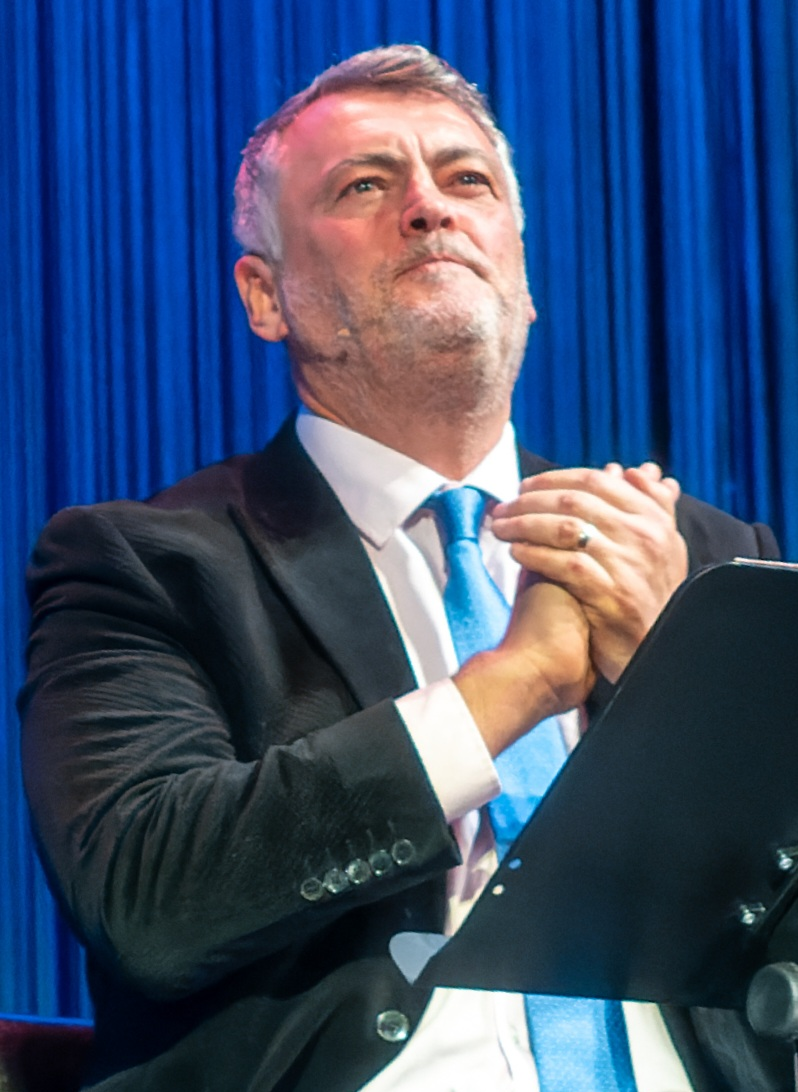
- MacLeod in 2023
- Born: 4 July 1970 (age 56); Glasgow, Scotland
- Occupations: Actor; voice actor; impressionist
- Years active: 1990–present
- Height: 6 ft 3 in (191 cm)
- Spouse: Marion Villegier (m. 2023)
- Children: 2
- Website: www.lewismacleod.com

Lewis MacLeod (born 4 July 1970) is a Scottish actor and impressionist.

== Early life ==
MacLeod was born in Glasgow to a family from the Isle of Lewis, and his hometowns are nearby Bearsden and Torrance. He took up an interest in dubbing and impressions from his brothers early in his life, and recorded his first amateur dub at the age of 14.

== Career ==
MacLeod is known for voicing various fictional characters, including Sebulba in Star Wars: Episode I – The Phantom Menace, Mr. Stubborn on The Mr. Men Show, Captain Pud in Little Big Planet 3, various characters in 64 Zoo Lane, Postman Pat in the children's television series Postman Pat, and the Earl on Cartoon Network's Skatoony. Since 1996, he has regularly worked as a voice actor for video games, including Jeff Wayne's The War of the Worlds (voicing the Martians), Harry Potter and the Goblet of Fire (voicing Albus Dumbledore), Star Wars: Galactic Battlegrounds (voicing Obi-Wan Kenobi), and Lego Star Wars: The Skywalker Saga (voicing Sebulba); in the 2016 simulation game Planet Coaster, he voiced the entertainer King Coaster. MacLeod has also appeared in several television shows, including Phoenix Nights, Look Around You, Endeavour, The Crown, and as Orson Welles on Toast of Tinseltown.

As an impressionist, MacLeod has appeared on 2DTV, Headcases, Newsjack, Off the Ball, Dead Ringers, Newzoids, Spitting Image, and BBC Radio 2, where he became known for impersonating Jeremy Vine. He had his own show on BBC Radio Scotland, Lewis MacLeod's Wired News, in 2013–16. In early 2026, he went viral for an impression of US president Donald Trump, mocking his Ukraine peace plan, which he enacted at Private Eye's Year in Review 2025 show. Some clips from his appearances as Trump on the BBC had already received social media attention in his native country in 2025.

== Personal life ==
A father of two, since February 2023 MacLeod has been married to French citizen Marion Villegier. The couple split their time between the respective countries.
