= Dead Ringers (franchise) =

British radio and TV comedy impressions show

- Created by: Bill Dare
- Original work: Dead Ringers (2000–2007)
- Owner: BBC
- Years: 2000–2007; 2014–present

Films and television
- Television series: Dead Ringers (2002–2007)

Audio
- Radio programs: Dead Ringers (2000–2007) (2014–present)

Dead Ringers is a British radio and television comedy impressions show broadcast on BBC Radio 4 and later BBC Two. The programme was devised by producer Bill Dare and developed with Jon Holmes, Andy Hurst and Simon Blackwell. Among its stars are Jon Culshaw and Jan Ravens. The BBC cancelled the television run in 2007 after five years. Dead Ringers returned to Radio 4 in 2014. In 2025, four members of the cast took part in the Dead Ringers 25th Anniversary Tour.

== History ==
Dead Ringers was devised and created by writer and producer Bill Dare. The programme first aired on BBC Radio 4 in January 2000.

In November 2001 BBC One said it had commissioned a pilot for a television version. The pilot was well received and in August 2002 a full series was commissioned, this time on BBC Two. The TV show ran for seven series and was axed in April 2009. In 2002 the BBC's Arena broadcast a documentary about the series entitled Radio Ha! – Meet The Dead Ringers, directed by Fisher Dilke. It featured interviews with the cast and writers, and behind-the-scenes footage from a studio recording from the eighth series.

Dead Ringers returned to Radio 4 in 2014. The show continued to run for over ten years.

The cast embarked on the Dead Ringers 25th Anniversary Tour in 2025, performing live at numerous venues across the UK, and the show continued into 2026. The Times gave the show four stars, describing the performance as "Four world-class virtuosos doing their astonishing thing".

== Cast ==
=== Radio ===
- Jon Culshaw (2000–2007; 2014-present)
- Jan Ravens (2000–2007; 2014-present)
- Phil Cornwell (2000–2007)
- Kevin Connelly (2000–2007)
- Mark Perry (2000–2007)
- Duncan Wisbey (2014–present)
- Lewis MacLeod (2014–present)
- Debra Stephenson (2014–present)

=== Television ===
- Jon Culshaw (2002–2007)
- Jan Ravens (2002–2007)
- Phil Cornwell (2002–2007)
- Kevin Connelly (2002–2007)
- Mark Perry (2002–2007)

== Awards ==
Year	Nominee / work	Award	Result
2001	Dead Ringers	Radio Academy Awards Gold – The Comedy Award	Won
2001	Dead Ringers	Broadcasting Press Guild Award for Best Radio Programme	Won
2001	Dead Ringers	The British Comedy Awards – Best Radio Comedy	Won
2001	Dead Ringers	The Heritage Foundation Awards – Best Radio Comedy Show	Won

== Home media ==
=== Radio series ===
Title	Episodes	Runtime	No. of discs	CD release date	Audio cassette release date	Digital download release date
Dead Ringers	4	1 hr 50 mins	2 discs	6 November 2000	6 November 2000	15 February 2005
Dead Ringers: Series 2 Part 1	4	1 hr 45 mins	2 discs	2 July 2001	2 July 2001	6 April 2005
Dead Ringers: Series 2, Part 2	4	1 hr 50 mins	2 discs	5 November 2001	5 November 2001	6 April 2005
Dead Ringers: The Specials (Note: Contains The Archers Special, the Election 2001 Special and 50 minutes of unbroadcast material.)	2	1 hr 50 mins	2 discs	19 November 2001	19 November 2001	31 March 2005
Dead Ringers: Series 3	5	2 hrs 20 mins	2 discs	1 July 2002	1 July 2002	1 June 2012
Dead Ringers: Series 4	4	1 hr 45 mins	2 discs	4 November 2002	4 November 2002	6 April 2005
Dead Ringers: Series 5 & 6	8	3 hrs 30 mins	4 discs	4 November 2002	4 November 2002	31 March 2005
Dead Ringers: Collection (Note: Contains Series 1-3.)	17	7 hrs 45 mins	8 discs	11 November 2002; 7 April 2003 (MP3-CD)	—N/a	—N/a
Dead Ringers: Series 7	4	1 hr 50 mins	2 discs	3 February 2003	3 February 2003	31 March 2005
Dead Ringers: Series 8	4	1 hr 50 mins	2 discs	5 May 2003	—N/a	5 April 2012
Dead Ringers: Series 9	4	1 hr 50 mins	2 discs	7 July 2003	—N/a	31 March 2005
Dead Ringers: Collection 2 (Note: Contains Series 4-6, plus the Golden Jubilee Special, which was exclusive to the set.)	13	5 hrs 45 mins	7 discs	10 November 2003	—N/a	—N/a
Dead Ringers: Series 10	5	2 hrs 20 mins	2 discs	1 March 2004	—N/a	—N/a
Dead Ringers: The Best of the Radio Series	—N/a	2 hrs	2 discs	3 October 2005	—N/a	17 October 2005
Dead Ringers: Series 12	6	3 hrs	3 discs	11 June 2015	—N/a	11 June 2015
Dead Ringers: Series 13 & 14	7	3 hrs 15 mins	4 discs	1 October 2015	—N/a	1 October 2015
Dead Ringers: Series 15 (Note: Contains Series 15, plus the Christmas 2015 Special and A Look Back at the Year 2020 Special.)	7	3 hrs 10 mins	4 discs	2 June 2016	—N/a	2 June 2016
Dead Ringers: Series 16 (Note: Contains Series 16, plus the Christmas 2016 Special and The Alternative 2016 Special.)	8	3 hrs 40 mins	—N/a	—N/a	—N/a	2 March 2017
Dead Ringers: Series 17 (Note: Contains Series 17, plus the Christmas 2017 Special and The End of the World Special.)	8	3 hrs 40 mins	—N/a	—N/a	—N/a	1 March 2018
Dead Ringers: Series 18 (Note: Contains Series 18, plus the An Alien Has Landed Special.)	7	3 hrs 30 mins	—N/a	—N/a	—N/a	4 October 2018

=== TV series ===
Title	Runtime	No. of discs	CD release date	Audio cassette release date	Digital download release date	DVD and VHS release date
Dead Ringers: The Television Series (Note: DVD & VHS release includes the pilot episode.)	2 hrs	2 discs	3 November 2003	3 November 2003	15 February 2005	7 July 2003
Dead Ringers: The Television Series 2	2 hrs 10 mins	2 discs	5 July 2004	5 July 2004	16 March 2009	—N/a
Dead Ringers: The Television Series 3	2 hrs	2 discs	29 November 2004	—N/a	—N/a	—N/a
