= Jon Culshaw =

English comedian and actor (born 1968)

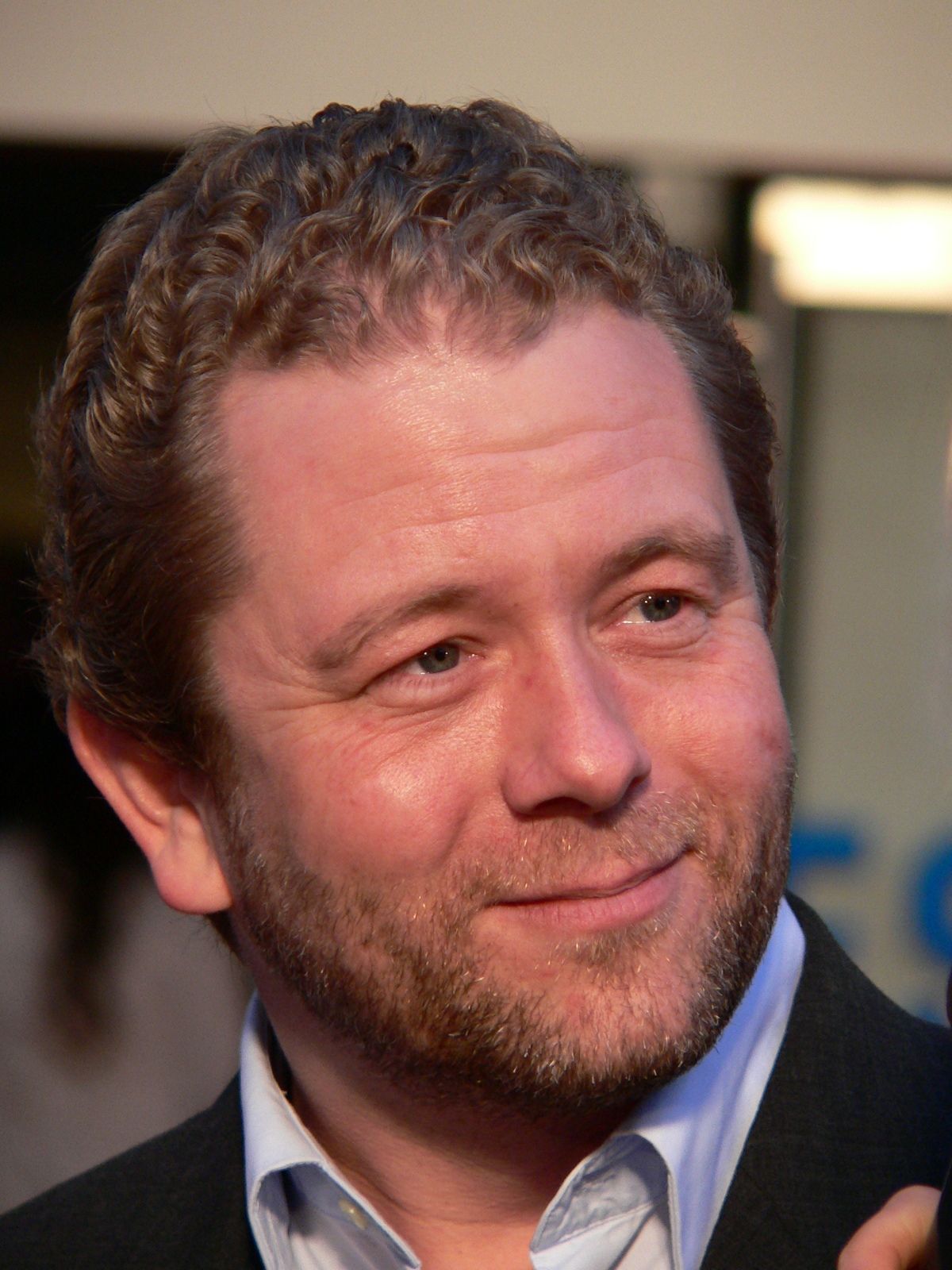
- Culshaw in 2006
- Born: Jonathan Peter Culshaw; 2 June 1968 (age 58); Ormskirk, Lancashire, England
- Notable work: Dead Ringers (2000–2007, 2014–present); 2DTV (2001–04); The Impressionable Jon Culshaw (2004); Headcases (2008); The Impressions Show (2009–2011); Newzoids (2015–2016)

Comedy career
- Years active: 1980s–present
- Genres: Impressions, sketch comedy

Jonathan Peter Culshaw (born 2 June 1968) is an English actor, comedian and impressionist. He is best known for his work on the radio comedy Dead Ringers since 2000.

Culshaw has voiced a number of characters for ITV shows including 2DTV (2001–03), Spitting Image (1994–96) and Newzoids (2015–2016), as well as appearing in The Impressions Show alongside Debra Stephenson from 2009 to 2011.

== Early life and career ==
Culshaw was born on 2 June 1968 in Ormskirk, Lancashire, and educated at St Bede's Catholic High School and St John Rigby College, Wigan.

Culshaw's radio career began in hospital radio in Ormskirk. His first job was at Red Rose Radio (now Rock FM) in Preston in 1987, where, even then, he used to occasionally read the weather in the voice of Frank Bruno. He did voice-over work, then was catapulted to prominence with Spitting Image, where he voiced around forty characters, including John Major in the 1990s, who was then the Prime Minister.

For around four years in the late 1980s, Culshaw was a DJ on commercial radio station Viking FM, based in Hull, and also had a breakfast show on Pennine Radio (now the Pulse of West Yorkshire) and Radio Wave in Blackpool. It was a receptionist at Viking FM who persuaded Culshaw that he should go onstage with his impressions and make it his living. Culshaw later appeared on BBC Radio 2's It's Been a Bad Week, appeared as a guest on the BBC Two Star Trek Night quiz in August 1996, and was also a regular guest on the Chris Moyles afternoon show on BBC Radio 1 from 1998 to 2002, where he would phone up commercial organisations such as a Kwik-Fit garage in the voice of Patrick Moore or Obi-Wan Kenobi politely requesting whether they could service his X-wing fighter and how much time it would take.

== Career ==
=== Radio ===
Culshaw rose to fame in January 1998 while working with Steve Penk on Capital Radio, by impersonating William Hague and succeeding in contacting Number 10 Downing Street. He was put through to Tony Blair who, despite instantly discovering the ruse, had a lengthy conversation with him until a member of Blair's staff ended the call.

Culshaw was one of the stars of the BBC Radio 4 comedy series Dead Ringers, which ran from 2000 to 2007 as well as the BBC Two television series of the same name, from 2002 until 2007. The radio series of Dead Ringers made a return to BBC Radio 4 in 2014.

In 2018, Culshaw gave a rare dramatic performance as David Bowie in the BBC radio play The Final Take: Bowie in the Studio, an imagined account of Bowie as he works on his final album and looks back over his life.

=== Television ===
Between 2001 and 2002, Culshaw hosted a programme on ITV called Alter Ego, where he interviewed male celebrities in their own style of speaking, a form of simultaneous translation. Culshaw also appeared on 2DTV, a cartoon version of Spitting Image. In early 2004, using the same production team, he had his own programme, The Impressionable Jon Culshaw commissioned for ITV.

In 2005, Culshaw was a celebrity contestant on Comic Relief Does Fame Academy and was the fourth person to become eliminated. In the same year, he also appeared in the BBC General Election coverage, in the guises of Tony Blair and George W. Bush. In January 2006, Culshaw presented one series of the BBC programme Jon Culshaw's Commercial Breakdown. In November 2007 and December 2008, Culshaw, a keen amateur astronomer, appeared on The Sky at Night impersonating a young Sir Patrick Moore. In March 2011, he appeared again on the 700th episode of The Sky at Night, reading viewer questions to the panel of experts. Culshaw later appeared two months later reporting on the Northern Lights.

In January 2008, he appeared on Big Brother: Celebrity Hijack, as part of a pub-quiz team with Chris Moyles. In May 2008, Culshaw appeared in the BBC documentary series Comedy Map of Britain.

From 2009 until 2011, Culshaw starred in the BBC One comedy sketch show The Impressions Show with Culshaw and Stephenson alongside Debra Stephenson.

On 13 March 2010, Culshaw was a guest judge on the BBC One charity programme Let's Dance for Comic Relief. In 2013, he appeared as a contestant on the show, where he performed a routine to "Praise You" by Fatboy Slim. However, he was eliminated by the public vote.

In 2010, Culshaw appeared in the television series, Missing as Des Martin. In November 2013, Culshaw appeared in the one-off 50th anniversary comedy homage The Five(ish) Doctors Reboot.

In 2015, he has voiced a number of characters alongside Debra Stephenson for the ITV sketch show Newzoids. A second series aired in 2016.

In 2017, Culshaw was one of the minor hosts of the Channel 5 documentary series Secrets of the National Trust. In February 2021, Culshaw appeared on Celebrity Mastermind. His specialist subject was "Doctor Who – the Jon Pertwee Years".

In 2021, Culshaw appeared as a guest on Celebrity Yorkshire Auction House, series 1 episode 2. He entertained the auction company's staff when they collected his sale items, and the buyers that attended the auction. He also donated all of the proceeds of the sale to charity.

Until 2023, Culshaw narrated the Channel 4 property series Sun, Sea, and Selling Houses.

=== Film ===
In film, Culshaw appeared as Tony Blair in the 2004 film Churchill: The Hollywood Years and voiced Piston Pete in the 2008 film Agent Crush.

=== Impressions ===
Some of Culshaw's most famous impressions include former British Prime Ministers Tony Blair and Boris Johnson, current British Prime Minister Andy Burnham, Obi-Wan Kenobi (as portrayed by Alec Guinness), Russell Crowe, Presidents George W. Bush and Donald Trump, Ozzy Osbourne, comedian Michael McIntyre, presenter Dale Winton, newsreader Brian Perkins, Sir Patrick Moore, Tom Baker and Les Dawson.

=== Doctor Who ===
A lifelong fan of sci-fi series Doctor Who, Culshaw used his impression of Fourth Doctor actor Tom Baker for both the TV and radio versions of Dead Ringers. He voiced several characters in the 2001 BBC webcast Doctor Who: Death Comes to Time.

Culshaw also regularly appears in Doctor Who audio plays for Big Finish Productions. As well as playing Earl Rivers in The Kingmaker in 2006, he used his Baker impression to briefly play the Fourth Doctor. Along with numerous other roles, Culshaw has since become the regular voice of characters in Doctor Who history for which the original actors are deceased or unavailable, including Kameleon (originally played by Gerald Flood), Brigadier Lethbridge-Stewart (Nicholas Courtney) and The Master actors Roger Delgado and Anthony Ainley. As well as occasional appearances as the Third Doctor (Jon Pertwee), Culshaw headlines as the Twelfth Doctor (Peter Capaldi) for a series that began July 2026.

== Awards and honours ==
In 2006, Culshaw received an honorary fellowship from the University of Central Lancashire in Preston. In December 2010, he was awarded an honorary doctorate by Edge Hill University. In July 2013 he was awarded an honorary Doctor of Laws degree from the University of Leicester. In March 2019, Culshaw sat for British impressionist artist Sherree Valentine-Daines for a portrait painted to mark the opening of the Clarendon Fine Art Gallery in Hampstead, London.

== Charity ==
Culshaw is a celebrity ambassador for the charity Trekstock.

Culshaw also supports the Starlight Children's Foundation.

Culshaw regularly presents Gold Duke of Edinburgh's Awards as part of his support for the charity.

In 2016, he participated in the Great North Run to raise funds for the Jon Egging Trust, a charity set up in memory of the Red Arrows flight lieutenant who died while flying at the Red Arrows Display at the Bournemouth Air Festival.

== Filmography ==
Film

Year	Title	Role
2004	Churchill: The Hollywood Years	Tony Blair
2008	Agent Crush	Piston Pete (voice)
2019	The Queen's Corgi	President Donald Trump / Bernard St. Bernard (voices)

Television

Year	Title	Role	Channel
1994–1996	Spitting Image	Various voices	ITV
2001	Alter Ego	Starring	ITV
2001–2003	2DTV	Voice	ITV
2002	Room 101	Patrick Moore	BBC Two
2002–2007	Dead Ringers	Starring	BBC Two
2004	The Impressionable Jon Culshaw	Starring	ITV
2004	Little Britain, Series 2 Episode 5	Andrew Lloyd Webber	BBC Three
2006	The Slammer	Guest	BBC One
2006	The Secret Policeman's Ball 2006	Guest	Channel 4
2007	The Sky at Night	Young Patrick Moore	BBC One
2007	Red Nose Day 2007	Various	BBC One
2007	Kombat Opera Presents	Guest	BBC Two
2008	Headcases	Voice	ITV
2008-2014	Horrible Histories (2009 TV series)	Various characters	CBBC / BBC One
2009–2011	The Impressions Show with Culshaw and Stephenson	Starring	BBC One
2013	Let's Dance for Comic Relief	Contestant	BBC One
2013	The Five(ish) Doctors Reboot	Tom Baker (voice)	BBC Red Button
2015–	Horrible Histories (2015 TV series)	Various characters	CBBC
2015–2016	Newzoids	Various voices	ITV
2017	Secrets of the National Trust	Co-presenter	Channel 5
2017-2023	Sun, Sea and Selling Houses	Narrator	Channel 4
2023	Partygate	Boris Johnson	Channel 4

Guest appearances

- Who Wants to Be a Millionaire? (2007, 2013)
- Celebrity Are You Smarter than a Ten Year Old? (2008)
- Hotel Babylon (2008)
- Celebrity Mastermind (2008)
- Heston's Eighties Feast (2010)
- The Sky at Night (2011)
- Stargazing Live (2012)
- Celebrity Antiques Road Trip (2012)
- Britain's Secret Treasures (2012)
- Pointless Celebrities (2012, 2014)
- The Chase: Celebrity Special (2013)
- Tipping Point: Lucky Stars (2014)
- Holiday of My Lifetime (2014)
- Bruce Forsyth's Hall of Fame (2014)
- Get Your Act Together (2015)
- All Star Family Fortunes (2015)
- This Week (2015)
- Sunday Brunch (2015)
- The Paul O'Grady Show (2015)
- Celebrity Money for Nothing (2017)
- The Hairy Bikers Home for Christmas (2017)
