= The John Baker Tapes =

The John Baker Tapes are 2008 compilations of music and effects recorded by John Baker published in two volumes. The first volume focuses on his work at the BBC Radiophonic Workshop while the second focuses on his freelance work. A vinyl edition was also released with tracks selected from both volumes.

== Volume 1: BBC Radiophonics ==
The John Baker Tapes Volume 1: BBC Radiophonics

Compilation album by John Baker
- Released: July 2008
- Recorded: 1963–1974
- Genre: Electronic music
- Label: Trunk Records
- Producer: Johnny Trunk and Alan Gubby

BBC Radiophonic Workshop chronology
Music from the BBC Radiophonic Workshop (2003)	The John Baker Tapes Volume 1: BBC Radiophonics (2008)	BBC Radiophonic Workshop - A Retrospective (2008)

John Baker chronology
The John Baker Tapes Volume 1: BBC Radiophonics (2008)	The John Baker Tapes Volume 2: Soundtracks, Library, Home Recordings, Electro Ads (2008)

=== Track listing ===
All tracks are written by John Baker

No.	Title	Length
1.	"Newstime BBC 1+2"	0:23
2.	"Tros Y Gareg (Main Theme)"	2:50
3.	"Tros Y Gareg (Idents)"	0:20
4.	"20th Century Focus"	2:22
5.	"Vendetta: The Ice Cream Man"	1:18
6.	"Woman's Hour (reading your letters)"	1:47
7.	"Many a Slip"	0:57
8.	"Look and Read"	0:35
9.	"Building The Bomb"	6:24
10.	"Au Printemps"	2:27
11.	"Big Ben News Theme"	0:33
12.	"Codename"	1:03
13.	"Decimal Currency"	0:20
14.	"Barnacle Bill"	0:21
15.	"Dial M For Murder"	2:25
16.	"Farm Management"	0:30
17.	"Radio Sheffield (News Idents)"	0:45
18.	"French Science And Technology"	0:39
19.	"Good Morning Wales"	0:39
20.	"Heavy Plant Crossing"	0:59
21.	"COI Technology Pavilion"	9:30
22.	"John Baker Interview (Radio Nottingham)"	2:33
23.	"Radio Nottingham Idents"	0:34
24.	"Look North: Newstime"	0:50
25.	"Man Alive: UFO"	1:14
26.	"PM - Computers In Business"	0:39
27.	"Submarines"	1:59
28.	"Oranges and Lemons (Radio London)"	2:36
29.	"Orbit"	0:47
30.	"Places For People"	0:47
31.	"Sling Your Hook"	2:27
32.	"Suivez La Piste"	0:49
33.	"Scene (Never Never)"	1:40
34.	"Diary Of A Madman"	3:54
35.	"The Two O'Clock Spot"	0:58
36.	"Radio London: News Idents"	0:25
37.	"The Caves of Steel"	3:11
38.	"The Locusts"	0:45
39.	"Square Two"	0:29
40.	"The Tape Recorder"	:1:11
41.	"Tom Tom (Theme)"	0:42
42.	"Tom Tom (Idents)"	0:15
43.	"Trial (Opening Theme)"	0:35
44.	"Trial (Closing Theme)"	1:22
45.	"Vendetta: The Sugar Man"	2:01
46.	"Spin Off"	0:21
47.	"Radiophonic FX C"	0:10
48.	"Radiophonic FX A"	0:54
49.	"Radiophonic FX B"	0:35

== Volume 2: Soundtracks, Library, Home Recordings, Electro Ads ==
The John Baker Tapes - Volume 2: Soundtracks, Library, Home Recordings, Electro Ads

Compilation album by John Baker
- Released: July 2008
- Recorded: 1954–1985
- Genre: Electronic music
- Label: Trunk Records
- Producer: Johnny Trunk and Alan Gubby

John Baker chronology
The John Baker Tapes Volume 1: BBC Radiophonics (2008)	The John Baker Tapes Volume 2: Soundtracks, Library, Home Recordings, Electro Ads (2008)	The John Baker Tapes (2008)

=== Track listing ===
All tracks are written by John Baker, except where noted, Compositions written under the pseudonym "John Matthews" noted with an asterisk (*)

No.	Title	Length
1.	"Tempo Counter"	0:04
2.	"Get Happy"	3:54
3.	Untitled (* Electro-Twist MQ LP1/1 1:23)
4.	"Electro-Suspense MQ LP1/2" (*)	1:27
5.	"Electro-Rhythm MQ LP1/3" (*)	1:23
6.	"Electro-Slow MQ LP1/4" (*)	1:33
7.	"Boy On A Bicycle"	4:03
8.	"Brass Bandied MQ LP14/1" (*)	1:17
9.	"Brass Widow MQ LP14/2" (*)	1:38
10.	"Omo And Giro Adverts"	1:20
11.	"I Wanna Hold Your Hand Medley"	2:33
12.	"Electro-Auto MQ LP35/1" (*)	1:29
13.	"Electro 5/4 MQ LP35/2" (*)	1:30
14.	"Electro Waltz MQ LP35/3" (*)	1:28
15.	"Johnny Johnson Jingles"	1:25
16.	"1980s Feedback Loop"	0:04
17.	"Requioso - PIL 9011" (*)	2:21
18.	"JB Dubs"	1:13
19.	"Out Of Nowhere"	5:23
20.	"Electro-Beat MQ LP19/1" (*)	1:30
21.	"Electro-Weird MQ LP19/2" (*)	1:24
22.	"Electro-Fugue MQ LP19/3" (*)	1:14
23.	"Electro-Aggression MQ LP38/1" (*)	1:57
24.	"Electro-Tension MQ LP38/2" (*)	2:27
25.	"Jazz Advert"	1:38
26.	"Brylcreem"	0:30
27.	"John Baker Goon Advert"	0:34
28.	"Power Source MQ LP39" (*)	3:23
29.	"1980s Tape FX"	0:42
30.	"Pots 'N' Pans MQ LP48/1" (John Matthews & Anthony King)	3:24
31.	"Banshee Boogie MQ LP48/2" (John Matthews & Anthony King)	1:45
32.	"Feedback MQ LP48/3" (John Matthews & Anthony King)	2:58
33.	"Space Workshop MQ LP48/4" (John Matthews & Anthony King)	3:12
34.	"Piano Concrete MQ LP48/5" (*)	2:55
35.	"JB Test Tone"	0:08
36.	"Piano Strokes"	2:25
37.	"JB At Home On The Piano"	0:51
38.	"Brief Lives - JB Obituary" (Richard Anthony Baker)	1:47
39.	"JB 78 RPM - All The Things You Are"	2:26

== Vinyl version ==
The John Baker Tapes

Compilation album by John Baker
- Released: 19 August 2008
- Recorded: 1954–1985
- Genre: Electronic music
- Label: Trunk Records
- Producer: Johnny Trunk and Alan Gubby

John Baker chronology
The John Baker Tapes Volume 2: Soundtracks, Library, Home Recordings, Electro Ads (2008)	The John Baker Tapes (2008)	The Vendetta Tapes (2015)

=== Track listing ===
All tracks are written by John Baker except where noted

Side A
No.	Title	Length
1.	"Newstime BBC 1+2"	0:23
2.	"Troes Y Gareg"	2:50
3.	"Woman's Hour (Reading Your Letters)"	1:47
4.	"Look And Read"	0:35
5.	"Au Printemps"	2:27
6.	"Square Two"	0:29
7.	"Codename"	1:03
8.	"Decimal Currency"	0:20
9.	"Dial M For Murder"	2:25
10.	"Scene (Never Never)"	1:40
11.	"Computers In Business"	0:27
12.	"Heavy Plant Crossing"	0:59
13.	"Spin Off"	0:21
14.	"Vendetta: The Sugar Man"	2:01

Side B
No.	Title	Length
1.	"COI Technology Pavilion"	9:30
2.	"Tempo Counter"	0:04
3.	"Omo & Giro Ads"	1:20
4.	"Jonny Johnson Jingles"	1:25
5.	"JB Dubs"	1:13
6.	"Brylcreem"	0:30
7.	"John Baker Goon Advert"	0:34
8.	"Jazz Advert"	1:38
9.	"Piano Strokes"	2:25
10.	"Brief Lives - JB Obituary" (Richard Anthony Baker)	1:47
11.	"JB At Home On The Piano"	0:51

== Bibliography ==
- The John Baker Tapes Volume 1 (booklet). Trunk Records. 2008. JBH028CD.
- The John Baker Tapes Volume 2 (booklet). Trunk Records. 2008. JBH029CD.
- The John Baker Tapes (Liner notes). Trunk Records. 2008. JBH030LP.
