= United States of Whatever =

Single by Liam Lynch

from the album Fake Songs
- B-side: "Sir Track"
- Released: November 25, 2002
- Recorded: 1999
- Genre: Comedy rock, punk rock
- Length: 1:26 (original version); 2:04 (extended version)
- Label: Global Warming
- Songwriter: Liam Lynch

Audio
- “United States of Whatever" on YouTube

"United States of Whatever" is a song by American musician Liam Lynch. The song was released in 2002 as the first single from his album Fake Songs. The improvised song was written by Lynch himself. "United States of Whatever" is a comedy rock song that revolves around Lynch dismissively shouting "Whatever!" to various people.

The song received mostly positive reviews from music critics who praised its humor and its take on American youth. "United States of Whatever" peaked within the top ten of the charts in Australia and the United Kingdom, and until 2007 was the shortest song to appear on the charts in the latter country. The song has spawned various parodies, and Lynch has performed the song with artists like Tony Kanal, Adrian Young and Foo Fighters.

== Background and composition ==
"United States of Whatever" was solely written by Liam Lynch. Lynch has stated that the song was improvised and recorded in a single take. The song is performed in a punk rock and surf rock style. Its basic structure consists of two power-chord riffs played by an overdriven distorted bass guitar. The song begins with a dismissive "whatever", and each verse describes a short encounter with a person which abruptly ends with Lynch dismissing the person with the word. The chorus proclaims: "This is my United States of whatever!" He also dismisses people he should not ignore for his own well-being, such as a street thug and a police officer. The final verse describes an encounter with Zafo, a character from the TV series The Sifl and Olly Show, created by Lynch. Breaking the lyrical structure of the song, Zafo is spared the disparaging remark.

The song debuted on a 1999 episode of The Sifl and Olly Show, where it is shown being performed by Olly, a character on the show voiced by Lynch.

== Reception ==
While reviewing Fake Songs MacKenzie Wilson of the website Allmusic specifically praised "United States of Whatever", describing it as a "sock-puppet favorite" and "an absolute standout that crassly makes fun of American youth in its own self-deprecating kind of way." The review also noted that the British music publication NME named it as a "Single of the Week" in 2002. British disc jockey Steve Lamacq named it "the greatest single of 2002".

The song first attracted commercial popularity when it started appearing on the request charts on Los Angeles radio station KROQ after the song was leaked from a British import of The Sifl and Olly Show. The track was burned onto a CD-R, which was sent to the station. A physical single was eventually released on November 25, 2002. Following its CD single release, the song became a hit, debuting at number ten on the UK Singles Chart on the chart week of December 7, 2002. At 1 minutes and 26 seconds in length, it held the record for the shortest single to enter the UK Singles Chart before the record was beaten by the shorter singles "Spider Pig" by Hans Zimmer and "The Ladies' Bras" by Jonny Trunk and Wisbey, which hit the charts within three weeks of each other in 2007. It debuted at number six on the Australian ARIA Singles Chart on the chart week of June 8, 2003, staying in the top ten of the chart for a total of six weeks. The song also managed to hit the singles charts of Belgium, the Netherlands and New Zealand. The song was later included on Lynch's album Fake Songs (2003).

== Live performances and parodies ==
Lynch performed the song with bassist Tony Kanal and drummer Adrian Young, both members of rock band No Doubt, on an episode of the American late-night television talk and variety show The Late Late Show with Craig Kilborn. In 2003, Lynch performed the song with American rock band Foo Fighters at one of their concerts.

The song is played weekly on the Charlottesville, Virginia radio station WWWV as a part of their "Friday Freakout" segment. It was used in an advertisement for the 2003 video game Tony Hawk's Underground and was used in a video of behind-the-scenes content from the 2006 comedy film Clerks II. The song was also used in the 2023 anime Scott Pilgrim Takes Off.

A version of the song called the "Bush Remix" was popular during the administration of President George W. Bush. The song's lyrics reflect the then-President's cavalier attitude towards his decision to go to war with Iraq, and also throws barbs at Russian leader Vladimir Putin, the late terrorist Osama bin Laden and the late North Korean leader Kim Jong-il.

== Track listing ==
All tracks are written by Liam Lynch.

UK CD single
No.	Title	Length
1.	"United States of Whatever"	1:26
2.	"United States of Whatever" (Extended Version)	2:04
3.	"Sir Track"	1:34

== Charts ==
=== Weekly charts ===
Chart (2002–2003)	Peak position
Australia (ARIA)	6
Belgium (Ultratop Flanders)	13
Netherlands (Mega Single Top 100)	78
New Zealand (RIANZ)	14
Scottish Singles Sales (Official Charts)	10
UK Singles (Official Charts Company)	10
UK Indie (Official Charts)	1
US Alternative Songs (Billboard)	34

=== Year-end charts ===
Chart (2003)	Position
Australia (ARIA)	79

== Certifications ==
Region	Certification	Certified units/sales
Australia (ARIA)	Gold	35,000^{^}
^{^} Shipments figures based on certification alone.
