= Steve's Lava Chicken =

2025 song by Jack Black

Song by Jack Black

from the album A Minecraft Movie (Original Motion Picture Soundtrack)
- Released: March 28, 2025
- Genre: Novelty; jingle
- Length: 0:34 (original); 1:15 (extended)
- Label: WaterTower Music
- Songwriters: Jack Black; Jared Hess
- Producers: John Spiker; Mark Mothersbaugh

Music video
- "Steve's Lava Chicken" on YouTube

"Steve's Lava Chicken" is a song performed by American actor and musician Jack Black from the soundtrack for A Minecraft Movie (2025). A novelty song, it is used as a jingle for a scene where Black's character in the film, Steve, cooks a live chicken by pouring lava onto it. The song was co-written by Black and the film's director Jared Hess, and is 34 seconds long. The song broke several records—particularly in the United States and the United Kingdom—as the shortest song to chart on the Billboard Hot 100 and the UK Singles Chart, respectively. It also charted in multiple other countries. It has been certified gold by the Recording Industry Association of America and silver by the British Phonographic Industry.

== Background and release ==
"Steve's Lava Chicken" is used in a scene in A Minecraft Movie where Steve—a character portrayed in the film by Black—showcases a contraption he made that cooks live chickens in lava. The subject of the song is the cooked chicken resulting from the contraption. The song itself is about 34 seconds long, and was co-written by Black and the film's director Jared Hess.

The soundtrack for A Minecraft Movie, including "Steve's Lava Chicken", was released on March 28, 2025, through WaterTower Music. A 50-second clip from the film featuring the song, labeled by WaterTower as its official music video, was released on April 9, 2025. An EP by Black, I...Am Steve, featuring an extended version of "Steve's Lava Chicken" along with other songs from the film's soundtrack, was released on April 18, 2025. The extended version is 1 minute and 15 seconds long. A remix of the "Steve's Lava Chicken" instrumental was added to Minecraft in June 2025 as a music disc, with players able to obtain the disc by killing a chicken jockey.

== Commercial performance ==
In the United States, "Steve's Lava Chicken" received over 2.5 million streams in the week of the film's release, a 1,973% increase in streams from the week prior to its release. The song later debuted at number 78 on the Hot 100 for the week dated May 3, 2025, breaking the record for the shortest song in the chart's history, surpassing Kid Cudi's "Beautiful Trip", which is 37 seconds long. "Steve's Lava Chicken" was certified gold by the Recording Industry Association of America in September 2025.

In the United Kingdom, "Steve's Lava Chicken" peaked at number nine on the UK Singles Chart on May 2, 2025 ‒ for the week ending May 8, 2025 ‒ during its third week on the chart. It broke the record for the shortest song to ever appear in the top 40 of the UK Singles Chart. The previous record holder was "The Ladies' Bras", a song by Jonny Trunk and Duncan Wisbey that was 36 seconds long. The song became Black's highest-charting song in Britain, surpassing "Peaches", a song from the soundtrack for The Super Mario Bros. Movie (2023). It was certified silver by the British Phonographic Industry in July 2025.

== Critical reception ==
In a list article discussing the best and worst things to happen in 2025, Pitchfork placed the commercial performance records set by "Steve's Lava Chicken" as one of the low points of the year, assigning it a 1.9 out of 10 score on the scale.

== Charts ==
=== Weekly charts ===
Weekly chart performance
Chart (2025)	Peak position
Australia (ARIA)	71
Canada Hot 100 (Billboard)	64
Global 200 (Billboard)	97
Ireland (IRMA)	19
New Zealand (Recorded Music NZ)	28
Norway (VG-lista)	75
Sweden (Sverigetopplistan)	69
UK Singles (Official Charts)	9
UK Indie (Official Charts)	2
US Billboard Hot 100	78
US Hot Rock & Alternative Songs (Billboard)	12

=== Year-end charts ===
Year-end chart performance
Chart (2025)	Position
US Hot Rock & Alternative Songs (Billboard)	33

== Certifications ==
Certifications
Region	Certification	Certified units/sales
United Kingdom (BPI)	Silver	200,000^{‡}
United States (RIAA)	Gold	500,000^{‡}
^{‡} Sales+streaming figures based on certification alone.
