= The Week That Wasn't (British TV programme) =

British television programme

- Genre: Satirical television
- Starring: Alistair McGowan; Ronni Ancona; Matt Forde; Duncan Wisbey; Jess Robinson; Luke Kempner
- Country of origin: United Kingdom
- Original language: English

Original release
- Network: Sky UK
- Release: 2018

The Week That Wasn't is a British late-night news satire television programme series that started on 17 May 2018 on Sky UK and revoices real news footage.

It was literally putting words into the mouths of news figures, and features the voices and writing of Alistair McGowan, Ronni Ancona, Matt Forde, Duncan Wisbey, Jess Robinson, and Luke Kempner.

== See also ==
- That Was the Week That Was
- This Is That
