= Four in a Bed series 6 =

Four in a Bed
- Series 6
- No. of episodes: 40

Release
- Original network: Channel 4
- Original release: 10 March – 30 May 2014

Series chronology
- ← Previous; Series 5 Next → Series 7

Four in a Bed is a British reality television game show, a spin-off of a similar now defunct primetime equivalent known as Three in a Bed. The show involves four sets of B&B owners competing to have their B&B crowned the best value for money. The sixth series has been broadcast on Channel 4 since 10 March 2014, following the broadcaster's decision to renew the show for another series. It currently airs at 5.00 p.m. weekdays.

The programme is voiced over by the English actor, impressionist & musician Duncan Wisbey

== Format ==
A group of four sets of B&B owners come together to assess the quality of each other's establishments, but not their own. At every visit to one of the four B&B's, the owner/s of the establishment will greet the others and will then show them to their room, where its cost and information on breakfast will usually be given to them. Once the owner/s of the establishment have left the room, the fellow guest B&B owners, each in their individual rooms, will give their first impressions. Once everyone is settled in, the guests are taken to an activity devised by the owner/s. The owner/s will hope to show their nature as well as the nature of the B&B somewhere within this activity. Following the activity, the guests go back to their rooms and soon join the hosting B&B owner/s for an evening meal. This sometimes takes place at the B&B, however it can take place elsewhere upon recommendation by the owner/s. This provides an ample opportunity for the other B&B owners to get to know each other and particularly the hosting B&B owner/s better, asking questions such as how they got into the business for example. Then, the guests will go back to their rooms and finish the day sharing their thoughts on both the B&B and the other guests.

The next morning, the guests will each usually offer feedback on how they slept, and the host/s will prepare breakfast for the others. Once breakfast has been served and consumed, the guests will fill out an anonymous feedback form where they can summarize all of their criticisms, both positive and negative, into one, by both scoring a series of relevant categories out of ten and writing any comments they wish about their stay, including if they would like to stay again. They will then place in an envelope how much money they think their stay was worth in relation to the asking price of their room. In order to resolve any differences in price between the different rooms and B&B's, the host's final score is presented as a percentage. For example, if one set of owners paid £60 for a room that normally sells for £80, thereby only paying 75%, and the other set paid £110 for a stay that normally commands £100, thereby paying 110%, the host's final score would be 94%. This money is sealed and the host alongside the other owners cannot see its contents until all of the owners have had their B&B's visited and critiqued. However, the owner/s can look at the anonymous feedback forms and this may influence what they say or do in the coming visits to B&B's of the other B&B owners.

Once everyone has had their own B&B inspected by the others, the four sets of B&B owners gather around a table to open the sealed envelopes from every visit, ask questions about their anonymous feedback forms, and finally decipher the winner, who will be the B&B owner/s with the highest percentage of their costs paid. The winning B&B owner gets a plaque as that week's best value for money B&B. This process is presented on air throughout one week, or five thirty-minute episodes. Thereafter, new sets of B&B owners take part and the process is repeated again and again according to the number of episodes in the series.

== Episodes summary ==
Key:

- In the visits section, where an N/A is shown, this denotes to when a B&B owner could not take part in the usual process as it was their own B&B.
- The payment was paid in full.
- The payment received was more than that of the asking price of the room.
- The payment received was less than that of the asking price of the room.

=== Episodes 1-5 ===
==== B&B owners ====
Name(s)	Relationship	Owner(s) of	Location of B&B	B&B rating	Total Bill (%) paid	Finish
Diane Lowe & Sandra Wade	Friends	Grassington Lodge	North Yorkshire	$\bigstar\bigstar\bigstar\bigstar\bigstar$	97%	1st Place
Hugh Bugbie	Single	Edenmore Guest House	Ardrossan, Ayrshire		96%	2nd Place
Ian & Ellie Betchley	Married couple	George & Dragon	Princess Risborough	$\bigstar\bigstar\bigstar\bigstar$	96%	2nd Place
Jeanette & Andrew Collett	Married couple	Manor Farm	Oxfordshire		90%	3rd Place

==== Visits ====
===== Edenmore Guest House =====
- Activity: Curling
- Restaurant Location: Edenmore Guest House

Name(s)	Comments	Would you stay again?	Payment
Hugh	—N/a		
Diane & Sandra	Light and airy £65 room was nice, though very small. There was no dust, however the exterior wasn't up to scratch, what with the pair picking up on a random "rusty pole" laying outside the B&B, and there wasn't enough toiletries provided, such as a shower cap. The restaurant meal was nice, as Diane thought she was funnily developing a crush on Andrew. Breakfast wasn't a winner; Sandra said that she wouldn't even have served what she was given.		£60 (-£5)
Ian & Ellie	Looks better on the inside than on the outside: whilst the outside wasn't the "castle" Ellie had hoped for, the inside of their £65 room was clean and modern. However, Ian found the shower too small and the headboards too flimsy. Sleeping was a problem due to the traffic noise. Breakfast was very nice and the portion sizes were just right. At the restaurant the duo felt disconnected with Jeanette and Andrew though Hugh helped relieve the tension and was a good, friendly host in their eyes as a result.		£57.50 (-£7.50)
Jeanette & Andrew	Jeanette was relieved to discover the interior was far nicer than what she thought, after seeing the exterior. They had no problems with the room whatsoever, and breakfast was nice. Traffic was a bit of problem when trying to sleep for the pair, and they found it inconvenient to go between the three buildings of the B&B just to sit down to breakfast. Hugh was a likeable host. They felt that the room being £65 was very good value for money.		£70 (+£5)

===== Grassington Lodge =====
- Activity: Cake making
- Restaurant Location: A local hotel

Name(s)	Comments	Would you stay again?	Payment
Hugh	Hugh said his £115 room was very posh, alike the two hosts, which he didn't particularly like. Hugh didn't appreciate the amount of cushions nor did he appreciate the amount of room he had to take a shower. At dinner, Hugh didn't like the celebrity name-dropping by the two hosts at dinner, nor did he like Diane popping in and out as hostess at breakfast the following day. He wrote this down in his anonymous feedback form which Diane saw.		£100 (-£15)
Diane & Sandra	—N/a		
Ian & Ellie	Ellie and Ian both called the room "very nice", but also expensive, at £135 per night. The pair soon caught on to the fact Daniel Radcliffe had stayed in their room when they noticed a piece of memorabilia taken from his visit. At the activity, the pair clashed when they were put on the same team as Andrew and Jeanette, and the cake they made came out wrong, to the disgust of Jeanette. They did enjoy it though, especially as Angela Baker was a judge. At dinner, divisions were reinforced. Come the morning, Ian commented that he slept well. The breakfast was very nice for Ian and Ellie, as it was for everybody.		£135 (+£0)
Jeanette & Andrew	Jeanette thought the B&B itself would be a five star establishment, and she turned out to be right. She and Andrew were in awe at their £125 room, though Jeanette was disappointed that there was no bath. Andrew jokingly counted nine double socket plugs, which he seemed a little fussy about. Jeanette and Andrew did not enjoy the activity, after having been put on a team with Ian & Ellie.		£130 (+£5)

===== Manor Farm =====
- Activity: Crocodile feeding
- Restaurant Location: Manor Farm

Name(s)	Comments	Would you stay again?	Payment
Hugh	Hugh was impressed by the £85 room itself but said that the bathroom was too small. At dinner, again, Hugh didn't enjoy much of the conversation — this time about marriage. At breakfast, Hugh didn't like Andrew and Jeanette being in the same room cooking and serving his food and neither did Ian & Ellie like this.		£75 (-£10)
Diane & Sandra	The £85 room was very nice and there wasn't a trace of dust for them to see, though Diane commented that the toilet was too small and that the toiletries offered were limited for her. Sandra and Diane were a little reserved about the activity. Diane said that she wasn't going to make a special effort with Hugh after his comments about her being snobbish at the previous visit seemed not to be forgotten; she later mentioned it at dinner.		£85 (+£0)
Ian & Ellie	It was an elegant £85 room they said, but far too quiet for their louder personalities. They didn't appreciate taking off their shoes upon entry, and felt everything was too homely. They did, however, very much enjoy feeding the crocodiles and bonded with Andrew more as he began to show his more mischievous side. Their bond continued to strengthen when Andrew revealed he was adopted to everyone at the dinner table. The pair thought their breakfast was in some places overcooked.		£70 (-£15)
Jeanette & Andrew	—N/a		

===== George & Dragon =====
- Activity: Paranormal investigation
- Restaurant Location: George & Dragon

Name(s)	Comments	Would you stay again?	Payment
Hugh	Hugh's first comment about his £82.50 room was that the bed had towels on it — something he didn't like. Hugh said he preferred mugs to the cups that were on offer. He didn't seem to enjoy the day's activity that much. Although at dinner Hugh was the life of the party, as he pretended to be gay in order to steer the conversation clear of any sob stories. The portion sizes were a bit too big according to Hugh.		£75 (-£7.50)
Diane & Sandra	Diane and Sandra said they were expecting some faux fur and they found some on the bed which they joked about, but they did seem to like their room, worth £87.50 per night. They commented the room was a reasonable size but they didn't find a wide offering of coffee sachets and they found the teapot to be stained. At the day's activity, whilst Sandra said she was anticipating it happily, Diane said she wasn't. Hugh played a trick on her, which was the only thing lightening the day up. At breakfast, they said the portion sizes were far too big, that their eggs were rubbery and their muffins were a disaster.		£83 (-£4.50)
Ian & Ellie	—N/a		
Jeanette & Andrew	Jeanette was initially speechless at the £82.50 room she and Andrew were given. The coat rail was in the bathroom, something Andrew did not see as practical. The couple sat out of the day's activity because they did not feel comfortable taking part in it. Andrew said it was contrary to his beliefs. At dinner, they heard Ian & Ellie share with them that they felt much closer to them now — and both Ellie and Jeanette cried as they realised they felt the same. Jeanette was unhappy with the bedding after the night's sleep she had. Andrew and Jeanette finally wrote that breakfast was amazing.		£85 (+£2.50)
