= The Vendetta Tapes =

Soundtrack album by John Baker
- Released: 25 September 2015
- Genre: Electronic music
- Length: 49:34
- Label: Buried Treasure Records
- Producer: Alan Gubby

BBC Radiophonic Workshop chronology
| Radiophonic Workshop (2014) | The Vendetta Tapes (2015) | Burials In Several Earths (2017) |

John Baker chronology
| The John Baker Tapes (2008) | The Vendetta Tapes |

The Vendetta Tapes is a 2015 album of incidental music from the 1960s BBC television series Vendetta. It also includes other pieces from the BBC Radiophonic Workshop library that would not fit on The John Baker Tapes (tracks 22–36). It was mastered by Mark Ayres.

== Track listing ==
All tracks are written by John Baker, except where noted

| No. | Title | Length |
|---|---|---|
| 1. | "The Sugar Man (Cue 2)" | 0:38 |
| 2. | "The Sugar Man (Cue 3)" | 3:35 |
| 3. | "The Sugar Man (Cue 5)" | 0:27 |
| 4. | "The Sugar Man (Cue 7)" | 2:03 |
| 5. | "The Sugar Man (Cue 9)" | 0:29 |
| 6. | "The Sugar Man (Cue 15)" | 1:44 |
| 7. | "The Sugar Man (Cue 17)" | 0:33 |
| 8. | "The Dolly Man (Cue 1)" | 1:06 |
| 9. | "The Dolly Man (Cue 2)" | 2:26 |
| 10. | "The Dolly Man (Cue 3)" | 1:41 |
| 11. | "The Ice Cream Man (Cue 1)" | 0:38 |
| 12. | "The Ice Cream Man (Cue 7)" | 0:50 |
| 13. | "The Ice Cream Man (Cue 13)" | 0:14 |
| 14. | "The Ice Cream Man (Cue 15)" | 2:07 |
| 15. | "The Ice Cream Man (Cue 1A)" | 2:05 |
| 16. | "The Ice Cream Man (Cue 2A)" | 0:48 |
| 17. | "The Ice Cream Man (Cue 4A)" | 1:27 |
| 18. | "The Ice Cream Man (Cue 10A)" | 1:43 |
| 19. | "The Ice Cream Man (Cue 18A)" | 1:22 |
| 20. | "The Widow Man (Cue 8)" | 0:28 |
| 21. | "The Widow Man (Cue 9)" | 0:56 |
| 22. | "The Caves Of Steel - RQ1 (Music)" | 1:10 |
| 23. | "The Caves Of Steel - RQ9 (Music)" | 0:22 |
| 24. | "The Caves Of Steel - RQ11 (Mono - Stop T/O)" | 0:36 |
| 25. | "The Locusts: Plagues Of Man (Cue 9)" (Dick Mills) | 1:31 |
| 26. | "Orbit" | 0:44 |
| 27. | "The Lively Mind" | 0:21 |
| 28. | "Suivez La Piste (Cue 3)" | 1:43 |
| 29. | "Suivez La Piste (Cue 5)" | 0:58 |
| 30. | "Suivez La Piste (Cue 8)" | 0:49 |
| 31. | "COI Technology Pavilion" | 9:32 |
| 32. | "The Tape Recorder (Cue 1)" | 1:11 |
| 33. | "The Tape Recorder (Cue 2)" | 0:51 |
| 34. | "The Tape Recorder (Cue 4)" | 0:21 |
| 35. | "Computers In Business" | 0:50 |
| 36. | "Man Alive: UFO" (Arranged by John Baker, composed by Tony Hatch) | 1:15 |

== Bibliography ==
- The Vendetta Tapes (booklet). Buried Treasure Records. 2015. BUTR8.
