= Dawn of the Dead (soundtracks) =

Album by Goblin

Various releases of the music to Dawn of the Dead were released.

== Zombi by Goblin ==
Zombi (Dawn Of The Dead) Original Soundtrack

Soundtrack album by Goblin
- Released: 1978
- Recorded: 1978
- Genres: Progressive rock Film score
- Length: 51:47
- Labels: King Japan; Cinevox

The original score for the film was recorded by long-time Dario Argento collaborators Goblin. Although the score features heavily in the European cut of the film (Argento's Zombi cut), it is used along with stock music in other edits.

=== Track listing ===
1. "L'alba Dei Morti Viventi" ("The Dawn of the Living Dead") 6:04
2. "Zombi" ("Zombies") 4:24
3. "Safari" ("Safari") 2:11
4. "Torte In Faccia" ("Pie in the Face") 1:57
5. "Ai Margini Della Follia" ("At the Margins of Madness") 1:32
6. "Zaratozom" ("Zaratozom") 3:36
7. "La Caccia" ("The Hunt") 3:38
8. "Tirassegno" ("Dartboard") 2:51
9. "Oblio" ("Oblivion") 5:13
10. "Risveglio" ("Awakening") 1:04

=== Track listing with bonus tracks ===
1. "L'alba Dei Morti Viventi" ("The Dawn of the Living Dead") 6:04
2. "Zombi" ("Zombies") 4:24
3. "Safari" ("Safari") 2:11
4. "Torte In Faccia" ("Pie in the Face") 1:57
5. "Ai Margini Della Follia" ("At the Margins of Madness") 1:32
6. "Zaratozom" ("Zaratozom") 3:36
7. "La Caccia" ("The Hunt") 3:38
8. "Tirassegno" ("Dartboard") 2:51
9. "Oblio" ("Oblivion") 5:13
10. "Risveglio" ("Awakening") 1:04
11. "L'alba Dei Morti Viventi (Alternate Take)" [CD Bonus Track] 5:19
12. "Ai Margini Della Follia (Alternate Take)" [CD Bonus Track] 1:42
13. "Zombi (Sexy)" [CD Bonus Track] 2:20
14. "Ai Margini Della Follia (Alternate Take)" [CD Bonus Track] 3:37
15. "Zombi (Supermarket)" [CD Bonus Track] 3:13
16. "L'alba Dei Morti Viventi (Intro — Alternate Take)" [CD Bonus Track] 0:56
17. "Zombi (The Living Dead's Voices!)" [CD Bonus Track] 2:10

== Dawn of the Dead: The Unreleased Incidental Music ==
Dawn of the Dead: The Unreleased Incidental Music

Soundtrack album by Various artists
- Released: 2004
- Recorded: pre-1978
- Genres: Stock music Film score
- Length: 38:44
- Label: Trunk Records

Much of the music used in the film was licensed from the De Wolfe Music Library, a much-utilized source of stock music for film and TV projects. Although the Goblin score has been variously available since the film's release, it was not until 2004 that any of the 60-plus cues of library music used in the film were released on a compilation album from Trunk Records. In 2009, virtually all the cues used (actually 74 of a total 86 library music pieces) were researched, identified and catalogued by Robert McLaine, Darren Stuart, John Toman, Allen Lighthiser, Patrick J. Doody, Llyswen Vaughn and Chris Stavrakis, and published on the Dawn Of The Dead Ultimate Soundtrack website. The album included 'Cause I'm a Man' written by Cliff Twemlow and Peter Taylor under the pen name Peter Reno and recorded by the Pretty Things under the name "Electric Banana", and Herbert Chappell's 1965 composition "The Gonk" which plays over the final credits. The track is used in many references to the film including Shaun of the Dead and a variation (performed in chicken clucks) is used as the end theme to Robot Chicken. The early part of the tune to "The Gonk" was used in "The Ladies' Bras", a track by Jonny Trunk and Wisbey which, at only 36 seconds long, became the shortest ever UK top 40 single when it made number 27 on 30 September 2007. Shaun of the Dead opens with the track "Figment" which also features on the compilation. The album's cover is taken from a Belgian promotional poster for the film.

=== Track listing ===
1. Herbert Chappell — "The Gonk"
2. Paul Lemel — "Cosmogony Part 1"
3. Eric Towren — "Sinestre"
4. Electric Banana — "'Cause I'm A Man"
5. Simon Park — "Figment"
6. Jack Trombey — "Mask Of Death"
7. Derek Scott — "Scarey 1"
8. Derek Scott — "Scarey 2"
9. Jack Trombey — "Dark Earth"
10. Various — "Mall Montage Scene"
  1. Reg Tilsley — "We Are The Champions"
  2. Herbert Chappell — "Ragtime Razzamatazz"
  3. Barry Stoller — "Tango Tango"
  4. Derek Scott — "Fugarock"
11. Jack Trombey — "Barrage"
12. Pierre Arvay — "Desert De Glace"
13. Simon Park — "Sun High"
14. Paul Lemel — "Dramaturgy"

== George A. Romero's Dawn of the Dead ==
George A. Romero's Dawn of the Dead
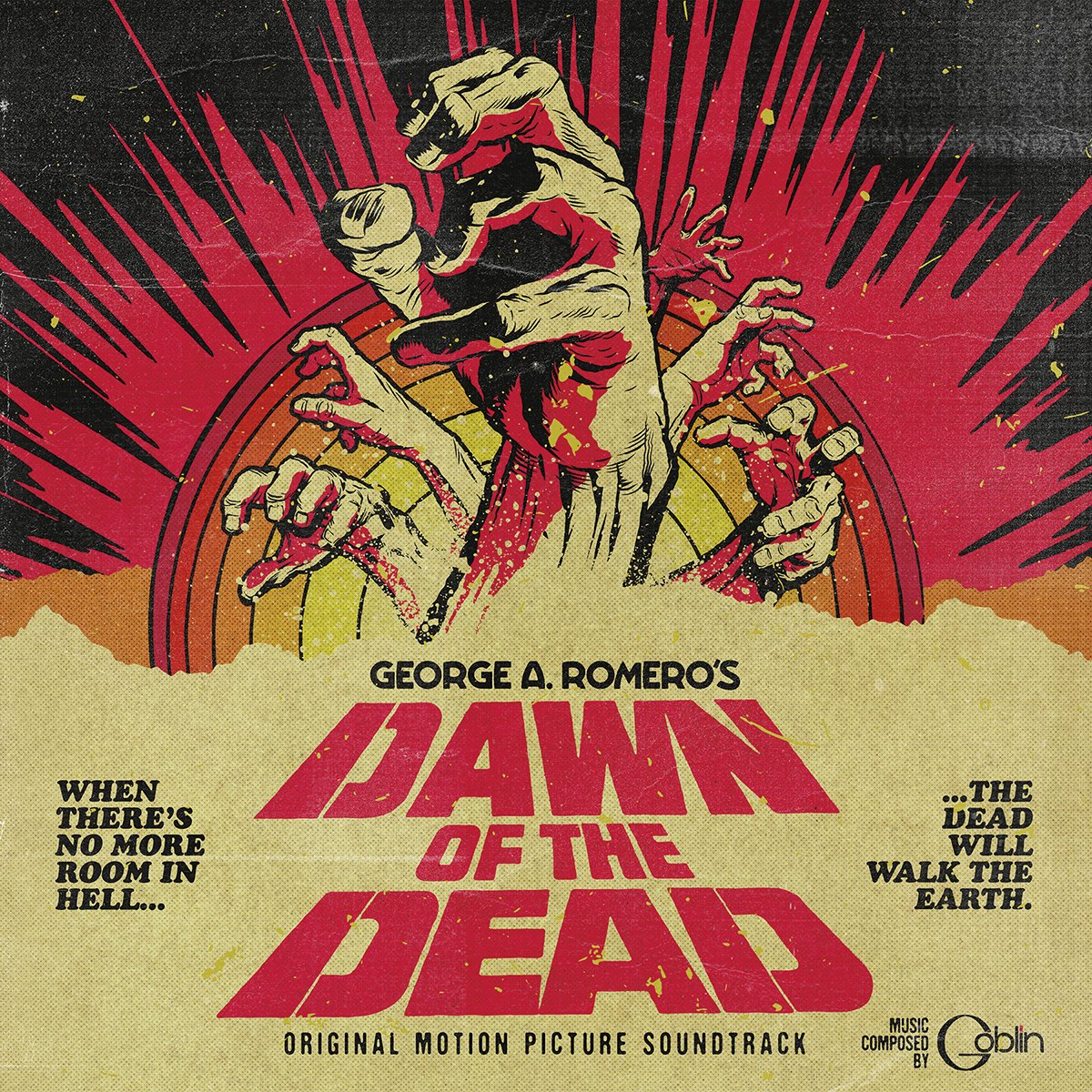
- Dawn of the Dead image cover

Soundtrack album by Goblin
- Released: 2018
- Recorded: pre-1978
- Genre: Film score
- Label: Waxwork Records

In 2018, Waxwork Records released a double LP soundtrack "George A. Romero's Dawn of the Dead," directed by Romero in collaboration with writer, Argento, and featured music composed by Goblin. Waxwork Record's vinyl release was the first to include Goblin's entire composition. Kevin Bergeron of Waxwork Records told Syfy Wire:

It took lots of patience and research to really pull this new Dawn Of The Dead soundtrack album off. We felt strongly that all of the unreleased Goblin material needed to be presented on vinyl, and we poured ourselves into releasing the best possible product for such an iconic and important movie. It was also very important for this soundtrack release to actually look like something that could have existed in 1978. With the talents of Brazilian illustrator, Butcher Billy, we think we've created something very special. We'd like to think Romero would be proud.

=== Track listing ===
1. "L'alba Dei Morti Viventi" ("The Dawn of the Living Dead") 6:04
2. "Zombi" ("Zombies") 4:24
3. "Safari" ("Safari") 2:11
4. "Torte In Faccia" ("Pie in the Face") 1:57
5. "Ai Margini Della Follia" ("At the Margins of Madness") 1:32
6. "Zaratozom" ("Zaratozom") 3:36
7. "La Caccia" ("The Hunt") 3:38
8. "Tirassegno" ("Dartboard") 2:51
9. "Oblio" ("Oblivion") 5:13
10. "Risveglio" ("Awakening") 1:04
11. "L'alba Dei Morti Viventi (Alternate Take)" [CD Bonus Track] 5:19
12. "Ai Margini Della Follia (Alternate Take)" [CD Bonus Track] 1:42
13. "Zombi (Sexy)" [CD Bonus Track] 2:20
14. "Ai Margini Della Follia (Alternate Take)" [CD Bonus Track] 3:37
15. "Zombi (Supermarket)" [CD Bonus Track] 3:13
16. "L'alba Dei Morti Viventi (Intro — Alternate Take)" [CD Bonus Track] 0:56
17. "Zombi (The Living Dead's Voices!)" [CD Bonus Track] 2:10
