= Varèse Sarabande =

American record label

- Parent company: Concord (until 2026); BMG Rights Management (since 2026)
- Founded: 1972 (as Varèse International); 1977 (as Varèse Sarabande)
- Founder: Tom Null; Chris Kuchler; Dub Taylor
- Distributors: Universal Music Distribution (worldwide distribution); Craft Recordings (reissues)
- Genre: Film scores Original cast recordings
- Country of origin: United States
- Location: Beverly Hills, California
- Official website: varesesarabande.com

Varèse Sarabande is an American record label, owned by BMG and distributed by Universal Music Group, which specializes in film scores and original cast recordings. It aims to reissue rare or unavailable albums, as well as newer releases by artists no longer under a contract. The label's name was derived from combining French-born composer Edgard Varèse's last name with the musical term sarabande, a slow Spanish dance.

As of September 2026, Varèse operates as a division of BMG's Craft Recordings label.

== History ==
Varèse Sarabande's roots trace back to 1972, with the introduction of a predecessor imprint called Varèse International. The first LP release was "Lumiere" by Dub Taylor. Varèse International Records was originally conceived as an avant garde classical label. In the years that followed, under the management of the founder–owners, Dub Taylor and Chris Kuchler, the label expanded its catalogue to include jazz, classical and other genres of recordings. In 1977, Tom Null's Sarabande Records merged with Varèse International to form Varèse Sarabande Records. The early LP issues of the label were reissues of classical recordings from the American Decca, Remington and JVC labels. The first film soundtrack LP album was released in 1978 though the advice of fledging Hollywood writer/director/actor Bruce Kimmel, who was offered an ownership but politely turned it down at that time and would return to head the label's Broadway division in the early 1990s. The labels' sudden success was mostly due to the soundtracks they released more so than their classical releases and eventually the label leaned heavily towards soundtrack releases many of which became best sellers for the label that included John Carpenter's Halloween, Goblin's Dawn of the Dead, Fred Myrow's Phantasm, five albums of the music from the classic TV series, The Twilight Zone, which were huge sellers and their still popular reissue of the music from the late George A. Romero's classic horror film, Night of the Living Dead. They still produced classical releases under the supervision of Null and even created an offshoot label named Andante, which didn't last long and was a variation of their classical releases on Varese just under that brand. Scot W. Holton was also a producer during the label's early years until his death.

Initially, the new label was located at 6404 Wilshire Boulevard in Los Angeles, later moving to 13006 Saticoy Street, North Hollywood, CA 91605, then 11846 Ventura Boulevard, Suite 130 Studio City, CA, 91604 and finally to Beverly Hills, CA once the label was acquired by Concord Music in 2018.

The label would become one of the largest producers of soundtrack releases on LP during the late 1970s and through the 1980s up until the Compact Disc format would appear in 1983. The label would eventually produce a handful of soundtrack releases on CD during the format's early stages as well as a dozen classical reissues from the LP counterparts. Starting from 1990 until now, the label would produce up to 50 new soundtrack releases per year and would create a vast library soundtrack releases which was far more than any other record label would produce in a yearly period. In the early 1990s, the classical division was virtually eliminated for a new division devoted to Broadway Shows as well as Cabaret and Show Tune albums by popular and respected Broadway artists, which would also dominate the genre throughout the 1990s. In 2003, Varèse celebrated the label's 25th anniversary by releasing two 4-CD compilation sets dedicated the releases produced by the label up to that point. Additionally two more 4-CD sets were released in 2008 to celebrate its 30th anniversary and 2013 to celebrate its 35th anniversary. Finally, in 2018 the label produced a modest 2-CD set to celebrate its 40th anniversary milestone for the label and would be the last for longtime producer and executive Robert Townson, who had run the label from 1989 until early 2019 whose final release was fittingly, Jerry Goldsmith's Raggedy Man reissue for the Varese Club.

Presently, Varèse continues to release new music and re-issues of its vast catalog of owned and licensed material. A commercial website dedicated to Varèse Sarabande releases can be found at VareseSarabande.com. The Varèse CD Club is their signature line dedicated to unreleased and/or expanded versions of classic soundtracks. All CD Club titles are limited edition and are usually available for purchase via the Varèse site as well as their current and older releases through them as well as other soundtrack retailers.

== Colosseum Schallplatten ==
This German record label (based in Nuremberg) was Varèse Sarabande's European equivalent which marketed most Varèse Sarabande titles overseas and had done so since the inception of the 47000 CD series. The initial Varèse CDs sold in Europe were either imported from Varèse or pressed by Colosseum using JVC disc technology. Varèse pressed CDs featured a solid black design, while the Colosseum pressings had the same designs printed in outline red. Thus each label could print titles independently, and many Varèse titles that went out of print in the US were sometimes available from Colosseum.

After 1989, Colosseum made several CD pressings that were exclusive to Europe and, because of their connection to Varèse, were given a VSD catalogue number. Presently, Colosseum had expanded their output with their own series of releases apart from the Varèse line, with CVS replacing VSD on specific European pressings of new Varèse titles. Some VSD listings were occasionally visible on certain reissues and exclusive digital downloads.

The label was also the exclusive distributor of Varèse Club titles in Europe and occasionally had titles available long after they sold out in the United States.

The label has ceased operations as of late 2015.

== Soundtrack Listeners Communications (SLCS) ==
From 1990 through 1997, Varèse Sarabande licensed their releases vintage and current to Soundtrack Listeners Communications (SLCS for short) in Japan through this label run by Yashiro Wada. The label specialized in releasing soundtracks that have never been on CD before as well as reissuing out-of-print titles that were on CD as well LP that has been in demand by collectors. They had a special limited edition Club called SLCS Club which was somewhat similar to Varese's US club that issued soundtracks from other labels such as RCA/Victor and many others as limited editions but were not numbered like Varese's were at the time. Yet, only up to 1000 copies were produced which included John Williams's "Space Camp", Henry Mancini's "Return of The Pink Panther" and "Two For The Road" and Dave Grusin's "Three Days of The Condor." Many came with an OBI Strip, a paper that wrapped around the side of the CD case containing information on the release in Japanese with the title and date of release as well as the price in Japanese Yen currency. These strips are very popular amongst soundtrack collectors and particular, their older releases. Most titles contained a fold out booklet or a regular sized booklet with liner notes in Japanese pertaining to the title and the composer.

Their versions of Varese's releases utilized the US poster artwork as well much improved artwork in a lot of cases to distinguish themselves from their US counterparts. However, the music was identical to that of the original US releases and were never expanded in any way unless Varese themselves expanded the title. They also released soundtracks from Varese's LP catalogue that were exclusive for the Japanese market which included Joseph LoDuca's "Evil Dead/Evil Dead 2", John Harrison's "Creepshow" and David Mansfield's " Year of the Dragon". They also produced a compilation set dedicated to Oscar Winner Jerry Goldsmith called "Jerry's Recall" amongst these special releases not available in the US.

These releases were made available through imports in the US for double the price of a regular US priced disc averaging from thirty to forty dollars per disc for a single disc release, and much more for multi-disc sets.

The label ceased operations in 1997.

== Volcano Records ==
After Soundtrack Listeners Communications (SLCS) ceased their operations, Varese made a new Japanese distribution deal with Volcano Records for a short period of time starting in 1998. The label was more broad in that they did not just specialize in just soundtrack releases like SLCS did when they were in operation. They however still followed a similar protocol to SLCS in releasing Varese's US releases often with superior artwork and at times, better sound quality. They also exclusively released titles such as a nearly complete "Lionheart" soundtrack by Oscar Winner Jerry Goldsmith, that had been released by the label in two separate CD volume releases in 1987 and a condensed single release in 1994, which was incomplete.

The label would eventually cease operations around 2001.

== See also ==
- List of Varèse Sarabande albums
