= SIFL =

SIFL or Sifl may refer to:

- Sifl, a character from The Sifl and Olly Show
- Southern Indoor Football League
