= Burials in Several Earths =

Studio album by Radiophonic Workshop
- Released: 19 May 2017
- Studio: Musique concrète; experimental; electronica; sound collage
- Genre: Electronic
- Length: 81:26
- Label: Room 13

Radiophonic Workshop chronology
The Vendetta Tapes (2015)	Burials in Several Earths (2017)	Everything You Can Imagine Is Real (2017)

Burials in Several Earths is a 2017 album of recordings created by the Radiophonic Workshop, released on 19 May 2017. It marks the first official studio album since 1985's Doctor Who: The Music II.

Unusually for the group, the album was mostly recorded live, with minimal editing, and contains five suites. Each track name was taken from Sir Francis Bacon's unfinished novel New Atlantis, a segment of which was framed in the workshop by late member Daphne Oram for being a "morale booster". The album features appearances from Martyn Ware and engineer Steve 'Dub' Jones.

== Critical reception ==
Professional ratings
Aggregate scores
Source	Rating
Metacritic	72/100
Review scores
Source	Rating
Clash	6/10
Classic Rock	3/5 stars
Louder Than War	9/10
Mojo	3/5 stars
Record Collector	3/5 stars
Uncut	4/5 stars
The Wire	4/5 stars

At Metacritic, which assigns a normalized rating out of 100 to reviews from mainstream publications, Burials in Several Earths has received an average score of 72, based on seven reviews, indicating "generally favorable reviews".

Ioan of Louder Than War was impressed and perplexed by "the width and breadth of experimentation and ability to take oneself off to different planes" across the record, and deemed the workshop to be "truly pioneers of soundscapes and effects, and everyone else simply paddles in their wake." The Quietus writer Euan Andrews wrote that the album "chimes with a clarity and freshness reminiscent of Cluster at their most benevolently aqueous and formless", and wrote that the record's filtered ambient waves, broken piano patterns and David Gilmour-esque guitar wails "are clearly intended to demonstrate the Workshop's abilities once freed from their duty as public servants to provide memorable themes." Jo Kendall, writing for Classic Rock, considered the record to be "an interstellar, improvised synth par-tay", and added that while parts of "Things Buried in Water 1" and "The Stranger's House" hint at melody, the record is otherwise "an offbeat, thrumming sound collage".

Joe Rivers of Clash wrote that the album's suites bear "a touching humanity", but considered the record hard "to get your teeth into" and questioned its place in the Workshop's legacy. He added: "As a musique concrète or experimental electronica album, Burials in Several Earths is an above average attempt that contains myriad intricacies and points of interest. As something to carry on a peerless lineage, however, it feels like an unnecessary move." Inky Tuscadero of Record Collector wrote that while many of the Workshop's finest pieces historically were born from improvising within their limitations, Burials in Several Earths instead uses improvisation via a "let's-just-cast-ourselves-adrift-and-see-where-we-end-up approach", resulting in a "prosaic" album. He added: "Without anything to rein them in, these pieces have a tendency to drift, suggesting that a tighter remit, or more judicious editing, might have had more gravitational pull." Mojo described the album as "appropriately cinematic and evocative".

== Track listing ==
Disc one
No.	Title	Length
1.	"Burials in Several Earths"	18:58
2.	"Things Buried in Water"	22:01

Disc two
No.	Title	Length
1.	"Some Hope of Land"	25:15
2.	"Not Come to Light"	3:58
3.	"The Strangers' House"	11:23

== Personnel ==
Adapted from the liner notes of Burials in Several Earths

- The Radiophonic Workshop – producer
- Martyn Ware – composer
- Paddy Kingsland – composer
- Steve Jones – composer
- Mark Ayres – composer, mixer
- Patrick Collier – engineer
- Noel Summerville – mastering
