= Fake Songs =

Studio album by Liam Lynch
- Released: April 1, 2003
- Recorded: Various times
- Studio: Liam Lynch's home studio
- Genre: Comedy rock
- Length: 36:57
- Label: S-Curve
- Producer: Liam Lynch

Liam Lynch chronology
We're All Nighters (2002)	Fake Songs (2003)	How To Be A Satellite (2006)

Singles from Fake Songs
- 1. "United States of Whatever" Released: November 25, 2002; 2. "Still Wasted from the Party Last Night" Released: 2003

Fake Songs is the third studio album by American musician Liam Lynch, released on April 1, 2003 through S-Curve Records and distributed worldwide by Capitol Records. The album is known for featuring his best-known song "United States of Whatever", which was released as a single in 2002. The album features a bonus DVD that compiles two-hours of various shorts and skits created by Lynch in his home studio.

An early version of the album, containing an alternative track list with songs unique to that version, was released in 2000 through Lynch's 111 Productions imprint.

== Background and recording ==
During the first two seasons of Liam Lynch's show The Sifl and Olly Show, Lynch wrote and recorded comedic tracks, some of which not only appearing on Fake Songs but even being featured on the show itself, such as "United States of Whatever". The track was featured on a sampler album, where fans ripped the song and burned CD-R copies of it. One burned disc eventually got into the hands of the Los Angeles radio station KROQ, in which the track grew in popularity through repeated requests. Lynch would soon give Global Warming Records the right to release the track as a single in the UK in 2002. The sudden popularity of the single resulted in Lynch getting a one-album deal with S-Curve Records.

== Song information ==
As the title suggests, some songs on this record are parodies of specific artists. Liam describes these songs as being "musical caricatures". The tracks "Try Me" and "Cuz You Do" (previously released on Liam's 2002 album We're All Nighters) were re-recorded for this album, featuring Ringo Starr, of The Beatles fame, on drums. The track "Rock and Roll Whore" is a duet song between Lynch and Jack Black of Tenacious D, a band with whom Lynch is friends. Lynch also directed the music video for the band's music video for their song "Tribute" as well as their 2006 feature-length film Tenacious D in The Pick of Destiny. "Electrician's Day" was taken from Lynch's 2000 comedy album History of America? with Matt Crocco, creator of The Sifl and Olly Show.

=== Other "Fake Songs" ===
Four other post-Fake Songs parodies by Liam Lynch are known to exist. They are as follows:

- "Fake White Stripes Song" - 2:49
- "Fake Beatles Song" - 1:41
- "Fake Dylan Melody" - 2:13
- "Fake Dylan - Gears of Wear" - 1:13

Both of the fake Bob Dylan songs have been featured on his Podcast, Lynchland, along with appearing on the corresponding album, More Songs From Lynchland. "Fake Beatles Song" was never actually meant to be part of the collection of fake songs. Liam had made the song with intent of showing it to Beatles cover band, The Fab Four so that when they played it live, the audience would think it was a never before heard song by The Beatles.

== Marketing ==
A music video was produced for the album's lead single "United States of Whatever". Lynch was invited to perform the track on the British TV show Top of the Pops, however was unable to attend the show, so instead he produced a music video for the show to use instead in a single day. A second single, released as a promo, was made of the track "Still Wasted from the Party Last Night" in 2003. The single was released with little to no airplay and did not initially have a video produced for it. A video was eventually produced years later for Lynch's online podcast Lynchland.

With the exception of a few live TV show performances, Lynch did not tour to support the album. According to Lynch, S-Curve did offer him a budget to use for touring, however he instead ask them to use the budget to produce short television commercials for the album as well as package the album with the Fake Movies bonus DVD.

== Reception ==
Professional ratings
Aggregate scores
Source	Rating
Metacritic	52/100
Review scores
Source	Rating
AllMusic	4/5 stars
Entertainment Weekly	C−
The Guardian	4/5 stars
Mojo	3.5/5 stars
Now	4/5 stars
Pitchfork	7.3/10
Q	1.5/5 stars
Rolling Stone	4/5 stars
Stylus	3.2/10
Uncut	4/10

Fake Songs has received mixed reviews. On the review aggregate site Metacritic, the album has a score of 52 out of 100, indicating "Mixed or average reviews." Some critics praised the album's humor, while others criticized it. MacKenzie Wilson of Allmusic stated that the album "is a hilarious effort loaded with satirical song parodies and rock n' roll spoofs" and gave the record a 4 out of 5 rating. Ink19 writer Aaron Shaul on the other hand found the humor to be flat and also criticized the use of non-comedic songs (such as "Try Me") and the Fake Movies bonus DVD.

== Track listing ==
All tracks are written by Liam Lynch.

No.	Title	Length
1.	"SOS"	2:19
2.	"United States of Whatever"	1:29
3.	"Fake Björk Song"	2:21
4.	"Still Wasted from the Party Last Night"	1:56
5.	"Cuz You Do"	2:22
6.	"I'm All Bloody Inside"	1:15
7.	"Electrician's Day"	2:15
8.	"Rapbot"	1:16
9.	"Fake David Bowie Song"	1:32
10.	"Rock and Roll Whore"	1:55
11.	"Sugar Walkin"	1:30
12.	"Fake Pixies Song"	1:43
13.	"Happy"	0:59
14.	"Well Hung"	1:53
15.	"Fake Depeche Mode Song"	1:35
16.	"Try Me"	2:09
17.	"Vulture's Song"	2:33
18.	"Horny Kind of Love"	1:40
19.	"Fake Talking Heads Song"	2:29
20.	"Sir Track"	1:35
Total length:		36:57

== Personnel ==
- Liam Lynch - performance, recording, production, mixing, design
- Jennifer Robbins - design
- Bruce Sugar - engineering
- Brian Hardin - mixing
- Allen Scott - photography
- Jack Black - vocals on "Rock and Roll Whore"
- Ringo Starr - drums on "Try Me" and "Cuz You Do"
