= ALIBI Music =

Production music company

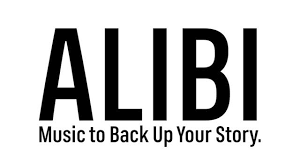
- Industry: Music; advertising; film; broadcast
- Founded: 2011
- Founder: Jonathan Parks
- Services: Music licensing; original music production; sound design; music composition; sync licensing
- Website: alibimusic.com

ALIBI Music, founded in 2011 by Jonathan Parks, is a production music company that provides music and sound effects for license in film, television, advertising, trailers, promos, video games. As of September 2023, ALIBI works with about 350 composers and artists whose work is included in its music library.

== Stems and Alt Versions ==
In addition to licensing individual music tracks, ALIBI's library includes stems and alternative versions.

== ALIBI Music Extension for Adobe Premiere Pro ==
In March 2021, ALIBI Music launched an extension panel for Adobe Premiere Pro. The company has since then published an update of its extension.
