= Four in a Bed =

British reality TV series (2010–)

- Also known as: Three in a Bed
- Genre: Reality
- Voices of: Three in a Bed; Stephen Mangan (2010–11); Roger Allam (2015–16); Four in a Bed; Mike Adams (2010–15); Duncan Wisbey (2015–)
- Country of origin: United Kingdom
- Original language: English
- No. of series: 3 (Three in a Bed); 18 (Four in a Bed)
- No. of episodes: 32 (Three in a Bed); 1,115 (Four in a Bed)

Production
- Running time: 60 minutes (Three in a Bed); 30 minutes (Four in a Bed)
- Production company: Studio Lambert

Original release
- Network: Channel 4
- Release: 21 April 2010 – present

Related
- The Great B&B Challenge

Four in a Bed (also known as Three in a Bed) is a British reality television game show that has been airing on Channel 4 since 21 April 2010. The show involves bed and breakfast (B&B) owners, who take turns to stay with one another and pay what they consider fair for their stay after giving feedback. The winner is the establishment named the best value for money. Each group consists of four B&B owners visiting each other, and thus a winner is declared every five episodes in an episode called 'Payment Day'.

== Format ==
Each pair of bed and breakfast (B&B) owners (or single owner, in some cases) visits each other's B&B. At the start of their visit, they are told how much their room costs and if there are any separate charges for breakfast. The owners then inspect the room, picking up on anything untidy or out of place. Afterwards, they take turns in some sort of entertainment activity where there is usually a mini-competition. The host then takes the guests to dinner or drinks, where the guests usually get to know the backstory of how the host entered into their business in the first place. Everyone then goes to bed. Upon waking up in the morning, they then have breakfast, usually all together. Finally, they each fill in an anonymous feedback form rating and commenting on five aspects of the B&B – Hosting (e.g. friendliness, professionalism); Cleanliness; Facilities (e.g. room layout, furnishings, decoration, shared/private bathroom, room extras like snacks); Sleep quality (e.g. bed size and comfort, noise, temperature); and Breakfast (quality, choice, service etc.), before saying if they would stay there again. The B&B owners get to see their feedback once the guests have gone, which can leave them feeling slightly vengeful if they feel aggrieved by the comments. The guests also pay an amount of money based on their perceived value of the B&B – if a guest believes it was not worth the money, they underpay. If they think it was worth the money, they pay exactly. On rare occasions, guests have paid more than the stated cost of the B&B, particularly if they felt the establishment was very good. The payment amounts are all kept secret until the last episode of the week.

After all four B&Bs have been visited, the hosts get together to confront each other about the comments and the payments they have received. The winner is revealed at the end, being the B&B that has received the highest percentage of what they charged: a B&B charging £80 and receiving payment in full from each of the others would win over one charging £130 which received £125 from each of the others.

On occasion, one of the teams may drop out midway through the competition (e.g. due to illness). In such cases where they are unable to finish the competition, they will not receive their payments from other hosts (if they hosted before leaving) and vice versa (if they visited other hosts before leaving). For hosts with two members, the absence of one will allow the other to continue in the competition as normal.

=== Three in a Bed differences ===
The format for Three in A Bed slightly differs from Four in a Bed in certain aspects. First, all three B&Bs are visited in one episode. Consequently, each episode lasts for one hour, including advertisements. The order of the entertainment and dinner (occasionally lunch) meal were interchangeable. Third, for series 1 and 2, the feedback was orally given to hosts immediately at the end of each stay. In series 3, the feedback was written in a guestbook and was more free-flowing compared to Four in A Bed's anonymous feedback forms where the rivals had to focus on several areas. Additionally, for series 1, the payments were also revealed at the end of each stay.

== Transmissions ==
=== Three in a Bed ===
Series	Start date	End date	Episodes
1	21 April 2010	17 June 2010	8
2	31 March 2011	2 June 2011	10
3	18 March 2015	18 March 2016	14

=== Four in a Bed ===
Series	Start date	End date	Episodes
1	22 November 2010	17 December 2010	20
2	30 May 2011	8 July 2011	60
2	24 October 2011	2 December 2011	60
3	12 March 2012	20 April 2012	60
3	18 June 2012	27 July 2012	60
4	7 January 2013	1 March 2013	40
5	30 September 2013	20 December 2013	60
6	10 March 2014	4 April 2014	40
6	5 May 2014	30 May 2014	40
7	29 September 2014	24 October 2014	60
7	16 February 2015	10 April 2015	60
8	21 September 2015	20 November 2015	50
8	11 April 2016	15 April 2016	50
9	4 April 2016	8 April 2016	50
9	18 April 2016	24 June 2016	50
10	3 October 2016	9 December 2016	100
10	1 May 2017	7 July 2017	100
11	9 October 2017	1 December 2017	75
11	15 January 2018	2 March 2018	75
12	17 September 2018	9 November 2018	75
12	11 March 2019	26 April 2019	75
13	30 September 2019	1 November 2019	45
13	9 March 2020	3 April 2020	45
14	6 April 2020	17 April 2020	45
14	15 June 2020	10 July 2020	45
14	12 October 2020	30 October 2020	45
15	2 November 2020	13 November 2020	90
15	1 March 2021	23 April 2021	90
15	13 September 2021	5 November 2021	90
16	8 November 2021	19 November 2021	90
16	31 January 2022	1 April 2022	90
16	7 May 2022		90
16	3 October 2022	28 October 2022	90
16	6 February 2023	17 February 2023	90
17	20 February 2023	7 April 2023	80
17	25 September 2023	10 November 2023	80
17	15 April 2024	26 April 2024	80
18	29 April 2024	7 June 2024	75
18	21 October 2024	20 December 2024	75
19	5 February 2025	28 March 2025	80
19	15 September 2025	24 October 2025	80
19	23 March 2026	27 March 2026	80
19	TBD	TBD	80
20	23 February 2026	20 March 2026	TBD
20	30 March 2026	3 April 2026	TBD
20	TBD	TBD	TBD

== International versions ==
A French version of the series, called Bienvenue chez nous, began airing on France's TF1 on 30 January 2012.

A Dutch version of Three in a Bed, called Bed & Breakfast, began airing on NPO 1 on 27 April 2012.

== Controversies ==
In February 2013, some business owners who participated in Four in a Bed sought legal help after receiving abuse from the public. In the most extreme case, police were called in to investigate abuse that included the sending of excrement through the post and threats of physical violence. Other businesses and owners claim to have suffered abuse via the placing of alleged fake reviews on TripAdvisor, e-mails, phone calls and letters.
