= Matt Crocco =

American composer and musician

Matt Crocco, born March 18, 1971 (age 55), is a musician, writer, and producer. He co-created, composed music for, directed and produced MTV's Sifl and Olly Show.

Crocco also composed music for MTV animated series Clone High and also for ESPN Classic show "Cheap Seats" as well as music cues for the Cartoon Network film "Re-animated".

Crocco also appears as a regular in Liam Lynch's Podcast, Lynchland. Playing original characters and co-writing songs with Lynch that can be found at Liamlynch.net.

Crocco is part of the band Black on Sunshine that toured England in 2005. A powerpop four-piece group with sounds of early Pink Floyd with a current guitar rock vibe. Crocco plays keyboards and percussion as well as sings some of the songs and adds backing vocals as well.
