= A Minecraft Movie (soundtrack) =

2025 soundtrack album by Mark Mothersbaugh

A Minecraft Movie (Original Motion Picture Soundtrack)

Soundtrack album by Mark Mothersbaugh and various artists
- Released: March 28, 2025
- Recorded: 2024–2025
- Studios: Michael Fowler Centre, Wellington; Park Road Post, Wellington; Noise Alchemy Studio, Burbank, California
- Length: 74:09
- Label: WaterTower Music
- Producer: Mark Mothersbaugh

Mark Mothersbaugh chronology
The World According to Allee Willis (2024)	A Minecraft Movie (2025)	Hoppers (2026)

Singles from A Minecraft Movie (Original Motion Picture Soundtrack)
- 1. "I Feel Alive" Released: March 19, 2025

A Minecraft Movie (Original Motion Picture Soundtrack) is the soundtrack album to the 2025 film A Minecraft Movie based on the 2011 video game Minecraft by Mojang Studios. Directed by Jared Hess, the film stars Jason Momoa, Jack Black, Emma Myers, Danielle Brooks, Sebastian Hansen, and Jennifer Coolidge.

The soundtrack featuring the film's original score was composed by Mark Mothersbaugh (Note: Original Minecraft themes by C418 and Lena Raine.) and incorporated songs, was released on March 28, 2025, through WaterTower Music label. An original song "I Feel Alive", written and performed by Black, preceded as the lead single.

== Background ==
Mark Mothersbaugh composed the film's original score, while Gabe Hilfer and Karyn Rachtman serve as music supervisors. He noted that creating the soundtrack for the film presented him a "unique challenge" as it had to balance the charm of the quirky characters with its intense action sequences having "high-energy moments". This provided him a thoughtful approach to ensure that the score not only compliments the action but adds "depth and emotional resonance".

Mothersbaugh incorporated nods to the music of the game by C418, whose title track plays during the opening credits, and the song "Dragon Fish" plays during a scene with pandas. Lena Raine's track "Pigstep" features during the "Nether's Got Talent" sequence. The score is performed by the New Zealand Symphony Orchestra conducted and orchestrated by Tim Davies and choir by The Tudor Consort. It was further recorded at the Michael Fowler Centre in Wellington.

Besides Mothersbaugh's score, the film further includes several original songs performed by Black. This included "I Feel Alive", written by Black, and features Foo Fighters frontman Dave Grohl on drums, Queens of the Stone Age guitarist Troy Van Leeuwen, Jellyfish keyboardist Roger Joseph Manning Jr., and Mark Ronson on both rhythm guitar and bass. Brooks also provides backup vocals. The song was released as a single on March 19, 2025. Mothersbaugh's score, along with original songs by Benee, Dayglow, and Dirty Honey, was released digitally on March 28 through WaterTower Music. The film also features an instrumental rendition of Depeche Mode's "Just Can't Get Enough" performed by Jamieson Shaw.

== Critical reception ==
David Ehrlich of IndieWire found the music "poppy". Calling the soundtrack as "boisterous and exciting" Charles Papadopoulos of Screen Rant also noted that it adds an "epic, fantastical element to the family-friendly comedy film." Julian Roman of MovieWeb was critical of Black's original songs being "bland or obnoxious"; however, he added "Mark Mothersbaugh of Devo fame adds a rocking 80s score that clears your ears of the original music."

== Track listing ==
No.	Title	Writer(s)	Artist(s)	Length
1.	"I Feel Alive"	Jack Black; Andrew Wyatt; Mark Ronson	Black	4:06
2.	"When I'm Gone"	Corey Coverstone; John Notto; Justin Smolian; Marc LaBelle	Dirty Honey	3:24
3.	"Change Song"	Sloan Struble	Dayglow	3:28
4.	"Zero to Hero"	Bret McKenzie	Benee	2:23
5.	"Could This Be Love?"	McKenzie	McKenzie	4:53
6.	"Just Can't Get Enough" (instrumental version)	Vince Clarke	Jamieson Shaw	1:42
7.	"Steve's Lava Chicken"	Black; Jared Hess	Black	0:34
8.	"Birthday Rap"	Black; Jason Momoa; John Spiker	Black; Momoa	0:40
9.	"Ode to Dennis"	Black	Black	0:44
10.	"Minecraft"	Daniel Rosenfeld		0:39
11.	"Mintage"	Mark Mothersbaugh; Peter Bateman; Sunna Wehrmeijer; Tim Jones		3:24
12.	"Midport Village"	Mothersbaugh; Wehrmeijer		3:00
13.	"Day to Night"	Mothersbaugh; Bateman		3:57
14.	"Steve in the Nether"	Mothersbaugh; Jones		4:00
15.	"Chicken Fight Club"	Mothersbaugh; Bateman		3:46
16.	"I Need a Win, Man"	Mothersbaugh; Wehrmeijer		3:14
17.	"I'm Coming With / Minecraft"	Mothersbaugh; Wehrmeijer; Jones; Rosenfeld		2:58
18.	"Nitwit Crosses and Steve Finds / Minecraft"	Mothersbaugh; Bateman; Wehrmeijer; Rosenfeld		3:01
19.	"Woodland Mansion Planning"	Mothersbaugh; Bateman; Jones		3:22
20.	"Steve vs. Malgosha"	Mothersbaugh; Bateman; Wehrmeijer		3:56
21.	"Piglins Attack"	Mothersbaugh; Bateman; Jones		4:07
22.	"Heroic Henry / Minecraft"	Mothersbaugh; Bateman; Wehrmeijer; Rosenfeld		3:02
23.	"Let's Go Fight Some Pigs"	Mothersbaugh; Bateman; Wehrmeijer		2:20
24.	"Run from the Great Hog"	Mothersbaugh; Bateman; Wehrmeijer		3:47
25.	"Back in the Nether"	Mothersbaugh; Bateman; Jones		3:42
Total length:				74:09

== Charts ==
Chart performance for A Minecraft Movie
Chart (2025)	Peak position
UK Compilation Albums (Official Charts)	19
UK Soundtrack Albums (Official Charts)	6

== Personnel ==
- Music: Mark Mothersbaugh
- Music supervisors: Gabe Hilfer, Karyn Rachtman
- Supervising music editor: Jamieson Shaw
- Music editors: Dominick Certo, Rose Mackenzie-Peterson
- Additional music by: Peter Bateman, Tim Jones, Sunna Wehrmeijer
- Score conducted by: Tim Davies
- Score recorded and mixed by: Brad Haehnel
- Pro-tools operator: Rose Mackenzie-Peterson
- Lead orchestrator: Tim Davies
- Orchestrators: Jeremy Levy, Lorenzo Carrano, Ryan Humphrey, Pano Fountas
- Music preparation: JoAnn Kane Music Service
- Score coordinators: Claire Wackrow, Carolina Borges
- Technical score engineer: Graham Kennedy
- Technical score coordinators: Seth Atkins Horan, Brooke Villanyi, Nigel Scott, Andrew Dalziel, Fergus Caldwell Drey, John Neill
- Music librarians: Brendan Agnew
- Music coordinators: Sandra Park, Otis Rachtman, Henry Van Roden
- Score recorded at: Michael Fowler Centre
- Score mixed at: Park Road Post, Noise Alchemy Studio
- Score musicians: New Zealand Symphony Orchestra
- Score choir: The Tudor Consort

== I...Am Steve (Bonus Songs from "A Minecraft Movie" Soundtrack) ==
I...Am Steve (Bonus Songs from "A Minecraft Movie" Soundtrack)

Soundtrack album / EP by Jack Black
- Released: April 18, 2025
- Genre: Soundtrack
- Length: 6:18
- Label: WaterTower Music
- Producer: John Spiker

Following the success of "Steve's Lava Chicken", a four-song extended play containing extended versions of "Steve's Lava Chicken", "Ode to Dennis" and "Birthday Rap" was released on April 18, 2025.

I...Am Steve (Bonus Songs from "A Minecraft Movie" Soundtrack) track listing
No.	Title	Writer(s)	Length
1.	"Steve's Lava Chicken" (extended version)	Jack Black; Jared Hess	1:15
2.	"Birthday Rap" (extended version; with Jason Momoa)	Black; Jason Momoa; John Spiker	1:00
3.	"Ode to Dennis" (extended version)	Black	3:25
4.	"Welcome to Steve's!"	Black	0:37
Total length:			6:18
