= Liam Lynch (musician) =

American filmmaker, singer, songwriter, musician and puppeteer (born 1970)

- Born: William Patrick Niederst; September 5, 1970 (age 55); Petersburg, Virginia, U.S.
- Genres: Alternative rock; comedy rock
- Occupations: Filmmaker; singer; musician; songwriter; puppeteer
- Instruments: Vocals; guitar
- Years active: 1993–present
- Labels: 111 Productions Inc; Global Warming; S-Curve
- Website: liamlynch.net

William Patrick Niederst (born September 5, 1970), better known as Liam Lynch, is an American filmmaker, singer, musician, songwriter, and puppeteer.

While studying at LIPA in Liverpool, United Kingdom, Lynch co-created, co-wrote, directed, scored, and produced the 1998 MTV comedy puppet series The Sifl and Olly Show. His 2003 album Fake Songs featured the song "United States of Whatever", which peaked within the top ten of the charts in Australia and the United Kingdom. He has since become more known for directing music videos for acts such as Queens of the Stone Age, Foo Fighters, Royal Blood, Tenacious D, Spinnerette, No Doubt, Eagles of Death Metal, "Weird Al" Yankovic, and They Might Be Giants.

Lynch directed the 2006 film Tenacious D in The Pick of Destiny after working with Tenacious D in 2002, having directed the music video for their song "Tribute". He also directed several short films that played as part of their live show, as well as the documentary On The Road with Tenacious D. He also wrote the original music used in the 2002 MTV animated series Clone High and co-wrote a song in the 2003 film School of Rock, as well as directing Sarah Silverman's 2005 stand-up comedy film Sarah Silverman: Jesus Is Magic.

== Early life ==
Lynch was born William Patrick Niederst in Petersburg, Virginia, on September 5, 1970. Before pursuing a career in the arts, he worked various jobs such as a restaurant dishwasher, a Blockbuster employee, a car washer, a box factory worker, a telemarketer, and a wax museum tour guide. He also tested artificial intelligence for Sony when they introduced their now-defunct AIBO robot dogs, and still owns the early prototype of the robot.

== Career ==
When Lynch was 23, his friend read a story in Rolling Stone that Paul McCartney was going to open a unique performing arts school in Liverpool called the Liverpool Institute for Performing Arts (LIPA) and gave Lynch information on how to apply. He was one of 40 musicians chosen to join LIPA from around the world. During his time in the United Kingdom, Lynch created the concept of what was to become The Sifl and Olly Show. He wanted to make something using the recordings he and Matt Crocco made a few years prior as a Christmas present for Crocco. He originally wanted to do stop motion photography, but didn't have the money or the equipment for it. When he made the first episode, it was 3 a.m. and he grabbed the only materials he had nearby, which were socks; he later said that "it could have easily been buckets". Making puppets out of his socks and borrowing a video camera from a friend, he created Sifl and Olly. He sent a few tapes to MTV Europe in 1996, leading them to become idents played in between music videos. A year later, the idents would become half-hour shows. In 1997, to work on The Sifl and Olly Show pilot, Lynch relocated back to the U.S. from Liverpool and settled in Nashville, Tennessee, though he briefly returned to Liverpool to finish his studies.

MTV began airing Sifl and Olly in the U.S. in July 1998, but the show only lasted two seasons. A third season was released as a DVD available through the Sifl and Olly website. Lynch's song "United States of Whatever" was featured during the first season of Sifl and Olly. When the show was canceled, he put the song on a sampler CD. It was used in a commercial for the 2003 video game Tony Hawk's Underground, with Tony Hawk having made a guest appearance on the third season of Sifl and Olly. The song was later featured on Lynch's 2003 album Fake Songs, produced by his own company 111 Productions, which led to the song peaking within the top ten of the charts in Australia and the United Kingdom. The song later gained a Guinness World Record for being the shortest song to peak within the top ten of the UK Singles Chart, clocking in at just 1 minute and 25 seconds. When he was asked to perform the song on Top of the Pops, Lynch was on tour with No Doubt to film them for a live DVD. Since he could not make the show, he promised to send a performance video in his place; the video, hastily shot and edited in one day, become the song's official music video.

While working on Fake Songs, Lynch directed a UK-only music video for the Foo Fighters song "Times Like These"; worked on DVDs for No Doubt, Tenacious D, and Eagles of Death Metal, Sarah Silverman, and Queens of the Stone Age; and finished composing music for the MTV animated series Clone High. He also co-wrote music for the Jack Black film School of Rock. He released several of his albums, including We're All-Nighters and How to Be a Satellite, in 2006. He released his album Get Up on the Raft in 2008. He also released two volumes of songs from his podcast Lynchland. He collaborated on and directed Sarah Silverman's film Sarah Silverman: Jesus Is Magic, also co-writing and producing the soundtrack. He then directed Tenacious D in The Pick of Destiny, released in late 2006, and helped to write and played guitar for the album of the same name. In 2007, he animated and voiced the character of Bulby, a wise-cracking light bulb created to promote the Queens of the Stone Age album Era Vulgaris.

In 2009, Lynch directed the music video for the song "Craigslist" by "Weird Al" Yankovic from his album Alpocalypse. Later that year, he was credited for the graphics and artwork on Them Crooked Vultures' debut self-titled album. In 2012, he directed several music videos for songs from Tenacious D's Rize of the Fenix album. He also made the artwork for the band's 2012 Jazz EP. In 2013, he directed the music video for They Might Be Giants' title track from the album Nanobots. In 2014, he directed the music video for "Weird Al" Yankovic's song "First World Problems" from his album Mandatory Fun. In 2018, he directed the music video for Queens of the Stone Age's song "Head Like a Haunted House" from their album Villains. In 2021, he directed and starred in the music videos for Royal Blood's songs "Boilermaker" and "Oblivion" from their album Typhoons. In 2024, Lynch animated a section of the music video for "Weird Al" Yankovic's single, Polkamania.

Pictures of Lynch were used as inspiration in designing one of the aliens in J. J. Abrams' 2009 Star Trek film. Lynch has a podcast, LynchLand, which features video animations, songs from his albums, and guests. He also features his cats and other animals around his home. His video podcast has over 90,000 viewers. He sells merchandise on his website to offset the costs of making the podcast. The podcast has featured appearances by Ringo Starr, Josh Homme, Sarah Silverman, Jack Black, Tony Hawk, Tim Robbins, Shirley Manson, "Weird Al" Yankovic, Dhani Harrison, and Alex Albrecht.

== Personal life ==
Lynch married his wife, artist Robin McCauley, on an unpublicized date in the wheel house of the RMS Queen Mary in Long Beach, California. He claims to have lived in a haunted building during his time in the United Kingdom, which gave him an interest in the paranormal. He and his wife have collected many audio recordings and videos of their paranormal experiences, some of which they have uploaded onto a YouTube channel called The Spark Club. In 2006, he had his pet cat cloned, making it the sixth cat ever to be cloned; the company who performed the cloning was later absorbed into ViaGen Pets.

Lynch has dyslexia, two types of color blindness, and insomnia. He is unable to burp. He does not drink alcohol or use recreational drugs of any kind. He is an avid gamer and can be seen in a bonus video on the original disc of the video game Guitar Hero, in which he explains the equipment he uses by Line 6, the company who developed the guitar tones for the game to match the various musicians they needed to mimic. He is a lifelong Doctor Who fan, and continues to watch the series and collect memorabilia.

== Filmography ==
=== Film ===
Year	Title	Notes
2003	School of Rock	Music consultant, songwriter ("Step Off")
2006	Tenacious D in The Pick of Destiny	Director, co-writer, songwriter ("Kickapoo", "Break-In City (Storm the Gate!)", and "Beelzeboss (The Final Showdown)")
2022	Futra Days	Special photographic effects supervisor

=== Television ===
Year	Title	Role	Notes
1998–1999	The Sifl and Olly Show	Olly, various	Co-creator, director, writer, producer, composer
2002–2003	Clone High		Composer, songwriter
2003	Diary		Director (1 episode)
2003	Dave Matthews Band: The Central Park Concert		Producer
2005	Sarah Silverman: Jesus Is Magic		Director, composer
2013	Sarah Silverman: We Are Miracles		Director, consulting producer
2017	Sarah Silverman: A Speck of Dust		Director
2018	Tig Notaro: Happy To Be Here		Editor

=== Music videos ===
Year	Title	Role	Notes
2002	"Tribute" – Tenacious D	Himself (cameo)	Director, editor
2006	"POD" – Tenacious D		Director, editor
2007	"Sick, Sick, Sick" - Queens of the Stone Age (Alternate Music Video)	Also starred in	Director, editor
2008	"Wannabe in L.A." – Eagles of Death Metal		Director
2008	"Ghetto Love" - Spinnerette		Director
2009	"Craigslist" – 'Weird Al' Yankovic		Director
2012	"Low Hanging Fruit" – Tenacious D		Director
2012	"Rock is Dead" – Tenacious D		Director
2013	"First World Problems" – 'Weird Al' Yankovic		Director
2013	"Where Have We Been" – Tenacious D		Director
2013	"Nanobots" – They Might Be Giants		Director
2017	"Head Like a Haunted House" – Queens of the Stone Age		Director
2021	"Boilermaker" – Royal Blood	Also starred in	Director
2021	"Oblivion" – Royal Blood	Also starred in	Director
2021	"End of Me" – Billy Talent		Director
2023	"Emotion Sickness" – Queens of the Stone Age		Director
2024	"Polkamania!" - "Weird Al" Yankovic ("Old Town Road" segment)		Director

=== Web ===
Year	Title	Role	Notes
2012–2013	Sifl and Olly Video Game Reviews	Olly, various	Co-creator, director, writer, composer

== Discography ==
Solo albums

- Eel (1995, self-released)
- We're All Nighters (2002, 111 Productions Inc)
- Fake Songs (2003, S-Curve)
- How to Be a Satellite (2006, 111 Productions Inc)
- Songs from Lynchland (2006, 111 Productions Inc)
- More Songs from Lynchland (2007, 111 Productions Inc)
- Get Up on the Raft (2008, 111 Productions Inc)
- The Middle (2011, 111 Productions Inc)
- New Springs (2014, 111 Productions Inc)
- The Whole Damn Thing (2017, 111 Productions Inc)
- Be An Owl (2018, 111 Productions Inc)
- Crowing (2021, 111 Productions Inc)
- What the Moths Say (2023, 111 Productions Inc)
- Where Are You Headed (2025, 111 Productions Inc)

Albums with Matt Crocco

- Camp Sunny Side Up (with Matt Crocco) (1999, 111 Productions Inc)
- History of America? (with Matt Crocco) (2000, 111 Productions Inc)
- Sifl and Olly – Songs of Season One (with Matt Crocco) (2001, 111 Productions Inc)

Other appearances

- School of Rock – Official soundtrack (2003)
- Eagles of Death Metal – Death by Sexy (2006)
- Sarah Silverman – Jesus Is Magic (2006)
- Tenacious D – The Pick of Destiny (2006)
- Queens of the Stone Age – Era Vulgaris (2007)
