= Dirty Honey =

American rock band

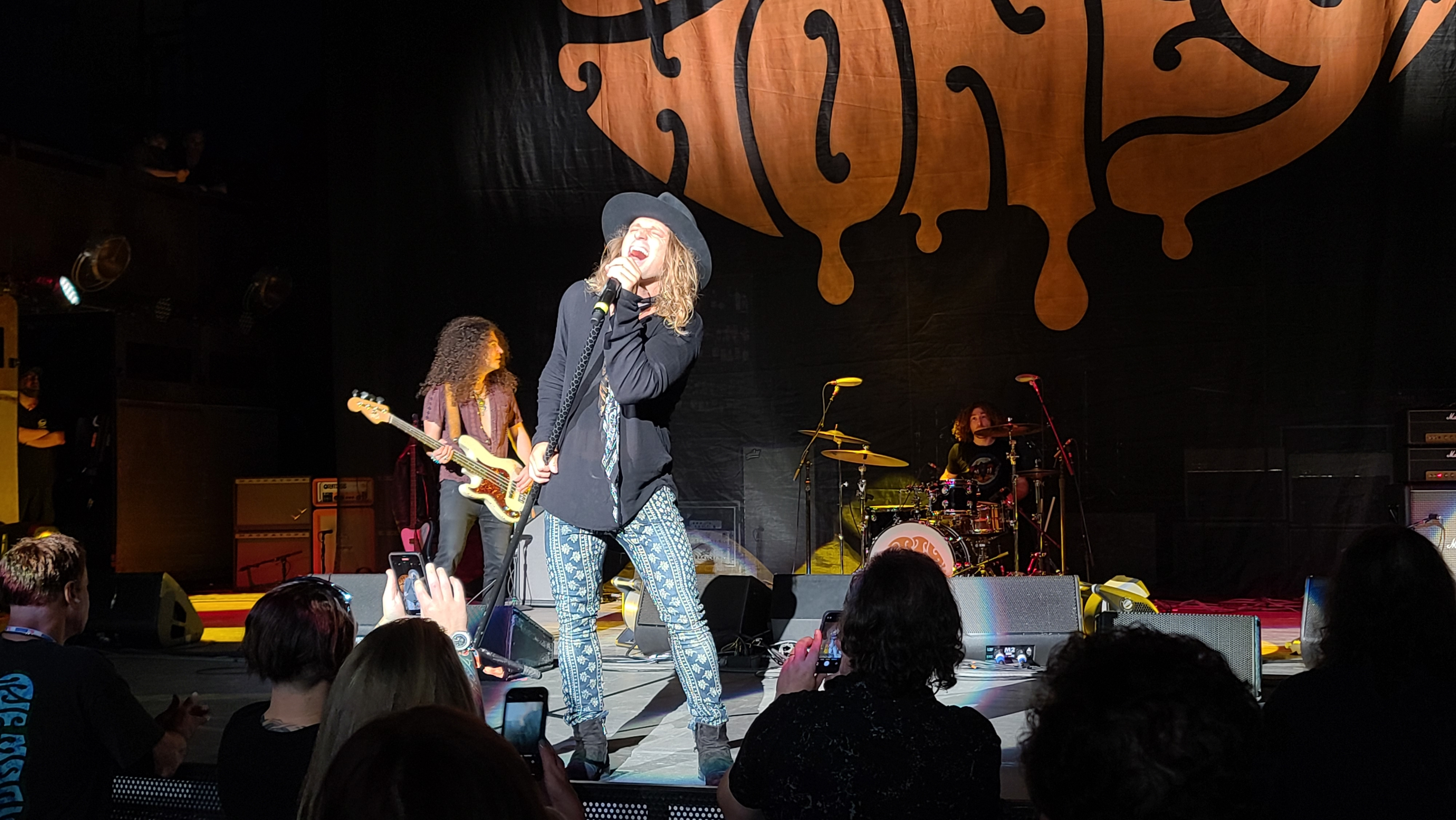
- Justin Smolian, Marc LaBelle, and Corey Coverstone in 2021 in Holmdel, New Jersey

Background information
- Origin: Los Angeles, California, United States
- Genres: Hard rock, blues rock, classic rock revival
- Years active: 2017–present
- Label: Dirt Records
- Members: Marc LaBelle; John Notto; Justin Smolian; Jaydon Bean
- Past members: Corey Coverstone
- Website: dirtyhoney.com

Dirty Honey is an American rock band from Los Angeles, formed in 2017. It consists of singer Marc LaBelle, guitarist John Notto, bassist Justin Smolian, and drummer Jaydon Bean.

Their self-titled extended play was self-released in March 2019. The single "When I'm Gone" topped the Billboard Mainstream Rock Songs chart, making them the first unsigned band to ever do so.

== History ==
After moving to Los Angeles in an attempt to duplicate the success of Guns N' Roses, guitarist John Notto met vocalist Marc LaBelle while he was playing various gigs with his then group, Ground Zero, which Notto became a part of. Ground Zero played a mix of covers and original songs written by LaBelle. LaBelle and Notto decided to independently form their own band when Notto recruited a new Ground Zero bassist, Justin Smolian. When the trio had trouble finding a drummer, Smolian brought in Corey Coverstone, who enthusiastically asked to join. After Coverstone joined, the group decided to officially go by the name "Dirty Honey." Until then, the band was called The Shags. The group became official in 2017 after they performed their second show on the sidewalk of Sunset Boulevard in front of about 100 people.

LaBelle came up with the band's name after hearing Robert Plant mention his band The Honeydrippers in a Howard Stern interview and thought it sounded like a "dirty" rock and roll name.

After hearing their song "When I'm Gone", the band's longtime friend Mark DiDia, a music industry veteran from Columbia Records, became their manager. He quickly arranged opening gigs for Slash in 2018 and 2019 (with various shows featuring Myles Kennedy and the Conspirators). The song was also #1 on Billboard's Mainstream Rock Songs airplay chart making them the first unsigned band in history to achieve that feat.

The band traveled to Australia to record their self-titled extended play with producer Nick DiDia. It was self-released on March 22, 2019. Eight hours later, the members were contacted by friends and family telling them their music was being played on the radio.

Dirty Honey toured in 2019 with Goodbye June as the opening act for Red Sun Rising on their Peel Tour. On May 7, the band opened for The Who at the Van Andel Arena in Grand Rapids, Michigan as part of their Moving On! Tour. Dirty Honey opened for Skillet and Alter Bridge on their Victorious Sky Tour from September 22 to October 25. They also supported Guns N' Roses on their Not in This Lifetime Tour on November 1 and 2 in Las Vegas.

The band was nominated for "Best New Rock/Alternative Artist" for the 2020 iHeartRadio Music Awards.

Originally planning a return to Australia to record their self-titled debut album in March 2020, flight restrictions caused by the COVID-19 pandemic forced them to relocate to Henson Studios in Hollywood, California, with producer Nick DiDia virtually supervising them, along with the complete scrapping of the music video for the track "Heartbreaker" from their previous EP. The album was released April 23, 2021. It was elected by Loudwire as the 30th best rock/metal album of 2021.

In 2021, Dirty Honey toured in support of their debut album on the California Dreamin' tour with opening act Joyous Wolf, as well as opening for The Black Crowes on their Shake Your Money Maker tour. On January 1, 2022, they released a cover of the Prince song "Let's Go Crazy", which they performed for the 2022 NHL Winter Classic.

Dirty Honey co-headlined the Young Guns Tour with Mammoth WVH in 2022. They embarked on their first European tour in summer 2022, which included shows opening for Guns N' Roses, Kiss, and Rival Sons. They went on a North American tour, also titled the California Dreamin' Tour, in fall 2022 with supporting acts Dorothy and Mac Saturn.

On January 3, 2023, the band announced a reworking of the track "Heartbreaker" which was released the following Friday.

On January 21, 2023, the band began its first European / UK tour as headliners with a stop in Norwich, UK. This was the band's first show with new drummer Jaydon Bean, as Corey Coverstone had exited the band citing his dislike of extensive touring.

On November 3, 2023, the band released their second album, Can't Find The Brakes. Their third album, Catch My Butterfly, is set for release on January 27, 2027.

== Band members ==
Current

- Marc LaBelle – lead vocals (2017–present)
- John Notto – guitar (2017–present)
- Justin Smolian – bass guitar (2017–present)
- Jaydon Bean – drums (2023–present)

Former

- Corey Coverstone – drums (2017–2023)

== Discography ==
=== Studio albums ===
- Dirty Honey (2021)
- Can't Find the Brakes (2023)
- Catch My Butterfly (2027)

=== EPs ===
- Dirty Honey (2019)

=== Live albums ===
- Mayhem and Revelry (2025)

=== Singles ===
Title	Year	Peak chart positions					Album
Title	Year	US Main.	US Rock Air.	US Rock	CAN Rock	CZ Rock	Album
"Fire Away"	2018	—	—	—	—	—	Non-album single
"When I'm Gone"	2019	1	13	27	14	5	Dirty Honey (EP)
"Rolling 7s"	2019	3	23	—	11	—	Dirty Honey (EP)
"Last Child" (Aerosmith cover)	2021	—	—	—	—	—	Non-album single
"California Dreamin'"	2021	12	22	—	34	—	Dirty Honey
"Tied Up"	2021	—	—	—	—	—	Dirty Honey
"Gypsy"	2021	—	—	—	—	—	Dirty Honey
"The Wire"	2021	19	46	—	—	—	Dirty Honey
"Another Last Time"	2022	23	—	—	—	—	Dirty Honey
"Let's Go Crazy" (Prince cover)	2022	—	—	—	—	—	Non-album singles
"Heartbreaker 2.0"	2023	—	—	—	—	—	Non-album singles
"Won't Take Me Alive"	2023	7	—	—	—	—	Can't Find the Brakes
"Can't Find the Brakes"	2023	—	—	—	—	—	Can't Find the Brakes
"Coming Home (Ballad of the Shire)"	2023	32	—	—	—	—	Can't Find the Brakes
"Don't Put Out the Fire"	2024	18	32	—	—	—	Can't Find the Brakes
"When I'm Gone" (Re-Release)	2025	—	—	—	—	—	A Minecraft Movie (soundtrack)
"Lights Out"	2026	29	—	—	—	—	Catch My Butterfly
"Butterfly"	2026	—	—	—	—	—	Catch My Butterfly
"American Lies"	2026	—	—	—	—	—	Catch My Butterfly

=== Music videos ===
Title	Year	Director(s)
"When I'm Gone"	2019	Magnus Jonsson, Martin Landgreve
"Rolling 7s"	2019	Scott Fleishman
"California Dreamin'"	2021	Scott Fleishman
"The Wire"	2021	Scott Fleishman
"Another Last Time"	2022	Scott Fleishman
"Won't Take Me Alive"	2023	George Gallardo Kattah
"Coming Home (Ballad of the Shire)"	2024	Mark Christy
"Don't Put Out the Fire"	2024	Zebulon Griffin
"Rock Steady"	2025	Unknown
