= The Ladies' Bras =

2007 song

Single by Jonny Trunk and Wisbey

from the album Now We Are Ten
- Released: August 20, 2007
- Length: 0:36
- Label: Trunk Records
- Composer: Herbert Chappell
- Lyricist: Wisbey

Audio
- "The Ladies' Bras" on YouTube

"The Ladies' Bras" is a song by Jonny Trunk and Wisbey which reached number 27 in the UK singles chart in September 2007. At 36 seconds, it was the shortest song ever to enter the chart, taking the record just a few weeks after the song "Spider Pig" (1 minute, 4 seconds), from the 2007 film The Simpsons Movie had taken it. Before that, the shortest charting single had been Liam Lynch's 2002 "United States of Whatever" (1 minutes, 26 seconds). In 2025, the record of the shortest song to enter the UK top 40 chart was broken by the 34-second long "Steve's Lava Chicken" by Jack Black from the film A Minecraft Movie.

"The Ladies' Bras" became popular after it was played on Danny Baker's All Day Breakfast Show podcast show, reaching number 70 on the UK singles chart with 1,644 sales and no national airplay. It was later picked up by Scott Mills on BBC Radio 1, who campaigned to get it in the charts by asking guests on his show including McFly and Dannii Minogue to sing it live on air. Originally available on the Trunk Records 10th anniversary compilation CD Now We Are Ten, the track was also available for download on services such as iTunes and Wippit and had no official music video.

The melody is "The Gonk" from George Romero's 1978 Dawn of the Dead soundtrack, as played in the supermarket scenes.
