= Production music =

Stock music for film and TV

Production music (also known as library music, stock music, or sync music) is recorded music that can be licensed to customers for use in film, television, radio and other media. Often, the music is produced and owned by production music libraries.

== Background ==
Unlike popular and classical music publishers, who typically own less than 50 percent of the copyright in a composition, production music libraries own all of the copyrights of their music. Thus, unlike when licencing from normal publishers, it can be licensed without the composer's permission. This is because virtually all music created for music libraries is done on a work-for-hire basis. Production music is a convenient solution for media producers— they are able to license any piece of music in the library at a reasonable rate, whereas a specially commissioned work could be prohibitively expensive. Similarly, licensing a well-known piece of popular music could cost anywhere from tens to hundreds of thousands of dollars, depending on the prominence of the performer(s).

The first production music library was set up by De Wolfe Music in 1927 with the advent of sound in film. The company originally scored music for use in silent film.

Production music libraries typically offer a broad range of musical styles and genres, enabling producers and editors to find a wide variety of music within the same library. Music libraries vary in size from a few hundred tracks up to many thousands.

Production music is frequently used as theme or background music in radio, film and television. Well-known examples of British TV series with theme songs sourced from library catalogs include Ski Sunday ("Pop Looks Bach" by Sam Fonteyn), Dave Allen At Large ("Studio 69", sometimes known as "Blarney's Stoned", by Alan Hawkshaw), Mastermind ("Approaching Menace" by Neil Richardson), the original theme for the BBC's Grandstand ("News Scoop" by Len Stevens), Crimewatch ("Rescue Helicopter" by John Cameron) and Grange Hill ("Chicken Man" by Alan Hawkshaw). The Christmas hit single based on the character Mr Blobby uses excerpts from "Mr Jellybun" by Paul Shaw and David Rogers. Arthur Wood's "Barwick Green", written in 1924, still serves as the theme for long-running BBC Radio soap The Archers. TV comedy series such as The Benny Hill Show and Monty Python's Flying Circus also made extensive use of production library cues (many sourced from the De Wolfe catalogue) as background or incidental music.

American TV has also utilized production music, most notably with the themes for Monday Night Football ("Heavy Action" by Johnny Pearson) and The People's Court ("The Big One" by Alan Tew). Other notable examples are the Nickelodeon animated series The Ren and Stimpy Show and SpongeBob SquarePants, which use well-known classical music excerpts and a wide range of production music cues from the 1950s and 60s, some of which were composed by Emil Cadkin and other musicians from the Capitol Hi-Q library-including many pieces familiar from their use in earlier cartoons as well as films like Night of the Living Dead—which were chosen for their ironic, suspenseful, patriotic and humorous effect.

Production music composers and session performers typically work anonymously and have rarely become known outside their professional circle. In recent years some veteran composer-performers in this field such as Alan Hawkshaw, John Cameron and Keith Mansfield have achieved attention and popularity as a result of a new interest in production music of the 1960s and 1970s, notably the 'beat' and electronica cues recorded for KPM and other labels, which have been widely sampled by DJs and record producers. In recent years, some of these British musicians have given public performances of their classic compositions under the group name KPM Allstars.

=== As popular music ===
As noted by library music historian Jonny Trunk, founder of Trunk Records, library music gained wider appeal in the 1990s when it was made public for the first time. In the 1980s, there were hundreds of library companies producing music with old records becoming redundant, especially with the advent of CDs. By the mid-1990s, these companies, many located in Soho, London, were dumping their old and obsolete vinyl records on local record and charity shops. Many record collectors became interested in the genre, and it gained a cult following. Trunk wrote the first book on the subject, The Music Library, published in 2005, and in the following years many classic production music records were reissued.

In the 2000s, library music also began to interest crate-digging hip hop producers. Some were interested, in part, because of the sample-clearance issues faced with commercial music releases while others, such as Madlib, have used it for its unique musical quality. Library music has been sampled by artists including the Avalanches, Jay-Z, Beyoncé, A$AP Rocky, Flying Lotus, RZA, Swizz Beatz and Ghostface Killah. Some music producers, such as Frank Dukes, have also been inspired by the library music model and distribute some of their compositions as production music for sampling.

== Industry ==
=== Market ===
The production music market is dominated by libraries affiliated with the large record and publishing companies: Universal Music Publishing Group library music has the music libraries of Chappell Recording Music Library, Bruton, Atmosphere, and others such as Killer Tracks; Concord Music owns Imagem Production Music, formerly Boosey & Hawkes Production Music, which includes the Cavendish, Abaco and Strip Sounds labels; Sony Music Publishing owns KPM Music and Extreme Music; BMG Rights Management runs its own production music division; and Warner Chappell Music owns Warner/Chappell Production Music. TikTok and YouTube also own libraries of production music.

Sonoton is the largest independent production music library. Other independent libraries include Vanacore Music, ALIBI Music, Molecular Originals, West One Music Group, Epidemic Sound, and Audio Network.

=== Business model ===
The business model of production music libraries is based on two income streams:

License or synchronization fees
These are the fees paid upfront to the library for permission to synchronize its music to a piece of film, video or audio. These fees can range from a few dollars for internet usage, to thousands for network commercial usage. Some libraries, especially in the UK and Europe, split these fees with the composer of the music. In the US, it is more common for a composer to be paid a work-for-hire fee upfront by the library for composing the music, thus waiving their share of any future license fees. In the UK, license fees for production music are nationally standardized and set by the MCPS. In the US and elsewhere, libraries are free to determine their own license fees.
Performance income (or performance royalties)
Performances income is generated when music is publicly performed—for example, on television or radio. The producer of the show or film that has licensed the music does not pay these fees. Instead, large fees are paid annually by broadcasters (such as television networks and radio stations) to performing rights organizations (PROs) such as ASCAP, BMI and SESAC in the US and the PRS in the UK, who then distribute income among their members. To ensure it is distributed fairly and accurately, most broadcasters are required to keep note of what music they have broadcast and for how long. This information is then used by the performance societies to allocate income to their members. Typically, a library will receive 50 percent of the performance income (this is known as the publisher's share), with the composer receiving the remaining 50 percent. Like license fees, performance income is highly variable and dependent on the nature of the usage; local radio usage will yield modest income—perhaps a few dollars each time it is played. Repeated use in a primetime network TV show can generate thousands of dollars. Another method, in the United States, of collecting royalties for performances of production, stock, and library music is through directly negotiating royalties with composers and bypassing PROs. BMI and ASCAP, and more recently SESAC, no longer have exclusive representation of composers for the collection of performance royalties. By directly negotiating the performance royalties with rights holders, licensees can pay less for the performance of a cue of music, and the licenser (the rights holder) can receive more than the PRO would pay. This is because of the removal of not only the administrative costs incurred through a PRO collecting royalties, but the removal of the "weight variable" which pays the highest performing songwriters and composers a portion of all fees collected.

=== Hybrid license method ===
This method of licensing combines the creation of original, custom music with a catalog of traditional "library" music under one license agreement. The goal is to suit the needs of a budget conscious production but still provide that production with a unique and original show theme or audio brand. In this scenario, the show producer identifies those scenes they feel are most important to the success of the show, and those scenes are scored to picture by the composer. Those less important scenes will utilize the library also provided by the same publisher/composer. Upon completion, the custom music and the library tracks are licensed together under one production blanket, the ownership of the custom music remains with the publisher who produced it, and the publisher can (after a term of exclusivity negotiated between the parties) re-license the custom music as part of its library to recoup production costs.

This allows the music composer/producer to quote lower rates because they are retaining ownership of the custom music, and will have the ability to make money with the same recording in a different production later on. It also allows the program or film producer to deliver content of very high quality, ensures that the most important scenes have the perfect music, and those less important scenes are addressed with an affordable solution.

== Libraries ==
=== Royalty-free libraries ===
"Monkeys Spinning Monkeys" by Kevin MacLeod, an example of royalty-free music

With the proliferation of music libraries in recent years and the increase in competition, some smaller libraries have evolved the royalty-free music model. These libraries do not charge their customers for licensing the music. Instead, the customers purchase a CD or access to an electronic collection of music—priced typically between 50 and 300 dollars—whose content is licensed in perpetuity for them to synchronize as often as they wish. These libraries depend mainly on performance royalties for their income (with a small amount of income from sales of physical CDs or online track downloads). Assuming that the music is broadcast, royalties are paid on the music, though it is the broadcaster who pays them via annual fees to the performing rights societies, not the producer who uses the music in their production.

Some companies offer truly royalty-free music which is not registered with any performance rights organisation (also known as "royalty collection agencies"). These companies license music to their customers on a non-exclusive basis where it can be used in perpetuity without any usage reporting. The music is licensed by the customers according to an accepted license agreement, and they cannot sell it or license it to others. Because of advancing technology, it is becoming easier for independent musicians to set up their own shops through which they can license music.

=== Non-exclusive libraries ===
Non-exclusive production music libraries enable a composer to sign a non-exclusive agreement allowing the artist to license the same piece to other libraries and clients with the same non-exclusive agreement. In other words, their intellectual property (their composition) can be licensed to multiple clients simultaneously, provided that they are not contractually bound by an exclusive agreement with another company. The non-exclusive library does not own the rights outside of the licenses that are made by that library. Typically the library does not pay for the piece, and the artist receives no payment until the piece is licensed, at which point the library and the artist split the license fee equally. Libraries typically require the artist to rename the piece in effect creating a unique art work for the library to register with their PRO (BMI, ASCAP, SESAC). Should the composer want to enter the piece into an exclusive agreement with a library or client, they would first need to remove that piece from all non-exclusive agreements.

An advantage to using a non-exclusive library is the possible broad exposure through multiple outlets, and the ability of the artist to retain control. Conversely, if an artist sells their piece to an exclusive library they are paid upfront for the piece but the artist typically sells the publishing rights, hence losing control of the piece and future licensing fees.

== See also ==
- APM Music
- Bruton Music
- De Wolfe Music
- Extreme Music
- KPM Music
- List of films in the public domain
- Kevin MacLeod, who has produced a wide variety of royalty-free library music under Creative Commons licenses
- Sonoton
- Stock footage
- Test card music
- Universal Production Music
