= Trunk Records =

British record label

- Founded: 1995
- Founder: Jonny Trunk
- Status: Active
- Genre: Film scores, jazz, humor, music, art
- Country of origin: United Kingdom
- Official website: trunkrecords.com

Trunk Records is a British independent record label, which specialises mainly in lost film scores, unreleased TV music, library music, old advertising jingles, art, sexploitation and kitsch releases.

It was founded in 1995 by Jonny Trunk, and has since gained a cult following as a result of the releases of highly influential material from scores for films such as The Wicker Man, Deep Throat, Kes, The Blood on Satan's Claw and George A. Romero's Dawn of the Dead.

Other releases include soundtracks for 1970s UK Television series such as The Tomorrow People, UFO and Vernon Elliott's score for Clangers and Ivor the Engine. As well as film music and jazz, the label has also brought to public attention the lost or unreleased works of electronic pioneers such as Tristram Cary and John Baker, artists such as Bruce Lacey and avant-garde recordings made both by and for children, including the work inspired by radical free thinker and educational pioneer John Paynter.

== History ==
Trunk Records was founded by Jonny Trunk in 1995 in the United Kingdom. Initially, the label was set up as a means to release material from the Bosworth Library archive, the oldest existing music library. Since then, the label has adhered to its mantra of "Music, nostalgia and sex", and established itself as a label popular amongst film and TV fans as well as record collectors.

It has also become infamous for its records associated with the 1960s and 1970s soft pornography such as the soundtrack to Deep Throat, Flexi-Sex (a compilation of flexi-discs from 1970s British magazines), Mary Millington Talks Dirty and Dirty Fan Male, an album based on Jonny Trunk's own experiences organising various glamour models' fan clubs including that of his sister, Eve Vorley.

As well as film music and jazz, the label has also brought to public attention the lost or unreleased works of electronic pioneers such as Tristram Cary, Edward Williams and BBC Radiophonic Workshop's John Baker.

Jonny Trunk has also released his own material through the label, including his album, The Inside Outside. Since 2003, Trunk has been responsible for the rediscovery of composer and jazz drummer Basil Kirchin, by releasing his unknown 1960s experimental jazz and soundtrack work. The label has also been responsible for issuing the UK's rarest jazz album, "Moonscape" by The Michael Garrick Trio. Recent work has included a release of "Noise Art", the recordings found in the studio of late British underground film maker and artist Jeff Keen.

Various Jonny Trunk side projects have included directing the now banned pop video, "Plug Me In", for Add N To (X).

Jonny Trunk is also a regular broadcaster on London's art radio station Resonance FM. Other recent broadcasting has included the BBC Radio 4 documentary Into The Music Library.

"The Ladies' Bras", a single by Jonny Trunk and Wisbey, made number 70 on the UK Singles Chart in August 2007, and re-entered at number 27 in September 2007 after a campaign by Danny Baker and BBC Radio 1's Scott Mills. At 36 seconds long, it was at the time the shortest track ever to chart in the top 30, a record since broken by Jack Black with "Steve's Lava Chicken".

== Artists ==
- Leona Anderson
- John Baker
- David Cain
- John Cameron
- Tristram Cary
- Delia Derbyshire
- Vernon Elliott
- Michael Garrick
- Barry Gray
- Tubby Hayes
- Jeff Keen
- Basil Kirchin
- Desmond Leslie
- Sven Libaek
- Daphne Oram
- Carl Orff
- Mike Sammes
- Jonny Trunk
- Desmond Leslie
- Bruce Lacey
- John Paynter

== Discography ==
No.	Artist	Title	Year
BARKED 1P/1LP	Various	The Super Sounds of Bosworth	
BARKED 2LP/2CD	Various	The Super Sounds of Bosworth, Volume Two	
BARKED 3LP/3CD	Various	The Battle of Bosworth	
BARKED 4P/4LP/4CD	Paul Giovanni & Magnet	The Wicker Man	
JBH001	Syd Dale	"Theme to Screen Test (Marching There and Back)"	
SOUP 001LP/001CD	Vernon Elliott	Clangers : Original Television Music	
TTT001	Jonny Trunk & Slide	"The Snow It Melts The Soonest"	
TTT002	Jonny Trunk	"Sister Woo"/"Mr Hand"	
KES001LP/001CD	John Cameron	Kes Original Soundtrack	
B01	Mary Millington	Mary Millington Talks Dirty	
XXX1LP/1CD	Various	Deep Throat Original Movie Soundtrack	
SEC 001LP/001CD	Various	Resurrection: The Amplified Bible of Heavenly Grooves	
WWW1/DFM001LP/001CD	Trunk & Wisbey	Dirty Fan Male	
TTT003/003CD	Transcargo	Oh Boy	
JBH002CD/002LP	John Cameron	Psychomania Original Soundtrack	
JBH003CD	Basil Kirchin	Quantum	
TTT004	Jonny Trunk	"Dead Soon"	
JBH004CD/004LP	Various	Flexi-Sex	
JBH005CD/005LP	Basil Kirchin	Charcoal Sketches/States of Mind	
JBH007CD	Transcargo	idleluxury	
JBH008CD/008LP	Jonny Trunk	The Inside Outside	
JBH010LP	Various	UFO	
JBH011CD/011LP	Various	Dawn of the Dead: The Unreleased Incidental Music	
JBH012CD/012LP	Basil Kirchin	Abstraction of the Industrial North	
JBH014CD/014LP	Desmond Leslie	Music of the Future	
JBH015CD	Trunk & Wisbey	Dirty Fan Male (New & Improved)	
JBH016CD/016LP/PD	Derek Griffiths & John Le Mesurier	Bod: Words & Music	
JBH017LP/017CD	Delia Derbyshire, Dudley Simpson, Brian Hodgson & David Vorhaus	The Tomorrow People Original Television Music	
JBH018LP/018CD	Various	Fuzzy Felt Folk	
JBH019LP/019CD	Mike Sammes & The Mike Sammes Singers	Music for Biscuits	
JBH020LP/020CD	Sven Libaek	Inner Space	
JBH021LP/021CD	Basil Kirchin	Particles	
JBH022LP/022CD	Michael Garrick Trio	Moonscape	
JBH023LP/023CD	Marc Wilkinson	The Blood on Satan's Claw	
JBH024CD	Various	Now We Are Ten	
JBH025CD/025LP	Jonathan Klein, Herbie Hancock, Thad Jones, Ron Carter and Grady Tate	Hear O Israel	
JBH026LP	Various	Mike Taylor Remembered	
JBH027LP/027CD	The Vernon Elliott Ensemble	Ivor the Engine (with music from Pogles' Wood)	
JBH028CD	John Baker	The John Baker Tapes Volume 1	
JBH029CD	John Baker	The John Baker Tapes Volume 2	
JBH030LP	John Baker	The John Baker Tapes	
JBH031CD	Ted Taylor, Tubby Hayes and The Mike Sammes Singers	Hymns A' Swinging	
JBH032LP/032CD	Various	G-Spots. The electro jazz folk horror world of Studio G	
TTT005	Tubby Hayes	Voodoo Session	
JBH033LP/033CD	Jonny Trunk	Scrap Book	
JBH034LP/034CD	Edward Williams	Life on Earth - Music from the 1979 BBC TV series	
JBH035LP/035CD	Tristram Carey	It's Time for Tristram Cary	
JBH036LP/036CD	Kenny Graham and His Satellites	Moondog and Suncat Suites by Kenny Graham and His Satellites	
JBH037CD	Leona Anderson	Music to Suffer By (Remastered)	
TTT006	The Jellies	Jive Baby on a Saturday Night	
JBH038CD/038LP	Basil Kirchin	Soundtrack to Primitive London / Freelance	
RSD001LP	Basil Kirchin	Soundtrack to The Shuttered Room, one-off test pressing for Record Store Day	
JBH039CD/039LP	Barry Gray	Stand By For Adverts	
JBH040CD/040LP	Sandra Cross	The MMs Bar Recording	
JBH041CD/041LP	Michael Garrick and Shake Keane	Rising Stars	
OST001CD	Adrian Corker	Soundtrack From Way Of The Morris	
JBH042CD/042LP	Rick Jones and Michale Jessett	Fingerbobs	
JBH043CD/043LP	David Cain (composer) with the poetry of Ronald Duncan	Radiophonic Workshop The Seasons	
JBH044CD/044LP	Bob Chance	It's Broken	
JBH045CD	Refined Lard	A Trunk Records Sampler	
JBH047CD/047LP	Jeff Keen	Noise Art	
JBH048CD/048LP	Carl Orff and Gunild Keetman	Music For Children	
TTT007 10"	Daphne Oram and Tom Dissevelt	Electronic Sound Patterns and Electronic Movements	
JBH049CD/049LP	Various	Classroom Projects - Music Made By Children In Schools	
JBH050CD/050LP	Palmer Rockey	Rockey's Style Movie Album	
JBH051CD/051LP	Kenny Graham	The Small World of Sammy Lee OST	
JBH052CD/052LP	Various Artists	Funny Old Shit Volume One	
JBH053CD/053LP	Bruce Lacey	The Spacey Bruce Lacey Volume One	
JBH054LP	Bruce Lacey	The Spacey Bruce Lacey Volume Two	
TTT008	Delia Derbyshire And Anthony Newley	Moogies Bloogies	

== See also ==
- List of record labels
- List of independent UK record labels
