= The Sifl and Olly Show =

US television program

- Screenshot showing Sifl (left) and Olly (right).
- Genre: Surreal humor Adult puppeteering
- Created by: Liam Lynch and Matt Crocco
- Starring: Matt Crocco and Liam Lynch
- Composer: Liam Lynch
- Country of origin: United States
- Original language: English
- No. of seasons: 3

Production
- Producers: Liam Lynch, Matt Crocco, and Michael Taylor
- Cinematography: Steve Priola
- Editors: Byron Glickfeld and Thomas G. Olsen
- Running time: 30 minutes

Original release
- Network: MTV
- Release: July 14, 1998 – 1999

Related
- Sifl & Olly Video Game Reviews

The Sifl and Olly Show is a comedy TV series that incorporates sock puppets, animation, and musical performances. Musicians Liam Lynch and Matt Crocco created and performed the series. The show premiered on MTV in 1998 and was cancelled in 1999. The characters, along with new material, currently appear on Liam Lynch's podcast entitled Lynchland.

== History ==
The origins of The Sifl & Olly Show go back to the 1980s. As children, Crocco and Lynch would create and perform funny songs and sketches to entertain themselves. They remained friends through high school and college, even though they saw little of each other while they attended Kent State University. Lynch left Kent State and the duo was separated for a few years, but they reunited in Nashville, Tennessee in the 1990s and recorded the comedy album Camp Sunny Side Up on a 4-Track. During this period they were also constantly recording funny conversations, interviews, sketches, and songs. Soon after, Lynch moved to Liverpool, England to attend the Liverpool Institute of Performing Arts, but the friends continued to make funny recordings and send them to each other.

In 1995, while Lynch was still in Liverpool, he found some broken 4-Track tapes and repaired them. These tapes contained conversations and material intended for his and Crocco's second comedy album (which they never recorded). He decided to make something using these tapes as a Christmas present for Crocco. Lynch had been inspired by a series of British commercials by Aardman Studios and had hoped to do stop-action clay animation, but he did not have the money or the equipment for it. Instead, he made puppets out of his own socks and a large plastic sunflower and recorded a video of himself acting out their tapes with the puppets. Lynch chose the name for the puppets from a fake commercial Crocco had made for one of their recordings, and Sifl & Olly were born.

Lynch sent copies to MTV and MTV Europe, and although MTV America rejected them, MTV Europe liked them. In 1996, MTV Europe began airing Sifl & Olly clips between music videos as "idents." The popularity of the clips led to MTV America offering a half-hour format called The Sifl & Olly Show in July 1998. The show aired late at night, but was later moved to the evening.

In the first season, clips of Sifl and Olly were mixed with music videos. Whenever the show was aired again, the music videos would be removed, leaving only the comedy clips. The show gained a cult following, but it was cancelled after the second season. A third season was recorded, and MTV promised to release the episodes on the internet but never did. The lost episodes were eventually released on DVD.

Despite its cancellation, Sifl and Olly still appear along with some other characters in occasional episodes of Liam Lynch's podcast, Lynchland. Most of these appearances are clips from Season 3.

On June 14, 2012, Liam Lynch posted a picture on his Twitter account of a set similar to that used on the show, fueling speculation about the show's return. This was followed by another picture posted on July 25 of a graphic for "Precious Roy's Fruit Chunkies."

As of November 17, 2014, MTV has released two "best of" compilations on Amazon Video.

== Description ==
=== Premise ===
The two main characters are a black sock puppet named Sifl and a white sock puppet named Olly. Sifl is the calmer leader of the show, while Olly is more excitable and often breaks into crazed furies. Their assistant, Chester, is a mumbling, often nonsensical character who still claims to be great at everything.

The show was always very simple and low-budget. Most of the show's main characters were puppets, with background images or animations in the background via a chromakey. The two co-hosts often had a microphone in front of them. The show had an unscripted feel with the characters talking to each other in realistic, often meandering styles. Sifl and Olly would sing both original and classic songs throughout the show with an original song at the end. Though it featured puppets, the series was not intended for children. The humor often featured profanity, sexual references, drug innuendo, crude humor, bodily functions, and violence.

=== Regular segments ===
Often preceded by familiar intro screen and a short theme song, the segments included:

- Precious Roy's Home Shopping Network – a parody of the Home Shopping Network with bizarre products like Civil War corpses, CAT scan glasses, chicken flavored air conditioning, and a bottomless swimming pool. The network was run by Precious Roy who would yell random unrelated lines, ending with "...Suckers!". The slogan of Precious Roy was "making lots of suckers out of girls and boys." Sifl and Olly were employed as salesmen for the Network, and Olly inexplicably seemed to go progressively insane during these segments, often yelling crazed accusations at callers, and occasionally showing signs of paranoid schizophrenia.
- Calls from the Public – Sifl and Olly would take calls from random and often bizarre characters (usually sock puppets) who would call with problems or complaints. The most common calls coming from the pair's landlord, who would complain about one or more of their antics, often involving monkeys.
- Rock Facts – At commercial breaks, the Rock Facts question would be asked and answered when they returned. The answers were nearly always lies (the only exception being a fact about Queen Latifah) and often involved the singer Björk. This segment was dropped by the second season.
- Interview Time – Guests interviewed included Death, an atom, and G-spot & Orgasm. Sometimes they would announce a famous person that was going to be interviewed, but it would always turn out that the guest was unable to attend (unless the guest was in fact an inanimate object).
- S & O News – Sifl and Olly would pretend to report on the (generally surreal) news. Often Olly would sing nonsensical lyrics to accompany the lead in music (much to the chagrin of Sifl). Sifl, however, would break his professionalism during the segment to refer to his girlfriend, Serena Altschul, either by sending her a message or by praising her.
- A Word with Chester – Sifl and Olly would take a break from other show activities to speak with their friend Chester, who misinterpreted their questions and in general had difficulty focusing on any one subject for any extended period of time. Chester tends to laugh nervously, and sometimes sounds like he's a bit stoned. Olly took point in these segments, because Crocco, who provided the voice for Sifl, also provided the voice of Chester. In the second season, a new segment called "Letters to Chester" was added, which was essentially the same premise (including using the same theme music), with the addition of Olly reading a letter addressed to Chester at the start of the segment.
- And Now... ROCK – A song is performed by one or more of the characters
- It's Almost the End of the Show – Every episode ends with a song performed by Sifl and/or Olly, occasionally with vocal assistance by other characters.
- Kickin' It Old School – Introduced in the second season, a song from the "And Now... ROCK" or "It's Almost the End of the Show" segments is simply re-aired, occasionally with the pre-song banter cut out.

=== Characters ===
Sifl
Voiced by Matt Crocco. His body is a black sock with yellow, reptilian eyes and hair made out of green, plastic sunflower leaves. Sifl is often portrayed as the calm leader of the show. He is skilled at picking up women and is something of a technological whiz, capable of building and programming robots and somehow performing maintenance on a spacebound satellite without leaving the studio. Although a childhood friend of Olly, he is subtly manipulative and often deceives Olly or uses him as a scapegoat. He is often shown to have wasted the show's budget on mysterious ventures that are never described on screen, resulting in everything from guests canceling to mafia threats. An episode in the second season implies that he was once married to Olly's mom and is, in fact, Olly's father (despite also being a childhood friend of Olly).
Olly
Voice by Liam Lynch. His body is a white sock with large, brown eyes and a dog-like nose. His hair is made from clippings of plastic sunflower petal and he wears a sweater, or more specifically, a sweater sleeve. Olly is emotional and prone to fits of violence, and prone to bouts of total insanity during Precious Roy ads. During the Precious Roy ads, Olly's grammar shows characteristics of the Central Pennsylvania dialect. (He mentions both that a suit "never needs ironed" and that "the dog needs walked".) He is easily deceived and has difficulty with women. He has difficulty holding back his laughter at times, especially when he's talking with Chester. Olly originally performs "United States of Whatever," one of the most successful songs from Lynch's Fake Songs CD. The song was performed in response to Sifl bringing several of Olly's ex-girlfriends to the show so they could make fun of Olly.
Chester
Voiced by Matt Crocco. Chester was born in Las Vegas, raised by a tap dancing tribe (S1E1). A typical stoner, his head is an inverted rubber mould for a Buddha figurine, his eyelashes are plastic sunflower petals, and a sweater sleeve composes most of his body. This gives him a distinct shape, resulting in a vacant smile and the appearance of innards in his mouth. His eyes are the same as Olly's, with the addition of large, petal-like eyebrows. Chester announces the beginning of the show, though he is not skilled at the task, occasionally referring to Sifl & Olly by the wrong names (such as Starsky and Hutch), or simply refusing to perform the announcement. Usually laughs softly as he talks. Chester considers himself a Don Juan, though the other characters imply that Chester has never been with a woman. He is very forgetful, often forgetting that he lives in the studio, that he is on a television show, or that the fans in the "Letters to Chester" segments aren't in the studio. He is obsessed with cereal, and it is implied that he eats it constantly, though he is rarely seen doing so on screen. He collects water, which he proudly proclaims to possess the entire set of (in the form of ice, steam, and regular water). He occasionally wanders into other skits and often doesn't realize that the skits aren't real (such as thinking that he had wandered into space while entering the set of a Star Wars parody). He is occasionally sold or traded by Olly, such as being sold to a freak show for $20 or used to pay Sifl's debt to the mafia.
Precious Roy
Also voiced by Crocco. His body is a green sock with enormous eyes (pointing in different directions) and a pair of wire glasses. The puppeteer's hand is positioned awkwardly within the sock, adding to Precious' bizarre persona. He is the owner of the Precious Roy Home Shopping Network, which Sifl & Olly are spokesmen for. He speaks in non sequiturs, seems unaware of what his products actually are, and punctuates his last sentence of the segment with "suckers!".
Cody
Voiced by Liam Lynch. A friend of Sifl and Chester, but not so much Olly. Often Cody will stop by the show to confirm plans with Sifl for later; usually involving hookers or other unseemly behavior.
Stealth
Voiced by Liam Lynch. A violent degenerate with a grudge against Olly (Olly drove a golf cart through his bar mitzvah dressed in a beaver costume). Sifl and Olly eventually defeat him by singing Twisted Sister's "We're Not Gonna Take It", which somehow sends Stealth into space in a spinning square resembling the Phantom Zone in Superman II. Is perpetually smoking a cigarette because he claims that it makes you cool since you die young.
Julio
A small child who calls the show, usually to ask for advice. Liam Lynch mentioned on the "sockheads" list that Julio was voiced by a real 3-year-old named Julio.
Zafo
Voiced by guitarist/producer "Chris Tench". He spoke in an electronically distorted voice which sounds like a person speaking through a vocoder or a talk box. He is idolized by Sifl and Olly as well as a number of other characters in the show. On more than one occasion the world has been marked for destruction by a creature or object from space that was using the shows "Calls from the Public" forum to announce a final warning, leaving Sifl & Olly with a "big decision to make" when they discovered that Zafo had a show that night.
Peto and Flek
The main characters of Sifl and Olly's favorite show from their childhood. Peto is portrayed as being rude and vulgar, while Flek can only speak by saying the sound "guh-guh-guh-guh".
Jimmy
Voiced by Mike Taylor. Sifl & Olly's camera man, his dialogue usually cannot be heard clearly and he rarely appears on screen.
The Landlord
Voiced by Liam Lynch. The landlord for Sifl & Olly's apartment (some episodes, however, imply that the duo actually live in their studio. It is possible that they simply tape their show in their apartment, but some segments clearly imply that the two are "not home" during taping). He is made out of an opaque brown stocking with grey yarn hair and eyebrows. He also has a tattered white sleeve covering most of his body, giving him a disheveled appearance. This is enhanced by the puppeteer, whose knuckles are positioned prominently in the puppet, increasing its aggressive appearance. The Landlord frequently calls during the "Calls from the Public" segments to yell at Sifl and Olly about something they're doing on his property, such as breeding monkeys or building a water slide. He threatens to kick them out regularly, but the duo has already built a moat around their apartment filled with crocodiles and guarded by archer monkeys.
Champs 1 Team
A group of students, led by "John from Ohio University," who won the "Sifl & Olly: Free Access to the Moon" contest, in which they were launched in a space ship to the moon for a three-year mission. However, they weren't given any tasks to perform during their mission, and Sifl & Olly assumed the team would simply enjoy the freedom of being on the moon, such as the fact that there are no police on the moon. Before long all of the crew has died but one member, who eventually dies after the robot chicken pecks at a wrong button and sends the ship into the sun.
Grout
Voiced by Matt Crocco. A black and white striped long stocking with round yellow eyes on what look like black pipe cleaners. He is a self-proclaimed space expert who shows up as a guest or as host of his game show, trivia trapezoids.
Paul Rogers
Voiced by Matt Crocco. Disgruntled host of 'Functions of the Family', "Your 8000 step plan to better living". Intended as a self-help plan, he apparently went through some bad events recently. As such, his show generally devolves within seconds to him crying about his current situation in life, (specifically "I DON'T HAVE A FAMILY!") and screaming at his unseen announcer, Dale. The typical episode ends with Dale quitting. Paul is one of the few non-sock puppet characters, played by a plastic elf hand puppet.
Aesop Jones
A television chef, and another of the few non-sock characters (he is simply a doll dressed like a chef). Aesop's speech is incomprehensible. All his cooking endeavors seem to involve him actually cooking himself, somehow transforming his actual body into whatever it was he was supposed to be cooking (such as covering himself in dough, dipping his head into a vat of lard, and emerging with his head as a perfect, chocolate frosted doughnut). In the second season he has a female assistant (made out of a sock) whom he is romantically involved with.
Jargon Scott
A salesperson who often turns up on the "Calls From the Public" portion of the show to try and sell legless dogs to Sifl and Olly. Jargon constantly tries to explain to them the benefits of owning legless dogs, such as: they never run away, you never have to walk them, they're safe around children, etc. When this doesn't convince them to buy, he often enlists the help of a telemarketer named Cindy to use typical telemarketing fast talk and special offers to trick them into buying his "hot, legless dogs." The call usually ends with Jargon interrupting Cindy, exclaiming "You guys don't know what you're missing...I got legless dogs here!"
Eddie from Jersey
Frequent caller during the "Calls From The Public" segment of the show. Eddie can be seen wearing a S&M-style mask and always makes it a point to insult Sifl, usually by calling him a variation of the term "egg-ass" (i.e. "Hey Sifl, you're a rotten, slouched-back, egg-ass!"). Once he is reminded that he can be seen, he usually attempts to hide or change his story.
Sex Girl
Voiced by Terry Hudson. A female prostitute who occasionally shows up in the Interview section of the show. After a brief talk, usually Sifl and Olly decide to make out with Sex Girl. Sifl usually goes first, making awkward noises and distracting Olly, while Olly always blows his chance with Sex Girl giving lines such as "Everything I'm about to do to you baby, I learned at Seaworld."
Deuce Loosely
Voiced by Liam Lynch. An insane caller who wears a panda mask, he is utterly obsessed about pandas whenever he appears. He seems to think pandas are magical beings, that are unstoppable vicious beasts. He is constantly hated by Sifl and Olly during his appearances, who find him annoying, and despise his blatantly false panda "facts". He has performed two songs about pandas in the show, (one in the first season, and one in the recent revival), and he claims they "will cease at number 820".
Cereal Mascots
A collection of rejected cereal mascots allowed to pitch their cereals again in episode 1-06. Includes Modem Mutt of Suger Coated Cyber Flakes (Download a bowl into your stomach today! It's good to the last megabyte and that's free surfing in fiber space!), Bing the Chlorinator of Watertower Nuggets (Great Cereal, a little high chlorine, kinda dangerous, but good though.), Eddie from Rubber Fantasies (Eddie from Jersey, immediately cut off by Sifl), Sugar Bunny of Super Sugar Carrots (They got real sugar!), Breakfast Beaver of Carpenter Crunch (Two scoops of nails in every bag. This cereal comes in a bag), Rascal Rooster of Raisin Hell (A million raisins in every can!)

== Fanbase ==
Fans of the show call themselves "sockheads". There is also an online group of Sifl and Olly video traders that are petitioning MTV to release the entire series on DVD. One group of fans even recorded a tribute CD recreating some of their favorite songs called Banging on Some Pots and Pans. The Sockheads mailing list group also organized a convention in Nashville called Cresvention.

Cartoonist Aaron McGruder is a fan of the show. On one episode of his TV show The Boondocks, Huey exclaims to his grandfather's girlfriend that he is doing "prostitute laundry", which could be a direct reference to Sifl and Olly's song of the same name. A strip published on 4/28/00 also references the show, where character Michael Caesar is seen lamenting its cancellation. Award-winning writer J. Michael Straczynski was also a noted fan of the show, and at one time Lynch and Crocco were planning a sock puppet character voiced by Straczynski until the show was cancelled.

== Sifl and Olly Video Game Reviews ==
In 2012, it was teased by Liam Lynch, via Twitter, that Sifl and Olly may return. On September 2, 2012, a promo appeared on the Machinima YouTube channel for a new show called Sifl & Olly Video Game Reviews. The first episode premiered on September 9, 2012. After the credits of the eighth video game review episode which aired on October 28, 2012, it was announced that Sifl & Olly were being moved to the Nerdist YouTube Channel. One "season," consisting of 5 episodes, was made available on that channel in 2013, ending April 18.

== Video game ==
In July 2018, it was reported that American video game publisher Devolver Digital was in talks with The Sifl and Olly Show intellectual property owner Lynch to create a video game based on the show's license.
