= John Baker (Radiophonic musician) =

British musician and composer (1937–1997)

- Born: John William Baker; 12 October 1937; Leigh-on-Sea, Essex, England
- Died: 7 February 1997 (aged 59); Freshwater, Isle of Wight, England
- Occupations: Musician, composer

John William Baker (12 October 1937 in Leigh-on-Sea – 7 February 1997 in Freshwater, Isle of Wight) was a British musician and composer who worked in jazz and electronic music.

Baker was educated at the Royal Academy of Music where he studied piano and composition. In 1960 he joined the BBC as a sound mixer, before transferring, in 1963, to the BBC Radiophonic Workshop where he remained until 1974. He was the most prolific of the early Workshop composers, developing a trademark style, creating music by manipulating tapes of everyday sounds such as blowing across the top of an empty bottle. A rare snippet of Baker at work was included in the 1968 documentary film Music, which also featured the Beatles working on Hey Jude in the studio. A jazz pianist, he brought a sense of rhythm to the Workshop which some of the other more mathematical composers lacked. His work included many signature tunes for BBC television and radio, including Many a Slip, PM and BBC English by Radio. He was also particularly interested in combining recorded electronic music with live musicians.

After struggling with alcoholism, Baker recorded no further music after being sacked by the Radiophonic Workshop in 1974. He died from liver cancer in 1997.

Two compilations of his work entitled The John Baker Tapes were released in July 2008 by Trunk Records.
