= Jonny Trunk =

British writer, broadcaster and DJ

- Born: Jonathan Benton-Hughes; United Kingdom
- Education: RGS Guildford
- Occupations: Music executive, author, broadcaster, producer, Trunk Records (owner)
- Spouse: Lilla Hurst
- Children: 2 sons
- Website: www.trunkrecords.com

Jonny Trunk, born Jonathan Benton-Hughes, is an English writer, broadcaster and DJ as well as the owner and founder of Trunk Records.

== Career ==
=== Trunk Records ===
Jonny Trunk founded Trunk Records in 1995, a cult British label that specialises in film music, library music, early electronics and exotic, nostalgic recordings. It was the first label to release music from cult horror films such as The Wicker Man.

On his label he has also released Dirty Fan Male, an album based on his own experiences organising various glamour models' fan clubs including that of his sister, Emma Benton-Hughes, who modelled under the name Eve Vorley. The album contained amusing recitals of the fan mail they received, and was later turned into an award-winning live show and a book, with the album getting 4/5 stars from The Guardian.

Trunk has also released his own material through the label, including his album The Inside Outside. Since 2003, Trunk has been responsible for the rediscovery of Basil Kirchin, by releasing his unknown 1960s experimental jazz and soundtrack work.

"The Ladies' Bras", a single by Jonny Trunk and Wisbey, made number 70 on the UK Singles Chart in August 2007, and re-entered at number 27 in September 2007 after a campaign by BBC Radio 1's Scott Mills and Danny Baker. At 36 seconds long, it is the shortest track ever to chart in the top 30.

=== Directing, teaching ===
Various Jonny Trunk side projects have included directing the now-banned pop video "Plug Me In" for Add N to (X). This video was shot in Wales, and was edited as the standard pop version and a longer, more controversial Add N To XXX 45 minute version.

Trunk has also held modern music and movement classes using vintage electronic recordings, issued official Tony Hart Vision On tee shirts and screenprints, ran action painting sessions to Ken Nordine's colours, and regularly finds music for advertising, film and TV.

In recent years Trunk has been lecturing at art colleges throughout the UK. His talks focus on the art of creativity based on nostalgia, enthusiasm and cunning.

=== Broadcasting ===
Trunk is also a regular broadcaster on London's art radio station Resonance FM. His long-running radio show OST has concentrated on film music, TV music, library music and related recordings since 2003 until 2022 and is the only show of its kind on British radio. It has championed the work of François de Roubaix, Roger Roger (composer), Krzysztof Komeda and many other obscure international soundtrack and library artists. Other recent broadcasting has included the BBC Radio 4 documentary Into The Music Library and presenting on BBC Two's The Culture Show. Trunk was the first dedicated film music DJ in the UK.

=== Writing, publishing ===
HarperCollins published the Jonny Trunk book Dirty Fan Male in 2005. It subsequently became a Channel 4 documentary.

He also writes for Vice, Record Collector, and Mojo.

Working with art publishers FUEL Design, Jonny Trunk published the world's first and only book dedicated to the graphic art of production library music on Trunk Records. This book, known as The Music Library, was the first book to bring to the public the hidden art and design of vintage library recordings. The book was expanded in 2016.

The original "Music Library" book was followed up in 2010 with Dressing for Pleasure in Rubber, Vinyl and Leather: The Best of Atomage 1972-1980, about AtomAge.

2011 saw the publication of Own Label, Sainsbury's Design Studio 1962 - 1977. This book brought together a vast array of own label packaging developed and designed by the supermarket's in house studio. Conceived by Jonny Trunk and based on his memory of the 1975 Own Label Cornflake packet, the book brings some 400+ rare, period and often curious designs from the Sainsbury's Archive into the modern graphic world.

Trunk licensed the document and letter archive of Mary Whitehouse based at the University of Essex, and made a deal with publishers Faber and Faber. The book based on this material, Ban This Filth! Letters From the Mary Whitehouse Archive (2012), was edited by Ben Thompson.

2014 saw the publication of "The Art Of Smallfilms", a book exploring the archives of Smallfilms and the world of Oliver Postgate and Peter Firmin. The book is the first to examine their work in minute detail. It was conceived and edited by Jonny Trunk and has a foreword by Stewart Lee.

Trunk also features frequently in the 2011 book Retromania by Simon Reynolds: "Cheezy sleaze and sepia–toned melancholy seem unlikely bedfellows at first glance. But in his 1935 travel book Journey Without Maps, Graham Greene put his finger on or near the place where musty and lustful meet. He wrote about how ‘seediness has a very deep appeal…it seems to satisfy, temporarily, the sense of nostalgia for something lost; it seems to represent a stage further back.’ With their aura of wistful reverie and faded decay, the sounds exhumed by Trunk offer a portal into Britain's cultural unconscious."

== See also ==
- Trunk Records

== Bibliography ==
- Dirty Fan Male, HarperCollins. ISBN 978-0-00-720772-5
- The Music Library, FUEL, ISBN 0-9550061-1-2
- Dressing For Pleasure, FUEL, ISBN 978-0-9563562-3-9
- Own Label, FUEL, ISBN 978-0-9563562-8-4
- The Art Of Smallfilms, Four Corners Books, ISBN 978-1-9098290-2-2
