= Duncan Wisbey =

English actor (born 1971)

- Born: Duncan James Wisbey; 16 December 1971 (age 54); Sheffield, South Yorkshire, England
- Education: Royal Central School of Speech and Drama
- Occupations: Actor, voice over artist, writer, musician

Duncan James Wisbey (born 16 December 1971) is an English actor, voice over artist, musician, writer and impressionist. He is often credited as simply Wisbey.

== Recordings and appearances ==
From 2001, Wisbey collaborated with Jonny Trunk, founder of Trunk Records, to produce the album Dirty Fan Male, based on Trunk's experiences organising glamour models' fan clubs. The album comprises Wisbey's amusing recitals of the fan mail they received, and it was later turned into an acclaimed live show and a book.

The inclusion of Wisbey's song "The Ladies' Bras" on the 2007 compilation album Now We Are Ten and its appearances on The All Day Breakfast Show proved so successful that it was released as a single and became the shortest single ever to enter the UK Singles Chart, following a campaign on BBC Radio 1 by Scott Mills. At 36 seconds long, it became the shortest song ever to make the UK Singles Chart, reaching number 27 in September 2007.

Wisbey has also appeared as an actor in several Doctor Who audio adventures, made by Big Finish Productions, and voiced Perky in The Pinky and Perky Show.

== Radio and television ==
In television, Wisbey performed in and contributed to the writing of Alistair McGowan's Big Impression. He is also the voice of the character Migo in The Roly Mo Show. In 2005 he appeared as himself in the documentary Dirty Fan Male about his live comedy show of the same name. Other parts have included appearances in the Peak Practice and The Bill series.

In radio, Wisbey has appeared in BBC productions Trapped, Undone, The Secret World and Go 4 It. Wisbey also appeared in the fifth installment of the popular series Wrong Turn 5: Bloodlines, as a character named "Mose". Wisbey also writes for and performs in Dead Ringers (especially the musical items).

Wisbey has also appeared as Doctor Brain in the CBBC game show Ultimate Brain, and voiced several characters in the CBeebies animated series Tree Fu Tom. He is also the narrator on the Channel 4 B&B programme, Four in a Bed in 2015.

In 2022, he appeared as the recurring character Martin in Catherine Tate's six-part mockumentary sitcom Hard Cell, released on Netflix.

== Writing ==
From 2002, Wisbey contributed to the writing of stage versions of the Dick Barton adventure serial, which he also performed in. He is the author of the book Young Dick Barton - The Making of a Legend.

== Musical work ==
In the theatre, Wisbey has worked closely as a musical director, arranger, and sometimes composer alongside the award-winning director, Rufus Norris, on three productions for the Young Vic Theatre Company. The first, Sleeping Beauty, ran at the Young Vic itself in 2002, then transferred to the Barbican and then to the New Victory on Broadway. Hergé's Adventures of Tintin which premiered at the Barbican two years later, followed by a tour run in 2007. The other production was the World Premier of Tanya Ronder's acclaimed adaptation of the book Vernon God Little.

On 13 September 2019, Wisbey opened Tony Hawks new musical comedy Midlife Cowboy at the Pleasance Theatre in Islington, London, playing the role of Graham, alongside Debra Stephenson.
