= Julian Dutton =

British comedian

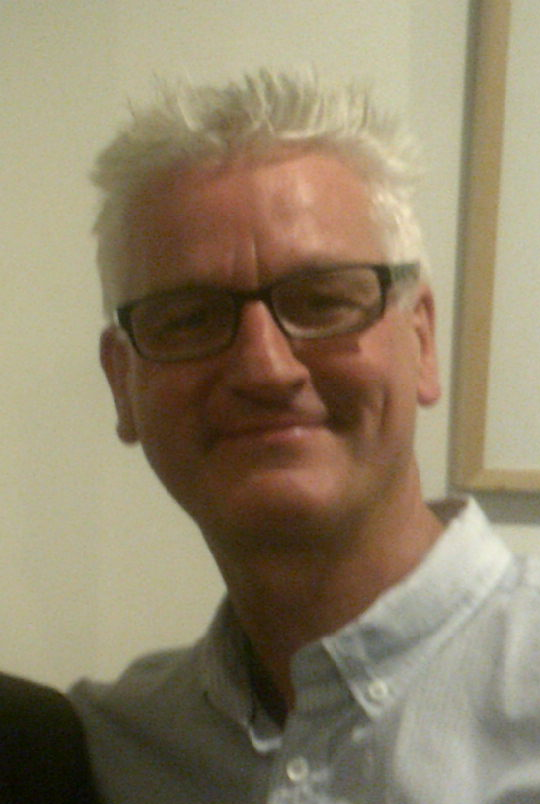
- Dutton in 2015
- Born: London, England
- Occupations: Comedian, screenwriter

Julian Dutton is an English writer and performer. He is principally known for television and radio, whose work has won a British Comedy Award, a BAFTA, and a Radio Academy Gold Award for Best Comedy. He is the author of eight books.

He is the co-creator and co-writer of the BBC2 comedy series Pompidou starring Matt Lucas, the first visual comedy TV series to be made since Rowan Atkinson's Mr. Bean.

Described as one of "the best vocal performers around," (BBC Comedy) he was one of the driving forces behind the hit BBC One comedy show The Big Impression with Alistair McGowan, and has also written and starred in several of his own series on BBC Radio 4, as well as writing extensively for many other TV and radio shows. His series Truly, Madly, Bletchley was described by The Independent on Sunday as "The most confident new sitcom since The Navy Lark", and Time Out praised his series The Harpoon, written with Peter Baynham, as having achieved "classic status."

His children's sitcom Scoop for CBBC, which Dutton wrote and performed in, ran for 3 series of 39 episodes between 2009 & 2011, and the hit impressions show "The Secret World," written with Bill Dare, in which Dutton performs alongside star impressionists Jon Culshaw, Lewis Macleod, Duncan Wisbey and Jess Robinson, ran for four series. The show was described by the Daily Express as "...definitely one of the funniest things I've heard on R4 for a while," and on 12 May 2014 won the Radio Academy Gold Award for Best Comedy.

He is the author of eight books: the historical travelogue Shakespeare's Journey Home: a Traveller's Guide through Elizabethan England, Are We All Here?, a collection of humorous articles about the world's most eccentric clubs, some of which were previously published in the Independent on Sunday Talk of the Town magazine, Keeping Quiet: Visual Comedy in the Age of Sound, published by Chaplin Books, April 2015,, a humorous book for children, The Secret Diary of Samuel Pepys, aged Ten & Three Quarters. His fifth book, Water Gypsies: a history of life on Britain's Rivers & Canals was published in April 2021 by The History Press, inspired by his childhood on a houseboat on the River Thames at Chelsea. His sixth book, The Parade's Gone By: Everyday life in Britain in the twentieth century, a social history of the modern era based on a series of diaries discovered by the author's father, was published in 2023 by Furnival Books. His seventh book, published in 2024, is a comedy joke book My Town, My Rules: the Diaries of Britain's Greatest Councillor, and his novel Old Man Out was published by Everyman Humour in 2025.

In 2014 he was part of the team representing Leeds University in the Christmas edition of University Challenge.

In 2018 he wrote and performed a one-man stage tribute to the actor John Le Mesurier, "Do You Think That's Wise?" which he took to the Edinburgh Fringe festival in August and which toured the UK 2019-21, with a West End run in London in April & May 2020.

In 2020 he embarked on a UK stage tour of his own adaptation of Roy Clarke's sitcom Last of the Summer Wine, a one-man impressions show, but the UK tour was cancelled owing to COVID-19. He revived both these impressions shows in 2023 and performs them extensively onboard cruise ships worldwide for P&O.

== Early career ==
Born in central London, Dutton grew up in Marlow, Buckinghamshire, attending Reading Blue Coat School and Great Marlow School.

Like Alistair McGowan, Dutton attended the University of Leeds where he studied English and History, whilst performing with the University Theatre Group. After leaving university he began work as an actor, touring with his own theatre company and writing and performing in his own play The Candidate at the New End Theatre, Hampstead.

Early professional work included touring working men's clubs in the Midlands and North of England with a variety show; appearances in the West End with Charlton Heston and Ben Cross in The Caine Mutiny Court-Martial; and a national tour with Ralph Bates in Alan Ayckbourn's Absent Friends.

Dutton then aged several decades to portray 'Morganhall', the eccentric barrister in John Mortimer's comic two-hander The Dock Brief, performed with Canadian actor Jonathan Hartman.

He also toured Europe in productions of The Taming of the Shrew and The Importance of Being Earnest, appearing in Rotterdam, Cologne, Antwerp and Amsterdam; as well as TV appearances in Tucker's Luck, The Bill, Dempsey and Makepeace and Rockliffe's Babies.

== Comedy, stand-up and radio ==
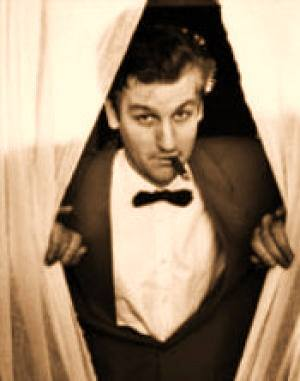
Julian Dutton as stand-up & impressionist.

In the early 1990s he turned from the theatre to comedy, performing an impressionist act on the stand-up circuit in London, and at this time began writing comedy shows for BBC Radio, including Week Ending which he worked on with Peter Baynham, Richard Herring, Stewart Lee, Harry Hill, Ben Moor, Armando Iannucci, Harry Thompson, and Sarah Smith; and The News Huddlines, Roy Hudd's weekly topical sketch show. As well as performing cabaret on the club circuit, from 1991 to 1997 he wrote more than eighty half-hour radio comedy shows, including The Harpoon, the latter jointly with Peter Baynham and starring himself with Alistair McGowan, Peter Baynham, Susie Brann and Mary Elliot-Nelson. Three series of The Harpoon were broadcast, plus two Christmas specials, all produced by Sarah Smith, from 1991 to 1993. During this time Dutton also dramatised and performed in six P. G. Wodehouse stories for BBC Radio 4, Ukridge, in which Griff Rhys Jones played the eponymous anti-hero, starring alongside Robert Bathurst.

The following year, in 1994, he was given his own series, Truly, Madly, Bletchley, which he wrote and starred in, along with David Battley, Liz Fraser, Simon Godley and Toby Longworth. Truly, Madly, Bletchley, produced by Dirk Maggs, was the first sketch show in the history of radio comedy to have been written by one person – apart from Harry Hill's Fruit Corner, which was being broadcast at the same time and which Dutton also performed in. Other radio comedy shows Dutton performed in include Ian Hislop & Nick Newman's series Gush, Mammon, and The Christopher Marlowe Mysteries.

As a result of his radio work Dutton won the BBC Radio Comedy Writers Bursary (then known as the Peter Titheradge Award) along with Richard Herring and Stewart Lee. At this period he was touring widely as a stand-up comedian, supporting Harry Hill in the West End, and performing with Al Murray, Jim Tavare and Jenny Eclair.

In 2009 Dutton wrote and performed two new radio comedy series, Inside Alan Francis, with fellow comedian and actor Alan Francis, and a new radio impressions show, The Secret World, produced by Bill Dare, in which Dutton performed alongside star impressionists Jon Culshaw, Lewis Macleod, Duncan Wisbey and Jess Robinson. The Secret World won the Radio Academy Gold Award in 2014, the judges saying that 'the greatest joy of The Secret World was in the sharpness of the writing and the highly entertaining performances. This wasn't just satire. It was satire with great imagination.'

== TV comedy ==
Dutton's early TV appearances include The Bill, Rockcliffe's Babies, Juliet Bravo, and in the 1990s The Bore of the Year Awards, in which he appeared in sketches with Peter Cook and John Sessions, Time Gentlemen Please, Al Murray's sitcom for Sky, and Does China Exist?, performing with Paul Merton. Dutton was also cast in many TV commercials, including playing the new Secret Lemonade Drinker in adverts with Ronnie Corbett, Frankie Howerd, and John McEnroe. He was also cast as the Canon Man in the copier ads.

In 2000 he co-created, wrote and performed in Alistair McGowan's Big Impression, later to be renamed The Big Impression, which was BBC One's first sketch show for many years and their first impressions show since Mike Yarwood's. The show, produced by Charlie Hanson, proved a massive hit: in addition to writing the series Dutton was one of the supporting performers along with Ronni Ancona, Alan Francis, Roger Blake and Duncan Wisbey, and performed impressions of, among others, Dustin Hoffman, John Le Mesurier and James Stewart. He wrote and performed in four series of the show and two Christmas Specials, and won a British Comedy Award in 2001, and a BAFTA. A spin-off series, Ronni Ancona & Co was commissioned in 2007, which Dutton wrote with Ancona, Alan Francis and Alex Lowe.

Dutton also wrote extensively for children's television, including the sketch shows Spoof and Driving Me Mad, the long-running legendary sitcom ChuckleVision, and the CBBC sitcom Scoop, which ran for three series of 39 episodes.

As one of the lead writers on Chucklevision Dutton was commissioned to create and write a pilot for a new CBBC sitcom, Little Chucks, the adventures of Paul and Barry Chuckle as children, broadcast in 2010. This became the last episode of Chucklevision to be broadcast, in the final series.

Other television appearances include the Emmy Award-nominated My Life as a Popat for ITV, The Sarah Jane Adventures, a Doctor Who spin-off for CBBC produced by Russell T Davies, Nuzzle and Scratch, a children's comedy series, and Scoop with Shaun Williamson.

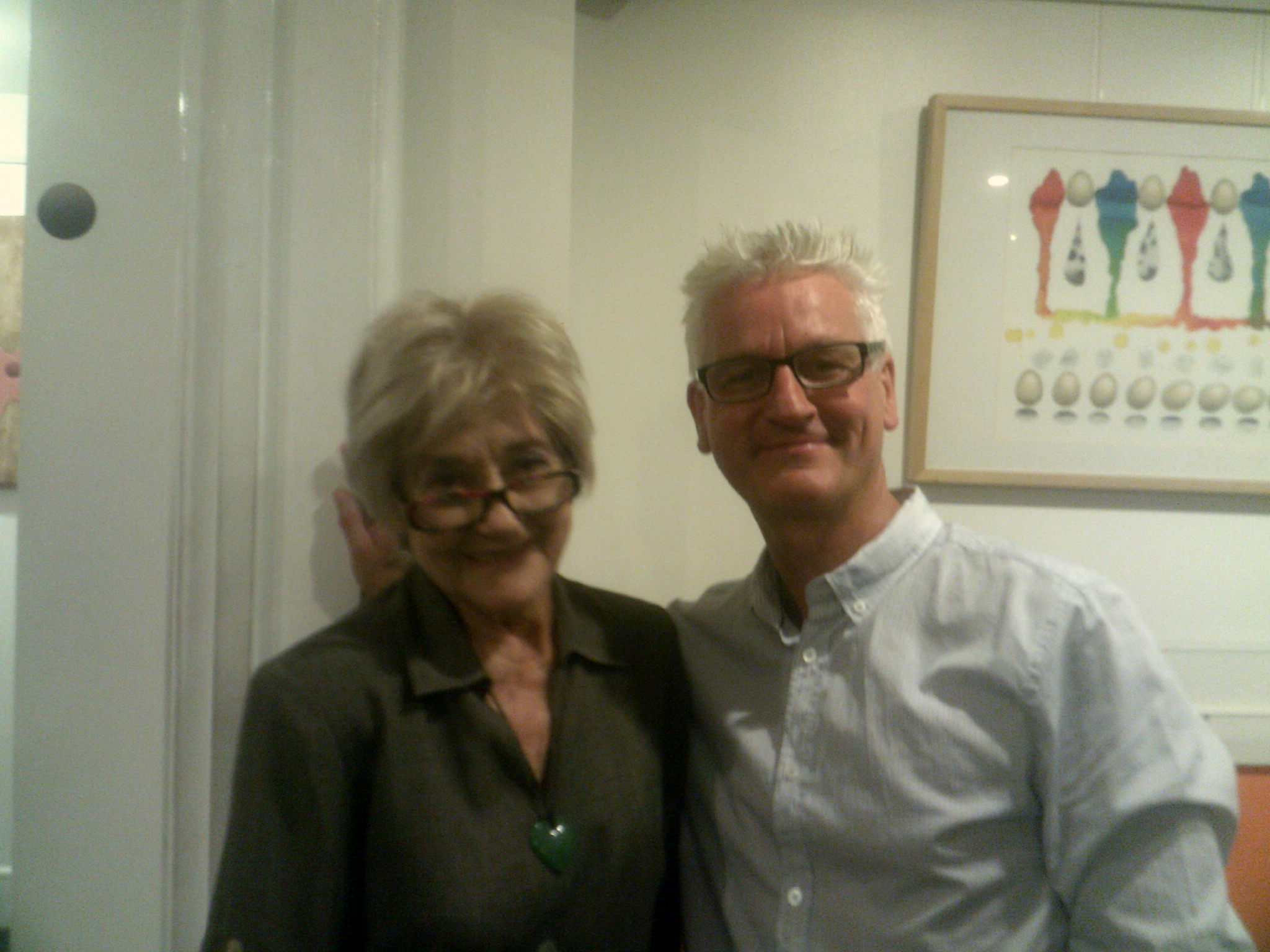
Julian Dutton with actress Liz Fraser August 2015

A lifelong fan of silent comedy, in 2012 Dutton began developing an all-visual TV comedy show with comedian Matt Lucas and producer Ashley Blaker, with Lucas' own company, John Stanley Productions. They created and co-wrote a pilot script which they delivered to the BBC in December 2012, and a 6-part series was commissioned for BBC 2. The first all-visual TV series since Rowan Atkinson's Mr. Bean, Pompidou was an experimental series aiming to revive visual comedy for the twenty-first century, and create a show that would appeal to international audiences. Pompidou broadcast in 192 countries on Netflix.

== Politics ==
Dutton is an active member of the Liberal Democrats, identifying as a classical liberal. In May 2017 he was selected as candidate for the local elections in his constituency of Llandovery, which he lost to Plaid Cymru, the dominant party in that area of Wales. On the right of the party, he is a supporter of Orange Book liberalism, a combination of social progressivism and libertarian economics.

== Personal ==
Dutton has two children, Jack and Florence. He owns property on the Italian Riviera where he lives in Sanremo with his partner Siwsan Williams, dividing his time between Italy & Wales.

== Radio series as a writer and performer ==
- Week Ending
- The News Huddlines
- Mackay the New
- Flying the Flag
- The Christopher Marlowe Mysteries
- The Harpoon
- Struck Off and Die
- Truly, Madly, Bletchley
- Harry Hill's Fruit Corner
- Gush - Radio Series
- Mammon
- The Oldest Member
- Ukridge
- Richard Barton, General Practitioner
- Inside Alan Francis
- The Secret World
- Les Kelly's Britain
- Brian Gulliver's Travels
- Reception
- Doctor Who: UNIT Dominion
- Lewis Macleod is Not Himself
- Polyoaks
- Please Use Other Door

== TV Series as a writer and performer ==
- The Bill
- Dempsey and Makepeace
- The Gentle Touch
- Rockliffe's Babies
- Tucker's Luck
- Friday Night Armistice
- Jim Tavare Presents
- Does China Exist?
- Bore of the Year Awards
- Time Gentlemen Please
- The Big Impression
- Ronni Ancona & Co
- My Life as a Popat
- The Stephen K. Amos Show
- ChuckleVision
- Driving Me Mad
- Spoof - CBBC
- The Sarah Jane Adventures
- Coronation Street
- Scoop
- Pompidou (TV series)
- Little People

== Books ==
- Shakespeare's Journey Home: a Traveller's Guide Through Elizabethan England
- Keeping Quiet: Visual Comedy in the Age of Sound
- The Secret Diary of Samuel Pepys, aged ten & three quarters (children's novel)
- Are We All Here? - a Journey Through the World's Most Curious Clubs
- Water Gypsies: a History of Life on Britain's Rivers & Canals
- The Parade's Gone By: everyday life in Britain in the twentieth century
- 100 ways to write a Book - 100 authors in conversation with Alex Pearl about their backgrounds, motivations and working methods
- My Town, My Rules: the Diaries of Britain's Greatest Councillor
- Old Man Out (fiction)
