= List of BBC Radio programmes adapted for television =

Many BBC radio comedy programmes have been successful enough for the writers and performers to adapt them into television programmes. Unless otherwise stated these programmes were originally broadcast on BBC Radio 4, and then broadcast on one of the BBC's TV channels. The following list gives some of the more notable ones.

Radio version	Television version	Notes
Sean Lock’s 15 Minutes of Misery / Sean Lock: 15 Storeys High	15 Storeys High
Absolute Power	Absolute Power
An Actor's Life For Me	An Actor's Life For Me	BBC Radio 2 programme turned BBC1 sitcom
After Henry	After Henry	BBC Radio 4 programme turned ITV sitcom
Annika Stranded	Annika
The Boosh	The Mighty Boosh
Blue Jam	Jam	BBC Radio 1 radio production. Channel 4 television production.
The Clitheroe Kid	The Clitheroe Kid
Count Arthur Strong's Radio Show!	Count Arthur Strong
Dave Hollins: Space Cadet sketches in Son of Cliché	Red Dwarf	Many changes.
Dead Ringers	Dead Ringers
The Enchanting World of Hinge and Bracket	Dear Ladies	BBC Radio 4 (1977–1979) to BBC Two television sitcom (1983–1985)
Delve Special	This is David Lander, This is David Harper	Broadcast on Channel 4
Fist of Fun	Fist of Fun	Broadcast on BBC Radio 1
Genius	Genius
The Goon Show	Telegoons
Goodness Gracious Me	Goodness Gracious Me	Radio version was funded by BBC TV in the hopes the series would eventually transfer to television.
Hancock's Half Hour	Hancock's Half Hour, Hancock
The Hitchhiker's Guide to the Galaxy	The Hitchhiker's Guide to the Galaxy
I'm Sorry I Haven't a Clue	I'm Sorry I Haven't a Clue	Unaired pilot
I've Never Seen Star Wars	I've Never Seen Star Wars
Just a Minute	Just a Minute	Unaired pilots and both ITV (1994–1995) and BBC1 (1999, 2012) series.
Knowing Me, Knowing You	Knowing Me, Knowing You
Life With The Lyons	Life With The Lyons
Little Britain	Little Britain
Miranda Hart’s joke shop	Miranda	The radio version was based on a semi-autobiographical TV pilot
That Mitchell and Webb Sound	That Mitchell and Webb Look	The TV version was made in January 2006 and started airing in September.
Naked Radio	Naked Video	Naked Radio was first broadcast on BBC Radio Scotland
The News Quiz	Have I Got News For You	Many changes. It is disputed whether HIGNFY is actually based on TNQ or not. Former News Quiz panellist Ian Hislop is now a panellist on HIGNFY
On The Hour	The Day Today
On the Town with The League of Gentlemen	The League of Gentlemen	Moved from town of Spent to Royston Vasey.
People Like Us	People Like Us
Radio Active	KYTV
Room 101	Room 101	Broadcast on Radio 5
Second Thoughts	Second Thoughts	BBC Radio Four radio series transferred to ITV
Whose Line Is It Anyway?	Whose Line Is It Anyway?	Broadcast on Channel 4
Victoria Derbyshire	Victoria Derbyshire (TV programme)

== Television to radio transfers ==
Some television series transfer in the other direction. Both the science fiction series Doctor Who and Blake's 7 have become short-lived radio series. Several comedies, such as To the Manor Born (in 1997) and One Foot in the Grave, have also been transferred.

As another example, in 2004 the Andy Hamilton comedy Trevor's World of Sport transferred to Radio 4. Having largely failed in its television incarnation, it was felt the older medium might suit it better. This would seem to create the impression that, whereas popular radio shows are "promoted" to television, an unpopular television show was being "demoted" to radio. However, public opinion on the radio series has been mostly positive, suggesting that it was a good decision.

Television version	Radio version	Notes
All Gas and Gaiters	All Gas and Gaiters
Blake's 7	Blake's 7
Dad's Army	Dad's Army
Dr. Finlay's Casebook	Dr. Finlay's Casebook & The Adventures of a Black Bag
Doctor Who	Doctor Who
Mastermind	Mastermind
One Foot in the Grave	One Foot in the Grave
Steptoe and Son	Steptoe and Son
To the Manor Born	To the Manor Born
Trevor's World of Sport	Trevor's World of Sport
Yes Minister	Yes Minister

== Radio programmes transferred to independent television ==
- A few early game shows from Radio Luxembourg transferred to ITV, when it started broadcasting in 1955. This included Take Your Pick and Double Your Money.

== See also ==
- List of television series made into books
