= The Secret Rapture =

The Secret Rapture may refer to:

- The Secret Rapture (play), a 1988 play by David Hare
- The Secret Rapture (film), a 1993 film adapted from the above play
- The first stage of the Rapture in Christian eschatology, before the rise of the Antichrist
