= Susan Jeffers =

Susan Jeffers may refer to

- Susan Jeffers (psychologist) (1938–2012), American author of Feel the Fear and Do It Anyway
- Susan Jeffers (illustrator) (1942–2020), American children's book illustrator
- Sue Jeffers (born 1956), American restaurateur and politician
