= And the Winner Is =

And the Winner Is may refer to:

- And the Winner Is (radio series), a British radio comedy program
- And the Winner Is... (Chubb Rock album), 1989
- And the Winner Is... (Selena y Los Dinos album), 1987
- "And the Winner Is..." (Benson), an episode of the American television series Benson
- "And the Winner Is..." (The Legend of Korra), an episode of the American animated television series The Legend of Korra
- "And the Winner Is..." (Rugrats), an episode of the American animated television series Rugrats
- "And the Winner Is... (The Oscars of 1963)", an episode of the American television series Feud
- "And the Wiener Is...", an episode of the animated comedy series Family Guy
- And the Winner Is..., a children's book by American rapper, actor, author, and entrepreneur LL Cool J, published in 2002
