= Pompidou (TV series) =

Television series

- Genre: Comedy
- Created by: Matt Lucas; Julian Dutton; Ashley Blaker
- Written by: Matt Lucas; Julian Dutton; Ashley Blaker; Jon Foster; James Lamont
- Directed by: Charlie Hanson; Matt Lucas
- Starring: Matt Lucas; Alex Macqueen
- Country of origin: United Kingdom
- Original language: English
- No. of series: 1
- No. of episodes: 6

Production
- Executive producers: Layla Smith; Matt Lucas
- Producers: Charlie Hanson; Katie Mavroleon
- Production locations: Langleybury, Hertfordshire
- Editor: Jon Blow
- Running time: 25-30 minutes
- Production companies: Netflix; John Stanley Productions

Original release
- Network: BBC Two
- Release: 1 March – 5 April 2015

Related
- Little Britain

Pompidou is a British television comedy series for BBC Two created and written by comedian Matt Lucas with Julian Dutton, Ashley Blaker, James Foster, and Jon Lamont. It began airing on 1 March 2015 on BBC Two.

Produced by Lucas' own company John Stanley Productions for the BBC, Pompidou is the first all-visual, i.e. having no meaningful dialogue, half-hour mainstream TV sitcom since Bradley in the late 1980s. (Although several visual comedies have been broadcast in the interim, none of these were half-hour sitcoms: Mr. Bean usually consisted of two or three sketches, Oddbods was a one-off, The Baldy Man consisted of two sketches per episode, and Uncle Max and Zzzap! were both 15-minute children's shows.)

A pilot was written in 2012, and 6 episodes were commissioned by Controller of BBC One Danny Cohen and Controller of Comedy Commissioning Shane Allen in Spring 2013. The series was written and filmed across 2013 and 2014. The first episode aired on BBC Two on 1 March 2015.

Inspired by Charlie Chaplin, Morph, Laurel and Hardy, Pingu, Buster Keaton, Jacques Tati, and Marty Feldman, Pompidou aimed to reinvent visual comedy for the 21st century and create an international series for a global audience.

== Cast ==
- Matt Lucas as Pompidou P. Pompidou - Pompidou is the simple, dim-witted, penniless, but nice, lord of the manor. He is often attempting to overcome some kind of problem, or attempting something new. He frequently is a source of problems for his butler, and often is persistent in getting what he wants and keeping Hove loyal to him. While not speaking (he often mumbles or speaks in an unusual language of gibberish), he does have notable trademarks, including often greeting others with "Good afternoon", saying "No" when he's not satisfied with something, chastising another with "Naughty. Very naughty", (usually to Marion the dog), and acting childish and wailing when he is hurt, either by being slapped or by being trodden on, in which he breaks the fourth wall and says "That hurt me. That really hurt me".
- Alex Macqueen as Hove - Hove is Pompidou's stressed out, no-nonsense butler, and often has to deal with constant issues with his master. As such, he often bears the brunt of problems encountered, often getting the worst of it, but he grudgingly stays loyal to him even as he's frustrated by issues that he encounters, such as his master hoarding things.
- Marion - Pompidou's dog, an Afghan Hound who is often the sensible one of the three. Smart, very literate, and skilled, Marion is often told off for doing things any dog would attempt, while always having to endure the same issues as Pompidou and Hove.

Jane Asher starred in episode 3, Anita Dobson played the role of Sally in episode 4, and Beattie Edmondson appeared in episodes 1 and 6. Australian actress Rebel Wilson, Matt Lucas' roommate when both lived in the U.S., makes an uncredited cameo as a Vicki Pollard lookalike from Little Britain in episode 5. Julian Dutton, one of the show's co-writers, appeared as a cameo in episode 2 as the tea-drinking Cockney Delivery Man. Scottish comedian Limmy played a handyman in episode 6.

== Episodes ==
Episode	Original air date	Title	Viewers and % share
1	1 March 2015	"Hunger"	0.84m (4.2%)
2	8 March 2015	"Lottery"	0.62m (3.2%)
3	15 March 2015	"The Bowl"	0.67m (3.5%)
4	22 March 2015	"The Date"	0.53m (2.7%)
5	29 March 2015	"Hoarder"	0.5m (2.7%)
6	5 April 2015	"Cold"	0.5m (2.7%)

== Critical reception ==
The series was widely panned on release. Ben Dowell of the Radio Times labelled it "a strange beast", describing Lucas' character as "selfish, vain, venal and oddly childlike. I think he’d like me to add 'appealing' but I can't." (He did, however, point to a rare favourable review by one of his colleagues, Jack Seale.) Echoing remarks made by many other reviewers, Sally Newall of The Independent compared Lucas' shtick unfavourably to Rowan Atkinson's in Mr. Bean, as well as Lucas' own as the faux-disabled character Andy Pipkin in Little Britain.

Michael Hogan of The Telegraph called it "pretty painful: 25 minutes that felt like 75, with telegraphed jokes and interminable scenes. Justin “Mr Tumble” Fletcher does this sort of clowning better over on CBeebies." The idea that the series would be better served on a children's network was echoed by commenters on the trailer on YouTube. Negative audience reaction continued when the show came to Netflix as a "Netflix original", where it became the entertainment provider's lowest rated original series.

A retrospective on the series and its reception, by The Guardian's Brian Logan, spoke more positively, if not unreservedly, about Pompidou. Describing a supposed strain of snobbery in British criticism of silent comedy, and comedy that children can enjoy, Logan goes on to say that "some set-pieces don’t work ... And yes, some of it’s hokey and old-fashioned", but also speculates that any silent comedy vehicle may well have received "the sniffiness that’s greeted Pompidou".
