= The Matt Lucas Awards =

British BBC TV comedy panel show 2012–13

- Title card (2012–13)
- Genre: Entertainment; Comedy
- Created by: Matt Lucas; Ashley Blaker
- Developed by: Ashley Blaker; Bill Matthews
- Presented by: Matt Lucas
- Starring: Diana Lobatto; David Arnold (series 1)
- Country of origin: United Kingdom
- Original language: English
- No. of series: 2
- No. of episodes: 16 (list of episodes)

Production
- Executive producers: Mark Freeland; Matt Lucas
- Producers: Richard Grocock; Ashley Blaker
- Running time: 30 minutes
- Production company: John Stanley Productions

Original release
- Network: BBC One
- Release: 10 April 2012 – 17 December 2013

Related
- And the Winner Is

The Matt Lucas Awards is a British entertainment series hosted by comedian and television personality Matt Lucas.

== Background ==
The idea for The Matt Lucas Awards stemmed from And the Winner Is..., a radio series presented by Lucas for a number of years prior to the series. The format of the series involves a number of celebrity guests providing nominations for artists or objects in a number of weird and wonderful categories, the winner of which will receive a 'Lucas' award.

A pilot episode of the series was filmed in June 2011, and later released to the BBC iPlayer for internet viewing. The layout of the pilot consisted of Lucas in the centre of a studio of people, sitting on a couch, as if at an awards ceremony. Three guests would then come on, one at a time, and talk about one subject which they have a grievance with. The pilot received positive feedback from critics and audience alike, and as such, a full series of six episodes was commissioned by the BBC. Filming began in January 2012, with episodes airing from 10 April. Unlike the pilot, the series is set in a studio designed to look like Lucas' flat, and three guests each give a nomination in the same subject category, unlike the pilot, which was one subject per guest. Lucas' mother is also present in every episode. During the first series, musician David Arnold performed incidental music live in the studio. Each episode also features a performance section, where the guest must back up their nomination by giving a performance relating to it, such as singing, dancing or otherwise performing. Lucas performs the opening theme tune, and in the first series also sang variations on the theme live over the closing credits. Several changes took place for the second series, the most noticeable being that Lucas no longer decides the winner from each category himself, but instead the winner is chosen by a panel of judges. Also, Arnold does not appear and any incidental music is no longer performed live.

== Episode guide ==
=== Pilot ===
Show	Airdate	Guests
Pilot	16 June 2011	Dave Gorman; Ruby Wax; Jack Whitehall

=== Series 1 ===
Show	Airdate	Guests	Awards
1	10 April 2012	Jason Manford; Graeme Garden; Henning Wehn	• Smuggest Nation of People: The Chinese; • Most Artistic Guest: Graeme Garden; • Worst Football Song: Diamond Lights; • Most Efficient Guest: Henning Wehn
2	17 April 2012	Sue Perkins; Richard Madeley; Marc Wootton	• Ghastliest Holiday Destination: Isle of Skye; • Silliest Hair Ever Seen on a Guest's Head: Richard, Aged 47; • Utterly Useless Knowledge: Star Wars Figure Identification; • Most Peculiar Guest: Richard Madeley
3	24 April 2012	Louis Walsh; Germaine Greer; Clive Anderson	• Weirdest Celebrity Crush: Katie Price; • Dullest Pastime: Sudoku; • Most Regrettable Musical Genre: Madrigals; • Angriest Guest: Germaine Greer
4	1 May 2012	Esther Rantzen; Chris Tarrant; Johnny Vegas	• Baddest Habit: Texting and Talking; • Most Underwhelming Event: New Year's Eve; • Crappiest Beatles Song: I Am the Walrus; • Best Behaved Guest: Esther Rantzen
5	8 May 2012	Maureen Lipman; Julian Clary; Alex Horne	• Most Redundant Technology: Shoelaces; • Most Unbelievable Bible Story: Adam & Eve and the Snake; • Ultimately Pointless Skill: Motorway Service Station Identification; • Most Charming Guest: Maureen Lipman
6	15 May 2012	Griff Rhys Jones; Ruth Jones; David Baddiel	• Most Depressive School Subject: Maths; • Most More-Ish Food: Bacon, Pringles and Coconut Ice Cream; • Most Baffling Campfire Song: Puff, the Magic Dragon; • Most Passionate Guest: Griff Rhys Jones
7	22 May 2012	The Best, Worst, Awful, Awesome and Unseen Bits	

=== Series 2 ===
Show	Airdate	Guests	Judges	Awards
8	5 March 2013	Ardal O'Hanlon; Adil Ray; Robert Webb	Alex Danson; Anthony Ogogo; Kate Walsh	• Least Comprehensible UK Accent: Northern Irish; • Most Miserable Day of the Year: Valentine's Day; • Hidden Talent Award: Robert Webb (throwing mini basketballs backwards into a basket); • Grumpiest Guest: Ardal O'Hanlon and Adil Ray
9	12 March 2013	Eamonn Holmes; Josie Long; Jason Manford	Michael Cronin; Lee MacDonald; Gwyneth Powell	• Most Annoying Queue: Queuing at airports; • Most Irritating Children's TV Character: Andy Pandy; • Hidden Talent Award: Jason Manford (singing Italian opera); • Most Desperate Guest: Josie Long
10	19 March 2013	Gyles Brandreth; Holly Walsh; Mark Watson	Peter Duncan; Janet Ellis; Peter Purves	• Most Meaningless Phrase: Lightning does not strike twice in the same place; • Most Ridiculous British Law: It is illegal to jump, but not fly off Worthing Pier; • Hidden Talent Award: Mark Watson (ability to identify the number of letters in a word); • Most Chirpiest Guest: Gyles Brandreth
11	26 March 2013	Richard Bacon; Jason Byrne; Shappi Khorsandi	Stuart Baggs; Raef Bjayou; Katie Hopkins	• People You'd Kill If Murder Was Legal: The person who invented the hen night; • Second Greatest Bald Man of All Time: Donald Trump; • Hidden Talent Award: Jason Byrne (Irish dancing); • Best Behaved Guest: Shappi Khorsandi
12	9 April 2013	Susan Calman; Andy Parsons; Rhys Thomas	Sooty; Sweep; Soo	• Most Deluded group of people: Parents; • Most Fanciable Person of the Same Gender (Unless you are a gay in which case opposite gender): Daniel Craig; • Hidden Talent Award: Rhys Thomas (Knowledge of Queen Songs); • Most Childish Guest: Susan Calman
13	16 April 2013	Dave Gorman; Ruby Wax; Alex Horne	Leonard Fenton; John Altman; Peter Dean; Nej Adamson	• American most likely to make us glad we lost the USA to begin with: Kevin Trudeau; • Most miserable showbiz experience: Being heckled at the Hippo Club, Nottingham; • Hidden Talent Award: Ruby Wax (Zumba); • Bravest Guest: Alex Horne
14	2 June 2013	Series 2 Compilation		

=== Christmas Special ===
Show	Airdate	Guests	Judges	Awards
15	17 December 2013	Jo Brand; Alan Davies; Rhod Gilbert	Bob Carolgees; Bonnie Langford; Ted Robbins	• People you'd most like to leave off the Christmas card list: People who draw their eyebrows; • Most Effective Post-Christmas Diet: Carb-free diet; • Most Disappointing Christmas Present Ever Received: A bat box; • Hidden Talent Award: Jo Brand (An encyclopaedic knowledge of Elvis Costello songs); • Most Festive Guest: Rhod Gilbert
