= I've Never Seen Star Wars (radio series) =

- Genre: Comedy talk show
- Running time: 30 minutes
- Country of origin: United Kingdom
- Language: English
- Home station: BBC Radio 4, BBC Radio 4 Extra
- TV adaptations: I've Never Seen Star Wars
- Starring: Marcus Brigstocke
- Created by: Bill Dare
- Produced by: Bill Dare
- Original release: 18 September 2008 – 3 February 2015
- No. of series: 6
- No. of episodes: 36
- Opening theme: "Enjoy Yourself (It's Later than You Think)" by The Specials
- Website: Official website

I've Never Seen Star Wars is a comedy talk show broadcast on BBC Radio 4. Hosted by comedian Marcus Brigstocke, each episode features a celebrity guest trying out experiences that are new to them, but common to many others. The title comes from the show's producer and creator, Bill Dare, having never seen the Star Wars films. The series has been the subject of controversy due to the questionable taste of some of the experiences.

The show has been adapted for television and was first broadcast on BBC Four in early 2009.

== Format ==
Each episode features a guest presenting a list of things to Brigstocke that, until coming on the show, they had never done before but many others have. Generally the show is structured around one each of certain types of experiences; reading a new book, listening to some new music, watching a new film or television programme (for all of these, the guest is often given an example of a genre they've never sampled before), eating a new food and taking part in a new leisure activity. Examples of the latter include comedian Phill Jupitus having his first colonic irrigation, magician Paul Daniels learning how to swim and Goodies star Tim Brooke-Taylor buying his first pornographic magazine.

== Reception ==
The series has a mixed reception. Critics have praised the format. Chris Campling said I've Never Seen Star Wars is, "one of the most invigorating new comedy series of the 21st century."

Elisabeth Mahoney in The Guardian wrote about Jupitus' appearance saying: "He also tried colonic irrigation, and the recording of that was one of the funniest bits of radio this year. The therapist explained the process in a deadpan manner that was quite majestic, especially when she let her "tubing clamps" make their worrying sound effect. Jupitus fretted that she'd find "some hidden G-spot of delight" and that he'd become "sexually addicted to having my arse pumped out". Rather worryingly, then, he has already booked his next appointment."

However, the series has been attacked because of some of the experiences which have appeared. Jupitus' colonic irrigation and eating foie gras, and Brooke-Taylor buying pornography are amongst the moments which have been cause for complaint. Dare appeared on BBC Radio 4's listener complaints show Feedback to defend I've Never Seen Star Wars. Dare stated the choices were all made by the guests and were not designed to offend listeners. During the interview with host Roger Bolton, Dare was asked, "if he could reassure listeners that there'd be no heavy breathing in future." Dare mocked both Feedback and Bolton saying: "Only if we get an asthmatic on, I suppose. But now asthmatics are going to ring up and say, how dare you make fun of our condition?"

== Transmissions ==
Series	Episodes	Originally released	
Series	Episodes	First released	Last released
1	6	18 September 2008	23 October 2008
2	6	4 February 2009	11 March 2009
3	6	9 March 2010	3 March 2011
4	6	5 September 2011	10 October 2011
5	6	1 January 2013	5 February 2013
6	6	30 December 2014	3 February 2015

== Episodes ==
Six series of I've Never Seen Star Wars have been broadcast.

=== Series 1 (2008) ===
No. overall	No. in series	Guest	Original release date
1	1	Phill Jupitus	18 September 2008
Comedian Phill Jupitus tries eating foie gras with a Findus Crispy Pancake, has colonic irrigation, attempts to be a hairdresser, reads Jane Austen and drinks absinthe.
2	2	Paul Daniels	25 September 2008
Magician Paul Daniels cooks a meal, learns how to swim, experiences the film The Great Escape and reads some feminist literature.
3	3	Mark Steel	2 October 2008
Comedian Mark Steel takes tea at the Ritz Hotel, attempts to assemble a flat-pack stool, goes to watch Hamlet and has a shave at a barbershop.
4	4	Eve Pollard	9 October 2008
Journalist Eve Pollard watches The Rumble in the Jungle, learns how to play poker, reads Do Androids Dream of Electric Sheep? and drinks a cocktail.
5	5	Tim Brooke-Taylor	16 October 2008
Comedian Tim Brooke-Taylor makes a phone call, tries some unusual seafood, listens to a hip hop record and buys a pornographic magazine.
6	6	Esther Rantzen	23 October 2008
Broadcaster Esther Rantzen joins Facebook, attempts to iron a man's shirt, listens to The Dark Side of the Moon, tries reflexology and reads Scoop.

=== Series 2 (2009) ===
No. overall	No. in series	Guest	Original release date
7	1	Barry Cryer	4 February 2009
Comedian Barry Cryer watches Friends, eats vegetarian and vegan food, reads The Catcher in the Rye, listens to Back in Black, attempts to change a baby's nappy and sings karaoke.
8	2	Arthur Smith	11 February 2009
Comedian Arthur Smith watches Top Gear, learns how to play the piano, reads a Mills and Boon book, eats a Pop-Tart and watches Les Misérables.
9	3	Dame Joan Bakewell	18 February 2009
Journalist Joan Bakewell places her first horse racing bet, listens to Arctic Monkeys, reads The Rules, watches Mamma Mia! and has a beat boxing lesson.
10	4	Jan Ravens	25 February 2009
Impressionist Jan Ravens learns to box, reads Bravo Two Zero, builds a brick wall and has her eyebrows threaded.
11	5	Suggs	4 March 2009
Singer Suggs changes the oil in a car, listens to Take That and Vivaldi, reads A Brief History of Time, watches Titanic and learns to tap dance.
12	6	Sandi Toksvig	11 March 2009
Comedian Sandi Toksvig wears high heels, eats a Pot Noodle, watches a football match, listens to Purple Rain and walks on stilts.

=== Series 3 (2010–11) ===
No. overall	No. in series	Guest	Original release date
13	1	Sanjeev Bhaskar	9 March 2010
Comedian Sanjeev Bhaskar views the Crown Jewels, watches Sex and the City, plays Subbuteo, reads P. G. Wodehouse and goes to a Pentecostal service.
14	2	Jon Culshaw	16 March 2010
Impressionist Jon Culshaw has a salad, goes to a casino, watches Turandot, listens to Woman's Hour and watches The Bridge on the River Kwai.
15	3	Jenny Eclair	23 March 2010
Comedian Jenny Eclair reads Feel the Fear and Do It Anyway, eats eels, listens to Charlie Parker, has a bikini wax and watches Apocalypse Now.
16	4	Ardal O'Hanlon	30 March 2010
Comedian Ardal O'Hanlon takes some herbal remedies, attempts bell ringing, reads Sir Terry Pratchett, joins Twitter and tries Spinning.
17	5	John Lloyd	6 April 2010
Writer John Lloyd attempts to milk a goat, does some stand-up comedy, watches The Wire and revisits his old school.
18	6	Kate Adie	3 March 2011
Reporter Kate Adie has porridge, watches The Sopranos, goes to a bingo hall, reads Swallows and Amazons and tries Yoga.

=== Series 4 (2011) ===
No. overall	No. in series	Guest	Original release date
19	1	Ian Hislop	5 September 2011
Satirist Ian Hislop buys a pair of jeans, plays Grand Theft Auto, tries Buddhist meditation and bakes a cake.
20	2	Frank Skinner	12 September 2011
Comedian Frank Skinner has a spray tan, eats Jugged Hare, watches Inspector Morse and changes a car tyre.
21	3	Alan Davies	19 September 2011
Comedian Alan Davies has a pedicure, sings in public, reads The Adventures of Huckleberry Finn and watches The Jeremy Kyle Show.
22	4	Giles Coren	26 September 2011
Writer Giles Coren goes vegan, dances in public, reads some Harry Potter and listens to the charts as an adult.
23	5	Kathy Burke	3 October 2011
Actress Kathy Burke tries seafood, does life drawing, proves the first guest to match the programme's title and visits Harrods.
24	6	Sarah Millican	10 October 2011
Comedian Sarah Millican eats with chopsticks, reads The Joy of Sex, visits the Natural History Museum, watches the 1959 film Some Like It Hot and punches Marcus Brigstocke.

=== Series 5 (2013) ===
No. overall	No. in series	Guest	Original release date
25	1	Meera Syal	1 January 2013
Actor/writer Meera Syal eats snails, reads the Bhagavad Gita, watches Last Tango in Paris and attends a football match.
26	2	Dave Gorman	8 January 2013
Comedian Dave Gorman enjoys a "water cooler moment", rides a horse, reads A Tale of Two Cities and visits a strip club.
27	3	Benjamin Zephaniah	15 January 2013
Writer Benjamin Zephaniah drinks coffee and tea, reads The House at Pooh Corner, plays with a Scalextric and listens to Take Me Home.
28	4	Les Dennis	22 January 2013
Les Dennis eats cheese, listens to a Rolling Stones album, reads The Lion, the Witch and the Wardrobe and watches The Inbetweeners.
29	5	Jenni Murray	29 January 2013
Jenni Murray has a lesson in dog training, watches Reservoir Dogs, cooks a healthy meal of tofu, lentils and brown rice and watches a Frankie Boyle DVD.
30	6	Evelyn Glennie	5 February 2013
Percussionist Evelyn Glennie watches herself performing in the Olympic opening ceremony, drives a Go-Kart, watches Downton Abbey and throws a pot.

=== Series 6 (2014–15) ===
No. overall	No. in series	Guest	Original release date
31	1	Ann Widdecombe	30 December 2014
Politician Ann Widdecombe tries camping, watches the political drama The Thick of It, has a lesson in magic and tries a Jägerbomb.
32	2	Roy Walker	6 January 2015
Comedian Roy Walker tries bantering with the audience, watches his first Shakespeare play and has his first acting lesson.
33	3	Rebecca Front	13 January 2015
Comedy actress Rebecca Front rides a motorbike, reads her first book about science, attends her first cricket match and watches Mrs. Brown's Boys.
34	4	Gyles Brandreth	20 January 2015
Gyles Brandreth spends a day doing nothing at all, watches Breaking Bad and writes a pop song (performed by Jess Robinson as Miley Cyrus).
35	5	Reece Shearsmith	27 January 2015
Actor Reece Shearsmith eats frogs legs, has a driving lesson and tries wallpapering.
36	6	Dame Kelly Holmes	3 February 2015
Athlete Dame Kelly Holmes makes a chocolate fondue, eats a deep-fried Mars bar and a chocolate-covered scorpion, attends hypnotherapy for a fear of drowning and tries reflexology.
