= The Secret World (radio series) =

- Genre: Comedy radio
- Running time: 30 minutes
- Home station: BBC Radio 4
- Starring: Jon Culshaw; Lewis Macleod; Duncan Wisbey; Margaret Cabourn-Smith; Julian Dutton; Sarah Hadland (Series 1); Jess Robinson (Series 1 & 2); Debra Stephenson (Series 3 & 4); Peter Sallis; Duncan Wisbey (Series 4)
- Created by: Bill Dare
- Written by: Bill Dare; Julian Dutton; Duncan Wisbey (Series 1 & 3–4); Tom Jamieson (Series 1); Nev Fountain (Series 1); Joel Morrison (Series 1); Jason Hazeley (Series 1); Renton Skinner (Series 1); Rufus Jones (Series 1); Stephen Carlin (Series 1); James Sherwood (Series 1); Will Smith (Series 1)
- Produced by: Bill Dare
- Original release: 21 April 2009 – 2 January 2014
- No. of series: 4
- No. of episodes: 21
- Website: www.bbc.co.uk/programmes/b00svnmg

The Secret World is a comedy radio series using impressionists broadcast on BBC Radio 4. Using many of the creative team from the long-running series Dead Ringers, and originating as part of Radio 4's Happy Mondays pilot strand in 2008, the Secret World takes a subtler, more naturalistic approach, using famous figures in various bizarre yet humdrum situations, the comedy arising from the juxtapositions of contrasting characters and situations.

== Sketches ==
Sketches include:

- An ever-humble Jools Holland dealing with various situations, often with other-familiar fans. (Series 1)
- Alan Sugar as a therapist, with clients including Ringo Starr worrying that the Beatles may be over, and a post-PM Tony Blair concerned about his worth. (Series 1)
- Rolf Harris is revealed as Banksy. (Series 1)
- Gordon Brown – usually in the bath – consulting with Alistair Darling about how to appear humorous in public. (Series 1)
- Bill Gates trying to recruit a friend. (Series 1)
- John Humphrys dealing with a new Health and Safety culture at the BBC. (Series 1)
- Peter Mandelson attempting to demonstrate his delusionally imagined superhuman skills. (Series 1)
- The Arctic Monkeys obsessed with Woman's Hour. (Series 1)
- Morrissey arguing with various people about petty linguistic errors. (Series 1)
- William Hague's domestic concerns. (Series 1)
- Richard Dawkins trying to launch a singing career. (Series 1–2)
- Boy George and Abu Hamza al-Masri bonding while sharing a jail cell. (Series 1–2)
- Ray Winstone, Bob Hoskins and Ross Kemp in various scrapes – including getting trapped in a duvet, and being besieged by a ladybird. (Series 1–2)
- Al Pacino relentlessly regaling John Humphrys with conspiracy theories. (Series 2)
- David Beckham tries to commission a rainbow from James Cameron and a real dinosaur from Steven Spielberg for his children's party. (Series 2)
- David Attenborough in meetings with young BBC executives who wish to dumb-down and sex-up his documentaries. (Series 2)
- Alan Bennett responding to spam emails in his characteristic style. (Series 2–3)
- The Archbishop of Canterbury comes to terms with social media. (Series 3)
- Brian Cox is stalked by various female Radio 4 presenters. (Series 3)
- Danny Boyle applies his grand theatrical ambitions to a village pantomime. (Series 3)
- Peter Sallis invents a new type of fuel, only to be foiled by a conspiracy. (Series 3)

The sketches and characters often overlap to create an interwoven narrative during the episode.

The series won the Gold award for Best Comedy at the 2014 Radio Academy Awards. The organisers explained: "The judges felt that the greatest joy of The Secret World was in the sharpness of the writing and the highly entertaining performances. This wasn't just satire. It was satire with great imagination. Eavesdropping on the imagined lives of the famous, set in fanciful situations, provided the perfect vehicle for the team's excellent impressionist skills which stayed in the judges' minds long after the programme was over."
