= Number 10 (drama series) =

British radio drama series

- Genre: Drama
- Running time: 45 minutes
- Country of origin: United Kingdom
- Language: English
- Home station: BBC Radio 4
- Original release: 7 September 2007
- No. of series: 5

Number 10 is a drama series for BBC Radio 4 about a fictional British Prime Minister and his staff. The series was created by Jonathan Myerson, and produced by Clive Brill of Pacificus Productions, with Peter Hyman as Political Advisor. It has had five series to date, in 2007, 2008, 2009, 2010, and 2012. The first three series starred Antony Sher as Adam Armstrong, the Labour Prime Minister. The fourth series replaced him with Damian Lewis as a Tory prime minister in a minority government, in response to the United Kingdom coalition government which took office in 2010.

== Reception ==
The Independent wrote "Myerson's radio play was Shakespearean in its intrigue, its moments of tragedy and comedy and in its multi-layered action....Sixty action-packed minutes led to a gripping denouement. Number 10 possesses the fast pace that is found in the best of TV drama, which radio has been crying out for. Bring on the next four plays."

== Cast ==
=== Regular ===
==== Series 1 to 3 ====
- Adam Armstrong – Sir Antony Sher
- Monica Smith – Sasha Behar
- Polly Cairns – Haydn Gwynne
- Colin Brenner – Colin McFarlane
- Steve McKie – Stephen Mangan (Series 1 and 3)
- Steve McKie – Julian Rhind-Tutt (Series 2)

==== Series 4 & 5 ====
- Simon Laity ..... Damian Lewis
- Constance "Connie" Merchant ..... Haydn Gwynne (Series 4)
- Constance "Connie" Merchant ..... Stella Gonet (Series 5)
- Nathan Toltzn ..... Mike Sengelow
- Sir Hugo Bathgate ..... Julian Glover
- Amjad Hemmati ..... Arsher Ali
- Alan ..... John Hollingworth
- Georgina "Georgie" Cullinan ..... Gina McKee

=== Guest cast ===
==== Series 1 ====
===== Episode 1 =====
  - Frank ...... Anthony O'Donnell
  - Lord Cairns ...... James Laurenson
  - Nigel Ogden ...... Christopher Ettridge
  - Rebecca ...... Flora Montgomery
  - Conrad ...... Nick Rowe
  - Ms Austen ...... Claire Perkins
  - Journalist and News reader ...... Alice Arnold

===== Episode 2 =====
  - Kevin Munro ...... Clive Russell
  - Angela Brenner ...... Emma Fielding
  - Hannah Armstrong ...... Kelly Hunter
  - Scottish MP ...... Nick Rowe
  - Lewis Smiley MP ...... Dominic Rowan
  - President Sawadogo ...... Joseph Marcell
  - Ollie Armstrong ...... Joseph Kloska
  - Television News Reporter ...... Alice Arnold

===== Episode 3 =====
  - Lord Cairns ...... James Laurenson
  - Jasmine ...... Elizabeth McGovern
  - Hannah ...... Kelly Hunter
  - Norman Johnson ...... Shaun Prendergast
  - George ...... Nicholas Grace
  - Giles ...... Nicholas Woodeson
  - Anita ...... Carol McReady
  - Chrissie ...... Marcella Riordan

===== Episode 5 =====
  - Hannah ...... Kelly Hunter
  - Major ...... Sean Baker
  - General ...... Nicholas Woodeson
  - Justin ...... Jamie Glover
  - Billington ...... Anthony O'Donnell
  - Flannery ...... Susan Brown
  - Chrissie ...... Marcella Riordan
  - Conrad ...... Nicholas Rowe
  - Journalist ...... Alice Arnold

== Episodes ==
=== Series 1 ===
This series was first broadcast weekly at 9pm from 7 September to 5 October 2007. Episodes 1, 2 and 5 were written by Jonathan Myerson, episode 3 by Nicholas McInerny and episode 4 by Mike Harris. The series was produced and directed by Clive Brill.

1. Good News Day – As the Prime Minister prepares to announce an amnesty for all immigrants working illegally in the UK, a serious tube crash threatens to jeopardise his plans.
2. And Raise Them to Eternal Life – The party promised to eliminate Britain's carbon footprint, but poll ratings are plummeting and the unions are cutting up rough.
3. Who Won the Election? – As the government prepares for a major cancer screening initiative with a private American company, a leaked letter to the PM appears to advocate legalising cannabis.
4. Rule of Law – Launching a new organisation intended to integrate Muslims into British society and prevent radicalisation, the PM also has to decide whether to back Turkey's application for EU membership.
5. Home and Away – Crises loom on two fronts as the Prime Minister faces a backbench rebellion while British troops are being held hostage overseas.
