= Brian Gulliver's Travels =

- Genre: Satire/Sitcom
- Running time: 30 minutes
- Country of origin: United Kingdom
- Language: English
- Home station: BBC Radio 4 (Series 1); BBC Radio 4 Extra (Series 2)
- Starring: Neil Pearson; Mariah Gale; Paul Bhattacharjee
- Created by: Bill Dare
- Written by: Bill Dare and Dan Tetsell (Series 2: Ep 3)
- Produced by: Steven Canny
- Original release: 21 February 2011 – 30 July 2012
- No. of series: 2
- No. of episodes: 12
- Website: At BBC Radio 4

Brian Gulliver's Travels is a satirical comedy series and also a novel created and written by Bill Dare, first broadcast on 21 February 2011 on BBC Radio 4. A second series first broadcast on 25 June 2012 on BBC Radio 4 Extra. The series is a modern pastiche of the Jonathan Swift novel Gulliver's Travels.

== Plot ==
The series revolves around the character Brian Gulliver, played by Neil Pearson. Gulliver is a travel documentary presenter who at the beginning of series is revealed to have been missing for six years, claiming to have travelled to the previously undiscovered continent of Clafrenia. His stories lead him to being put in psychiatric hospital where they believe that he is suffering some sort of delusion. In each episode he is visited by his daughter Rachel (Mariah Gale), who writes about the countries that he claims to have visited.

== Production ==
Brian Gulliver's Travels is created and written by Bill Dare. According to the BBC website: "For years Bill Dare wanted to create a satire about different worlds exploring [Rudyard] Kipling's idea that we travel, 'not just to explore civilizations, but to better understand our own'. But science fiction and space ships never interested him, so he put the idea on ice. Then Brian Gulliver arrived and meant that our hero could be lost in a fictional world without the need for any sci-fi."

The BBC website also says that the original Gulliver's Travels was the only book that Dare read whilst he was at university.

== The Book ==
The novel, inspired by some stories in the radio series, is published by Pilrig Press, 4 July 2013.

It begins:

"At half past ten, nine days after my 21st birthday, I made my way to a psychiatric hospital in Highgate, North London, to meet my father, who had been missing for six years. In the two weeks since his reappearance, he had sent numerous emails in which he described “extraordinary worlds, and curious beings".

== Reception ==
Of the novel, Ian Hislop wrote: "A modern tale that keeps the flavour of the original classic, cleverly managing to provoke both laughter - and thought".

Gillian Reynolds, radio critic for The Daily Telegraph, praised Brian Gulliver's Travels saying that Gulliver was a "marvellous character" and that the series was "allusive, relevant, full of surprises, satirical in the true spirit of Swift. And very funny." Talking about the first episode, which was a satire on health and doctors, she said: "A nimbler reflection on achieving a national state of health is hard to imagine."

A review of the first episode in The Stage said that, "the point of Bill Dare's highly original format was to both satirise and issue a warning about the nanny state" and that, "The series began on an amusing and thought-provoking note."

== Merchandise ==
The first episode of Brian Gulliver's Travels was made available on the BBC's "Comedy of the Week" podcast on 28 February 2011. Likewise, the first episode of the second series was also released in the "Comedy of the Week" podcast (9 August 2012). The entire first series was released by AudioGo on 8 August 2011.

The novel is available at many retail outlets and online stores including Amazon, Waterstones, and Pilrig Press.

== Episodes ==
=== Series 1 (2011) ===
No. overall	No. in series	Title	Original release date
1	1	"Gelbetia"	21 February 2011
Brian talks about his adventures in Gelbetia, a country run by the medical profession.
2	2	"Juradia"	28 February 2011
Brian tells Rachel about his travels in Juradia, a country where every other person is a lawyer.
3	3	"Osminia"	7 March 2011
Brian talks about the country of Osminia, a land which has a different understanding of the family.
4	4	"Sham"	14 March 2011
Brian discusses his travels in Sham, a place which believes strongly in alternative therapies.
5	5	"Erosia"	21 March 2011
Brian talks about the country of Erosia, a country which has unusual sexual politics.
6	6	"Jampoa"	28 March 2011
Brian talks about his time in Jampoa, a country which is obsessed with fame.

=== Series 2 (2012) ===
No. overall	No. in series	Title	Original release date
7	1	"Chamanoa"	25 June 2012
Brian talks about his adventures in Chamanoa, an island where naturists who support genetic engineering and have designer babies battle nurturists who believe in educating their children.
8	2	"Lessington"	2 July 2012
Brian tells Rachel about Lessington, a country where ignorance reigns.
9	3	"Gravinia and Plumpf"	9 July 2012
Brian describes the land of Gravinia, where the military is revered, and has been at war with the pacifist country of Plumpf.
10	4	"Anidara"	16 July 2012
Brian recalls his travels in Anidara, a country where humans are farmed for their meat and experimented upon by strange animals.
11	5	"Hermicia"	23 July 2012
Brian talks about the country of Hermicia, which consists of the altruistic Manchevan people and the selfish Cononans.
12	6	"Kognitia"	30 July 2012
Brian looks back at his adventures in Kognitia, where people like to easily forget anything bad and people who cannot forget at will are considered "impaired".

== See also ==
- Gulliver's Travels
- Vent, also featuring Neil Pearson
