= Stephen Critchlow =

British actor (1966–2021)

- Born: Stephen Anthony Critchlow; 22 November 1966; Mansfield, Nottinghamshire, England
- Died: 19 September 2021 (aged 54)
- Occupation: Actor
- Years active: 1994–2021

Stephen Anthony Critchlow (22 November 1966 – 19 September 2021) was a British actor, known for his work in the theatre and appearances on radio series such as Truly, Madly, Bletchley, The Way We Live Right Now, and Spats, along with radio episodes of Torchwood (Lost Souls), and Doctor Who (The Nowhere Place). He has also appeared in Kenneth Williams: Fantabulosa! as Kenneth Horne, in Red Dwarf XI as computer-generated space ship captain Edwin Herring, Hattie as the Carry On film director Gerald Thomas and appeared in the West End version of The 39 Steps.

After recovering from a stroke in January 2020, Critchlow was diagnosed with cancer in January 2021 and was receiving medical treatment at Guy's Hospital in London. He continued working in audio productions in 2021 and died in September 2021, at the age of 54.

== Early life and education ==
Stephen Critchlow was born in Mansfield, Nottinghamshire in the United Kingdom. He trained as an actor at Mountview Drama School in London and completed his studies in 1990.

== Career ==
=== Theatre ===
Known in the theatre world as "Critch" or "The Critch", he worked in theatre all over Britain. Beginning in repertory, he performed in A Christmas Carol, When We Are Married and The Relapse (Birmingham Rep) and Sir Toby Belch in Twelfth Night (Theatre Royal, Northampton). His West End work included Hamlet, with Paul Darrow, directed by Sir Peter Hall CBE (Gielgud Theatre); Pygmalion, directed by Ray Cooney (Albery Theatre). He also played in Cyrano De Bergerac at Royal National Theatre directed by Howard Davis.

In 2004–05, he starred as Kenneth Horne in three national tours of Round the Horne... Revisited. He listed this as his favourite theatre job.

He returned to West End theatre to appear as one of four actors in The 39 Steps, a stage production of the film directed by Alfred Hitchcock, based on the novel by John Buchan and adapted by Patrick Barlow at the Criterion Theatre on Piccadilly Circus. The play involves the four actors playing all the 150 characters in the Hitchcock film which involves lightning quick costume and character changes.

=== Television ===
He has performed in many British television programmes and commercials. These include: Red Dwarf, Little Lord Fauntleroy, The Prince and the Pauper, Cider With Rosie, Peak Practice, Heartbeat as Leonard Parks and Adrian Pym, Monarch of the Glen, Trial & Retribution 1, 2 and 3, The Vice, The Bill, Blue Murder, The Armando Iannucci Show, The Thieving Headmistress, The Antique Rogues Show, Skins and The Cut.

He reprised his role as Kenneth Horne in Kenneth Williams: Fantabulosa! – a BBC film drama about the life and death of the British comedy performer Kenneth Williams. He played Carry On director Gerald Thomas in the 2011 biopic Hattie.

He was also involved in a South Korean cartoon series that was broadcast on CBBC in 2009 called Rocket Boy and Toro. He was the voice of Rocket Boy's nemesis, Dr. Square.

He became a familiar face on television screens in a series of commercials for the furniture company Oak Furniture Land, where he played a chief salesman called Oak who appeared in a number of comedy sketches to advertise the company.

=== Voice acting ===
Critchlow was a voice actor for video games like Operation Flashpoint: Resistance, Xenoblade Chronicles 2, Killzone 3, and Final Fantasy XIV: Heavensward. On radio, he performed in over 200 BBC radio drama productions during three spells with the BBC Radio Drama Company. He worked in all areas of the medium – Book at Bedtime, readings, light entertainment, schools radio, Woman's Hour, classic serials, radio plays, science fiction and Shakespeare. He played everything from Siamese fishermen to Macushi Indians. Notable performances were in radio episodes of Torchwood (Lost Souls) and Doctor Who (The Nowhere Place), Truly, Madly, Bletchley, The Way We Live Right Now, My Turn to Make the Tea, Spats, Journey to the Center of the Earth and Revd. Keach in A Month in the Country. He played the part of Stephen Chalkman in the long running BBC Radio Drama The Archers.

=== Film ===
He appeared in Fogbound, The Calcium Kid, Churchill: The Hollywood Years, and A Way Through The Woods.

=== Video games ===
Critchlow had roles in several video games, including Xenoblade Chronicles 2, Dragon Quest Heroes, Killzone 3, and Final Fantasy 14's Heavensward expansion. After his death was announced, Final Fantasy XIV players paid tribute to him in online vigils outside Fortemps Manor, where the character he voiced, Count Edmont de Fortemps, resided. His final role was for Byron Rosfield in Final Fantasy XVI.
