= Jonathan Myerson =

British writer

Lambeth Borough Councillor for Clapham Town Ward
- In office 2 May 2002 – 4 May 2006
- Preceded by: Michael English
- Succeeded by: Nigel Haselden

Personal details
- Born: 12 January 1960 (age 66) Cardiff, Wales
- Party: Labour
- Spouse: Julie Myerson

Jonathan Myerson (born 12 January 1960 in Cardiff, Wales) is a British dramatist and novelist, writing principally for television and radio. His partner is novelist Julie Myerson.

== Early life ==
Myerson's great-grandfather, Carnovsky, was an ex-Russian asylum seeker, who arrived, in 1883 and spoke only Yiddish. Myerson's grandfather's family arrived from Johannesburg in the mid-nineteen-twenties. Myerson's mother (née Lavis) arrived from Australia just after WW2. Myerson's father died in 1986. Jewish Genealogical Society of Great Britain deems him Jewish.

== Career ==
Myerson's first play Making a Difference was commissioned by the Oxford Playhouse Company. A subsequent work, Diary of a Nobody was written for the National Theatre.

His audio work for BBC Radio 4 includes Number 10, a five-part series about a fictional Prime Minister and his staff in Downing Street, including an episode in which Saint Helena is invaded by Angola; That was Then, which was broadcast in five parts as BBC Radio Four's 15 Minute Drama in 2017; The Republicans, a suite of six plays about recent US presidents in 2018; and Nuremberg: The Trial of the Nazi War Criminals, which was broadcast in 16 parts in 2021 The Way We Live Right Now, a BBC Radio Four adaptation in 15 episodes of twelve minutes of the Anthony Trollope novel The Way We Live Now, re-setting it in the present day. for the Woman's Hour.

His animated film of The Canterbury Tales was nominated for an Oscar (as animated short film) in 1999 and won the BAFTA Award for Best Animated Film in addition to four Primetime Emmys.

He has also written scripts for several British television drama series including The Bill, Holby City, EastEnders, Jupiter Moon and The Legend of William Tell as well as being involved in animation. He has written scripts for Testament: The Bible in Animation and The Canterbury Tales (as being head director and executive director) and voice directed Animated Tales of the World. In June 2017, Myerson's

Myerson is the author of two novels, Noise (1998) and Your Father (1999) and is a founding partner of The Writer's Practice, a literary consultancy.

He was a Labour councillor for Clapham Town Ward, Lambeth from 2002 to 2006

As of 2017, he is the Course Director, MA in Creative Writing (Novels) at City University London's Journalism Department.

== Personal life ==
He lives in South London with novelist Julie Myerson, and two of their three children, Chloe and Raphael. The family was secretly the subject of the "Living with Teenagers" column in The Guardian newspaper before later being identified. It was revealed in 2009 that their third child, Jake, had several years earlier (2007) been thrown out of the family home by the parents for smoking cannabis. Both he and his wife have been criticized for their lack of empathy and poor understanding of youth culture. In an article in The Guardian, Myerson reported that, upon hearing his son would achieve "A" grades at GCSE, he said: "He needs to fail one of these GCSEs. He needs to realise what he's doing."

== Radio scripts ==
- (2017) That Was Then Episodes 1 to 5 – BBC Radio 4 via: City University London
- (2016) The Clintons: a trilogy – BBC Radio 4 via: City University London
- (2016) The Price of Oil – BBC Radio 4 via: City University London
- (2016) Reykjavik – BBC Radio 4 via: City University London
- (2015) Born In The DDR - BBC Radio 4 via: City University London

- Born in the DDR – BBC Radio 4 via: City University London

- (2011) Payback: ten days in October 1973 – BBC Radio 4 via: City University London
- (2011) Life and Fate – BBC Radio 4 via: City University London
- (2009) Number 10 (Series 3) – BBC Radio 4 via: City University London
- (2009) Invasion – BBC Radio 4 via: City University London
- (2008) The way we live right now – BBC Radio 4 via: City University London

- the way we live right now (radio script, 15 episodes) – BBC Radio 4 via: City University London
