= The Way We Live Right Now =

British radio novel adaptation

- Genre: Radio drama
- Country of origin: United Kingdom
- Language(s): English
- Home station: BBC Radio Four
- Starring: Henry Goodman; Dexter Fletcher; John Rowe; Nyasha Hatendi; David Bamber; Lucy Montgomery; Sheridan Smith; Chipo Chung; Ben Crowe; Emily Wachter; Annette Badland; Liz Sutherland; Stephen Critchlow
- Written by: Anthony Trollope (original); Jonathan Myerson (adaptation)
- Website: www.bbc.co.uk/programmes/b00c3wxw

The Way We Live Right Now was a BBC Radio Four adaptation of the Anthony Trollope novel The Way We Live Now, re-setting it in the present day. It was written by Jonathan Myerson for the Woman's Hour serial and broadcast on BBC Radio 4 in 15 episodes of twelve minutes duration over three weeks in June 2008.

Myerson updated Trollope's 1875 novel to show that financial venality was just as prevalent in 2008. Myerson found the modern equivalent of aristocrats-for-sale in "celebs". Myerson found the modern equivalent of a bogus railroad scheme in a Big Pharma antibiotic alternative.

== Cast ==
- Henry Goodman - Ghassan Mehmoud
- Dexter Fletcher -‘Flex’ Carbury
- John Rowe - Anthony Trollope
- Nyasha Hatendi - Paul Montague
- David Bamber - Rt. Hon. Jeremy Longstaff
- Lucy Montgomery - Georgiana Longstaff
- Sheridan Smith - Ruby Ruggles
- Chipo Chung - Marie Mehmoud
- Ben Crowe - Roger Lloyd-Montague
- Emily Wachter - Hetta Carbury
- Annette Badland - Tilly Carbury
- Liz Sutherland - Helen Croll
- Stephen Critchlow - Nick Broune
