= Rocket Boy and Toro =

British-South Korean television series

- Hangul: 로켓보이
- RR: Roketboi
- MR: Rok'etpoi
- Genre: Animation
- Directed by: John Offord
- Starring: Lizzie Waterworth; Candida Gubbins; Stuart Milligan; Nick Haverson; Stephen Critchlow
- Opening theme: "Rocket Boy"
- Countries of origin: United Kingdom; South Korea
- Original languages: English; Korean
- No. of seasons: 1
- No. of episodes: 52

Production
- Executive producers: Tony Atkins; Mark Rowland; James J.H. Lee; Ki-Bae Lee; Chris Bowden
- Producer: Ji-Woong Park
- Running time: 11 minutes
- Production companies: Imagestone Inc. Cosgrove Hall Films; Village Productions

Original release
- Network: CBBC
- Release: 22 September 2008 – 7 January 2009

Rocket Boy and Toro (Korean: 로켓보이) is a British-South Korean animated cartoon series that originally aired on CBBC in 2008 to 2009. The show was set in space and the main characters consisted of Rocket Boy, Chrystella, Vector, Grandpa Sat, and Toro, Rocket Boy's sheep assistant. In the UK, the show only aired for two years and has not aired since. However, reruns continue to this day of the series, dubbed into Arabic, on Basma channel in the Arab world.

The show is mainly about Rocket Boy and his friends delivering parcels to different galaxies and planets around space. During the course of the series they are always slowed down by his Archenemy Dr. Square the Sworn Enemy of the Galactic Parliament (an evil super computer with the brain the size of a planet), and his henchman, Trash (who always tends to fail his missions). Dr. Square is always trying to capture Rocket Boy so he can learn the secret of his speed, but no matter how hard he tries, Rocket Boy and his friends always seem to come out on top.

The show was created by Korean animation studio Imagestone, Manchester-based Cosgrove Hall Films, and London-based Village Prods. Most of the show's character design was handled by German animator Andreas Hykade.

== Episodes ==
1. Rocket Boy Squared
2. The Mallatese Chicken
3. Inspector Calls
4. Big Job Day
5. Worms He Gone
6. One of Our Sheep is Missing
7. Chrystella Goes to The Shops
8. Bubblegum World
9. Close Encounters of a Bird Kind
10. Doctor Doctor
11. Steal Wool
12. Little Lord Sweetie
13. Tale of Two Rockets
14. Reverse Psychology
15. Taking Out The Trash
16. Junk Mail
17. Fools Gold
18. Baby Blues
19. Botosaur Bones
20. Treasure Planet
21. Squarapalooza
22. Toro Toro Toro
23. Team Spirit
24. Boots of Destiny
25. Kung Fun
26. Sheep Mates
27. Lights, Camera, Action!
28. Hero Worship
29. That Shrinking Feeling
30. Micro Computer
31. Son of Square
32. Return of The Rebel Appliance
33. Brainbots
34. Vector's Little Helper
35. Missing in Action
36. School Daze
37. Penny For Your Thoughts
38. Ghosts in The Machine
39. High Moon
40. Turbo Twins
41. Tunnel Vision
42. Storm Brewing
43. Breakdown
44. Surfing The Web
45. The Big Fall Out
46. All Done With Mirrors
47. Disguise
48. Rocket Girl
49. Celebrity
50. Rocket Boy to The Rescue
51. Big Buoy
52. The Pan Galactic Sheep Trials
