= The Harpoon =

BBC Radio 4 series

The Harpoon is a BBC Radio 4 series broadcast between 1991 and 1994, written by Julian Dutton and Peter Baynham. It consisted of three four-part series and two Christmas specials, and was performed by Julian Dutton, Peter Baynham, Susie Brann, Alistair McGowan and Mary Elliott-Nelson. It was produced ("on stretched goat's vellum") by Sarah Smith, the series was nominated for a British Comedy Award for Best Radio Comedy in 1992.

The programme was a spoof of boys' comics from the Empire days of the 20th century, "a magazine for young and old across the English-speaking world" featuring "Your old chum" the Editor (McGowan) presenting regular features, adventure stories, practical advice, readers letters, etc., complete with advertisements. An enthusiastic young reader (Baynham) could be heard turning (and once accidentally tearing) the pages and occasionally commenting. Much of the humour rested upon anachronistic, politically incorrect attitudes towards such topics as education, class, sex, race, war, and the avuncular, paternalistic style adopted by interwar boys' publications like the Boy's Own Paper in addressing their readers. The reference to whaling in the title was underscored by the illustrated front cover of the magazine, i.e. the opening music/sound effects of the programme.

Writing and performances on The Harpoon were of high quality, as was technical production, using 'authentic' voices, sound effects, and music to evoke the era and create the impression of a magazine being read. The series has been released on Audible (service). Episodes from all three series are regularly repeated on BBC Radio 4 Extra.

== Music ==
Among other pieces, some music found during the series:

- "Soldiers of the King" by Leslie Stuart (used as opening theme).
- "Who's Been Polishing the Sun" by Noel Gay, sung by Jack Hulbert (closing theme).
- "Yes, Yes, My Baby Said Yes, Yes" by Con Conrad and Cliff Friend sung by Eddie Cantor (incidental music).
- "Gaudeamus igitur", traditional (Maisie Drummond's school song).

== Signature Sound Effect ==
A harpoon being fired and apparently hitting some large beast which expires with a theatrical groan that was added in Episode 2.

== Recurring Features ==
As in a real magazine, certain features recur in many "issues" -

- Front Page - A picture of a whaling ship The Harpoon with "oilskinned sailors greasing their harpoons and dreaming of blubber".
- Title-Page - "..with 6 colour plates and numerous black-and-white illustrations..", "Price, sevenpence ha'penny net" (with higher prices for special editions), "..available throughout the Empire", "all rights reserved".
- Opening Page - introduced by "Your Chum, The Editor".
- A Serial Feature
  - Meadowfields Maisie - starring Maisie Drummond - school song "Gaudeamus igitur"
  - Harpoon Romance - The Brigands of Lanada - an adventure serial "in the land of the Dago"
  - Harpoon Mystery - The Case of The Haunted Moustache
- How To - written by the Rev. A. Morris, which has features like "How to build an uphill sledge" -> by attaching a rope to a sledge.
- Door To The Future - ridiculous predictions of what is to come based on a 1920s perspective.
- Wonders of Nature - illustrated lifecycles of fictional "creatures".
- Centre Pages - where the "cutout-and-keep" gift is located.
- True-Life Tales - tales of exploration and Empire:
  - A sequence journals of expeditions to find other explorers starting with Edmund Colt's (on the lines of Henry Morton Stanley's search for Dr Livingstone).
  - Ring of Fear - The life of Dimmy Dolt.
  - Collett, The Badger That Did Its Bit.
- Comic Corner - Read out cels of comics usually with a weak pun as the basis.
- Baffling but Bona-Fide - "fascinating facts at the foot of the page". These "facts" are either trivial observations or non-sequiturs.
- Boys/Families of Other Lands - xenophobic stereotypes of "Johnny Foreigner" including such peoples as the Italians "Girls, a touch too keen to get his grubby hands on the contents of your bodice" or the Welsh "Bore-da to you, Evanses". Illustrated by photographs.
- The Harpooners Club - read by The Editor:
  - Reader submitted "joke-ettes", prize a five shilling postal order
  - Answers to last week's puzzles (improbable answers to questions which are not given)
  - Picture crossword
  - Join the Dots
  - Word Teazer - make more thematic words from a simple set like using "A Pot" and suggest words related to rabbit-keeping
  - Spot the difference - two audio-illustrated "pictures" with very obvious differences
  - Answers to Readers Letters - again with questions not provided

Some were one-offs

- Achievements of the Empire - great moments of British history (in the style of Ladybird Books)
- Quiz - with a ridiculously insignificant prize
- Mystery Object - "a loom" - spotting which would give the first reader to do so a "pocket-knife with bulls-eye attachment"
- Whaling for the Under-Fives, with Captain Bobbit
- From A to Z, with Nurse Dennis - "an alphabet of universal knowledge". Introduced by examples like "from angina to Zulus, removal of"
- The Healthy Harpooner - talk of physical exertions
- Stamp Corner
- Bird Scarer
- Magic using a Goose as a Distraction
- Notable Fireplaces of England

== Characters ==
First season characters include -

- The Reader - a schoolboy type prone to exclamations like "Yaroo! Now for some Fun!"
- ""Postie" - who delivers the magazine to The Reader, whistling as he does so, apparently tracking him down even when he is on vacation far away from his home.
- The Editor ("Your Old Chum") - who presents both the "front-piece" - a read table of contents - and the Harpoon Club readers letters on the "rear-pages", with answers to (unstated) reader's questions, often for innuendo (as in Round the Horne) or as inside jokes "Well, Master A. Hitler, I'd give up the painting, if I were you, the samples showed little promise, why not try some other hobby, say, public speaking .. few guns might be handy". All in a jolly, paternalistic, bombastic and often misogynistic style with sound effects suggesting additional off-mic activities (frequently shooting as he is evidently gun-obsessed). His first name is revealed to be Fortinbras when he reads out a letter from a female reader accusing him of abandonment.
- Captain Bobbit - Master of the Harpoon. Author - Walrus-Clubbing for the Young at Heart
- Meadowfields characters
  - Maisie Drummond - Plucky 14-year-old working-class school-girl solving crimes at her posh boarding school "the most exclusive academy in England for young English-Women" - located in the village of Slumber-on-the-Chintz. Weekly cliff-hangers which were improbably resolved, e.g., "with the help of this gun I happen to have". She has a former milkman's horse called "Milko" who has only 3-legs and so is referred to as "Crooked Milko" with which she attempts to win the gymkhana using his "superior dressage skills". Using a blend of class styles, she writes letters home with Cockney rhyming-slang expressions but addresses the letter to "Mater and Pater". Presumably her surname refers to Bulldog Drummond. Her sleuthing is made easier by all villains she encounters having cloth caps, "distorted facial features", and all using binoculars.
  - Princess Tarin of Addabadaba - Maisie Drummond's best friend, with an Anglo-Indian accent. She keeps getting kidnapped. Her mount is called Murray Mint.
  - The Eight Mildreds - Maisie Drummond's school-chums, who all speak in chorus. They all ride ponies called Dobbin.
  - Bertha - Maisie and the Mildred's "rotund chum" who is "fat, wears glasses and likes jam tarts, but is a good egg really".
  - Miss Snape - Scottish Headmistress of MeadowFields. Turns out to be the leader of the white-slavers. Revealed to be Sheik Mustafa Snape leader of the white-slave gang.
  - Abdul "the Arab" Caretaker - member of the gang thwarted by Maisie.
  - Jenny Throgmorton Fanshaw - a kidnapped schoolgirl
- Hobby Horse - an equine presenter of the "cutout-and-keep" gift. The gift can turn out to be in several parts because it is a scale 1:1 "Oast House" that should not be assembled indoors.
- Miss Winifred Gibson - sports instructress for Margate Young Women's Correctional Facility. Demonstrations by members of the Carshalton Breast Strokers. A jolly-hockey-sticks type who seems to harbor erotic thoughts about her under-age charges.
- P.C. Poon - of the Harpoon District Constabulary.
- Brigands of Lanada characters
  - Toby Watkiss - junior law-clerk from Mottram St. Andrew, lead character in The Brigands of Lanada, actually a Group-Captain in British Intelligence.
  - Howard - Toby's young chum who is "unusually well-built". Castrated by "underpaid grape crushers". Westcountry accent. Has been in the second form for seventeen years.
  - General Patata - evil socialist warlord in Lanada. Seems unclear on how the "inter-regnum" after the ouster of the monarchy is actually being run.
  - Rioja, Gazpacho and Tortilla - The three sidekicks of General Patata. Gazpacho rides a donkey called Paella and sings to it as it dies (again and again).
  - Franela Lapida Naranja - translated as "Orange Tombstone Flannel", the princess of Lanada who marries Howard after he falls on and kills her mother and so makes her Queen.
- The Story of The Comb characters
  - Wilhelm Schluppenshaft - would-be comb inventor - experiments include "varm milch"
  - Griselda - "idiot maid" to Dr Schluppenshaft - who actually invented the comb but got no credit
- The Life of Dimmy "Dolt" characters
  - Dimmy Dolt "Clinch" - "The tallest midget in Christendom". An Irish 6 foot 4 inch circus performer whose act consists of drinking lemonade on a bed, he yearns to be free of this intolerable circus life.
  - Mr Timothy Smith - "evil" ringmaster who proposes trips to the seaside for Dimmy.
  - Eva La Blanc - trapeze artist and Dimmy's love interest
  - Figaro Ballcock - the knife admirer and rival for Eva's attentions
  - "Massive" Jack - "The 2 foot colossus of Gwent".
- The Case of The Haunted Moustache characters
  - Professor Cornucopia Blizzard - An archeologist who disturbed the tomb of Zargon The Great of Mesopotamia.
  - Constant Bickwell - friend of Professor Blizzard - a Dr Watson type.
  - Withers - Blizzard's butler
- Selsden Mace Expedition members
  - Raph Hick - medic - winner of the "seal-pup hurling competition".
  - Alistair Burkiss - team inventor.
  - Carlton Sluice - team dentist.
  - Jean-Paul Maison - team French sous-chef.
  - Emerson French - team household product salesman who did a Captain Oates but returned.
  - Constantine Connive - team mayor.

== Guest Authors ==
The Harpoon's contents were written by a wide-assortment of guest authors with satirical, posh-sounding names very much in the naming style of 'Beachcomber'. In the first series, these were introduced with the titles of prior publications they had written for additional comedic effect.

- Reverend A. Morris - HowTo features - Prior Works - How to Build a ..Wheelbarrow, ..Sledge, ..Chicken-Coop, ..WorkBench, ..Lectern, ..Goose-Restrictor, ..Wig. A Welsh preacher who provides little in the way of constructional detail beyond what can be discerned from the breaking up the title of the item. He relies on illustration "Plates" and "Figures" - which are rendered as sound-effects. He tends to end by waxing lyrical via an ode which the reader (wisely) turns the page away from in mid-stream.
- Della Vigilante Hill - Maisie Drummond - Prior Works - She skated 'til she dropped, The Ballet Shoe Was Missing, They Found the Ballet Shoe.
- Dr Mortimer Dim - Door to Technology/The Future - An Old Etonian accent rather like James Fox or Harry Enfield's character Mr Chumley-Warner. He has a 50% success ratio, for example in 1968 the motorways are "of solid oak construction". The cars are supersonic but have "silver-plated crank-handles".
- Miss Valerie Hastings - Wonders of Nature. A series of audio-rendered "Figures" illustrating stages in an improbable creatures life.
- Rachael Froth - Wonders of Nature. Lifecycle of the Dutch Clog.
- Sir Mirian D'eath - Arctic Explorer, diverted to Africa.
- Edmund Colt - Author - True-Life Tales. Prior Works - No More Exploring, Darjeeling with Black Dick. A journalling explorer in Waoon Province with his "talented but inexpensive" guide Wattombi. He journals florid passages on the beauty of nature - which he then shoots and eats. On encountering a "white native" who insists his name is "Reggie" - he shoots him on the grounds the "plus fours and pith helmet weren't fooling anybody". He is boiled by pygmy cannibals setting of the expedition of Selsden Mace.
- A. A. Spence - Illustrator of True-Life Tales. cf. A. A. Milne.
- Selsden Mace - Author - True-Life Tales - "In Search of Edmond Colt". Prior Works - We Rode before Supper, Only a Giraffe, Too Soon for Oysters, Laughter in The Gallery and Blood, Guts and Muffins. Goes to Antarctica rather than Africa and is lost, setting off the expedition of Carsholton Edgar.
- Carshalton Edgar - Author - True-Life Tales - "In Search of Selsden Mace". Prior Works - All for a Breast-Plate, Oh, Nepal, and I Paid Her Well, Guttersnipe Jim, Luncheon or Death, I Packed My Chiffon NeckTie. Locks himself in the house and starves to death even though he has a six-month supply of food strapped to the roof of his Bentley outside.
- P.C. Gwen Matlock - Author - In Search of Carshalton Edgar - Prior Work - Crimes in Hoxton and Surrounding Villages - An Annual report
- Nurse Dennis - Author - From A to Z. Laughing Through the Depression. A Scottish character with the catchphrase "Hello m'deerios" dispensing advice on mainly culinary matters while considering non-culinary items "no use whatsoever". Somewhat Fanny Craddock like.
- "Wee" Bobby - Nurse Dennis' dim assistant who reads out the titles in a halting manner.
- Edward Fondle - Author - Courting Tips
- Archie Burlap - Author - Leaf Collecting in The Lebanon
- Montgomery Withering - Author - My Fight with a Finch
- Thornton Labrador - Author - A Chat about Sap - Prior Work - Rubber - The Truth. Upper-class obsessive with a lisp. Journeys to Peru to find natives that worship sap.
- Bentley Warhol - Author - The Brigands of Lanada - Prior Work - The Cruel Lagoon, She Pushed Too Hard, Gyspy Begone, The Fiery Totem, He Courted a Slave, The Red Belgian, Saved by a Stilton, To Love a Costermonger.
- Henrietta Velveteen - How to Throw Your Voice - principal ventriloquist in the show Tickle My Fancy. Has an aspirated 'h' problem
- Carl Bravado - Illustrator - The Story of the Comb
- Lavina Lupus - Author - The Story of the Comb
- Lazlo Feta - Author - The Birth of the Balcony
- Miss Valerie Hastings - Illustrator - The Life-cycle of the Bull Elephant - 938 "figures" culminating in being shot.
- L. Minto - photographer, Milford Haven
- Dr. Edith Pariah - physician - What Every Wife Should Know - supposedly frank advice that "a young wife will have to perform for her husband on their honeymoon" - which involves machine-sewing.
- Grace Calvett - Author -The Joy of Wool - Suffers from a nasal obstruction, possibly brought on by a lack of "nose-cosy"
- Cecily Plinth - Illustrator - The History of the Tomato
- Barabus Flint - Author - Kiss of the Cowhand - Prior Work - The Golden Toga, Pascoe Jack, I Shaved a Shepherd
- Winifred Huddle - Author - Collet - The Badger That Did Its Bit - Prior Work - Penguins Progress, I Knew a Goat - A WWI tale of badger heroism and derring-do.

== Adverts ==
Scattered throughout the magazine, usually asking the reader to write in response.

- Cormorants Cigarettes - "Promote health, vigor and happiness". "Guaranteed high-tar for clear lungs and fresh breath".
- Brewer's Military Mustaches - "Boys; become men". send to - J. Dixon, The Slaughterhouse, Wimbledon.
- Housing Development - "..well-appointed, genteel, affording splendid vistas of adjacent deer-park". J. Brown, 93 Burma Crescent, Toxteth.
- Broken Window Simulator - Stonko Products - a sheet of plate glass that will shatter when dropped onto a hard surface. Stonko Products Ltd, formerly Braithwaites Glass Works, Yorkshire.
- Pork Purchase Reminder - a device to remind "the busy housewife" to buy pork.
- Salt - "A brand-new interest".
- Montmorency's Snuff - "nasal pleasure at its finest" sponsor of the Laughing Through the Depression Edition.
- Morrison's Invisible Mending Sewing Pack - so invisible it appears not to be effective. Chuck Morisson's Business Enterprises Ltd, Above the Chip-Shop, Worthing.
- Whitebounds Grey Paint - "its very grey" - over 40 shades - 11 Chitterly Road, Wallasey.
- ICI and Sons - they need a shopgirl or even two as they "intend to expand" - The Cornershop, Margate.
- Mickelwhite's Visual Radiograms - "see your radio programs" - "available in black-and-white only".
- The Frog Press - a machine for flattening dead frogs to put them into an album. Simpson Sledgehammers Ltd, 33 The Crescent, Blandford Forum.
- Microscopes - Bachelors Microscope Emporium, Cheam, PO Box 10.

== Editor Sign-off ==
"Imperatus Foundatiamus Blubberum"

== See also ==
- Bigipedia
- The Sunday Format
