= Vent (radio series) =

- Running time: 30 minutes
- Country of origin: United Kingdom
- Language: English
- Home station: BBC Radio 4
- Starring: Neil Pearson; Fiona Allen; Josie Lawrence; Leslie Ash
- Written by: Nigel Smith
- Directed by: Nigel Smith
- Produced by: Gareth Edwards
- Original release: 11 July 2006 – 29 December 2009
- No. of series: 3
- No. of episodes: 18 + 1 special

Vent is a dark comedy series produced for BBC Radio 4 in 2006. It is written by Nigel Smith. The producer is Gareth Edwards.

The story revolves around an unsuccessful writer named Ben Smith (Neil Pearson), who is in a coma. While his wife Mary (Fiona Allen) and his mother (Josie Lawrence) hash out their emotional issues at his bedside, he lives in a fantasy world with his 2-year-old daughter "Blitzkrieg" (real name Beatrice; Leslie Ash), miraculously grown up, and remembers incidents from his life. An imaginary sitcom, apparently written by Ben and concerning a coma ward in a hospital, plays in the background.

A second series of 6 episodes began broadcasting on BBC Radio 4 on 25 September 2007. A third series describing Ben's return home, still clinging to his fantasy life, began broadcasting on BBC Radio 4 on 24 November 2009.

While the flashbacks in the first series concern Ben and Mary's courtship, pursued somewhat reluctantly on Mary's part, the second series shows the slow process of recovery for Ben in parallel with their marriage, her pregnancy, and Ben's lapses of commitment. Ben's fantasy life revolves around him giving up total control of his fantasy world before returning to a real world where he has no control at all.

The third series was preceded by an interlude episode broadcast as the Friday Play on 20 November. In this episode Ben is out of his coma but is suffering from locked-in syndrome. He still experiences memories and fantasies while his wife and mother try to communicate with him. Meanwhile the hospital authorities are considering whether to continue with rehabilitation or ship him to a care home.

Writer Nigel Smith spent some time in a coma himself, later describing it in an article in The Times and in an autobiography published in 2007.

== Episodes ==
=== Series One ===
No. overall	No. in series	Title	Original release date
1	1	"Wake Me Up Before You Go-Go"	11 July 2006
While coma patient Ben's family keeps vigil at his bedside, his mind is able to communicate with other coma patients.
2	2	"Don't Bet on It"	18 July 2006
Ben's relatives resort to horse racing on the radio to get him to wake up, while in his mind Ben meets Elizabethan psychic Dr. John Dee.
3	3	"Wouldn't You Like to Get Away"	25 July 2006
Ben's unconscious body gets driven to a medical conference in Birmingham while his mind takes a trip back to where he had the most miserable night of his life.
4	4	"Switching Off"	1 August 2006
The new female hospital psychiatrist has a surprising effect on Ben, while his wife and mother are realizing how bored they are.
5	5	"Gravity Gets You Down"	8 August 2006
Ben punches his new physiotherapist in the real world and has a conversation with Elvis in his fantasy world.
6	6	"Switching Off"	15 August 2006
While Ben's mind takes him through the landscape of his own chaotic brain, which looks suspiciously like Mordor, the doctors switch off his ventilator.

=== Series Two ===
No. overall	No. in series	Title	Original release date
7	1	"Mary's Girl Child"	25 September 2007
Even in a comatose state there's Christmas, as the nativity plays out in Ben's unconscious mind.
8	2	"Things To Do Before You Die"	2 October 2007
Comatose Ben travels back to 1973 to find a 'life coach' to motivate him out of his coma.
9	3	"I Want You"	9 October 2007
Ben's unconscious mind puts him in a compromising situation with a fellow coma patient - and this time Ben's wife Mary, who's somehow entered his fantasy world, is taking part in the drama!
10	4	"Wednesday Morning 3am"	16 October 2007
Ben shares his thoughts with those awake at the darkest hour of the night while his wife Mary, who's at a conference in Brussels, is sorely tempted.
11	5	"Alternatives"	23 October 2007
What would comatose Ben's life be like if it was a Hollywood movie? It couldn't be worse than his alternative therapist in the real world...or can it?
12	6	"Arrival"	30 October 2007
Ben gets the feeling things are about to change, so he takes a final trip around the safe fantasy world of his subconscious before he has to return to the real world.

=== Special ===
No. overall	No. in series	Title	Original release date
13	1	"Locked In"	20 November 2009

=== Series Three ===
No. overall	No. in series	Title	Original release date
14	1	"Ladies and Gentlemen"	24 November 2009
Ben is now conscious and being driven back home. But is he ready to face reality?
15	2	"Loneliness Is a Crowded Head"	1 December 2009
Outside life is a little fraught for Ben, with people trying to do everything for him except leave him alone. Luckily, he's able to find an island refuge inside his mind.
16	3	"Stirrings in the Night"	8 December 2009
Ben and Mary's love life is in jeopardy, so inside Ben's mind Lord Byron is recruited to offer the couple some useful relationship advice.
17	4	"Victoria"	15 December 2009
18	5	"When Was the Last Time You Saw Your Godfather?"	22 December 2009
19	6	"The Stand-In"	29 December 2009

== See also ==
- Brian Gulliver's Travels
