= Truly, Madly, Bletchley =

UK radio program

- Genre: Comedy
- Running time: 15 min
- Country of origin: United Kingdom
- Language: English
- Home station: BBC Radio 4
- Starring: Julian Dutton; Liz Fraser, David Battley, Toby Longworth, Simon Godley
- Written by: Julian Dutton
- Produced by: Dirk Maggs
- Original release: 1997 – 1999
- No. of series: 2
- No. of episodes: 12

Truly, Madly, Bletchley is a BBC Radio 4 comedy series from 1997 written by and starring comedian and impressionist Julian Dutton and produced by Dirk Maggs. Series 2 was produced by Andy Aliffe.

Starring Julian Dutton, Liz Fraser, David Battley, Toby Longworth and Simon Godley, Truly, Madly, Bletchley follows a group of councillors who decide to start their own public access cable radio show.

A surreal take on small-town life, the series mixed stream-of-consciousness sketches with a nod to the vivacious world of 1950s variety, including a musical interlude from spoof tea-dance band, Enrico Valdez and his Orchestra, with accordionist Micky Binelli and singer Cleo Rocos, of Kenny Everett Show fame. In series two, the cast included Stephen Critchlow, Matthew Bell and Peter Hugo-Daly.

The show attracted praise from reviewers: the Independent on Sunday described it as "The most confident radio sitcom since The Navy Lark".
