= The Secret Rapture (film) =

- Original poster
- Directed by: Howard Davies
- Written by: David Hare
- Produced by: Simon Relph
- Starring: Juliet Stevenson; Joanne Whalley-Kilmer; Penelope Wilton; Neil Pearson
- Cinematography: Ian Wilson
- Edited by: George Akers
- Music by: Richard Hartley
- Distributed by: Oasis Film Distribution
- Release dates: 12 September 1993 (TIFF); 3 June 1994 (United Kingdom)
- Running time: 97 minutes
- Country: United Kingdom
- Language: English
- Box office: $18,719 (US)

The Secret Rapture is a 1993 British drama film directed by Howard Davies and starring Juliet Stevenson, Joanne Whalley-Kilmer, Penelope Wilton and Neil Pearson. The screenplay by David Hare is based on his 1988 play.

== Plot ==
Estranged sisters Isobel and Marion are forced to reunite when their father dies and they must decide how to handle Katherine, their young, alcoholic, mentally unstable stepmother who has been left nothing but the rural home in which they were raised. Isobel and her lover Patrick own a small graphic design company that is struggling to stay afloat. Her sister suggests she and her born-again Christian husband Tom help them expand the business by finding investors and making Katherine a partner responsible for finding new business. Isobel has grave misgivings about the plan, but finally agrees to it when Marion convinces Patrick of its potential success. Before long, the strain of running the expanded business impacts Isobel's relationship with Patrick, who is becoming increasingly dependent upon her, while at the same time Katherine's tenuous hold on sanity begins to unravel.

== Cast ==
- Juliet Stevenson as Isobel Coleridge
- Joanne Whalley-Kilmer as Katherine Coleridge
- Penelope Wilton as Marion French
- Neil Pearson as Patrick Steadman
- Alan Howard as Tom French
- Robert Stephens as Max Lopert
- Hilton McRae as Norman
- Robert Glenister as Jeremy
- Finty Williams as Greta

== Production ==
The film was made on location in Exmoor in Somerset.

== Release ==
The film premiered at the Toronto International Film Festival on 12 September 1993. It opened at the Cinema Third Avenue in New York City on 29 April 1994 and grossed $18,719 during its four-week run there. It went into release in the UK on 3 June 1994 on 7 screens where it grossed £17,232 in its opening weekend.

== Critical reception ==
Stephen Holden of The New York Times thought the film's "emotional texture is considerably richer than the Broadway production. And its wrenching performances and dark, clammy atmosphere cast an unsettling chill." He added, "Much of the power of the film . . . lies in the lurching unpredictability of its story . . . In observing the characters up close, the film exudes an emotional intensity that was missing from the more politically pointed Broadway production. As dislikable as Marion may be, Ms. Wilton's portrayal allows us enough glimpses through her mask of hard self-sufficiency to suggest the fearful, unloved child beneath. Isobel, with her outpourings of concern and conscience, is far more sympathetic. But Ms. Stevenson also doesn't shy away from showing the character's streaks of stubbornness and hysteria. The film's flashiest performance belongs to Ms. Whalley-Kilmer as the impulsive, sexually magnetic Katherine. At moments she oddly suggests a young, tipsy Joan Collins whose bravado cannot conceal her lack of an inner core. The film's biggest flaw is its attempt to compress too much story into too little space, in scenes that shift abruptly from character to character."

Leonard Klady of Variety called the film "fitfully successful" and observed, "Howard Davies provides an appropriately somber tone for this tale of blood rivalries and emotional manipulation. Yet the relentless weightiness of the proceedings wears down the viewer and limits the film's appeal to a specialized audience . . . Existing in a holding room between upscale kitchen-sink reality and allegory, The Secret Rapture challenges the director and performers to find their ground. Stevenson effects a powerful, strident and unpleasant pose that ultimately works against the material. Others in the cast are less successful in finding a balance, though Whalley-Kilmer gains our sympathies in an eccentric, bravura [performance]. Ultimately Hare and Davies fail to bring us into or make us sympathize with this rather cold environment."

Adam Mars-Jones of The Independent noted, "In the theatre, the changes that affect two very different sisters when their father dies and his much younger lover is unleashed into their lives may have carried conviction. On screen, the rollercoaster rate of power reversal and the sheer abruptness of the characters' U-turn give the melodrama a foreshortened quality that is unintentionally comic . . . But there is considerable fascination in watching Whalley-Kilmer and Stevenson share the screen."
