= I've Never Seen Star Wars (TV series) =

- Created by: Bill Dare
- Directed by: Pati Marr
- Presented by: Marcus Brigstocke (2009); Jo Brand (2011)
- Country of origin: United Kingdom
- Original language: English
- No. of series: 1
- No. of episodes: 9

Production
- Producer: Bill Dare
- Production company: BBC

Original release
- Network: BBC Four
- Release: 12 March – 30 April 2009
- Network: BBC Two
- Release: 27 December 2011

Related
- I've Never Seen Star Wars (radio series)

I've Never Seen Star Wars is a comedy chat show broadcast on BBC Four (2009 episodes) and BBC Two (2011 episodes), first broadcast on 12 March 2009. Created and produced by Bill Dare and hosted by Marcus Brigstocke for the 2009 episodes and Jo Brand for the 2011 special episode, each episode features a celebrity guest trying out new experiences. Based on the original radio version broadcast on BBC Radio 4, the title comes from the fact that Dare has never seen the Star Wars films. An eight part series was recorded in March 2009, with guests including John Humphrys, Esther Rantzen, Rory McGrath and Hugh Dennis.

A new host, Jo Brand, presented a December 2011 episode.

== Format ==
Each episode of I've Never Seen Star Wars features a different guest trying things they have never done before, and seeing whether they liked their experiences or not. Some of the experiences come from the show's special list, which contains a range of different experiences, such as certain books, films, foodstuffs etc. The experiences tend to be a mixture of things from the list and things the guest wants to try out themselves. The guest and Brigstocke try out the experience and the guest gives their view on it, as well as giving each experiences a mark out of ten.

=== Series 1 ===
No.	Original release date	Guest
1	12 March 2009	Clive Anderson
Going in an isolation tank – 5/10; Reading Men are From Mars, Women are From Venus – 6/10; Playing the National Lottery – 0/10; Watching Withnail and I – 9/10; Having a judo lesson – 9/10
2	19 March 2009	John Humphrys
Listening to Michael Jackson's Thriller – 10/10; Reading The Da Vinci Code – 0/10 for literary merit, 10/10 for story telling; Listening to The Chris Moyles Show – 5/10; Drinking Starbucks coffee – 0/10
3	26 March 2009	Rory McGrath
Watching Fawlty Towers – 2/10; Going to see Swan Lake and taking a ballet lesson – 10/10; Listening to Pink Floyd's The Dark Side of the Moon – 9/10; Reading Emma by Jane Austen – 7/10; Hair straightening – 10/10
4	2 April 2009	Emily Maitlis
Riding a motorbike – 8/10; Watching The Godfather – 5 or 6/10; Playing a video game (Wii Sports) – 4/10; Reading The Satanic Verses by Salman Rushdie – 2/10; Listening to Dolly Parton – 9/10
5	9 April 2009	Hugh Dennis
Going down a coal mine – 5/10; Reading Jeremy Clarkson's books – 6/10; Eating roadkill – 9/10
6	16 April 2009	Nigel Havers
Watching The Simpsons – 11/10; Getting a tattoo – 10/10; Eating a McDonald's Big Mac Meal – 7/10 (8 for the sandwich, 6 for the meal); Listening to The Smiths Hatful Of Hollow - 7/10
7	23 April 2009	David Davis
Watching The Day Today – 6/10; Listening to The Sex Pistols' Never Mind the Bollocks – 1/10; Trying reflexology – 6/10; Reading High Fidelity by Nick Hornby – 9/10
8	30 April 2009	Esther Rantzen
Watching Alien – 8/10; Listening to Hip-hop – 5/10 (10 for The Black Eyed Peas, 0 for the rest); Reading Being Jordan by Katie Price – 9.5/10

=== Special ===
No.	Original release date	Guest
1	27 December 2011	Stephen Fry
Getting an Ear piercing – 8/10; Assembling Ready-to-assemble furniture – 1/10; Watching Only Fools and Horses – 9.5/10; Having a boxing bout – 10/10

== Notes ==
- I've Never Seen Star Wars (The TV Version) – Episode Guide. Published by the British Comedy Guide. Retrieved 2009-03-02.
