= Neil Pearson =

British actor (born 1959)

- Born: Neil John Pearson; 27 April 1959 (age 67); London, England
- Education: Royal Central School of Speech and Drama
- Occupation: Actor
- Years active: 1980–present
- Television: Drop the Dead Donkey (1990–1998); Between The Lines (1992–1994); Waterloo Road (2014–2015); In the Club (2014–2016)

Neil John Pearson (born 27 April 1959) is a British actor, known for his work on television. He was nominated for the 1994 BAFTA TV Award for Best Actor for Between the Lines (1992–1994). His other television roles include Drop the Dead Donkey (1990–1998), All the Small Things (2009), Waterloo Road (2014–2015), and In the Club (2014–2016). His film appearances include all four of the Bridget Jones films. He is also an antiquarian book dealer who specialises in the expatriate literary movement of Paris between the World Wars.

== Early life ==
Pearson grew up in Battersea and Balham, London. His father, a panel beater, left home when he was five; his mother was a legal secretary. He was a boarder at Woolverstone Hall School near Ipswich, Suffolk where he first learned to act. He attended the Central School of Speech and Drama from 1977 to 1980.

== Stage, television and film work ==
One of Pearson's early appearances was in 1984 alongside Leonard Rossiter in Joe Orton's play Loot at the Lyric Theatre in London; Rossiter died in his dressing-room during a later performance. He won a part in Hat Trick Productions' sitcom Chelmsford 123 and also appeared with Hat Trick executive Jimmy Mulville in That's Love. Pearson narrated Colin Wyatt's animated series The Poddington Peas in 1986.

It was in the roles of associate editor and office lothario and gambling addict, Dave Charnley, in the sitcom Drop the Dead Donkey – another Hat Trick show – and of Detective Superintendent Tony Clark in the thriller Between the Lines (1992–94), that he made his greatest impact on the viewing public.

Since then he has appeared in such varied roles as Dr Jameson in Rhodes (1996), Jack Green in the children's serial The Magician's House (1999), Trevor Heslop in Trevor's World of Sport (2003) and John Diamond in A Lump in My Throat (2003). He has also been in several films, including The Secret Rapture (1993), Fever Pitch (1997) and Bridget Jones's Diary (2001). He played Major Steve Arnold, the American interrogator, in Taking Sides at the Yvonne Arnaud Theatre in 2003. He played Rob in The Booze Cruise (2003), and then also in the second and third sequels in 2005 and 2006. He appeared in the 2006 Radio Four series Vent as Ben. He played the choirmaster Michael Caddick in the BBC drama All the Small Things in 2009. He also appeared in episodes of Midsomer Murders and Lewis – in the former, appearing alongside Drop the Dead Donkey co-star Jeff Rawle; and in the latter, again playing a gambling addict alongside Haydn Gwynne, another star of Drop the Dead Donkey – and played Doug Anderson in an episode of Death in Paradise in 2013.

In the Inspector George Gently episode Goodbye to China (2011), Pearson acts as a former Sergeant of DCI Gently, who now has risen in rank above his former master. In 2014 Pearson became a series regular in Waterloo Road as new headteacher Vaughan Fitzgerald.

Pearson was a judge on Channel 4's The Play's the Thing, which sought to find a play written by an unknown writer for a run in the West End. The winning play, written by Kate Betts, was called On the Third Day and opened at the New Ambassadors Theatre in London in June 2006. Pearson appeared in a touring revival of Sir Peter Hall's production of Harold Pinter's Old Times in 2006, and in a production of Tom Stoppard's play Arcadia at the Duke of York's Theatre, London, in 2009.

After obtaining a collection of original Hancock's Half Hour radio scripts and realising that some of the corresponding recordings no longer existed, he conceived and subsequently co-produced The Missing Hancocks, a series of re-creations of selected wiped episodes for BBC Radio 4, which debuted in October 2014.

In 2020, he was in season 8, episode 4 of Father Brown. He also appeared as Eric Morley in an episode of The Reckoning (2023), a miniseries about the life of Jimmy Savile.

Pearson has acted in several BBC Radio Dramas including the black comedy series Vent as comatose writer Ben Smith, adaptations of the Martin Beck novels playing Beck's sidekick Detective Lennart Kollberg, and House of Ghosts: A Case for Inspector Morse where he played the late Colin Dexter's iconic fictional detective Inspector Morse.

== Antiquarian book business ==
Pearson is the author of a book on the publisher Jack Kahane, Obelisk: A History of Jack Kahane and the Obelisk Press. He is a collector of rare drama scripts and in 2011 he opened an online bookshop specialising in theatrical material. He has a special interest in the expatriate literary movement of Paris between the wars.

== Personal interests ==
He strongly identifies with the British Left, having made a party election broadcast for the Labour Party for the 1994 European Elections, though he later supported Ken Livingstone when Livingstone ran as an independent candidate for Mayor of London in 2000. For many years he has also supported the National Council for One Parent Families, having written about his family background for the organisation, and also raised £32,000 for the charity on a celebrity edition of Who Wants to Be a Millionaire?.

He is a keen Texas hold 'em poker player and participated in the 2007 World Series of Poker Europe event in London. Pearson is also a fan of Tottenham Hotspur and regularly attends home games. In 2007 he assisted with fundraising to renovate the Bristol Old Vic Theatre.

== Filmography ==
Key
| † | Denotes works that have not yet been released |

=== Film ===
| Year | Title | Role | Notes |
|---|---|---|---|
| 1982 | Oi for England | Napper | Television film |
| 1983 | Privates on Parade | Pianist | |
| 1983 | Submariners | 'Cock' Roach | Television film |
| 1988 | The Bell-Run | Joe Glover | Television film |
| 1989 | Work Experience | Greg | Short film |
| 1993 | The Secret Rapture | Patrick Steadman | |
| 1995 | Latin for a Dark Room | William | Short film |
| 1997 | Fever Pitch | Mr. Ashworth | |
| 1998 | Heaven on Earth | Richard Bennett | Television film |
| 1999 | Bostock's Cup | Gerry Tudor | Television film |
| 1999 | The Mystery of Men | Julian Wyatt | Television film |
| 2001 | Bridget Jones's Diary | Richard Finch | |
| 2001 | Trance | Brendan | Television film |
| 2001 | A Lump in My Throat | John Diamond | Television film |
| 2003 | The Booze Cruise | Rob | Television film |
| 2004 | Bridget Jones: The Edge of Reason | Richard Finch | |
| 2005 | The Booze Cruise II: The Treasure Hunt | Rob | Television film |
| 2006 | The Booze Cruise III: The Scattering | Rob | Television film |
| 2006 | The Kindness of Strangers | Joe Farrelly | Television film |
| 2007 | Clapham Junction | Frank Winterton | Television film |
| 2007 | Frankenstein | Professor Waldman | Television film |
| 2008 | Pictures | Matthew | Short film |
| 2010 | On Expenses | Hugh Tomlinson | Television film |
| 2014 | The Portrait | Roger | Short film |
| 2016 | ID2: Shadwell Army | Dave | |
| 2016 | Bridget Jones's Baby | Richard Finch | |
| 2017 | In Extremis | Doctor | |
| 2025 | Bridget Jones: Mad About the Boy | Richard Finch | |

=== Television ===
| Year | Title | Role | Notes |
|---|---|---|---|
| 1982 | Play for Tomorrow | Adam | Episode: "Shades" |
| 1985 | Drummonds | Andy Sykes | Recurring role; 5 episodes |
| 1987 | Up Line | Nik Targett | Miniseries; 4 episodes |
| 1987 | Intimate Contact | Morrie | Miniseries; 4 episodes |
| 1988 | Les Girls | Adman | Episode: "Spanners" |
| 1988 | ScreenPlay | Jack Bing | Episode: "Eskimos Do It" |
| 1988 | This Is David Lander | Simon Forbes | Episode: "Reduced to Tears" |
| 1988–1990 | Chelmsford 123 | Mungo | Series regular; 13 episodes |
| 1989 | The Poddington Peas | Narrator | Series regular; 13 episodes |
| 1989–1992 | That's Love | Gary | Series regular; 15 episodes |
| 1990 | Harry Enfield's Television Programme | War Correspondent | Episode: "Series 1, Episode 1" |
| 1990–2008 | Drop the Dead Donkey | Dave Charnley | Series regular; 66 episodes |
| 1991 | Shrinks | Peter McCraken | Episode: "Episode 5" |
| 1992–1994 | Between the Lines | Tony Clark | Series regular; 35 episodes |
| 1996 | Screen Two | Tom Peel | Episode: "Crossing the Floor" |
| 1996 | Rhodes | Dr. Leander Starr Jameson | Miniseries; 7 episodes |
| 1997 | See You Friday | Greg | Recurring role; 2 episodes |
| 1999–2000 | The Magician's House | Jack Green | Series regular; 12 episodes |
| 2000 | Dirty Work | Leo Beckett | Series regular; 6 episodes |
| 2001 | The Whistle-Blower | Dominic Tracey | Miniseries; 2 episodes |
| 2001 | Armadillo | Rintoul | Miniseries; 3 episodes |
| 2002 | Murder in Mind | Stuart Wilsher | Episode: "Memories" |
| 2003 | Trevor's World of Sport | Trevor Heslop | Series regular; 7 episodes |
| 2006 | The State Within | Phil Lonsdale | Miniseries; 6 episodes |
| 2006 | Terry Pratchett's Hogfather | Quoth the Raven | Miniseries; 2 episodes |
| 2008 | Lewis | Dr. Stringer | Episode: "And the Moonbeams Kiss the Sea" |
| 2008 | Apparitions | Governor Lassiter | Episode: "Episode 3" |
| 2009 | All the Small Things | Michael Caddick | Series regular; 6 episodes |
| 2010 | Agatha Christie's Marple | Inspector Lejeune | Episode: "The Pale Horse" |
| 2011 | Midsomer Murders | Eddie Stanton | Episode: "Dark Secrets" |
| 2011 | Inspector George Gently | Alan Shepherd | Episode: "Goodbye China" |
| 2012 | Monroe | Alistair Gillespie | Series regular; 6 episodes |
| 2013 | Death in Paradise | Doug Anderson | Episode: "A Dash of Sunshine" |
| 2014–2015 | Waterloo Road | Vaughan Fitzgerald | Series regular; 20 episodes |
| 2014–2016 | In the Club | Jonathan Lambert | Recurring role; 6 episodes |
| 2017 | The Other One | Paul | Episode: "Pilot" |
| 2019 | Sticks and Stones | Phil | Miniseries; 1 episode |
| 2020 | Father Brown | Sir Toby Dobson | Episode: "The Wisdom of the Fool" |
| 2023 | The Reckoning | Eric Morley | Miniseries; 1 episode |
| 2024 | Silent Witness | DI Steve Tudor | Episode: "Kings Cross" |
