= Ashley Blaker =

British comedian and television producer

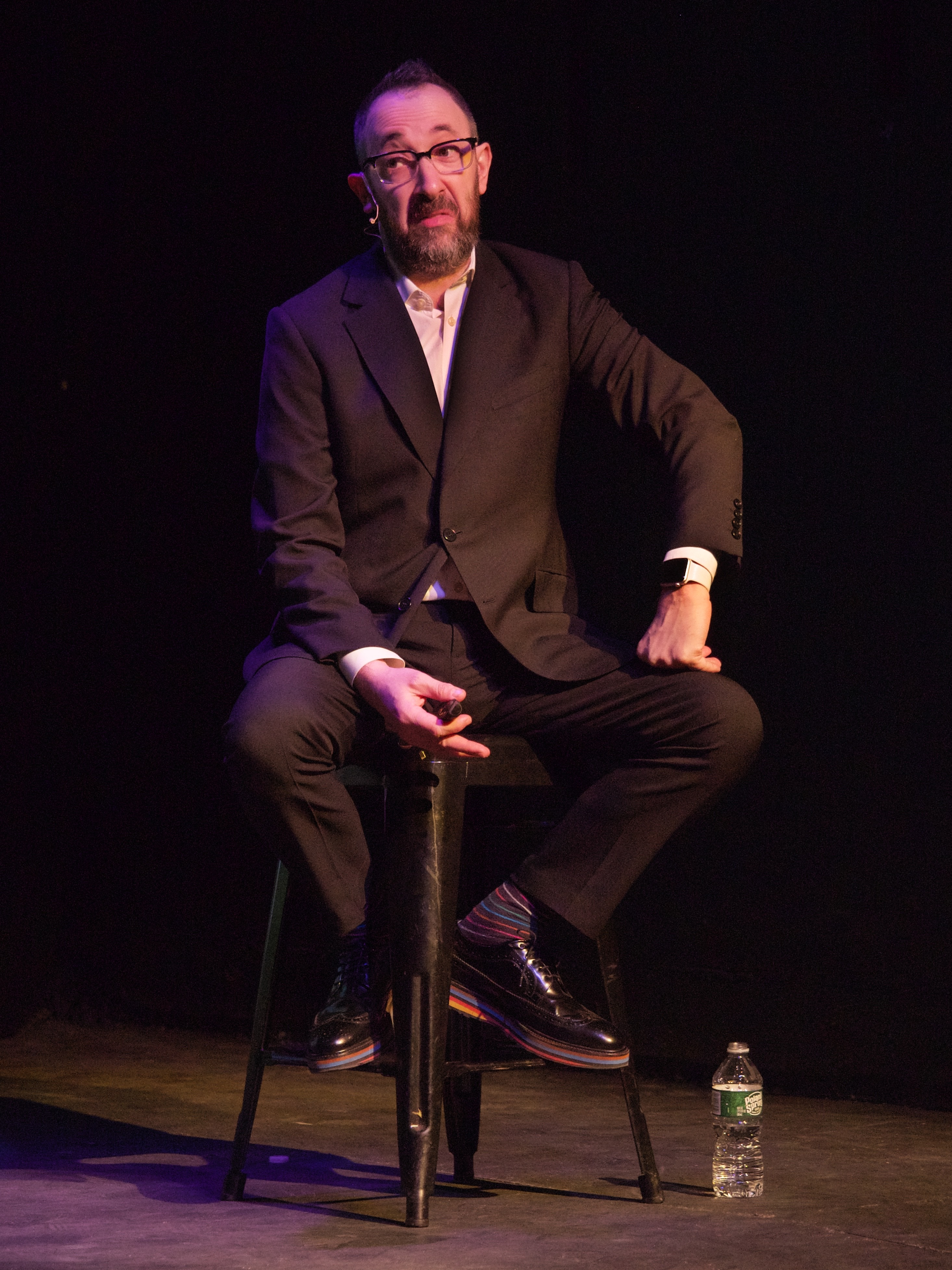
- Blaker in 2020
- Born: Ashley Blaker; London, UK
- Education: Oxford University, Cambridge University
- Notable work: Little Britain

Comedy career
- Medium: Television, radio, stand-up
- Genres: Stand-up comedy, satire, observational comedy
- Subjects: Human interaction, religion, Judaism, family
- Website: ashleyblaker.com

Ashley Blaker is a British comedy writer and performer, radio and television producer and author. Blaker is a longtime collaborator with Matt Lucas: he was producer of Little Britain and Rock Profile. He also co-created and wrote The Matt Lucas Awards, and appeared in one episode.

As a stand-up comedian, Blaker's first Off-Broadway show, Strictly Unorthodox, opened in May 2017 at The Theater Center. and his second Off-Broadway show, Goy Friendly opened in February 2020, at the SoHo Playhouse. Much of Blaker's stand-up material until the early 2020s was related to him being an Orthodox Jew. Matt Lucas, amongst others, described Blaker as "the UK's only Orthodox comedian". After "12 years of immersion in the Charedi world", Blaker stopped being observant.

More recently, Blaker has focused on performing and writing. He has appeared in a number of comedy series for BBC Radio 4 and authored a book.

== Career ==
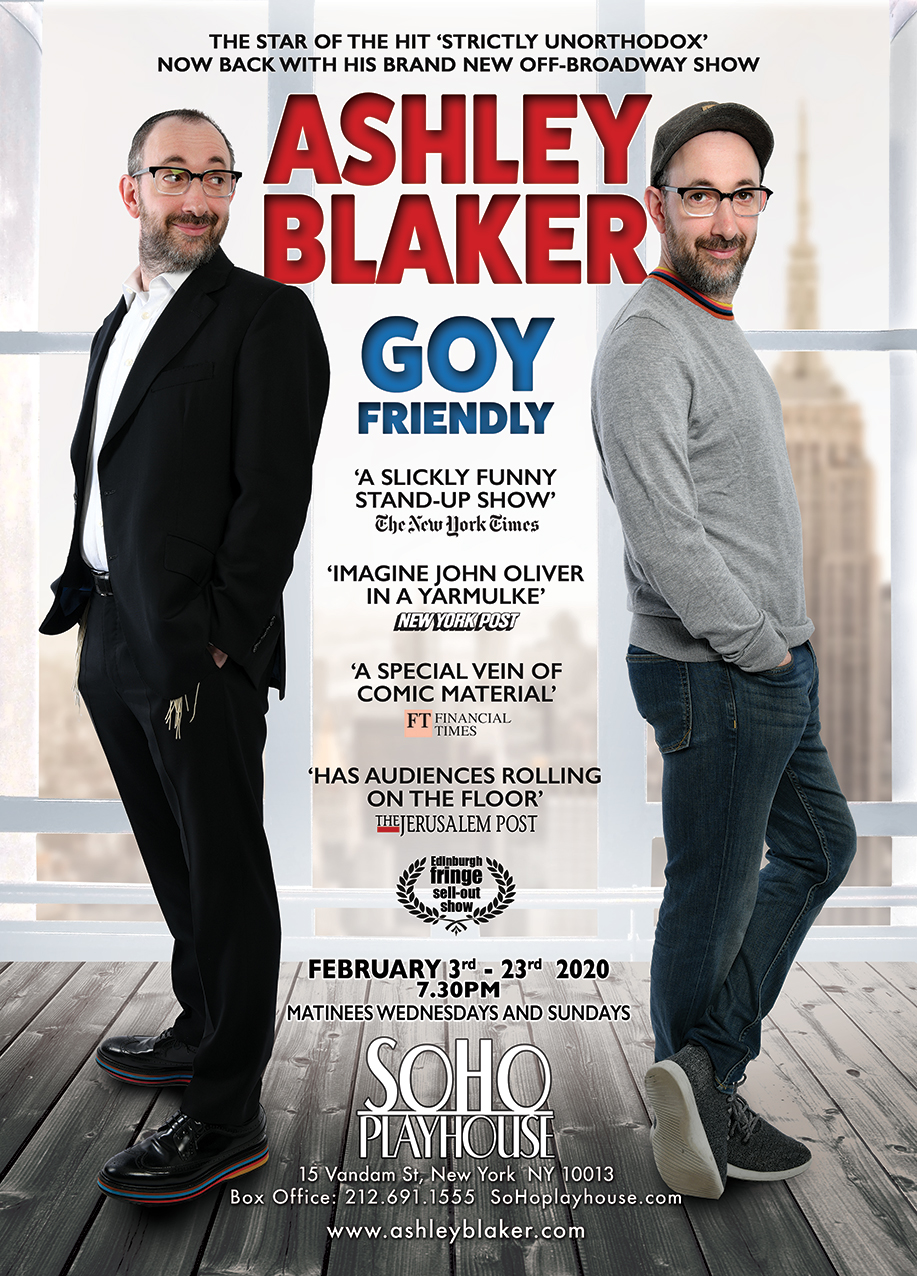
Poster for Goy Friendly

=== Producer ===
Blaker began working for the BBC as a trainee radio producer, after completing one of their graduate courses. In 1999, he bumped into his old school friend Matt Lucas on a London street; it proved a turning point for both of them. Lucas had pitched the idea of Little Britain to the controller of BBC Two, Jane Root. Blaker suggested turning it into a radio show and despite the initial reluctance of Lucas' writing partner David Walliams, they decided to press ahead. The show launched in 2000, and Blaker produced two series on the radio before the show switched to TV in 2003.

With Little Britain under way, the same team collaborated on Rock Profile. The first series was broadcast in 1999, consisting of 13 episodes on digital channel Play UK, with subsequent series appearing on BBC Two.

From 2012-13, Blaker was the producer, as well as co-creator and co-writer (alongside Matt Lucas) of the BBC One television show, The Matt Lucas Awards, appearing on-screen in one episode.

In 2019, Blaker produced Little Brexit, a one-off Little Britain special, featuring the original cast, that was broadcast on 31 October 2019 on BBC Radio 4. The concept was created due to Brexit, the UK's withdrawal from the EU. Lucas and Walliams both returned for this episode.

=== Stand-up comedian ===
In 2017, Blaker was commissioned by the BBC to create a show called Ashley Blaker's Goyish Guide To Judaism, described as "an insider's view of his religion"". It was broadcast in June 2018 as part of BBC Radio Four's Stand-Up Specials series. A follow-up was commissioned and broadcast in 2019.

Blaker's stand-up show, Observant Jew, was part of the 2018 Edinburgh Festival Fringe. In 2019, he performed a UK tour titled Prophet Sharing alongside Muslim comedian Imran Yusuf.

In August 2020, a new four-part series, Ashley Blaker: 6.5 Children was commissioned from Blaker by BBC Radio 4; broadcast started in July 2021. A second series followed in 2023.

In 2025, "Ashley Blaker's Hyperfixations", co-starring Kieran Hodgson and Rosie Holt, was broadcast by Radio 4.

=== Author ===
Blaker has written a book, titled Normal Schmormal: My occasionally helpful guide to parenting kids with special needs. Published by HarperCollins, and serialised by the Sunday Times, it was described by the Daily Mirror as "brilliantly funny". He performed an Edinburgh Fringe show in 2023 and UK tour in 2024 both also called Normal Schmormal.

== Critical reception ==
His material has been described by The New York Times as being different from most other Jewish comics': "In contrast to most overtly Jewish comedy, which usually compares Jews and gentiles, most of his material juxtaposes the frum and not frum." The paper's review described him as "a skilled joke-teller with none of the borscht belt timing you would expect from a Catskills comic. And since we rarely hear the perspective of the ultra-Orthodox in comedy clubs, there's a pleasing freshness about an act that offers a look into a world often hidden from public view."

The Daily Telegraph reviewed Hyperfixations, calling it "a lovely show". Specifically, the opening episode, on seventeenth-century English History, included "some great gags, some awful gags and some wonderfully nerdy gags about how Morris dancing may have caused the English Civil War."

== Personal life ==
Blaker was educated at the Haberdashers' Aske's Boys' School, a school that produced a number of comedians at around the same time. He is four years younger than alumnus Sacha Baron Cohen, but wasn't at the school at the same time as David Baddiel. Most significantly, Blaker became friends at school with Matt Lucas, with whom he went on to create Little Britain. He is a graduate of both Oxford and Cambridge.

Blaker embraced Orthodox Judaism in his early twenties. By 2024, he was no longer observant. Blaker said in 2026 that his time as an Orthodox Jew was an example of a "hyperfixation" similar to when he was an obsessive supporter of Liverpool FC. When on the BBC's Pilgrimage series that year, he had what he described as a "visceral reaction" to the practices of a Reform synagogue, which he likened to supporting Everton or Manchester United.

Blaker has six children, who in 2024, were aged 10–20. Three of his children have special educational needs, which has been the topic for some of his work, notably his book. Aged 47, Blaker himself was diagnosed with ADHD and autism spectrum disorder.

=== External links ===
- Episode details of Ashley Blaker's Hyperfixations

=== Bibliography ===
- Lucas, Matt (2017). Little Me. London: Canongate. ISBN 978-1786890863.
