= Susan Jeffers (psychologist) =

American psychologist and self-help author

Susan Jeffers (March 3, 1938 – October 27, 2012, 74 years old) was an American psychologist and author of self-help literature.

== Early life and education ==
Susan Jeffers was born Susan Gildenberg at Hazleton, Pennsylvania on March 3, 1938.

Susan Jeffers started her academic education at Penn State University, but abandoned her studies when she married her first husband. In the years following 1960 the family moved to Manhattan, where Jeffers took degrees, followed by a doctorate in psychology, at Hunter College and at Columbia University.

== Work ==
In 1971 Susan Jeffers became executive director of the Floating Hospital in New York. Then she taught a course about fear at the New School for Social Research

Her self-help book Feel the Fear and Do It Anyway, published in 1987, sold millions of copies and was translated into more than thirty-five languages. In addition to her work as an author Jeffers also held workshops and seminars.

Susan Jeffers died of cancer of unknown primary origin on October 27, 2012 in Los Angeles, California.
