= And the Winner Is (radio series) =

British radio comedy program

And The Winner Is
- Genre: Comedy
- Running time: 30 Minutes
- Country of origin: United Kingdom
- Language(s): English
- Home station: BBC Radio 2
- Starring: Matt Lucas
- Created by: Ashley Blaker; Bill Matthews
- Original release: 25 February 2010

And The Winner Is is a British radio comedy program presented by the comedian Matt Lucas. It was first broadcast in 2010 and airs on BBC Radio 2.

== Format ==
The show takes the format of an awards ceremony known as "The Lucases" (named for the host). In each episode, Lucas would announce a category for the awards (something surreal such as "Sexiest British Prime Minister"), then his three guests would put forward their nominations. After a discussion about why their nominations deserved the award, Lucas himself would decide which nomination was most worthy of the prize. At the end of each show a final award (The Lucas of Lucases) would be given to one of the guests, dependent on the category (Worst Behaved, Most Persusavive etc.)

== Episodes ==
=== Series 1 ===
Winning nominations below are in bold

==== Episode 1 ====
Broadcast Date: 25 February 2010

| Categories | James Corden | Graham Linehan | Katy Brand |
|---|---|---|---|
| Lamest Excuse | Eddie Murphy's excuse for picking up a transvestite prostitute | His mother's excuse involving a cat jumping on a piano | **Hamid Karzai's for signing a bill reducing women's rights in Afghanistan** |
| Most pointless member of the Royal Family | Prince Edward | **Prince Maurice** | Princess Michael of Kent |
| Greatest song by an otherwise bad artist | **Angry Anderson, Suddenly** | Genesis, Follow You Follow Me | Radiohead, Paranoid Android |

Lucas of Lucases (Most Passionate Guest): James Corden

==== Episode 2 ====
Broadcast Date: 4 March 2010

| Categories | Josie Long | David Schneider | Robert Popper |
|---|---|---|---|
| Most Incomprehensible British Accent | Glasgow | Tim Westwood | **Ulster** |
| Least Practical Pet | Mayfly | A dead dog | **Blue whale** |
| Best War | **The First World War** | The War of the Worlds | Pig War |
| Worst Song by an otherwise reputable artist | **Jay-Z, Hard Knock Life** | David Bowie, The Laughing Gnome | R.E.M., Shiny Happy People |

Lucas of Lucases (Unluckiest Guest): David Schnieder

==== Episode 3 ====
Broadcast Date: 11 March 2010

| Categories | Sarah Millican | Richard Herring | David Walliams |
|---|---|---|---|
| Sexiest British Prime Minister | Margaret Thatcher | Spencer Perceval | **John Major** |
| Least Deserving Celebrity | Victoria Beckham | Peaches Geldof | **Queen Elizabeth II** |
| Most effective diet | **Divorce** | **Eat Less and Exercise More** | **The Diet Matt was on*** |
| Least Boring Shakespeare Play | **The Baz Luhrmann Romeo and Juliet Film** | Macbeth | No Sex Please, We're British |

Lucas of Lucases (Worst Behaved Guest): Richard Herring

- All three won the award, as Matt had lost weight by both getting divorce and eating less and exercising more

==== Episode 4 ====
Broadcast Date: 18 March 2010

| Categories | Jo Caulfield | Jon Richardson | Stephen K Amos |
|---|---|---|---|
| Most Disappointing Film Sequel | **Jaws 2** | Friday the 13th Part VIII: Jason Takes Manhattan | All Rocky sequels |
| Most Unhelpful Proverb | Every Cloud has a Silver Lining | A Little of What You Fancy | **A Stitch in time saves nine** |
| Greatest Couple | Cagney and Lacey | Romeo and Juliet | **The Queen and Prince Philip** |
| Most Depressing School Subject | Art | Technology | **P.E.** |

Lucas of Lucases (Most Argumentative Guest): Jon Richardson

==== Episode 5 ====
Broadcast Date: 25 March 2010

| Categories | Scott Capurro | Andrew Maxwell | Adam Bloom |
|---|---|---|---|
| Most Untrustworthy Profession | President of Iran or Iraq | TV Executive | **Burglar** |
| Weariest Cliche | Change We Need | More Fish in the Sea | **Not What You Know, It's Who You Know** |
| Best German* | Albert Einstein | Patrick Suskind | Nena |
| Best Theme tune to a boring TV show | Quincy, M.E. | Are You Being Served? | **The Cricket theme tune** |

Lucas of Lucases (Guest with most absurd argument): Scott Capurro

- No award given

==== Episode 6 ====
First Broadcast: 1 April 2010

| Categories | Tom Baker | Alex MacQueen | Bob Mortimer |
|---|---|---|---|
| Most Redundant Technology | Flat irons | Hoover | **Big Mouth Billy Bass** |
| Greatest Historical Fattie | Falstaff | Winston Churchill | **George IV** (originally Friar Tuck) |
| Worst Holiday Destination | Palma, Majorca | Littlehampton | **The Caribbean** |
| Worst Ever Vocal Performance | Lee Marvin, "Wand'rin' Star" | Boney M, "Brown Girl in the Ring" | **The Cheeky Girls** |

Lucas of Lucases (Politest Guest): Tom Baker

=== References ===
BBC Site And The Winner Is at British Comedy Guide
