= Bill Dare =

English comedy writer (1960–2025)

- Born: William Dare Jones; 16 May 1960; Westminster, London, England
- Died: 2 March 2025 (aged 64)
- Education: University of Manchester
- Occupations: Author, director, writer, producer
- Known for: Dead Ringers; The Now Show
- Parent(s): Peter Jones and Jeri Jones

William Dare Jones (16 May 1960 – 2 March 2025), known professionally as Bill Dare, was an English writer and producer of radio and television comedy programmes.

== Early life ==
Bill Dare Jones was born in Westminster, London on 16 May 1960, the son of actor, screenwriter and broadcaster Peter Jones. He attended Manchester University.

== Career ==
Dare was an author and producer/devisor of various (mainly comedy) programmes mainly for BBC Radio and television, including The Mary Whitehouse Experience, Dead Ringers, The Now Show, The Late Edition, I've Never Seen Star Wars and The Secret World, and Brian Gulliver's Travels. He was also the producer of eight series of ITV's Spitting Image. A notable feature of the radio version of Dead Ringers was Jon Culshaw imitating the voice of Tom Baker at the end of the credits, saying Dare's name in an exaggerated fashion.

== Personal life and death ==
Dare had a daughter from a relationship with Mary Downes. He married Lucy Jagger in 2020.

Dare died in a car accident on 1 March 2025 whilst on holiday in Colombia, aged 64. He was a passenger in the vehicle, and his death was announced by his agent two days later.

Many comedians and industry colleagues paid tribute to Bill Dare. Dead Ringers dedicated their 25th Anniversary Tour to his memory. Dead Ringers star Jon Culshaw remembered Dare as the "wisest comedy alchemist and the dearest, dearest friend."
