= Annette Badland =

British actress (born 1950)

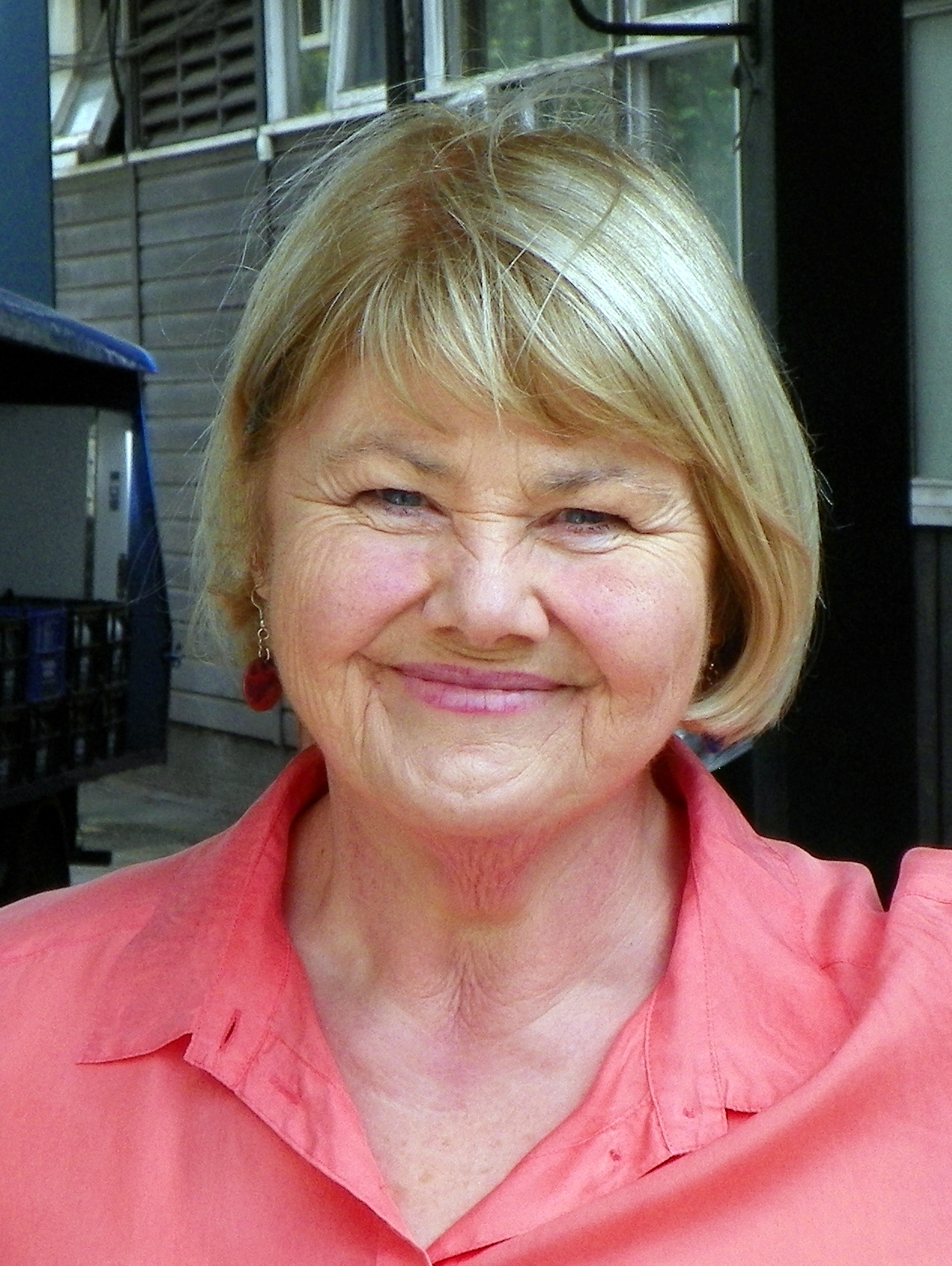
- Badland in 2016
- Born: 26 August 1950 (age 76); Edgbaston, Birmingham, England
- Education: East 15 Acting School
- Occupation: Actress
- Years active: 1970–present
- Notable work: Doctor Who; Cutting It; Wizards vs Aliens; EastEnders; Outlander; The Sparticle Mystery; Bergerac; The Archers; Midsomer Murders; Ted Lasso
- Spouse: David Hatton (died 2024)

Annette Badland (born 26 August 1950) is a British actress known for a wide range of roles on television, radio, stage, and film. She is best known for her roles as Charlotte in the BBC crime drama series Bergerac, Margaret Blaine in the BBC science fiction series Doctor Who, Mrs Glenna Fitzgibbons in the first season of Outlander, Babe Smith in the BBC soap opera EastEnders, Dr Fleur Perkins on the ITV mystery series Midsomer Murders, and as Mae Green in the Apple TV+ comedy-drama Ted Lasso. She was nominated for the Laurence Olivier Award for Best Actress in a Supporting Role in 1993 for her performance as Sadie in Jim Cartwright's play The Rise and Fall of Little Voice; a role she reprised in the 1998 film adaptation Little Voice.

== Early life and education ==
Annette Badland was born in Edgbaston, Birmingham. Her mother, originally from Loanhead, Scotland, relocated to Birmingham during World War II to work as a munitions and aircraft worker in the factories, where she met Badland's father. Her family often returned to Scotland for holidays and to visit family, and sometimes they holidayed in Wales.

Badland trained in acting at East 15 Acting School in Loughton, Essex, working in "rep" at Southwold Summer Theatre during her time there. Her performance as the maid in Private Lives for the Summer 1970 season earned her an Equity Card and the right to work in the professional theatre.

== Career ==
=== Theatre ===
After drama school, Badland joined Ian McKellen's Actors' Company at the Cambridge Arts Theatre; her first professional productions were in director Noel Willman's Three Arrows (by Iris Murdoch) and Richard Cottrell's Ruling the Roost (Georges Feydeau) in October 1972. After pantomime (Toad of Toad Hall at the Dukes Theatre, Lancaster), at the end of that year she moved on to the 1973 season with the Royal Shakespeare Company at Stratford. Her Audrey in As You Like It was considered an auspicious debut in a leading company.

Badland joined the cast of Jim Cartwright's play The Rise and Fall of Little Voice, which centres on a shy young woman from Lancashire who expresses herself through song, at the Aldwych Theatre from October 1992 through February 1993. In 1994, she starred in Tony Kushner's post-communist tragic comedy Slavs!, which explored the repercussions of the post Soviet era.

The Prime of Miss Jean Brodie, a play adapted from Muriel Sparks's novel about an otherwise inspirational teacher who transpires to have an unhealthy admiration for fascist leaders, saw Badland as headmistress Miss Mackay on London's West End in 1998. She went on to perform opposite Jude Law in both David Lan's 1999 production of 'Tis Pity She's a Whore and his 2002 production of Doctor Faustus at the Young Vic Theatre in London.

In 2006, Badland worked with The Peter Hall Company on two productions at the Theatre Royal in Bath, England. The first was Shakespeare's Measure for Measure, a drama centring on protagonist Isabella's moral dilemma of whether or not to sacrifice her virginity to save her brother. Second was writer Alan Bennett's ensemble piece Habeas Corpus, a farce penned in 1971 and set to modern music of that time. She went on to work with Hall again in 2007 in a production of Noël Coward's The Vortex at London's Apollo Theatre.

During the Tiata Delights Festival in 2009, Badland performed in Zimbabwean playwright Michael Bhim's The Golden Hour, a thriller set in a London hospital where the main character encounters a baby he thinks has been brought to the country illegally. That same year she participated in Hampstead Theatre's (London) fiftieth anniversary season by starring in Michael Frayn's play Alphabetical Order, which is set in a provincial newspaper library. Finishing out 2009, Badland featured as psychic medium Madame Arcat in Noël Coward's comedy Blithe Spirit at the Royal Exchange Theatre in Manchester, England.

With a cast consisting mostly of child actors, Badland starred as the headmistress in 2010's Royal Court Theatre production of Kin, a disturbing play detailing the lives of young girls at boarding school. From there she went on to star in Far Away, Caryl Churchill's dystopian drama where the future is war, at the Bristol Old Vic Theatre.

In 2018, Badland signed on to work with The Globe Theatre in London in their production of Blanche McIntyre's The Winter's Tale, which was broadcast live to theatres in October of that year, and Matt Hartley's Eyam, based upon the true story of a Derbyshire village that voluntarily quarantined themselves during an outbreak of the Black Plague. During the first quarter of 2019, Badland starred in two separate productions, featuring the same cast, at the Sam Wanamaker Playhouse in London. The first was Edward II, where she portrayed Mortimer, and the second was After Edward, a response to Marlowe's Edward II, where she portrayed Gertrude Stein.

In September 2019, Badland was made a patron of The Old Rep Theatre in Birmingham. The theatre dedicated a seat in her honour that reads "Whatever you can do, or dream you can, begin it".

In March 2020 she appeared in Our Lady of Blundellsands, a new play written by Jonathan Harvey as one of the two sisters in the dysfunctional Domingo family.

In September 2021, she was the sole performer in a special event held on the Golden Hind in Brixham Harbour to mark the 131st anniversary of the birth of the crime writer Agatha Christie: fittingly, specific details of the event were not publicised in advance and the audience of 30 was sworn to secrecy.

=== Television ===
Badland's first professional television role was for Thames Television in 1975's feature length biopic The Naked Civil Servant, where she portrayed the tap-dancing pupil. Between 1978 and 1980, she was featured in a series one episode of BBC Two's The Devil's Crown, an episode of Southern Television's Spearhead, ATV's long running serial Crossroads, made-for-TV film Flat Bust, BBC One's Shoestring, and Thames Television's The Dick Emery Hour. From there she secured a recurring role as Charlotte in BBC's crime drama Bergerac (1981–84), a four-episode stint in Thames Television's Bognor, BBC's mini-series Great Expectations, and several episodes of BBC Two's comedy The Last Song.

1982 saw Badland appear in several guest-starring roles in episodic television. ITV's crime drama The Gentle Touch, a police drama set in 1980s Britain, featured her in the series three episode "Solution". She also guest-starred as a nurse in both BBC's period drama Nanny and Thames Television's crime series Minder. In February 1983 she starred as Vera in PBS's comedic mini-series Pictures, set during the era of silent films, which was broadcast on Masterpiece Theatre. Later that year, Badland guest-starred on an episode of BBC Two's satirical mini-series The Old Men At The Zoo, which was based upon Angus Wilson's dystopian novel of the same name. ABC's drama Lace, originally aired in 1984, featured Badland alongside Angela Lansbury and Phoebe Cates. She would reprise her role as Piggy Fassbinder in the 1985 made for TV sequel Lace II. Between those appearances, Badland would feature in Channel 4's made-for-TV film Last Day of Summer, BBC's Two-part mini-series Agatha Christie's Miss Marple: "A Pocket Full of Rye" as Gladys Martin, BBC's made-for-TV film Newstime as Doreen, Channel 4's TV film Sacred Hearts as Sister Mercy and an episode of ITV's children's anthology series Dramarama.

From 1985 to 1986, Badland starred as Christine in ITV's sitcom Troubles and Strife, which revolved around the effect a new young vicar had on the town's women. She went on, the next year, to co-star in the PBS mini-series A Little Princess, based upon Frances Hodgson Burnett's classic children's novel (1905) and a series one episode of the BBC's sitcom You Must Be the Husband. Badland was a regular guest in series one of ITV/Channel 4's comedy sketch series Hale & Pace in 1988 before a turn in a series four episode ("Chinese Whispers", 1989) of BBC's anthology series Screenplay. Following that, she appeared in "The Rough and The Smooth", an episode of All Creatures Great and Small, an episode of BBC's medical drama Casualty, and CBS's made-for-TV film The Pied Piper, alongside Peter O'Toole. From 1990 to 1991, Badland featured as multiple characters in BBC One's children's series Happy Families, which was based upon a set of books by Janet and Allan Ahlberg.

Badland guest-starred in a four-episode stint on BBC's Manchester based comedy Making Out early in 1991 and three episodes of the BBC One children's programme Archer's Goon in 1992. She also featured in two separate episodes, one in 1991 and one in 1993, of the family sitcom 2point4 Children. Returning to BBC's medical drama Casualty for a second time, Badland featured in 1993's series 8 episode "Born Loser". She also appeared in director Andy Wilson's mini-series The Mushroom Picker and director Carol Wiseman's mini-series Goggle Eyes. Between 1993 and 1995, Badland starred as the nurse in BBC's comedy, Inside Victor Lewis-Smith, which was presented as a look into comic and journalist Lewis-Smith's mind while he was in a coma. During that time, she had guest-starring roles on several television programmes, including the BBC drama Smokescreen, comedy Love Hurts with Zoë Wanamaker, Frank Stubbs Promotes with Timothy Spall, Channel 4's comedy Blue Heaven, and children's programme Mike & Angelo.

In 1995, Badland was featured in three episodes of BBC's BAFTA nominated children's programme Jackanory, which featured celebrities reading stories for younger audiences. From there, she guest-starred on a series one episode of Stewart Lee and Richard Herring's comedy sketch showcase Fist of Fun and a series three episode of the British Comedy Award winning show Outside Edge. Between 1995 and 1996, Badland starred as Dolly Buckle in the BBC's drama Black Hearts in Battersea, an adaptation of Joel Aiken's novel of the same name. During that time she also featured in NBC's two part mini-series Gulliver's Travels, BBC's children's series The Demon Headmaster, and director Martyn Friend's made-for-TV movie Cuts.

BBC's gritty crime mini-series Holding On (1997), set in London and following a series of unconnected characters, featured Badland as Brenda in four of the eight episodes. Between 1997 and 1998 she guest-starred in the BBC One children's comedy Mr Wymi, which focused on a young boy who builds a robot butler for his family, and ITV's children's programme The Worst Witch. In 1999, Badland guest-starred for the fourth time on ITV's long-running police procedural The Bill. She appeared in a series seven episode entitled "Vital Statistics" (1991), a series eleven episode entitled "Off Limits" (1995), a series fourteen episode entitled "The Fat Lady Sings" (1998), and a series fifteen episode entitled "Look Again" (1999). That same year, Badland guest-starred on the series two premiere of BBC's medical drama Holby City, TNT's made-for-TV movie A Christmas Carol opposite Patrick Stewart, and ITV's Alan Bleasdale penned mini-series Oliver Twist. In three episodes broadcast between 1999 and 2000, Badland portrayed Aunt Glenda in BBC's dramatic comedy series Microsoap. She also featured in her first episode of BBC's medical drama Doctors in the series one episode "A Woman's Right to Choose".

Children's series The Queen's Nose, originally broadcast on CBBC, saw Badland in the role of Mrs Dooley in series four and five (2000/2001). She went on to star in the made-for-TV film The Gentleman Thief and feature in Hallmark's two-part-mini series The Lost Empire (aka The Monkey King). Her next television role, in 2002, was a guest spot on BBC's family drama Born and Bred. Badland followed this appearance with two made for television movies. First was The Mayor of Casterbridge, an adaptation of Thomas Hardy's novel, and the second was Indian Dream for BBC Two. Between 2002 and 2005, Badland co-starred in BBC's Cutting It, a drama series set in a Manchester, England hair salon. Badland was once again showcased in an Agatha Christie's adaptation in 2003, this time portraying Mrs Spriggs in the episode "Five Little Pigs" in the series nine premiere of ITV's Poirot. Following that role, she featured in her second episode of BBC's Doctors in the series six episode "An Inspector Called". 2005 saw Badland featured in a variety of television mediums. She began the year by portraying Einstein's nurse in an episode of BBC Two's documentary series Horizon entitled "Einstein's Unfinished Symphony". From there she returned to serialised television in a four-episode stint on long-running soap opera Coronation Street, a two-episode guest-starring role on BBC's court drama Judge John Deed, and an episode of BBC Three's dark comedy Twisted Tales. In a crossover episode of medical dramas Holby City and Casualty, where fans decided the fate of certain characters, Badland guest-starred as Wendy Wincott. She also portrayed the recurring villain Blon Fel-Fotch Pasameer-Day Slitheen a.k.a. "Margaret Blaine" in the 2005 series of Doctor Who and provided commentary on the Doctor Who Complete Series One Box Set for the episodes "World War Three" and "Boom Town".

Portraying Angela Robbins, a disturbed inmate who suffered from Dissociative Identity Disorder, Badland appeared at Larkhall Prison in 2006 in an episode of the eighth series of ITV One's drama Bad Girls. The next year she starred in Hat Trick Productions' made for TV Film Miss Mary Lloyd and featured in her third role on BBC's Doctors in the series nine episode entitled "Background Noise". Badland then featured in the series two premier of ITV's comedy Kingdom (2008), opposite Stephen Fry, Channel 4's Coming Up, opposite Imelda Staunton, and made-for-TV film Summerhill. She also portrayed the sharply conservative Ethel Tonks in BBC's All the Small Things (April/May 2009) alongside Sarah Lancashire, Neil Pearson, Sarah Alexander and Bryan Dick. BBC Three's mini-series Personal Affairs, a candid look at office life among up and coming women, featured Badland as Mahiri Crawford, and the made-for-TV film Whatever It Takes saw her portray the role of Connie. Then, in a third appearance on BBC's medical drama Casualty, she guest-starred in the series twenty-four episode entitled "Every Breath you Take" (2009).

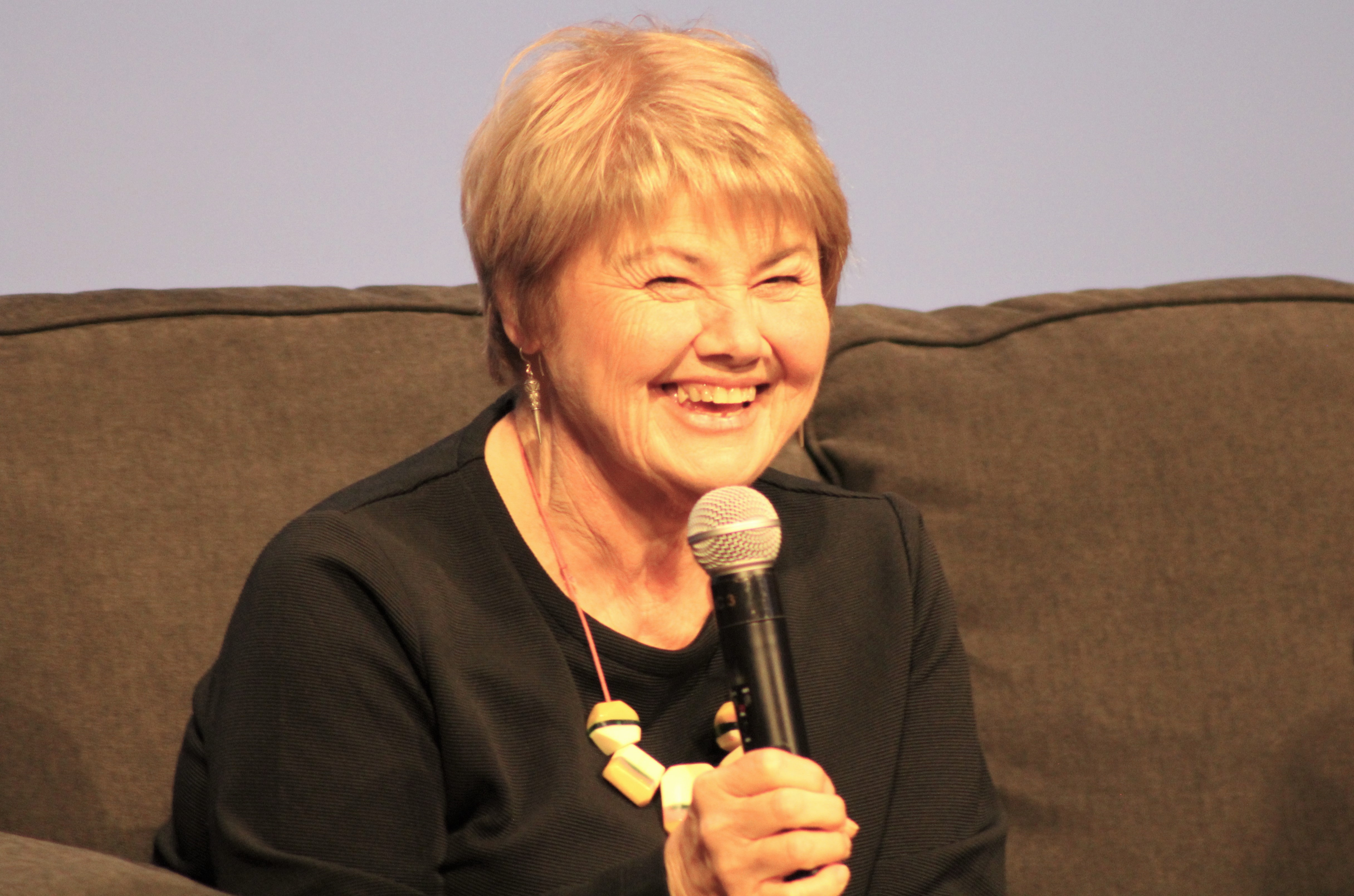
Annette Badland answering questions during a group panel at the Sasnak City Outlander convention on 17 November 2018.

In 2010 Badland featured in her fourth stint on BBC's Doctors in the series twelve episode "Love Thy Neighbour" and the pilot episode of Sky One's Little Crackers, a series of autobiographical shorts written by and starring some of Britain's top comedians. The next year she featured in an episode of BBC's WWII drama Land Girls, which focused on the lives of several women in Britain's Women's Land Army, a second episode of Little Crackers based upon Sheridan Smith's life experiences, and an episode of BBC Two's documentary series The Faces of... focusing on the career of Michael Caine. From 2011 to 2015 on The Sparticle Mystery, Badland appeared in four episodes as DoomsDay Dora and eight episodes as HoloDora. 2012 saw her appear in several episodic series, including Channel 4's cult-hit Skins, her fifth and final episode of BBC's Doctors, and her fourth and final episode of BBC's Casualty. Badland also appeared as Ursula, from 2012 to 2014, in the CBBC science fiction series, Wizards vs Aliens.

Award-winning web series 3some featured Badland as one of the main character's mother in 2013. She went on to star in an episode of Sky One's Playhouse Presents entitled "Snodgrass", which imagined what would have happened if John Lennon had left The Beatles prior to becoming famous. She rounded out 2013 by featuring in an episode of comedy series You, Me & Them and several episodes of Channel 4's sitcom Man Down. On 12 December 2013, it was announced that Badland would appear as a regular in the BBC soap opera, EastEnders, playing Babe Smith. She made her first on-screen appearance in the episode broadcast on 31 January 2014. In 2016 it was announced, by new executive producer Sean O'Connor, that Badland's character would be leaving the serial and making her final appearance on 9 February 2017.

Beginning in 2014, Badland portrayed the featured recurring role of Mrs Fitzgibbons in Starz's television adaptation of Diana Gabaldon's best selling Scottish time travel novel Outlander. That same year she featured in an episode of BBC's mystery series Father Brown "The Daughters of Jerusalem" as Judith Bunyon, before a turn as her EastEnders character Aunt Babe in the made for TV Film Neighbours 30th Anniversary Tribute: Ramsey Square.

In May 2018, Badland reached the final of BBC's charity series Pointless with actor Neil Dudgeon, eventually donating £500 to the Midland Langar Seva Society. 2018 also saw Badland in several episodic television roles such as BBC One's sitcom Not Going Out, ITV Two's Roman sitcom Plebs, CBBC's children's series The Dumping Ground, BBC One's comedy Hold the Sunset, and Sky One's mystery series Agatha Raisin. "The Fairies of Fryfam" as Betty Jackson. In 2019 she guest-starred on BBC's dramatic daytime comedy Shakespeare & Hathaway: Private Investigators "Nothing Will Come of Nothing" as Ms Rose King. Beginning in series twenty (2019) of ITV's long-running crime drama Midsomer Murders, she has portrayed Dr Fleur Perkins, Midsomer's resident pathologist.

=== Film ===
Badland's first film role was Terry Gilliam's 1977 film Jabberwocky, based upon Lewis Carroll's epic poem, alongside Michael Palin and Harry H. Corbett. She would not return to film again until 1986's independent feature Knights & Emeralds, which explored the consequences of a white drummer joining a mostly black marching band. From there she landed roles in director Jonnie Turpie's film Out of Order (1987) and director Chris Newby's Anchoress.

Writer John Brosnan's horror film Beyond Bedlam (1994) and director Angela Pope's drama Captives, which focused on a prison dentist's illicit affair with an inmate, both featured Badland in 1994. Her next film was director Paul Unwin's Oscar nominated short Syrup. She went on to Xingu Film's comedyThe Grotesque (1995, aka Gentlemen Don't Eat Poets), director Philip Haas's drama Angels & Insects, director Angela Pope's drama Hollow Reed, and director Shane Meadows sports drama Twenty Four Seven. In 1998, Badland co-starred in the SAG nominated drama Little Voice (1998) as the friend of Little Voice's mother Mari (Brenda Blethyn). The next year she starred in director Rachel Mathews's short film Mrs Buchan, a black comedy exploring religious conviction, director Mark Greenstreet's romantic comedy Caught In the Act, and Tall Stories' dramatic comedy Beautiful People, which centres on the conflict between two Bosnian refugees in London.

2000 saw Badland in two feature films, the first was director David A Stewart's drama Honest, a black comedy set in London of the late 1960s alongside Peter Facinelli, and the second was Focus Films' Secret Society, a comedy where several women working factory jobs by day are secretly sumo wrestling by night. Between 2001 and 2004, Badlland had roles in the comedy Redemption Road, dramatic comedy Club Le Monde, dramatic comedy Mrs Caldicot's Cabbage War, director Joe Perino's A Village Tale, director Sonja Phillips's directing debut The Knickerman, and Caspian Productions' short film The Tale of Tarquin Slant. In 2005, Badland lent her voice to the Walt Disney's animated feature Valiant, about a WWI carrier pigeon who joins the Royal Homing Pigeon Corps, alongside Ewan McGregor and Tim Curry. She went on to feature in Tim Burton's fill-length film Charlie and the Chocolate Factory (2005), thriller The Kovak Box (2006), and the drama Almost Adult (2006).

The Baker, a comedy from director Gareth Lewis about a hit man seeking refuge from his career, saw Badland feature as Martha Edwards early in 2007. From there she went on to star in director Nic Cornwall's short film Mr Thornton's Change of Heart, feature in the comedy Three and Out opposite Colm Meaney, and appear in the thriller Legacy: Black Ops opposite Idris Elba. In 2009, Badland signed on for a role in Jam, the first short film from three eighteen year old filmmakers, which was financed through crowdfunding after attracting the attention of the public and celebrities. Continuing with short films, she starred in the Oscar nominated Wish 143, the story of a young man trying to live life before succumbing to cancer, from director Ian Barnes. 2012 saw Badland featured in Mother's Milk, a drama based upon Edward St. Aubyn's novel of the same name, before returning to short films for 2013's The Girl In A Bubble and 2014's A Quiet Courage.

In 2017, Badland featured in two separate biopics. The first was the biographical drama A Quiet Passion, directed by Terence Davies and starring Cynthia Nixon, which chronicled the life of poet Emily Dickinson. Second was the biographical dramatic comedy The Man Who Invented Christmas, directed by Baharat Nalluri and starring Dan Stevens, which explored author Charles Dickens's journey to overcome writer's block and produce the novella A Christmas Carol. In 2018, Badland starred in writer/director Callum Crawford's debut film, Degenerates, a film which centres on a writer who, unable to sell his screenplay ideas, sets out to create his own.

=== Radio ===
Badland began her radio career in 1992 with a role in David Halliwell's comedy Little Malcolm and His Struggle Against the Eunuchs for BBC Radio 3. In 1994, she was cast as the lead role of DI Gwen Danbury on BBC Radio 4 Extra's crime drama An Odd Body, a role she would portray for three series. From 2000 to 2003, Badland was a regular on BBC Radio 4 Extra's comedy Smelling of Roses before being cast in the six-part BBC Radio 4 radio drama Rolling Home, which centred on a group of people living in caravans (aka mobile homes/campers). In 2004, Badland starred in BBC Radio 4's play The Pool, which focuses on a Londoner's adventures while stuck in Liverpool for the day, opposite Peter Wright, The Diary of a Nobody opposite Stephen Tompkinson, and Bumps and Bruises, which focuses on an unqualified woman attempting to run an antenatal (prenatal) class opposite Penelope Wilton. Richard Monk's Church, broadcast in February 2005 and starring Badland alongside Andrew Garfield, tells the story of sex and religion through the eyes of two different men. She then took over the role of Hazel Woolley, the "bad seed" adopted daughter of Jack Woolley in the long-running radio soap opera The Archers, featured in the radio adaptation of an adaptation of George MacDonald's children's novel At the Back of the North Wind, and starred as Mrs Yeobright in BBC Radio 4 Extra's adaptation of Thomas Hardy's The Return of the Native.

In 2006 Badland starred in BBC Radio 4's River's Up alongside Peter Corey. The next year she featured in Jonathan Myerson's six-part radio dramatisation of Boris Pasternak's epic story Dr Zhivago. From there, Badland featured as Tilly Carbury in BBC Radio 4's 15 Minute Drama The Way We Live Right Now (2008), an adaptation of Anthony Trollope's satirical novel, and served as a narrator for Heather Couper's Cosmic Quest, an educational history of astronomy. Yerma, a poetic play touching on the themes of love, infertility, and isolation by Spanish author Federico García Lorca, saw Badland star alongside Emma Cunniffe and Concrad Nelson in 2010 on BBC Radio 3. That same year, she appeared in several episodes of BBC Radio 4's Poetry Please, where poems of various themes are chosen by listeners, and Chris Wilson's play Lump-Boy Logan, which focused on a boy with acne, for BBC Radio 3. BBC Radio 4 Extra's show Poetry Extra featured Badland in an episode showcasing the work of poet Molly Holden later that year. She later guest-starred in an episode of Sebastian Baczkiewicz's dark fantasy-adventure radio programme Pilgrim (2013), a series of tales that followed the adventures of main character and immortal being William Palmer. In the two-part radio serial The Aeneid (2013), writer Hattie Naylor's adaptation of the epic poem by Virgil, saw Badland in the role of Roman Goddess Venus on BBC Radio 4. Doing Time: The Last Ballad of Reading Gaol, based upon the poem by Oscar Wilde and showcasing odd historical facts from the prison's records, featured Badland in 2014. She went on to perform as a reader for series one, episode five of Jenny Eclair's short story vignette series Little Lifetimes in an episode entitled "The Viewing". The next year, she scored the lead role of Mrs Pickwick, a commissioner for local government, in director Jeremy Mortimer's drama Mrs Pickwick's Papers on BBC Radio 4. It was announced in 2018 that Badland would reprise her role as Doctor Who's Margaret Blaine in the spin-off radio series Torchwood. The episode, entitled "Sync", was released in May 2019.

== Filmography ==
=== Theatre ===
Year	Title	Role	Director	Theatre
1970	Private Lives	Maid		Southwold Summer Theatre
1972	Three Arrows	Page/Soldier	Noel Willman	Cambridge Arts Theatre
1972	Ruling the Roost	Guest	Richard Cottrell	Cambridge Arts Theatre
1973	As You Like It	Audrey	Buzz Goodbody	Royal Shakespeare Theatre
1973	Love's Labour's Lost	various	David Jones	RST
1973	Romeo and Juliet	woman	Terry Hands	RST
1973	The Taming of the Shrew	Hostess	Clifford Williams	RST
1992	The Rise and Fall of Little Voice	Neighbour	Sam Mendes	Aldwych Theatre
1994	Slavs!	Mrs Domik	Tony Kushner	Hampstead Theatre
1998	The Prime of Miss Jean Brodie	Miss Mackay	Phyllida Lloyd	Royal National Theatre
1999	'Tis Pity She's a Whore	Putana	David Lan	Young Vic Theatre
2002	Doctor Faustus	Duchess of Anholt	David Lan	Young Vic Theatre
2006	Measure for Measure	Mistress Overdone	Peter Hall	Theatre Royal
2006	Habeas Corpus	Mrs Wicksteed	Peter Hall	Theatre Royal
2007	The Vortex	Clara Hibbert	Peter Hall	Apollo Theatre
2009	The Golden Hour	Leslie	Femi Elufowoju Jr.	Almedia Theatre
2009	Alphabetical Order	Nora	Christopher Luscombe	Hampstead Theatre
2009	Blithe Spirit	Madame Arcati	Sarah Frankcom	Royal Exchange Theatre
2010	Kin	Mrs B	Jeremy Herrin	Royal Court Theatre
2010	Far Away	Harper	Simon Godwin	Bristol Old Vic Theatre
2018	The Winter's Tale	Old Shepherd	Blanche McIntyre	Shakespeare's Globe
2018	Eyam	Reverend Stanley	Adele Thomas	Shakespeare's Globe
2019	Edward II	Mortimer	Nick Bagnall	Sam Wanamaker Playhouse
2019	After Edward	Gertrude Stein	Brendan O'Hara	Sam Wanamaker Playhouse
2020	Our Lady of Blundellsands	Garnet	Nick Bagnall	Everyman, Liverpool
2025	Escaped Alone/What If If Only	Vi/Future	Sarah Frankcom	Royal Exchange, Manchester

=== Television ===
Year	Title	Character	Production	Notes
1975	The Naked Civil Servant	Tap Dancing Pupil	BBC	TV film
1978	The Devil's Crown	Young Nun	BBC Two	Appeared in: Season 1, Ep. 10 "In Sun's Eclipse"
1978	Spearhead	Mrs Yates	ITV	Appeared in: Series 1, Ep. 6 "Thieves In the Night"
1978	Crossroads	Waitress	ATV	Appeared in: Series 1, Ep. 3001–3002
1979	Flat Bust	Rhoda	YTV	TV film
1980	Shoestring	Girl in Bureau	BBC One	Appeared in: Series 2, Ep. 7 "Looking for Mr Wright"
1980	The Dick Emery Hour	1st Lady at Park Bench	Thames Television	TV special
1981–1984	Bergerac	Charlotte	BBC	Appeared in: Series 1–3
1981	Bognor	Sharon	Thames Television	Appeared in: Series 1, Ep. 9–12
1981	Great Expectations	Flopson	BBC	Appeared in Series 1, Ep. 5 "
1981	The Last Song	Mrs Healey	BBC Two	Appeared in Series 1, Ep. 1, 6
1982	The Gentle Touch	Assistant	ITV	Appeared in: Series 3, Ep. 13
1982	Nanny	Nurse	BBC	Appeared in: Series 2, Ep. 6 "Crossing the Line"
1982	Minder	Nurse	Thames Television	Appeared in: Series 3, Ep. 13 "In"
1983	Pictures	Vera	PBS	Appeared in: Series 1, Ep. 1–3, 6–7
1983	The Old Men At The Zoo	Catherine Langley-Beard	BBC Two	Appeared in: Series 1, Ep. 4 "Armageddon"
1984	Lace	Piggy Fassbinder	ABC/ITV	TV Mini-Series
1984	Last Day of Summer	Jenny	Channel 4	TV film
1985	Miss Marple: A Pocket Full of Rye	Gladys Martin	BBC Two	TV Mini-Series
1985	Newstime	Doreen	BBC	TV film
1985	Sacred Hearts	Sister Mercy	Channel 4	TV film
1985	Dramarama	Dim	ITV	Appeared in: Series 3, Ep. 4 "The Young Person's Guide to Going Backwards in the World "
1985	Lace II	Piggy Fassbinder	ABC/ITV	TV film
1985–1986	Troubles and Strife	Christine	ITV	Appeared in: Series 1–2
1987	A Little Princess	Cook	PBS	TV Mini-Series
1987	You Must Be the Husband	Nurse	BBC	Appeared in: Series 1, Ep. 4 "Mummy's Brave Little Soldier"
1988	Hale & Pace	Various	ITV/Channel 4	Appeared in: Series 1, Ep. 3, 5
1989	Screenplay	Connie	ITV	Appeared in: Series 4, Ep. 5 "Chinese Whispers"
1989	All Creatures Great and Small	Sybil Darnley	BBC	Appeared in" Series 6, Ep. 11 "The Rough and the Smooth"
1989	The Pied Piper	French woman on bus	CBS	TV film
1989–1990	Happy Families	Various	BBC One	Appeared in: Series 1–2
1990–2012, 2024	Casualty	Jodie Forbes/Angela Mason/Jenny Chinton/Maggie Young/Shirley Balwin	BBC	Appeared in: Series 5, Ep. 11; Series 8, Ep. 8; Series 24, Ep. 10; Series 27, Ep. 13. A History of Violence: Charlie.
1991	Making Out	Willow	BBC	Appeared in: Series 3, Ep. 2–3, 6, 8
1991–1999	The Bill	Stella King/Pearl Armfield/Angie Barker/Penny Rowan	ITV	Appeared in: Series 7, Ep. 103; Series 11, Ep. 120; Series 14, Ep. 109; Series 15, Ep. 63
1991–1993	2point4 Children	Dawn	BBC	Appeared in: Series 1, Ep. 6; Series 3, Ep. 5
1992	Archer's Goon	Shine	BBC One	Appeared in: Series 1, Ep. 4–6
1993	The Mushroom Picker	Tonya	BBC	TV Mini-Series; Appeared in Ep. 1
1993	Goggle Eyes	Beth	BBC	TV Mini-Series; Appeared in Ep. 3
1993–1995	Inside Victor Lewis-Smith	Nurse	BBC	Appeared in: Series 1–2
1994	Smokescreen	Big Smithy	BBC	TV Mini-Series
1994	Love Hurts	Thalia Thomas	BBC	Appeared in: Series 3, Ep. 3 "The Parent trap"
1994	Frank Stubbs Promotes	Ailsa	ITV	Appeared in: Series 2, Ep. 3 "Babies"
1994	Blue Heaven	Ms. Emmett	Channel 4	Appeared in: Series 1, Ep. 2
1995	Mike & Angelo	Miss Bliss	ITV	Appeared in: Series 7, Ep. 1 "
1995	Jackanory	Storyteller/Herself	BBC	Appeared in: Dimanche Diller: Part 1-3
1995	Fist of Fun	Pizza restaurant Employee	BBC	Appeared in: Series 1, Ep. 4
1995–1996	Black Hearts in Battersea	Dolly Buckle	BBC	Appeared in: Series 1
1996	Outside Edge	Rosie	ITV	Appeared in: Series 3, Ep. 3 "The First Match"
1996	Gulliver's Travels	Farmer Grultrud's Wife	NBC	TV Mini-Series; Appeared in Ep. 1
1996	The Demon Headmaster	Postmistress	BBC	Appeared in: Series 2, Ep. 1–2
1996	Cuts	Gill Formcasting		TV film
1997	Ain't Misbehavin'	Anna	ITV	Appeared in: Series 1, Ep. 2
1997	Holding On	Brenda	BBC	TV Mini-Series: Appeared in Ep. 5–8
1997–1998	Mr Wymi	Matron / Primrose	BBC One	Appeared in: Series 1; Series 2, Ep. 1
1998–1999	The Worst Witch	Mrs Tapioca	ITV	Appeared in: Series 1, Ep. 2,9; Series 2, Ep. 6
1999	Holby City	Eleri	BBC	Appeared in: Series 2, Ep. 1 "Search for the Hero"
1999	A Christmas Carol	Mrs Fezziwig	TNT	TV film
1999	Oliver Twist	Chertsey Cook	ITV	TV Mini-Series: Appeared in Ep. 4
1999–2000	Microsoap	Aunt Glenda	BBC	Appeared in: Series 2, Ep.5; Series 4, Ep. 1, 5
2000–2012	Doctors	Judy Brownlow/Sharon Maberly /Sarah Hardy/Angela Lombard/ Denise Forster	BBC	Appeared in: Series 1, Ep. 34; Series 6, Ep. 24; Series 9, Ep. 125; Series 12, Ep. 49; Series 14, Ep. 57
2000–2001	The Queen's Nose	Mrs Dooley	CBBC	Appeared in Series 1–2
2000	The Gentleman Thief	Mrs Pinkton	BBC	TV film
2001	The Lost Empire (aka The Monkey King)	Confusion's 4th Wife	Hallmark	TV Mini-Series
2002	Born and Bred	Edna Pendleton	BBC	Appeared in: Series 1, Ep. 1 "The Best Man"
2002–2005	Cutting It	Brawdie Henshall	BBC	Appeared in: Series 1–4
2003	The Mayor of Casterbridge	Mrs Stannidge	ITV	TV film
2003	Indian Dream	Pat	BBC Two	TV film
2003	Poirot	Mrs Spriggs	ITV	Appeared in Series 9, Ep. 1 "Five Little Pigs"
2005	Horizon	The Nurse	BBC Two	Appeared in: Series 41, Ep. 10 "Einstein's Unfinished Symphony"
2005	Coronation Street	Thelma Clegg	ITV	Appeared in: Series 1, Ep. 5940, 5941, 5943, 5945
2005	Judge John Deed	Bette Kidman MP	BBC	Appeared in: Series 4, Ep. 4, 6
2005	Twisted Tales	Bunty Crow	BBC Manchester	Appeared in: Series 1, Ep. 14 "Fruitcake of the Living Dead "
2005	Casanova	Pauline	BBC Three	TV Mini-Series: Appeared in Ep. 3
2005	Doctor Who	Margaret Blaine/Blon Fel-Fotch Passameer-Day Slitheen	BBC	Appeared in: Series 1, Ep. 4–5, 11
2005	Casualty@Holby City	Wendy Wincott	BBC	Audience interactive Crossover Episode
2006	Bad Girls	Angela Robbins	ITV	Appeared in: Series 8, Ep. 3
2007	Director's Debut	Sheena Keavey	BBC	Appeared in: Series 1, Ep. 2 "Baby Boom"
2007	Miss Marie Lloyd	Nelly Powers	BBC	TV film
2008	Kingdom	Dolly Tucker	ITV	Appeared in: Series 2, Ep 1
2008	Coming Up	Bowls Lady	Channel 4	Appeared in: Series 6, Ep. 4 "Lickle Bill Um"
2008	Summerhill	Myrtle	BBC	TV Mini-Series
2009	All the Small Things	Ethel Tonks	BBC	Appeared in: Series 1
2009	Personal Affairs	Mairhi Crawford	BBC Three	TV Mini-Series: Appeared in Ep. 2
2009	Whatever It Takes	Connie	ITV	TV film
2010/2011	Little Crackers	Mrs Ramsbottom/Mrs Chitterling	Sky One	Appeared in: Series 1, Ep. 5; Series 2, Ep. 8
2011	Land Girls	Miss Timpson	BBC	Appeared in: Series 3, Ep. 2 "The War in the Fields"
2011	The Faces of...	Herself	BBC Two	Appeared in: Series 1, Ep. 3 "Michael Caine"
2011–2015	The Sparticle Mystery	Holodora / Doomsday Dora	CBBC	Appeared in: Series 1, Ep. 3–5, 13; Series 2, Ep. 10; Series 3, Ep. 4, 7–13
2012	Skins	Mavis	E4	Appeared in: Series 6, Ep. 10 "Finale"
2012–2014	Wizards vs Aliens	Ursula Crowe	CBBC	Appeared in: Series 1–3
2013	3some	Margaret	Blip TV	Appeared in: Series 1, Ep. 3, 4
2013	Playhouse Presents	Woman in Office	Sky One	Appeared in: Series 2, Ep. 2 "Snodgrass"
2013	Aunties	Mavis	(Pilot)	TV film
2013	You, Me & Them	Karen	Gold	Appeared in: Series 1, Ep. 4 "The Funeral"
2013	Man Down	Mrs Wigmore	Channel 4	Appeared in: Series 1, Ep. 2, 5; Series 2, Ep. 3
2014	Father Brown	Judith Bunyon	BBC	Appeared in: Series 2, Ep. 6 "The Daughters of Jerusalem"
2014–2017	EastEnders	Babe Smith	BBC	Regular role; 219 episodes
2014–2015	Outlander	Mrs Fitzgibbons	Starz	Appeared in: Series 1
2018	Pointless Celebrity	Herself	BBC One	Appeared in: Series 11 "Theatre Actors"
2018	Not Going Out	Linda	BBC One	Appeared in: Series 9 Episode 4 "Pets"
2018	Plebs	Athena	ITV Two	Appeared in: Series 4, Ep. 2 "The Critic"
2018	The Dumping Ground	Mavis	CBBC	Appeared in: Series 6, Ep. 15 "Bird's Song"
2018	Hold the Sunset	Celia	BBC One	Appeared in: Series 1, Ep. 7 "If I Were a Wise Man"
2018	Agatha Raisin	Betty Jackson	Sky One	Appeared in: Series 2, Ep. 2 "The Fairies of Fryfam"
2019	Shakespeare & Hathaway: Private Investigators	Ms Rose King	BBC	Appeared in: Series 2, Ep. 7 "Nothing Will Come of Nothing"
2019–present	Midsomer Murders	Fleur Perkins	ITV	Series 20–present
2020	Doctors	Mrs Zielinski	BBC	Episode: "A Day in the Life..."
2020	Criminal: UK	Donna Swift	Netflix	Episode: "Sandeep"
2020	Cormoran Strike Lethal White	Minicab driver	BBC One	Episode 4
2020	The Crown	Dr Margaret Meagarty	Netflix	Guest role; Season 4
2020–2023, 2026	Ted Lasso	Mae Green	Apple TV+	Season 1 - Season 4
2021	Silent Witness	Linda Fletcher	BBC	Series 24 Episode 5
2021	Whitstable Pearl	Rosie	Acorn TV	Series 1 Episode 5
2022	Inside No. 9	Winnie	BBC Two	Season 7 Episode 2: "Mr King"
2022–2025	Big Boys	Nanny Bingo	Channel 4	Recurring role
2023	Beyond Paradise	Isla Jay	BBC	Series 1 Episode 3
2023	Brassic	Rhoda Dennings	Sky	Series 5 Episode 6: "Caravan of Courage"
2024
2024	DI Ray	Liz	ITV	Season 2 Episode 1
2024	Heartstopper	Ivy Olsson	Netflix	Season 3
2024	Murder, They Hope	Margaret	BBC	Apocalypse Slough: A Murder They Hope Mystery
2026	Run Away	Lou	Netflix	Miniseries
2026	Black Ops	Cynthia	BBC	Series 2 Episode 6

=== Film ===
Year	Title	Character	Notes
1977	Jabberwocky	Griselda Fishfinger	
1986	Knights & Emeralds	Daisy	Independent Film
1987	Out of Order	Operator	
1993	Anchoress	Mary	
1994	Beyond Bedlam	Nurse Wrekin	
1994	Captives	Maggie	
1994	Syrup	Linda	Short Film
1995	The Grotesque	Connie Babblehump	aka Gentlemen Don't Eat Poets
1995	Angels & Insects	Lady Alabaster	
1996	Hollow Reed	Martyn's barrister	
1997	TwentyFourSeven	Tim's Mother	
1998	Little Voice	Sadie	
1999	Mrs Buchan	Mrs Buchan	Short Film
1999	Caught In the Act	Katherine	
1999	Beautiful People	Psychologist	
2000	Honest	Rose	
2000	Secret Society	Marlene	
2001	Redemption Road	Brown Owl	
2002	Club Le Monde	Stella	
2002	Mrs Caldicot's Cabbage War	Cook	
2002	A Village Tale	Lily	
2004	The Knickerman	Mrs Harris	Short Film
2004	The Tale of Tarquin Slant	Cook	Short Film
2005	Valiant	Elsa	Animated - Voice Work
2005	Charlie and the Chocolate Factory	Jolly Woman	
2006	The Kovak Box	Kathy	
2006	Almost Adult		
2007	The Baker	Martha Edwards	
2007	Mr Thornton's Change of Heart	Mary	Short Film
2008	Three and Out	Maureen	
2008	Summerhill	Myrtle	also shown as a miniseries
2009	Jam	Mrs Desirandelle	Short Film
2009	Wish 143	Carol	
2011	Legacy: Black Ops	Stephanie Gumpel	
2012	Mother's Milk	Margaret	
2013	The Girl In A Bubble	Margary	Short Film
2014	A Quiet Courage	Margaret	Short Film
2016	A Quiet Passion	Aunt Elizabeth	
2017	The Man Who Invented Christmas	Butcher's Wife/Mrs Fezziwig	
2018	Degenerates	Maureen Costello	
2018	The Winter's Tale	Old Shepherd	Stage play that was broadcast in theatres.
2023	Operation Napoleon	Sarah Steinkamp	
2023	The Toxic Avenger	Daisy	
2026	Flavia	TBA	Completed

=== Radio ===
Year	Title	Character	Production	Director
1992	Little Malcolm and His Struggle Against the Eunuchs	Anne	BBC Radio 3	Philip Martin
1994	An Odd Body	DI Gwen Danbury	BBC Radio 4 Extra	Glyn Dearman
2000–2003	Smelling of Roses	Tess	BBC Radio 4 Extra	Various
2001	Rolling Home	Beveriey	BBC Radio 4 Extra	Richard Monks
2004	The Pool		BBC Radio 4	Mary Peate
2004	The Diary of a Nobody	Mrs Pooter	BBC Radio 4	Jenny Stephens
2004	Bumps and Bruises	Celia	BBC Radio 4	Nigel Bryant
2005	Church		BBC Radio 4	Richard Monks
2005	The Archers	Hazel Woolley	BBC Radio 4	Multiple
2005	At the Back of the North Wind	Martha	BBC Radio 4	Norman Stone
2005	The Return of the Native	Mrs Yeobright	BBC Radio 4 Extra	Rosemary Watts
2006	River's Up		BBC Radio 4 Extra	Alex Jones
2007	Dr Zhivago	Amalia	BBC Radio 4	Jonathan Myerson
2008	15 Minute Drama	Tilly Carbury	BBC Radio 4	Jonquil Panting
2008	Cosmic Quest	Narrator	BBC Radio 4	Martin Redfern (Producer)
2010	Yerma	Pagan Old Woman	BBC Radio 3	Pauline Harris
2010	Poetry Please	Herself/narrator	BBC Radio 4	Sarah Langan (Producer)
2010	Lump-Boy Logan	Auntie Jeanette	BBC Radio 3	Pauline Harris
2010	Poetry Extra	Herself/narrator	BBC Radio 4 Extra	Christine Hall (Producer)
2013	Pilgrim	Colville	BBC Radio 4 Extra	Marc Beeby
2013	The Aeneid	Venus	BBC Radio 4	Kate McAll
2014	Doing Time: The Last Ballad of Reading Gaol	The Visitor	BBC Radio Berkshire	Duncan McLarty
2014	Little Lifetimes	Reader	BBC Radio 4	Sally Avens (Producer)
2015	Mrs Pickwick's Papers	Mrs Pickwick	BBC Radio 4	Jeremy Mortimer
2019	Torchwood	Margaret Blaine	Big Finish	Scott Handcock

== Awards and nominations ==
Year	Award	Category	Nominated work	Result	Ref
1993	Laurence Olivier Awards	Best Actress in a Supporting Role	The Rise and Fall of Little Voice	Nominated	
1999	Screen Actors Guild Awards	Outstanding Performance by a Cast in a Motion Picture	Little Voice	Nominated	
2021	Screen Actors Guild Awards	Outstanding Performance by an Ensemble in a Comedy Series	Ted Lasso	Nominated	
2022	Screen Actors Guild Awards	Outstanding Performance by an Ensemble in a Comedy Series	Ted Lasso	Won	
2023	Screen Actors Guild Awards	Outstanding Performance by an Ensemble in a Comedy Series	Ted Lasso	Pending	
