= Colin McNaughton =

British poet, writer and illustrator of children's books

- Born: 18 May 1951 (age 75); Wallsend-upon-Tyne, Northumberland, England
- Occupations: Illustrator, writer, graphic designer
- Writing career
- Period: 1976–present
- Genre: Children's picture books

Colin McNaughton (born 18 May 1951) is a British writer and illustrator of over seventy children's books. He is also a poet, focusing mainly on humorous children's poetry. He trained in graphic design at the Central School of Art and Design in London followed by an MA in illustration at the Royal College of Art. He lives in London.

== Childhood ==
McNaughton was born in Wallsend, Northumberland in 1951, the son of a shipyard worker and a school dinner lady. As a child, there was little indication that he would become one of Britain's leading creators of children's picture books. There were no books at all in the family home, but there were always comics, his formative literature, and their slapstick humour has been a lasting influence.

== Books ==
McNaughton's first book was published while he was still at the RCA.

His exuberant picture books with their comic-strip techniques, often take the form of an extended joke:

When I was little, adults were always telling me to `Stop Being Silly' and to `Stop Messing About'. It took me far, far, too many years to realize that these were the only two things in life that I was any good at. Now, it's what I do all day. It's how I write my books: I get an idea and I mess about with it. I do silly things with it. I play with it.

McNaughton's books include the Preston Pig series: Suddenly!, Boo!, Oops!, Goal!, Hmm... and Shh (Don't Tell Mister Wolf!) all of which feature Preston Pig and his near escapes from Mr Wolf. A television series was developed from these books by Link Entertainment (which would later become part of the now-defunct Entertainment Rights) for CITV.

His most notable book is perhaps There's an Awful Lot of Weirdos in Our Neighbourhood, a collection of poetry written in conjunction with Allan Ahlberg, and which was published in 1989. Colin McNaughton has worked with Allan Ahlberg on a number of books, including three of the Happy Families series, Mr and Mrs Hay the Horse, Miss Brick the Builders' Baby and Mrs Jolly's Joke Shop.

McNaughton worked with illustrator Satoshi Kitamura to create Once Upon an Ordinary School Day, published in 2004.

I suppose what I'm striving for these days, in my books, is to do more with less. I'm looking for that kind of quality that the classic, two minute, pop song has; it's great when you first hear it and it's still great thirty years later. It's a lovely contradiction; it's of the moment but it's also timeless. That's what I'm after

== List (incomplete) of published books ==
- 1 2 3 And Things; Author: Colin McNaughton; Publisher: Ernest Benn Ltd
- A B C And Things; Author: Colin McNaughton; Publisher: Ernest Benn Ltd
- Dracula's Tomb; Author: Colin McNaughton; Publisher: Candlewick
- Not Last Night But the Night Before; Author: Colin McNaughton; Illustrator: Emma Chichester Clark; Publisher: Walker Books Ltd
- Soccer Crazy; Author: Colin McNaughton; Publisher: Mathew Price Ltd.
- We're Off to Look for Aliens; Author: Colin McNaughton; Illustrator: Colin McNaughton; Publisher: Candlewick
- Here Come the Aliens!; Author: Colin McNaughton; Publisher: Walker Books Ltd
- Captain Abdul's Little Treasure; Author: Colin McNaughton; Publisher: Walker Books Ltd
- If Dinosaurs Were Cats and Dogs; Author: Colin McNaughton; Publisher: Mathew Price Ltd
- Potty Poo-poo Wee-wee!; Author: Colin McNaughton; Publisher: Walker Books Ltd
- Once Upon an Ordinary School Day; Author: Colin McNaughton; Illustrator: Satoshi Kitamura; Publisher: Farrar, Straus and Giroux (BYR)
- What Now, Cushie Butterfield; Author: Colin McNaughton; Publisher: HarperCollins Publishers Limited
- Lemmy Was a Diver; Author: Colin McNaughton; Publisher: ANDERSEN (RAND)
- Jolly Roger And The Pirates Of Captain Abdul; Author: Colin McNaughton; Illustrator: Colin McNaughton; Publisher: Tandem Library
- She's a Little Cow; Author: Colin McNaughton; Publisher: Collins
- S.W.A.L.K. (Preston Pig); Author: Colin McNaughton; Publisher: Picture Lions
- Who's Been Sleeping in My Porridge?; Author: Colin McNaughton; Publisher: Candlewick
- Wish You Were Here (and I Wasn't); Author: Colin McNaughton; Illustrator: Colin McNaughton; Publisher: Candlewick Press (MA)
- I'm Talking Big!; Author: Colin McNaughton; Publisher: Walker Books Ltd
- Good News, Bad News; Author: Colin McNaughton; Illustrator: Colin McNaughton; Publisher: Collins
- Oomph!: A Preston Pig Story; Author: Colin McNaughton; Publisher: Harcourt Children's Books
- Don't Step on the Crack!; Author: Colin McNaughton; Illustrator: Colin McNaughton; Publisher: Dial Books
- Little Goal!: A Preston Pig Toddler Book; Author: Colin McNaughton; Publisher: Red Wagon Books
- Little Oops!: A Preston Pig Toddler Book; Author: Colin McNaughton; Publisher: Red Wagon Books
- Little Boo!: A Preston Pig Toddler Book; Author: Colin McNaughton; Publisher: Red Wagon Books
- Little Suddenly!: A Preston Pig Toddler Book; Author: Colin McNaughton; Publisher: Red Wagon Books
- Mr and Mrs Hay the Horse; Author: Allan Ahlberg; Illustrator: Colin McNaughton; Publisher: Puffin Books
- Miss Brick the Builders' Baby; Author: Allan Ahlberg; Illustrator: Colin McNaughton; Publisher: Puffin Books
- Mrs Jolly's Joke Shop; Author: Allan Ahlberg; Illustrator: Colin McNaughton; Publisher: Puffin Books
- There's an Awful Lot of Weirdos in our Neighbourhood; Author: Colin McNaughton; Publisher: Walker Books Ltd

== Awards ==
McNaughton won the British Book Award, Design and Production in 1989 for Jolly Roger and in 1993 for Making Friends with Frankenstein. He won the Kurt Maschler Award, or "the Emil", in 1991 for Have You Seen Who's Just Moved in Next Door to Us? (Walker), which he wrote and illustrated. That award from Maschler Publications and Booktrust annually recognised one "work of imagination for children, in which text and illustration are integrated so that each enhances and balances the other."

He won the 1996 Nestlé Smarties Book Prize in category 0–5 years for Oops!.

Runners-up, etc.

- Jolly Roger — 1988 Smarties Prize; W H Smith Illustration Award; Kurt Maschler Award
- Watch Out for the Giant-Killers! — 1991 Earthworm Award
- Who's That Banging on the Ceiling — 1992 British Book Award, Design and Production
- Suddenly! — 1994 Smarties Prize
- Here Come the Aliens! — 1996 Sheffield Children's Book Award; 1996 Kate Greenaway Medal
