= Happy Family =

Happy Family, The Happy Family, or A Happy Family may refer to:

== Film ==
- Happy Family (1934 film) or The Merry Frinks, an American comedy directed by Alfred E. Green
- A Happy Family, a 1935 Krazy Kat animated short
- The Happy Family (1936 film), a British comedy directed by Maclean Rogers
- The Happy Family (1952 film), a British comedy directed by Muriel Box
- Happy Family (2002 film), a Hong Kong film directed by Herman Yau
- Happy Family (2006 film) or 'N Beetje Verliefd, a Dutch comedy film directed by Martin Koolhoven
- Happy Family (2010 film), an Italian film directed by Gabriele Salvatores
- Happy Family (2017 film) or Monster Family, a German-British animated film directed by Holger Tappe

== Music ==
- The Happy Family (band), a 1980s Scottish post-punk band
- Happy Family (Japanese band), a progressive rock band

== Television ==
- Happy Family (American TV series), a 2003–2004 sitcom
- Happy Family (Chinese TV series), a 2004 animated series
- Happy Family (Singaporean TV series), a 2010 drama
- Happy Family: Conditions Apply, a 2023 Indian family comedy drama series
- "Happy Family" (Law & Order: Criminal Intent), a 2003 episode

== Other uses ==
- Happy Family (food company), an American organic baby-food company
- Happy Family (group theory), the sporadic groups that are subquotients of the Monster group
- The Happy Family (painting), a 1668 painting by Jan Steen
- The Happy Family (play), a 1951 play by Michael Clayton Hutton
- "The Happy Family" (fairy tale), a story by Hans Christian Andersen

== See also ==
- Happy Families (disambiguation)
