= Happy Families (disambiguation) =

Happy families is a traditional card game.

Happy Families may also refer to

- Happy Families (books), a series of children's books
- Happy Families (1989 TV series), a British children's television series based on the series of books of the same title
- Happy Families (1985 TV series), a British television comedy series
- Happy Families (1993 TV series), a British television game show presented by Andrew O'Connor and Sarah Greene
- "Happy Families" (Doctors), a 2005 television episode
- "Happy Families" (Murder City), a 2004 television episode
- Happy Families (play), a play by John Godber
- Happy Families (album), a 1982 album by Blancmange
- Happy Families, a 1990 album by Maddy Prior and Rick Kemp
