= Happy Families (1989 TV series) =

British children's television series

- Starring: Tamsin Heatley; Richard Hope
- Country of origin: United Kingdom
- Original language: English
- No. of series: 2
- No. of episodes: 24 (12 stories)

Production
- Running time: 30 minutes

Original release
- Network: BBC One
- Release: 6 November 1989 – 18 December 1990

Happy Families is a British children's television series made in the late 1980s based on the Happy Families series of books by Janet and Allan Ahlberg. Happy Families ran for two series, 24 episodes in all (since each story was split over two episodes), and was shown on Children's BBC in 1989 and 1990.

== Synopsis ==
Each tale is about a family of characters – typically father, mother, son and daughter, but this varies.

The cast played several different characters throughout the series with many recurring roles for the main cast including Milton Johns, Annette Badland and Elizabeth Estensen.

== Cast ==
- Milton Johns – Mr Clarence Creep, Mr Ding, Mr Cross the Inspector, Mr Alphonso
- Annette Badland – Mrs Wobble the Waitress, Mrs Plug the Plumber, Mrs Lather
- Elizabeth Estensen – Mrs Clara Creep, Mrs Tick the Teacher, Miss Trump
- Richard Hope – Mr Tick, PC Arntby, Mr Bun, Mr Plug, Mr Harry Hay, Captain Salt, Mr. Cash, Mr. Jump
- Tamsin Heatley – Mrs Jump, Mrs Bop, Mrs Brick, Mrs Salt, Mrs Hay, Mrs Bun
- Martyn Ellis-Mr Biff, Mr Money, Blackbeard, Teddy the Chef, Sailor. Martyn also wrote original songs for the show.
- London Kim – Master Money, Master Salt, Teddy Tick
- Ben Thomas – Mr Wobble, Mr Brick, Mr Bop, Mr Toad, Mr Wallis the Warder

== Episodes ==
=== Series One (1989) ===
- "Mrs Wobble the Waitress" (6-7 November 1989)
- "Mr Tick the Teacher" (13-14 November 1989)
- "Mr Creep the Crook" (20-21 November 1989)
- "Master Bun the Baker's Boy" (27-28 November 1989)
- "Mrs Plug the Plumber" (4-5 December 1989)
- "Mr and Mrs Hay the Horse" (11-12 December 1989)

=== Series Two (1990) ===
- "Mrs Lather's Laundry" (12-13 November 1990)
- "Master Salt the Sailors' Son" (19-20 November 1990)
- "Miss Brick the Builders' Baby" (26-27 November 1990)
- "Master Money the Millionaire" (3-4 December 1990)
- "Mr Biff the Boxer" (10-11 December 1990)
- "Miss Jump the Jockey" (17-18 December 1990)
