= Preston Pig =

- Created by: Colin McNaughton
- Starring: Adam Godley; Nicky Croydon; Hugh Laurie; Susan Sheridan; Neil McCaul; Ada Posta
- Composer: Keith Hopwood
- Country of origin: United Kingdom
- Original language: English
- No. of seasons: 1
- No. of episodes: 26

Production
- Running time: 15 minutes per episode (approx.)
- Production companies: Link Entertainment; Varga London

Original release
- Network: ITV (CITV)
- Release: 21 September – 29 October 2000

Preston Pig is a British traditionally animated children's television series which aired on CITV in 2000. It was based on a series of children's books, written and illustrated by Colin McNaughton. It was shown on weekdays from 3pm until 3:15pm, on CITV. However, since 2011, it no longer airs on CITV. The show officially went into production in March 1999, to air in September 2000.

== Characters ==
- Preston Pig – The main character, a pig who is a football fanatic.
- Mr. Wolf – A wolf who always unsuccessfully tries to catch Preston for dinner.
- Pumpkin – Preston's best friend.
- Granny – Preston's grandmother.
- Billy – A bully who is rude to the little pigs.

== Episodes ==
#	Title	Summary	Air Date
1	Goal	Preston the world's most brilliant football player, is on his way to the store. He takes his ball and dribbles right through a flower garden, shoots hitting Billy the Bully, and scores knocking off a police officer's hat. But Preston doesn't realise that Mr Wolf, who keeps getting blamed for the pig's messes, is in hot pursuit, and getting closer every minute!	21 September 2000
2	Splash	Preston Pig goes for a swim in the Synchronised Swimming Class with his teacher, Miss Mioa, but, as usual, things don't turn out quite as expected.	22 September 2000
3	Saturday Job	Preston gets a job working at the supermarket so he can have money to buy his dad expensive tickets to a football game.	23 September 2000
4	Mr Wolf's Own Goal	Preston's football mania nearly lands him in hot water.	24 September 2000
5	Wolf on the Run	An unexpected encounter with Mr Wolf leads Preston to believe in magic.	25 September 2000
6	Ham of the Match	Football is the name of the game when Preston sets out to win the cup, and Mr Wolf pitches in to save the day.	26 September 2000
7	Pooh!	Preston Pig and Mister Wolf are both on babysitting duties.	27 September 2000
8	Quiz Show	Preston and Mr Wolf go head to head on a television quiz show.	2 October 2000
9	Fancy That	Mr. Wolf takes over Preston’s class as a new teacher named Miss Howler and does a terrible job at it.	3 October 2000
10	The Princess and the Pig	Preston falls asleep in class and dreams of being a knight in shining armour destined to save the kingdom from the villainous Baron Von Wolf.	4 October 2000
11	Whee!	Pumpkin helps Preston to become a skateboard champion, when Billy thinks he's going to win the skateboarding competition, but will Mr. Wolf catch Preston before he wins?	5 October 2000
12	Marrows	Add Description	6 October 2000
13	Oops!	Preston takes the basket full goodies to visit Granny and Mr. Wolf follows him when his mother tells the story the Little Red Riding Hood, and Preston's father got woodcutter to chase that wolf away.	7 October 2000
14	Parp	Preston is left in charge of picking his own instrument to take home and lock the school door whilst Miss Thump goes out for a “hair appointment”.	8 October 2000
15	The Package	It’s Preston’s birthday, but his dad says that he must go out to buy a package at the train station.	9 October 2000
16	The Good, the Bad and the Porky	Add Description	10 October 2000
17	Pigsvillathon	Add Description	11 October 2000
18	Boo	Add Description	12 October 2000
19	Preston's Pet	Add Description	13 October 2000
20	Mr Wolf Learns a Lesson	Add Description	14 October 2000
21	Wolf Club	Add Description	15 October 2000
22	Dig, Dig, Dig	Add Description	20 October 2000
23	Forsakin' Bacon	Add Description	21 October 2000
24	Grandpa Wolf	Add Description	22 October 2000
25	Snout Snouts	Preston is practising his scouting skills, while Mr Wolf is still scouting around for a pork dinner!	24 October 2000
26	Robopig	Add Description	29 October 2000

== Voice Cast ==
- Nicky Croydon as Preston
- Hugh Laurie as Mr Wolf
- Adam Godley as Preston's Dad
- Ada Posta as Preston's Mum
- Neil McCaul as Additional Voices
- Susan Sheridan as Pumpkin/Additional Voices

The music was composed by Keith Hopwood.

== Home media ==
Preston Pig was released on VHS in the United Kingdom in 2000 and two VHS tapes were also released in Australia, Pig School and Ham of the Match. A single DVD of the show was released in the United Kingdom, called Football Champion.

== Broadcast ==
Preston Pig aired on CITV in the United Kingdom. However, the programme itself no longer airs on CITV, but can apparently be found on VHS, DVD, and online.
