= Chris Emmett =

British actor and comedian (born 1938)

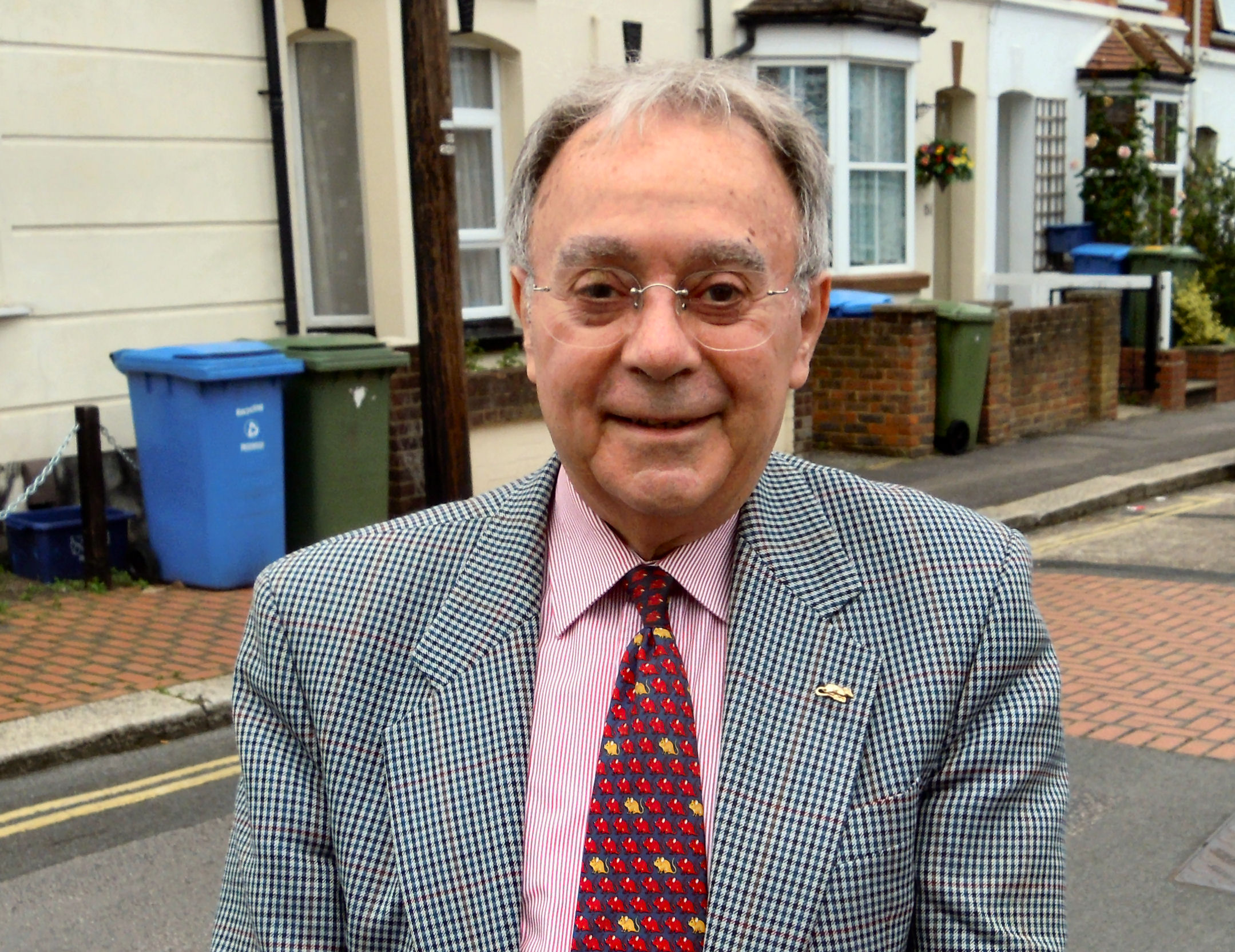
- Chris Emmett in 2017
- Born: Christopher Roderick Emmett; 13 December 1938 (age 87); Nuneaton, Warwickshire, England
- Occupations: actor, comedian
- Years active: 1964–present

Christopher Roderick Emmett (born 13 December 1938) is a British actor and comedian best known for his work on the BBC Radio 4 comedies The Burkiss Way (1976-1980) and Alison and Maud (2002-2004).

Born in Nuneaton, Warwickshire, he was a regular on various series starring Roy Hudd, including The News Huddlines, The Newly Discovered Casebook of Sherlock Holmes, Huddwinks and Crowned Hudds. Emmett was also a regular on Week Ending, and appeared in a number of sketches in the television game show 3-2-1. In August 2003, he featured in the Talking to One Person episode of BBC Radio 4 comedy Smelling of Roses, playing the old disc jockey Kenny Truman as he tried to get a job on radio station Gleam FM.

Emmett is a member of the showbusiness charitable fraternity the Grand Order of Water Rats, and is a former King Rat.
