= Milton Johns =

English character actor

- Born: John Robert Milton; 13 May 1938 (age 88); Bristol, England
- Occupation: Actor
- Years active: 1960s–2007

John Robert Milton (born 13 May 1938), known professionally as Milton Johns, is an English retired character actor who worked almost continuously throughout his career. A versatile talent, he specialises in sinister or obsequious roles and featured regularly in many British popular television series for both adults and children. He trained at the Bristol Old Vic Theatre School.

== Biography ==
Johns was born on 13 May 1938 in Bristol. He trained at the Bristol Old Vic Theatre School between 1959-62, after graduating he continued to work at the Bristol Old Vic until 1965. The same year he made his West End debut in War & Peace. He subsequently did seasons in repetory theatre in Belgrave, Coventry and Sheffield.

== Career ==
Johns' early television roles include Object Z, Orlando, No Hiding Place, Softly, Softly and The Troubleshooters. In 1966, Johns featured in the recurring part as Grimaud in the BBC adaption of The Three Musketeers. Other roles have included parts in Poldark, Born and Bred, Ever Decreasing Circles, Home to Roost, Dempsey and Makepeace, Murder Most English, Shoestring, Yes Minister, Some Mothers Do 'Ave 'Em, Softly, Softly, Going Straight, The Good Life, The Saint, Don't Wait Up, Butterflies, Minder, A Horseman Riding By, Campion and Z-Cars.

Johns also appeared in the TV mini-series Moll Flanders in 1996, where he played a pawnshop owner.

He is best known for being in Happy Families (1989) as Mr Alphonso, the café manager of Mrs Wobble, Coronation Street as Brendan Scott (1991–93), the shopkeeper who died of a heart attack while pedalling along the eponymous cobbled street. He played the landlord in The Basil Brush Show (2002–07). He also played jobsworth Derek Cassidy in Murphy's Mob, an ITV children's television drama series (1982–85) his character helped to manage the building used by the junior supporters of the football club, Dunmore United. Johns appeared in Doctor Who on three occasions: as Theodore Benik in The Enemy of the World (1967-68); Guy Crayford in The Android Invasion (1975); and Castellan Kelner in The Invasion of Time (1978).

In 1972 Johns starred in the children's Sunday evening series The Intruder and in 1977, appeared in another children's series, Midnight Is A Place. In 1983 he also appeared in the Grange Hill spin-off Tucker's Luck. Johns also appeared as an Imperial Officer (Captain Bewil) in the 1980 film, The Empire Strikes Back. He played Perker in the 1985 adaptation of The Pickwick Papers. In the 1988 television mini-series War and Remembrance, he took the role of Nazi SS officer Adolf Eichmann.

== Selected Filmography ==
Year	Title	Role	Notes
1965	Hereward the Wake	First Witch	Episode: "Face to Face"
1965	Object Z	Haziz	Episode: "The Solution"
1965	Orlando	Darlington	Episode: "A Code for Life"
1966	No Hiding Place	Smithy Smith	Episode: "A Bottle Full of Sixpence"
1966	Softly, Softly	Ralph Rayburn; Sammy Roach	3 episodes
1966	The Troubleshooters	Larry Dwyer	Episode: "Four Cheers for Godfrey"
1966 - 1967	The Three Musketeers	Grimaud	6 episodes
1967	The Newcomers	Mr. Rowe	2 episodes
1967	The Saint	Vargas	Episode: "Island of Chance"
1967-68	Doctor Who	Theodore Benik	Serial: "The Enemy of the World"
1968	Mr. Rose	Larry	Episode: "The Less-Than-Iron-Duke"
1968	Public Eye	Terry Streton	Episode: "If This Is Lucky, I'd Rather Be Jonah"
1968	Sexton Blake	Gully	Episode: "The Case of the Gaping Goldfish" (Part 2 - "Menace for Miranda")
1969	The First Churchills	Ferguson	Episode: "Rebellion"
1969	The Flaxton Boys	Josiah Meekin	2 episodes
1969	Paul Temple	Mate	Episode: "Which One of Us is Me?"
1970	Manhunt	Renard	Episode: "One More River"
1970 - 1975	Softly, Softly: Task Force	Maurice Hobbes; Charley Smith	2 episodes
1971	The Mind of Mr. J.G. Reeder	Lidgett	Episode: "The Treasure House"
1971	The Misfit	Evans	Episode: "On Paperback Revolutionaries"
1971 - 1973	Z-Cars	Keogh; Cyril Johnson	3 episodes
1972	Budgie	Nervous Docherty	Episode: "The Outside Man"
1972	The Intruder	Sonny	6 episodes
1972	New Scotland Yard	Marty Lewis	Episode: "The Banker"
1973	Baffled!	Dr. Reed	Film
1973	Crown Court	Gus Enderby	Episode: "The Most Expensive Steak in the World" (3 episodes)
1973	The Protectors	Conway	Episode: "Petard"
1975	Doctor Who	Guy Crayford	Serial: "The Android Invasion"
1975	Poldark	Matthew Sanson	3 episodes
1977	The Good Life	Ernie	Episode: "The Weaver's Tale"
1977	King of the Castle	Ergon; Hawker	5 episodes
1977	Murder Most English	George Lintz	2 episodes
1977 - 1978	Midnight Is A Place	Bob Bludward	4 episodes
1978	A Horseman Riding By	Reverend Horsey	5 episodes
1978	Doctor Who	Castellan Kelner	Serial: "The Invasion of Time"
1978	Going Straight	Mr. Kirby	Episode: "Going Home"
1978	Some Mothers Do 'Ave 'Em	Mr. Denham (uncredited)	Episode: "Moving House"
1979	Two's Company	Charles	Episode: "The Friendly Aristocrats"
1979 - 1983	Butterflies	Mr. Conrad	6 episodes
1980	Cowboys	Shopkeeper	Episode: "Was it Eddie Croucher?"
1980	The Empire Strikes Back	Captain Bewil (Imperial Officer)	Film
1980	Hammer House of Horror	A.J. Powers	Serial: The House that Bled to Death
1980	Shoestring	Porter	Episode: "Looking for Mr Wright"
1980	Yes Minister	Ron Watson	Episode: "The Economy Drive"
1981 - 1983	The Gaffer	Williams	3 episodes
1982	In Loving Memory	Gerald Booth	Episode: "God Rest Ye Merry Gentlemen"
1982	Solo	Mr. Breck	Episode #2.3
1982 - 1985	Murphy's Mob	Derek Cassidy	49 episodes
1983	The Citadel	Aneurin Rees	2 episodes
1983	The Professionals	Clerk	Episode: "No Stone"
1983	Tucker's Luck	Mr. Powell	4 episodes
1985	Dempsey and Makepeace	Sid Lowe	Episode: "Tequila Sunrise"
1985	Full House	Mr. Friendly	Episode: "First Time Buyers"
1985	Home to Roost	Charles Smith	Episode: "Suspect"
1985	The Pickwick Papers	Perker	7 episodes (TV mini-series)
1986	Ever Decreasing Circles	Dan Danby	Episode: "House to Let"
1986	Fresh Fields	Customs Officer	Episode: "Happy Returns"
1987	Bergerac	Lonny Rice	Episode: "A Desirable Little Residence"
1987	Remington Steele	Roderick Smithers	Episode: "Steele Hanging in There" (Part 2)
1987	Super Gran	Mr. L. Chop	Episode: "Super Gran and the Rookie Recruit"
1988 - 1990	Don't Wait Up	Registrar	2 episodes
1988 - 1989	War and Remembrance	Adolf Eichmann	2 episodes
1989	Brookside	Dr. Medley	2 episodes
1989	Campion	William Potter	Episode: "Death of a Ghost" (2 parts)
1989	Minder	Mr. Sinclair	Episode: "The Last Video Show"
1989 - 1990	Happy Families	Various	13 episodes
1990	El C.I.D.	Webb	Episode: "Spanish Eyes"
1991	Boon	Roland Salmon	Episode: "When Harry Met Janice"
1991 - 1993	Coronation Street	Brendan Scott	32 episodes
1992	Haggard	Rector	Episode: "Just Cause"
1994	Class Act	Philip Parkes	Episode #1.3
1994	Stanley's Dragon	Mr. Batley	Film
1995	Down to Earth	Mr. Wilkins	Episode #1.4
1996	Moll Flanders	Mr Mickeljohn	Episode #1.3 (TV mini-series)
1996	The Upper Hand	Store Manager	Episode: "Oh Baby, Oh Baby"
1997	Chalk	Hugo	Episode: "The Interview"
1997	Sharpe	Hopkinson	Episode: "Sharpe's Revenge"
1998	Knight School	Grim Reaper	Episode: "The Wooden Badger of St. Cuthbert's"
1998	The X-Files	British Valet	Film
1999 - 2000	The Scarlet Pimpernel	Fisher	4 episodes (TV mini-series)
2001	Micawber	Mr. Chettle	Episode: "Micawber Learns the Truth"
2002	Born and Bred	Ernest Gilles	2 episodes
2002	Making a Killing	L.T. Harvey	Film
2002 - 2007	The Basil Brush Show	Mr. Rossiter	7 episodes
