= Dogger (book) =

1977 children's book by Shirley Hughes

- Front cover of unknown edition
- Author: Shirley Hughes
- Illustrator: Shirley Hughes
- Cover artist: Hughes
- Language: English
- Genre: Children's picture book
- Publisher: Bodley Head
- Publication date: 1977
- Publication place: United Kingdom
- Pages: 32 pp
- ISBN: 978-0-370-30006-1
- OCLC: 4034917
- LC Class: PZ7.H87395 Do; PZ7.H87395 Dav 1978

Dogger is a children's picture book written and illustrated by Shirley Hughes, published by The Bodley Head in 1977.

== Plot ==
Dave is a young boy whose favorite toy is a stuffed brown dog named Dogger. One night, Dave is unable to find Dogger before he goes to bed. His parents and older sister Bella help him search for Dogger to no avail, and Dave struggles to fall asleep without the presence of his beloved toy.

The following day, Dave's mother takes him and his siblings to their school fair, where Dave finds himself still too distraught over the loss of Dogger to enjoy any of the activities. Dave finds a stall selling toys, where he discovers Dogger being sold for five pence. He attempts to notify the woman working the stall that Dogger is his toy and has ended up at the stand by mistake, but she is too busy to listen. Dave opts to buy Dogger back, but this also backfires when he realizes he only has three pence. After Dave finds Bella and tells her what has happened, she returns to the stall with him, only to discover that Dogger has been purchased by a little girl. Bella confronts the girl, explaining that Dogger belongs to Dave and offering to buy Dogger back from her, but the girl refuses. Dave begins to cry, leading the girl to do the same until she notices and admires a giant teddy bear Bella has won from a raffle. Bella offers to give the girl the bear in exchange for Dogger, and she agrees, much to Dave's delight.

That night, Dave asks Bella if she will miss her bear. Bella admits that she didn't really like the bear much to begin with, as he was too big and would not fit in her bed with her and all her other stuffed toys.

== Publication history ==
Prentice-Hall published the first U.S. edition in 1978 under the title David and Dog.

== Reception ==
Dogger has received positive reviews. Kirkus Reviews found that "The loss and retrieval of a favorite toy animal is agreeably handled" and "Pleasant, if unoriginal—as usual, Hughes' rumpled tots and general clutter make you feel instantly at home." while The Guardian called it "the perfect children's story—there is conflict then resolution." and BookTrust found it "heart-warming ... that will especially appeal to any youngsters who have a special favourite toy." Zena Sutherland, writing in The Best in Children's Books. found "A touching story comes from England, but it has qualities that should make it universally appealing" and concluded "Familiar concepts, a plot nicely gauged for small children's interest and comprehension, and a credible happy ending should satisfy listeners, while the beautifully detailed paintings ... should engage both readers-aloud and their audiences."

The librarians recommend the book for "young readers" and for ages 4+.

== Awards ==
Hughes won the 1977 Kate Greenaway Medal from the Library Association, recognising the year's best children's book illustration by a British subject. For the 50th anniversary of the Medal (1955–2005), a panel of experts named Dogger one of the top ten winning works, which composed the ballot for a public election of the nation's favourite. Dogger won the public vote and thus it was named the all-time "Greenaway of Greenaways" on 21 June 2007. (The public voted on the panel's shortlist of ten, selected from the 53 winning works 1955 to 2005. Hughes and Dogger polled 26% of the vote to 25% for its successor, the 1978 medalist Janet Ahlberg and Each Peach Pear Plum.)
