= Sheila Ruskin =

British actress (born 1946)

- Born: Sheila Dawson; 28 March 1946 (age 80); Eastham, Cheshire, England
- Occupation: Actress
- Years active: 1969–present
- Spouse: David Wood (m. 1966; div. 1970)

Sheila Ruskin (born 28 March 1946) is an English actress.

== Early life ==
While still a baby, she travelled with her missionary father, the Rev. Bryan Dawson (who for many years was minister at Eastham Presbyterian Church) to East Pakistan after he was posted there. Returning to boarding school in England at the age of six, she received her first taste of the theatre when she played an angel in a Christmas play at the age of seven. Initially wanting to become a dancer, she dropped this idea after growing too tall so decided to study Fine Art at the Ruskin School of Art (probably where she got her acting name from). After joining the university's experimental theatre club, Ruskin went into repertory including being an understudy to Elizabeth Taylor in a stage version of Doctor Faustus.

== Career ==
She played Vipsania in the BBC adaptation of I, Claudius (1976); Kassia in the Doctor Who serial The Keeper of Traken (1981); and Alta One in the Blake's 7 episode "Redemption" (1979).

Her other TV credits include MacKenzie, Special Branch, The Pallisers, How Green Was My Valley, The Sweeney, Tales of the Unexpected, The Professionals, Minder, Bergerac, Boon, Taggart, Miss Marple, Parnell and the Englishwoman, Casualty, Rumpole of the Bailey, Strangers and Brothers, The Bill, Dalziel and Pascoe, Holby City, Midsomer Murders, The Intruder, and The Lost Boys. In 2005 and 2008, she appeared in numerous episodes of the BBC medical soap opera Doctors in the recurring role of Marcia Holland.

== Personal life ==
She was married to the actor David Wood from 1966 until 1970. The couple wrote a musical play, The Owl and the Pussycat Went to See, based on the works of Edward Lear.

== Selected filmography ==
- This, That and the Other (1969)
- She'll Follow You Anywhere (1971)
- The Swiss Conspiracy (1975)
- Who Is Killing the Great Chefs of Europe? (1978)
- The Great Riviera Bank Robbery (1979)
- We'll Support You Evermore (1985) as Sue Friday
