= Funnybones =

Television series

- Created by: Janet Ahlberg; Allan Ahlberg; André Amstutz
- Written by: Jocelyn Stevenson
- Directed by: Gary Hurst
- Narrated by: Ray Gravell (Welsh); Griff Rhys Jones (English)
- Music by: Ernie Wood
- Country of origin: United Kingdom
- Original languages: Welsh; English
- No. of series: 1
- No. of episodes: 12

Production
- Executive producers: Theresa Plummer-Andrews; Christopher Grace
- Producer: Naomi Jones
- Editor: Robert Francis
- Running time: 5 minutes
- Production company: Cartŵn Cymru

Original release
- Network: S4C (Welsh); BBC1 (English); BBC2 (English)
- Release: 29 September – 15 December 1992

Funnybones (Welsh: Sgerbyde) is a British children's animated comedy series based on the book series of the same name, written by Janet Ahlberg and Allan Ahlberg, illustrated by André Amstutz and first published in 1980. Cartŵn Cymru produced the series for S4C in association with William Heinemann Ltd. and BBC Enterprises.

Originally broadcast in Welsh as part of S4C's Slot Meithrin strand, the English version of the series aired from 29 September to 15 December 1992 on BBC1 and BBC2 as part of Children's BBC. Ray Gravell provided all the voices in the Welsh version, while popular comedian Griff Rhys Jones provided the voices in the English version. Each episode is five minutes in length.

== Plot ==
The series focuses on the adventures of a pair of skeletons, who were the eponymous Funnybones. The characters in the series are Big Funnybone (whose catchphrase was "good idea"), Little Funnybone (the brains of the group), Dog Funnybone (whose catchphrase was "Woof") and Cat (whose catchphrase was "Meow").

== Main characters ==
- Big: The larger skeleton (who wore a mini red bowler hat in the TV series and who wore various hats in the storybooks and in his wishful ideas). He said "good idea" to every idea that Little had.
- Little: The smaller skeleton (who didn't wear a hat), who came up with many ideas for the skeletons to do in every episode.
- Dog: The pet dog of the skeletons who loved bones, digging holes, and found everything that the skeletons needed.
- Cat: The pet black cat of the skeletons, who always got chased by Dog. Unlike other characters, she was not a skeleton.
- Moon Man: The Crescent-moon-shaped character who was always the narrator in each episode. Unlike other characters, he was also not a skeleton.
- Mr. Bonehead: The skeleton owner of the pet shop (who wore a flat cap with a pencil and an apron), who Big and Little took Dog into with a view to swapping him for another pet in the episode "The Pet Shop".
- Dr. Bones: The skeleton doctor (who wore a doctor's coat and glasses with a first aid kit, a stethoscope and a leg tapping hammer) who helped Big and Little to stop them from bumping in the night in the episode "Bumps in the Night".

== Episode guide via storybook comparison ==
On the television series of Funnybones, six episodes have the same title as the stories from the published books, three episodes were retitled from the storybook versions, and the other three were written for TV and didn't use a storybook as source material. The final episode of the television series, however, was based on the first storybook of Funnybones, while the first episode was based on the second storybook called "The Pet Shop". All twelve episodes were originally shown on BBC One and repeated on BBC Two as part of the CBeebies and Children's BBC strand, as it was known before 1999, on Tuesdays at 4:00 pm.

Title of episode	Title of storybook based on	Air date	Summary
1. The Pet Shop	2. Same title	29 September 1992	Big and Little decide to swap Dog for another pet, because all he does is bark and dig holes. Big and Little can not find a perfect pet as the goldfish, the parrot, the hippopotamus and a family of rabbits cause nothing but problems, so they decide to finally swap the family of rabbits back for Dog.
2. Bumps in the Night	4. Same title	6 October 1992	It is a particularly dark, dark night tonight, and Big and Little keep bumping into each other, making them fall to pieces at their House, the Park and the Midnight Funfair, and there is only one thing to do: send in Dr. Bones, who does a great job of patching them up to stop them from bumping in the night.
3. Give the Dog a Bone	5. Same title	13 October 1992	Dog is having his favourite dream, the one about a big, juicy bone. After Dog wakes up from his favourite dream he chases after other animals that have got the big, juicy bone including Cat.
4. Dinosaurs	6. Dinosaur Dreams	20 October 1992	Dog gets left behind when Big and Little decide to visit the dark, dark dinosaur museum. When Dog follows Big and Little to the dinosaur museum, he thinks a huge, huge dinosaur wanted to hurt them.
5. The Ghost Train	7. Same title	27 October 1992	Big, Little and Dog are invited to take a trip on the Ghost Train full of ghosts and monsters to the dark, dark seaside and back again. The envelope containing the ghost train tickets was delivered by the Skeleton Postman.
6. Skeleton Crew	8. Same title	3 November 1992	The Funnybones are on a boat holiday on the dark, dark sea. The Skeletons saw an Octopus, Skeleton Pirates and a Gorilla before a dark, dark thunderstorm takes them home from a desert island on their raft.
7. Mystery Tour	9. Same title	10 November 1992	The Funnybones receive an invitation to a party at the end of a Mystery Tour. The Mystery Tour begins with a huge party cracker.
8. Wishbone	N/A	17 November 1992	The Funnybones find a huge wishbone, and try to decide which one of them has the best idea for what to wish for. Ideas include being firefighters, flying like birds, being kings, going to live on the moon, being a famous rockstar, being invisible etc.
9. Shake, Rattle and Roll	N/A	24 November 1992	The Funnybones decide to put on a show and Cat tries to put up a poster advertising the show.
10. Cat Chase	3. The Black Cat	1 December 1992	The white, white Dog disappears in the white, white snow and the black, black Cat disappears in the dark, dark shadows. At the Pet Shop Big and Little tell Mr. Bonehead that they need a lead for Dog.
11. City Nights	N/A	8 December 1992	Little gets bored with the quiet life on the dark, dark hill. So he decides to go to the city before he gets worried about Big and Dog getting lost. "There are too many skeletons" says the Big Skeleton in the city, where even the Underground has them.
12. Night Fright	1. Funnybones	15 December 1992	Cat gets left behind when the skeletons decide to go out and frighten anybody they come across. Dog falls to pieces, so Big and Little put Dog back together again.

== Broadcast ==
This was one of several cartoons dubbed by the then-new Irish post production company Telegael, to demonstrate children's programming possibilities for a proposed television station in Irish. The result, entitled Smior agus Smiortán (translated to the English language as Marrow & Little Marrow), was broadcast on Ireland's two national television stations, RTÉ1 and 2, in 1993.

The series also aired on ABC in Australia, from 1 February 1994 to 28 January 1999 as well as airing on the channel in Vanuatu and Papua New Guinea, SABC2 in South Africa, as part of a block for children called Mini-TV, the military television network BFBS in Germany and West Germany as well as being shown on the channel in Cyprus and Falkland Islands, TVO in Canada, Yle TV2 in Finland, TVNZ 2 in New Zealand and Cartoon Network, as part of a block for preschoolers called Small World and FOX Family Channel, as part of Mister Moose's Fun Time, a spin-off from The All New Captain Kangaroo in the United States, S4C in Wales, and BBC One, BBC Two and CBeebies (when repeated) in the United Kingdom.

== Home Media ==
A VHS release containing all twelve episodes of the series, entitled "Funnybones – Bumps in the Night", was released by BBC Video in 1992 shortly after the series ended. The series has also been released on VHS in Bulgaria and Australia.
