= Shirley Hughes =

English illustrator and author (1927–2022)

Shirley Hughes CBE
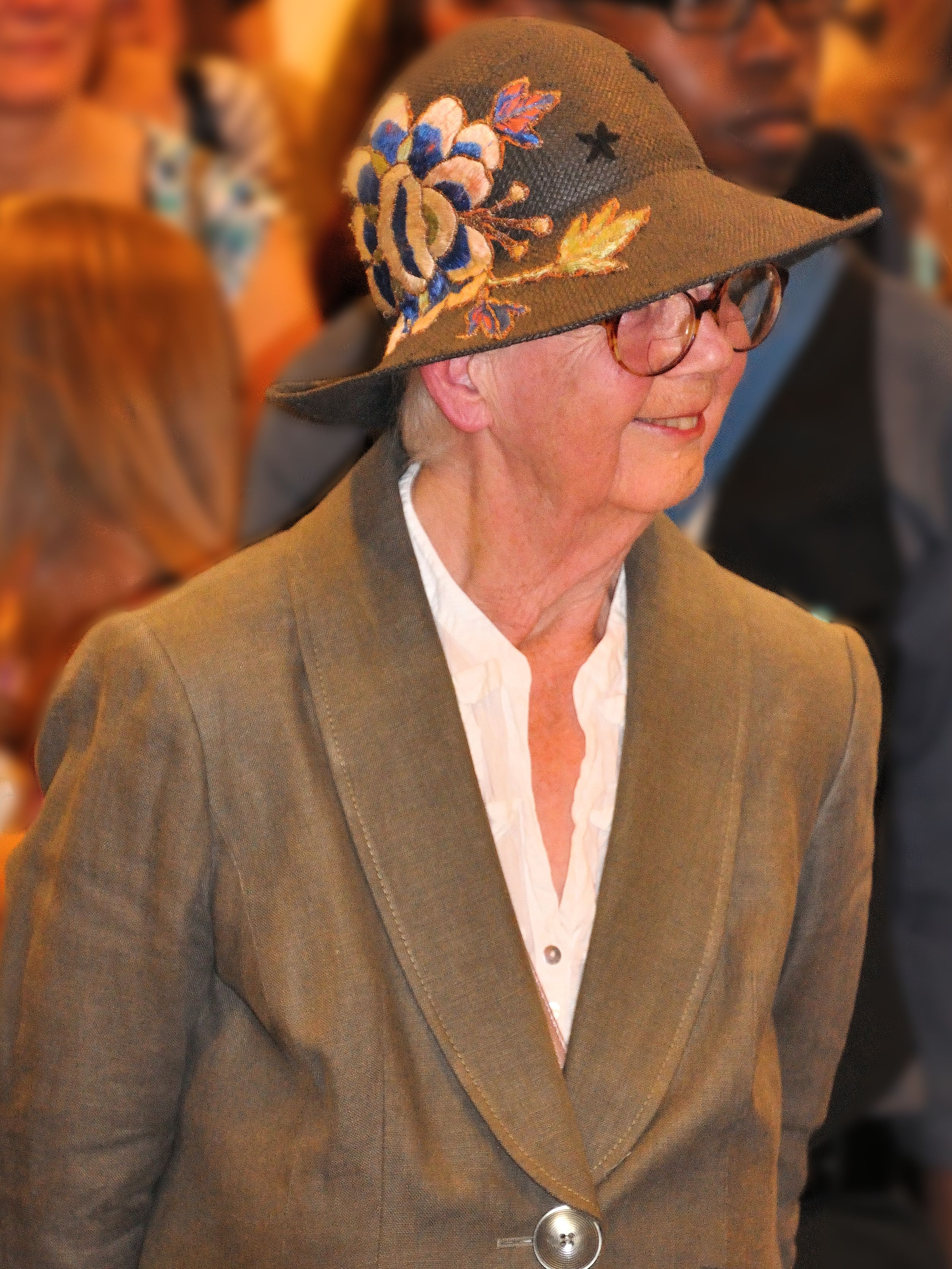
- Hughes in 2011
- Born: Winifred Shirley Hughes; 16 July 1927; West Kirby, England
- Died: 25 February 2022 (aged 94); Kensington, London, England
- Occupations: Illustrator, writer
- Spouse: John Vulliamy (m. 1952; died 2002)
- Children: 3
- Writing career
- Period: 1960–2022
- Genres: Children's literature, picture books
- Notable works: Dogger; Ella's Big Chance
- Notable awards: Kate Greenaway Medal; 1977, 2003

Winifred Shirley Hughes CBE (16 July 1927 – 25 February 2022) was an English author and illustrator. She wrote more than fifty books, which have sold more than 11.5 million copies, and illustrated more than two hundred.

Hughes won the 1977 and 2003 Kate Greenaway Medals for British children's book illustration. In 2007, her 1977 winner, Dogger, was named the public's favourite winning work of the award's first fifty years. She won the inaugural BookTrust lifetime achievement award in 2015. She was a recipient of the Eleanor Farjeon Award. She was a patron of the Association of Illustrators.

== Early life ==
Hughes was born in West Kirby, then in the county of Cheshire (now in Merseyside), on 16 July 1927. The daughter of Thomas James Hughes, owner of the Liverpool-based store chain T. J. Hughes and his wife Kathleen (née Dowling), she grew up in West Kirby on the Wirral. She recalled being inspired from childhood by artists like Arthur Rackham and W. Heath Robinson, and later by the cinema and the Walker Art Gallery. Particular favourites of hers were Edward Ardizzone, and EH Shepard who illustrated Wind in the Willows and Winnie-the-Pooh.

She enjoyed frequent visits to the theatre with her mother, which gave her a love for observing people and a desire to create.

She was educated at West Kirby Grammar School, but Hughes said she was not a particularly good student academically, and when she was 17, she left school to study drawing and costume design at the Liverpool School of Art. In Liverpool she found that societal pressure was put on her to find a husband and then not achieve much with her life. She longed to escape from these claustrophobic expectations, so moved to Oxford in order to attend the Ruskin School of Drawing and Fine Art.

== Personal life ==
After art school she moved to Notting Hill, London. In 1952, she married John Sebastian Papendiek Vulliamy, an architect and etcher, of the Vulliamy family. They had three children together: the journalist Ed Vulliamy, the geneticist Tom Vulliamy, and Clara Vulliamy, who is also a children's book illustrator.

== Career ==
No one since Rembrandt has so perfectly captured the precarious half-balance of the toddler's toddle. And I don't think anyone ever has depicted ordinary domestic mess so honestly...The parents were also always present in the story – something unusual in children's books. Even more unusual, the siblings in her stories are often really good – even gallant – to each other. The neighbourhood is warm and friendly and multicultural. Her world is our world at its best. The mess and the frizz have their place within a bigger conviction that stories about ordinary children doing ordinary things – getting locked out, losing a toy – could be just as full of courage, wonder and grace as any epic of fairyland.

— Article published in the New Statesman magazine at the time of her death discusses her work

In Oxford, Hughes was encouraged to work in the picture book format and make lithographic illustrations. However, after graduating she attempted to pursue her ambitions of becoming a theatre designer, and took a job at the Birmingham Rep Theatre. She quickly decided that the "enclosed hothouse" of the theatre world wasn't for her, so followed her former tutor's advice and started working as an illustrator. She began by illustrating the books of other authors, including My Naughty Little Sister by Dorothy Edwards and The Bell Family by Noel Streatfeild. The first published book she both wrote and illustrated was Lucy & Tom's Day, which was made into a series of stories. She went on to write over fifty more stories, including Dogger (1977), the Alfie series (1977), featuring a young boy named Alfie and sometimes his sister Annie-Rose, and the Olly and Me series (1993). The Walker Art Gallery in her hometown of Liverpool hosted an exhibition of her work in 2003, which then moved to the Ashmolean Museum in Oxford.

Her most famous book, Dogger, is about a toy dog who is lost by a small boy, but is then reunited with his owner after being found in a jumble sale. This book was inspired by her son, Ed, who lost his favourite teddy in Holland Park. A real Dogger also existed, and was on display along with the rest of her work at her exhibition in London and Oxford.

Hughes illustrated 200 children's books throughout her career, which sold more than 10 million copies. In WorldCat participating libraries, eight of her ten most widely held works were Alfie books (1981 to 2002). The others were Dogger (rank second) and Out and About (1988). Hughes wrote her first novel in 2015, a young-adult book titled Hero on a Bicycle. She was 84 years of age when she wrote this.

Hughes died from bronchopneumonia at her home in Kensington, London, on 25 February 2022, aged 94. She was paid tribute to by the UK's largest children's reading charity, the BookTrust, who said they were "devastated" by her death and that her "incredible stories and illustrations, from Dogger to Alfie and Lucy and Tom, have touched so many generations and are still so loved. Thank you, Shirley.” Michael Morpurgo, author of War Horse, praised her, noting that she "began the reading lives of so many millions."

== Awards ==
Dogger (1977), which she wrote and illustrated, was the first story by Hughes to be widely published abroad and it was recognised by the Library Association's Kate Greenaway Medal as the year's best children's book illustration by a British subject. In celebration of the 70th anniversary of the companion Carnegie Medal in 2007, it named one of the top ten Greenaway Medal-winning works by an expert panel and then named the public favourite, or "Greenaway of Greenaways". (The public voted on the panel's shortlist of ten, selected from the 53 winning works 1955 to 2005. Hughes and Dogger polled 26% of the vote to 25% for its successor as medalist, Janet Ahlberg and Each Peach Pear Plum.)

Hughes won a second Greenaway (no illustrator has won three) for Ella's Big Chance (2003), her own adaptation of Cinderella, set in the 1920s. It was published in the U.S. as Ella's Big Chance: A Jazz-Age Cinderella (Simon & Schuster, 2004). She was also a three-time Greenaway commended runner up: for Flutes and Cymbals: Poetry for the Young (1968), a collection compiled by Leonard Clark; for Helpers (Bodley Head, 1975), which she wrote and illustrated; and for The Lion and the Unicorn (Bodley Head, 1998), which she wrote and illustrated (Highly Commended). (Note: Today there are usually eight books on the Greenaway shortlist. According to CCSU, some runners up through 2002 were Commended (from 1959) or Highly Commended (from 1974). There were 99 commendations of both kinds in 44 years; 31 high commendations in 29 years including Hughes and Jane Simmons in 1998. • No one has won three Greenaway Medals. Among the fourteen illustrators with two Medals, Hughes is one of seven with one book named to the Anniversary Top Ten (1955–2005); one of seven with at least one highly commended runner up (1974–2002); one of six with at least three commendations (1959–2002).)

In 1984, Hughes won the Eleanor Farjeon Award for distinguished service to children's literature, in 1999 she was awarded an OBE, and in 2000 she was made a Fellow of the Royal Society of Literature. She was also granted an Honorary Fellowship by Liverpool John Moores University and Honorary Degrees by the University of Liverpool in 2004 and the University of Chester in 2012.

Booktrust, the UK's largest reading charity, awarded Hughes their first lifetime achievement award in 2015.

Already Officer of the Order of the British Empire (OBE), Hughes was appointed Commander of the Order of the British Empire (CBE) in the 2017 New Year Honours for services to literature.

== Works ==
- Moving Molly ISBN 9780099916505
- Bathwater's Hot ISBN 9780688042028
- Noisy ISBN 9780744533774
- When We Went to the Park ISBN 9780744567373
- All Shapes and Sizes ISBN 9780888945167
- Colours ISBN 9780744509243
- Two Shoes, New Shoes ISBN 9780688042073
- The Snow Lady.
- Out and About ISBN 9780688076917
- Dogger ISBN 9781856817646
- Lucy and Tom's Christmas ISBN 9780140504699
- Lucy and Tom at the Seaside ISBN 9780140504699
- Tales of Trotter Street ISBN 9780763600907
- Hero on a Bicycle ISBN 9781406336115
- The Christmas Eve Ghost ISBN 9780763644727
- The Lion and the Unicorn ISBN 9780789425553
- Helpers ISBN 9780099926504
- Angel Mae ISBN 9780744511369
- Dogger's Christmas ISBN 9781782300809
- Jonadab and Rita ISBN 9780370329284

=== Alfie stories ===
- Alfie Gets in First ISBN 9780440841289
- Alfie Gives a Hand ISBN 9780099256076
- Alfie Wins a Prize ISBN 9781862309937
- Alfie's Feet ISBN 9780688016586
- Alfie's Weather ISBN 9780099404255
- An Evening at Alfie's ISBN 9780370305882
- The Big Alfie and Annie Rose Story Book ISBN 9780688076726
- Rhymes for Annie Rose ISBN 9780370319803

== Works by other authors, illustrated by Hughes ==
- Rust, Doris, All Sorts of Days: Six Stories for the Very Young (Faber and Faber, 1955)
- Corrin, Sara and Stephen, Stories for Eight-Year-Olds (Faber and Faber, 1974)
