= Burglar Bill =

1977 children's picture book by Janet and Allan Ahlberg

- Puffin Books edition
- Author: Allan Ahlberg
- Illustrator: Janet Ahlberg
- Cover artist: Janet Ahlberg
- Language: English
- Genre: Picture book
- Publisher: Heinemann
- Publication date: 1977
- Publication place: United Kingdom
- Media type: Print
- Pages: 32
- ISBN: 9780434925001
- OCLC: 4467452

Burglar Bill is a 1977 children's picture book illustrated by Janet Ahlberg and written by Allan Ahlberg about a burglar who accidentally steals a baby. The book was a runner-up for the Kate Greenaway Medal in 1978.

== Plot summary ==
Burglar Bill is a career burglar. All of his possessions are stolen items, including the bed he goes to sleep in. One night, Burglar Bill comes across a box with holes in, and takes it. Upon arriving home, he discovers that within the box is a baby. The baby and Burglar Bill end up spending a day together, but when Bill is putting the baby to bed, he hears an intruder downstairs. He confronts the burglar, who he discovers is Burglar Betty, and they talk to one another to find they have much in common. Bill mentions his new infant friend that he found the night before. He introduces Betty to the baby, only for them both to discover that the baby is Betty's (Betty is a widow). They both decide to give thievery up and return everything they stole, before getting married and living happily together as a family.

== The Boyhood of Burglar Bill ==
The Boyhood of Burglar Bill by Allan Ahlberg was published in 2007. It is a middle-grade novel principally about football and friendship set in a Midland town in 1953. It is an autobiographical story rather than a true prequel to the picture book.

== Reception ==
Janet Ahlberg, winner of two Greenaway Medals, received runner-up for Burglar Bill (1977).

== Costume ==
The striking simplicity of Bill's burgling outfit – a black mask and cap and a striped shirt – has made Burglar Bill a popular party or Halloween costume choice.

== Buckingham Palace ==
Burglar Bill, played by Bradley Walsh, put in an appearance at the Children's Party at the Palace, a celebration of British children's literature held in Buckingham Palace Garden in 2006 in honour of the Queen's 80th birthday.

== Another Burglar Bill ==
Burglar Bill was a mock recitation piece written by F. Anstey for the satirical magazine Punch, or the London Charivari. With some other pieces it was published in 1888 as Burglar Bill, and other pieces for the young reciter. The piece tells the story of a burglar interrupted in his work by a lisping little girl who asks him to force open the stuck door of her doll's house. Moved by her friendliness, he does this, forgetting about the jewels he has come to steal, and is rewarded with a damson tartlet before escaping.

== In popular culture ==
The Kansas City, Missouri band "Pewep in the Formats" adapted Burglar Bill into a song on their album "The White Waterfalls of Oblivion."
