= The Intruder (TV series) =

1972 British TV drama series

- Starring: James Bate; Milton Johns; Sheila Ruskin
- Country of origin: United Kingdom
- Original language: English
- No. of series: 1
- No. of episodes: 8

Production
- Producer: Granada Television
- Running time: 25 minutes per episode

Original release
- Network: ITV
- Release: 2 January – 20 February 1972

The Intruder is a British drama series made by Granada Television for the ITV network and was broadcast on Sundays from 2 January to 20 February 1972. There were eight episodes made, all of them running 25 minutes.

The series was based on the children's book of this same name by John Rowe Townsend, published in 1970. The novel was well received, and won numerous awards, it was adapted for television in 1971, before being shown on television the following year. The series was shot on location, predominantly in the Cumbrian village of Ravenglass with some scenes filmed in Manchester and Anglesey.

== Plot ==
The life of Arnold Haithwaite (James Bate) a sixteen-year-old English boy begins to change when an overbearing and sinister one-eyed stranger called Sonny (Milton Johns) arrives in the small seaside village of Skirlston, claiming to be the real Arnold Haithwaite.

== Episodes ==
This episode guide features information which appears on the ITN Source website (http://www.itnsource.com/)

Episode One: The Stranger (broadcast: 2 Jan 1972)

Synopsis: Young Arnold Haithwaite's happy and uneventful life is turned around by a stranger called Sonny, claiming that he is the real Arnold Haithwaite. Arnold also meets two newcomers to his sleepy village, a 17-year-old girl and her younger brother Peter.

Episode Two: Jane (broadcast: 9 Jan 1972)

Episode Three: Norma (broadcast: 16 Jan 1972)

Episode Four: Miss Binns (broadcast: 23 Jan 1972)

Episode Five: Peter (broadcast: 30 Jan 1972)

Note: The character of Peter was played by musician, songwriter, composer, producer and actor Simon Fisher Turner.

Episode Six: Jane Again (broadcast: 6 Feb 1972)

Episode Seven: Mavis (broadcast: 13 Feb 1972)

Synopsis: Arnold discovers the secret of his identity, whilst the villainous Sonny finds the opposition getting tougher.

Note: This episode features an early television appearance from Lynne Perrie, who plays Mavis.

Episode Eight: Me (broadcast: 20 Feb 1972)

== Acclaim ==
When first broadcast, The Intruder won the top award as Britain's best TV show for children, and was repeated on Malaysian television in 1980. In 1973, Peter Plummer, who worked as a writer on the show won a BAFTA TV award for his contribution to the series. Speaking about the first episode in 2011 which had been released on DVD, Les Anderson wrote online: "Shot entirely on location on film this is not only atmospheric but also really creepy and unsettling. I look forward to seeing more."

== Commercial release ==
In 2010 Network included the first episode The Stranger as part of their DVD compilation Look-Back on 70s Telly - Issue 3. They then released the complete series on Blu-ray in October 2022.
