= Smelling of Roses =

BBC Radio 4 comedy series

Smelling of Roses is a BBC Radio 4 comedy series starring Prunella Scales and written by Simon Brett. There were four series, each of six episodes, broadcast from 2000 to 2003. The series was produced and directed by Maria Esposito (some episodes were directed by Brett). Scales stars as Rosie Burns, manager of her own event management business in Brighton, "In Any Event". The series also stars Arabella Weir as Rosie's daughter Kate, Rebecca Callard as Kate's daughter Jo, Duncan Preston as Bob, the company accountant, harbouring unrequited passion for Rosie, and Annette Badland as Tess, the remaining member of staff, whose love life with her (unheard) partner Kevin is a recurring topic. Typically of Brett, intergenerational female relationships were the unifying theme of the series: Kate has just returned to England after a long spell working abroad during which she has left her daughter to be brought up by Rosie. The format of the show allowed different, and usually difficult, clients to appear in each episode such as the old disc jockey Kenny Truman (as played by Chris Emmett) and radio station Gleam FM in the Talking to One Person episode.

== Episode list ==
Series	Episode	Title	First broadcast
1	1	Wise After the Event	3 May 2000
1	2	Out to Launch	10 May 2000
1	3	Positive Thinking	17 May 2000
1	4	Sleeping Partners	24 May 2000
1	5	Survival of the Fittest	31 May 2000
1	6	A Good Cause	7 June 2000
2	1	Romance is Dead	27 June 2001
2	2	French Connections	4 July 2001
2	3	The Comeback Kid	11 July 2001
2	4	Trade Secrets	18 July 2001
2	5	Bill of Fare	25 July 2001
2	6	Party Party	1 August 2001
3	1	Private Views	31 July 2002
3	2	Promises, Promises	7 August 2002
3	3	A Closed Book	14 August 2002
3	4	Leading a Merry Dance	21 August 2002
3	5	A Cheeky Little Number	28 August 2002
3	6	The Queen of Song	4 September 2002
4	1	A Supporting Role	4 August 2003
4	2	Verse Dramas	11 August 2003
4	3	Sustainable Development	18 August 2003
4	4	Talking to One Person	25 August 2003
4	5	Going Back to One's Roots	1 September 2003
4	6	The Comfort Man	8 September 2003
