= Poetry Please =

- Country of origin: United Kingdom
- Language: English
- Home station: BBC Radio 4

Poetry Please is a weekly radio programme broadcast on BBC Radio 4 in which listeners request poems, which are then read by a cast of actors. It is broadcast on Sunday afternoons and repeated the following Saturday night. The current presenter is Roger McGough, himself a poet. Performers have regularly included some of the top names in British acting, such as Judi Dench, Ian McKellen, Prunella Scales and Timothy West.

The programme marked its 40th year in 2019 and is known to be the longest running poetry programme broadcast anywhere in the world.

McGough's predecessor as presenter of Poetry Please was the Irish broadcaster and writer Frank Delaney. He described his pleasure in working on the programme, saying:

It meant was that I was now going to be working with the most beautiful material ever written in the English language, spoken by the most beautiful voices currently working in the English language, and that was nothing but a joy in prospect. It's wonderfully democratic, because you open the postbag and there is a request there for a poem you have either never heard of, by a poet whose name is completely strange to you, or something you have adored since childhood and whose phrases have been part of your many inner soundtracks, and either of those is a delight.

As of 2013, the most frequently-requested and broadcast poem was Stopping by Woods on a Snowy Evening by Robert Frost.
