= Happy Families (books) =

Series of children's books written by Allan Ahlberg

- Author: Allan Ahlberg
- Illustrator: Andre Amstutz
- Publisher: Puffin Books
- Published: 1980
- No. of books: 20

Happy Families is a series of children's books written by Allan Ahlberg; as the titles indicate, they were inspired by the traditional card game happy families. Ahlberg worked with a number of illustrators and the books were published by Puffin Books. The series form a transition for children between picture books and chapter books. It is a popular series, having sold in excess of 2.6 million copies since its launch in 1980.

A children's TV series based on the books, also called Happy Families, was produced by the BBC in the late 1980s.

== Titles ==
- Master Money the Millionaire, illustrated by Andre Amstutz
- Master Bun the Bakers' Boy, illustrated by Fritz Wegner
- Mrs Lather's Laundry, illustrated by Andre Amstutz
- Mr Creep the Crook, illustrated by Andre Amstutz
- Miss Jump the Jockey, illustrated by Andre Amstutz
- Master Track's Train, illustrated by Andre Amstutz
- Master Salt the Sailors' Son, illustrated by Andre Amstutz
- Mr and Mrs Hay the Horse, illustrated by Colin McNaughton
- Miss Brick the Builders' Baby, illustrated by Colin McNaughton
- Mrs Jolly's Joke Shop, illustrated by Colin Mcnaughton
- Mr Buzz the Beeman, illustrated by Faith Jaques
- Miss Dose the Doctors' Daughter, illustrated by Faith Jaques
- Mr Tick the Teacher, illustrated by Faith Jaques
- Mrs Wobble the Waitress, illustrated by Janet Ahlberg
- Mr Biff the Boxer, illustrated by Janet Ahlberg
- Mr Cosmo the Conjuror, illustrated by Joe Wright
- Mrs Plug the Plumber, illustrated by Joe Wright
- Miss Dirt the Dustman's Daughter, illustrated by Tony Ross
- Mrs Vole the Vet, illustrated by Emma Chichester Clark
- Ms Cliff the Climber, illustrated by Fritz Wegner
