= Janet and Allan Ahlberg =

British wife-and-husband children's book authors

Allan Ahlberg
- Born: 5 June 1938; Croydon, Surrey, England
- Died: 29 July 2025 (aged 87)
- Education: Sunderland Technical College
- Occupation: Writer
- Spouse(s): Janet Hall (m. 1969; died 1994) Vanessa Clarke
- Writing career
- Years active: 1976–2025
- Genre: Children's books
- Allan Ahlberg's voice from the BBC Radio 4 programme Desert Island Discs

Janet Ahlberg
- Born: Janet Hall; 21 October 1944; Yorkshire, England
- Died: 15 November 1994 (aged 50)
- Education: Sunderland Technical College
- Occupation: Illustrator
- Spouse: Allan Ahlberg (m. 1969)
- Writing career
- Years active: 1976–1994
- Genre: Children's books
- Notable awards: Kate Greenaway Medal (1978, 1991)

Janet Ahlberg (née Hall; 21 October 1944 – 15 November 1994) and Allan Ahlberg (5 June 1938 – 29 July 2025) were a British married couple who created many children's books, including picture books that regularly appear at the top of "most popular" lists for public libraries. They worked together for 20 years until Janet's death from cancer in 1994. He wrote the books and she illustrated many of them. Allan also wrote dozens of books with other illustrators. (Note: As of November 2012, the US national library catalogue (LCC record) shows 82 books created by Allan Ahlberg, published from 1976 to 2017 (forthcoming). They include multiple editions of some titles and do not include all titles in the selection listed here; for example, Janet's Last Book (1997) is missing. With one exception, all 82 listings specify either creators Janet and Allan Ahlberg or Allan Ahlberg and another illustrator; the exception is My Brother's Ghost (2001).: "My brother's ghost". LCC record. Retrieved 2012-11-14.)

Janet Ahlberg won two Kate Greenaway Medals for illustrating their books and the 1978 winner Each Peach Pear Plum was named one of the top ten winning works for the 50th anniversary of the Medal (1955–2005). In the US it was published by Viking Press in 1979 as Each Peach Pear Plum: an "I Spy" story; the national library catalogue summary explains, "Rhymed text and illustrations invite the reader to play 'I spy' with a variety of Mother Goose and other folklore characters."

== Background ==
Allan Ahlberg was born on 5 June 1938 in Croydon. An illegitimate child, he was adopted and brought up in Oldbury, in Sandwell in the West Midlands. He called it "a very poor Working class family" and identified himself as the baby in Peepo! (1981). He grew up with "no books and not much conversation". In 2008, he told The Independent that his first job was as a gravedigger.

Janet Hall was born on 21 October 1944 in Yorkshire and brought up in Leicester. The Ahlbergs both trained as teachers at Sunderland Technical College, where they met during the 1960s and married in 1969.

Janet illustrated My Growing Up Book by Bernard Garfinkel (New York: Platt & Munk, 1972), which the US Library of Congress calls "A child's record of the things he has learned and done from the time of birth through age five. Also provides a place to paste photographs."

Their joint work began when she asked him, a primary school teacher, to write a story.The first three published Ahlberg collaborations appeared in 1976 and 1977, The Old Joke Book, The Vanishment of Thomas Tull, and Burglar Bill (1977). Vanishment was bound in hardcover with a dust jacket, while many of their early works were "pictorial laminated boards". For Each Peach Pear Plum (Kestrel), Janet won the 1978 Kate Greenaway Medal from the British Library Association, recognising the year's best children's book illustration by a British subject. For the 50th anniversary of the Medal, a 2007 panel named it one of the top ten winning works, which composed the ballot for a public election of the nation's favourite. Each Peach Pear Plum finished a close second to the 1977 medalist, Dogger by Shirley Hughes; the margin was 1% of the vote.

Probably their greatest success was The Jolly Postman, published by Heinemann in 1986; Allan Ahlberg told The Guardian in 2006 that it had sold over six million copies. It made innovative use of envelopes to include letters, cards, games and a tiny book. According to one WorldCat library record, "A Jolly Postman delivers letters to several famous fairy-tale characters such as the Big Bad Wolf, Cinderella, and the Three Bears. Twelve of the pages have been made into six envelopes and contain eight letters and cards. Each letter may be removed from its envelope page and read separately." Its first-listed Library of Congress Subject Heading (US) is "Toy and movable books". The Jolly Postman required five years to make, and much discussion with Heinemann and the printer before it was issued in 1986. It won many awards including the Kurt Maschler Award for integrated writing and illustration. There were two sequels, The Jolly Christmas Postman (1991), for which Janet won her second Greenaway Medal, and The Jolly Pocket Postman (1995).

Working together, the Ahlbergs produced many popular books for a range of ages. Some, such as Peepo! and The Baby's Catalogue, are aimed at babies and toddlers. For older children, they wrote books such as Burglar Bill, Cops and Robbers, Funnybones and the Happy Families series. Allan also wrote two books of verses, Heard it in the Playground and Please, Mrs Butler, which Janet illustrated, and more text-heavy books such as Woof!.

Janet died of breast cancer on 15 November 1994, at the age of 50. Allan Ahlberg said with regret that they had "made an absolute fortune" but "never really had holidays".

Allan later married his editor, Vanessa Clarke of Walker Books, his new publisher. As of 2017, he was the author of more than 150 published books, including two in 2004 illustrated by his daughter Jessica, who now creates picture books with other writers such as Toon Tellegen. Father and daughter collaborated again, completing a movable picture book published late in 2012, The Goldilocks Variations (Walker), "a new twist in an old fairy tale".

Allan Ahlberg was a supporter of West Bromwich Albion, having grown up in the neighbouring town to West Bromwich. He died at age 87 on 29 July 2025. According to FOX59, unlike Janet Ahlberg, no cause of death was provided for Allan Ahlberg.

== Recognition ==
Besides the two Greenaway Medals, Janet Ahlberg was a "Commended" runner up three times, for Burglar Bill (1977), The Baby's Catalogue (1982), and The Jolly Postman (1986). (Note: Today there are usually eight books on the Greenaway shortlist. According to CCSU, some runners up through 2002 were Commended (from 1959) or Highly Commended (from 1974). There were 99 commendations of both kinds in 44 years, including two in 1977, two 1982, and six 1986.: No one has won three Greenaway Medals. Among the fourteen illustrators with two Medals, Janet Ahlberg is one of seven with one book named to the top ten (1955–2005) and one of six with at least three commendations (1959–2002).) According to Allan, their daughter Jessica inspired the last two, and his own "Burglar Bill" book is autobiographical, The Boyhood of Burglar Bill (Puffin, 2007). A football story set in war-ravaged England, Boyhood made the Guardian Children's Fiction Prize shortlist.

Allan Ahlberg appeared as a castaway on the BBC Radio programme Desert Island Discs on 14 November 2008. He described their work together, her illness and death, and the creation of Janet's Last Book.

From July to September 2011, the Ahlbergs' work was celebrated at The Public arts centre in Sandwell (which encompasses Allan's hometown Oldbury). The exhibition included works by schoolchildren with local artists "in response to" Ahlberg stories.

In July 2014, Allan Ahlberg declined the (inaugural) Booktrust Best Book Awards 'Lifetime Achievement Award' (which has a 5000 GBP prize attached). He cited ethical grounds related to the award's principal sponsor Amazon.com. In a letter to The Bookseller he stated that "Booktrust does good work and has a well-deserved reputation ... For my part, the idea that my "lifetime achievement" — i.e. the books (and all of Janet's work too) — should have the Amazon tag attached to it is unacceptable." He also sat on the Council of the Society of Authors.

== Selected works ==
=== By Janet and Allan Ahlberg ===
Bookseller World mentions about 80 "UK First Editions Books" by Janet and Allan. Five series comprise more than 40 books, none published by Kestrel or Viking; 35 singletons include eight published by Kestrel (a Viking imprint) from 1976 to 1983, and 12 published by Viking from 1984 to 1994.

- Brick Street Boys (Collins, 1975, ISBN 9780001380622) – five volumes
- The Old Joke Book (Kestrel, 1976, ISBN 9780670522736) – board book
- Burglar Bill (Heinemann, 1977, ISBN 9780434925001) – board book
- Jeremiah in the Dark Woods (Kestrel, 1977, ISBN 978-0722653579) – board book
- The Vanishment of Thomas Tull (Black, 1977, ISBN 9780684159683) – with dust jacket
- Cops and Robbers (Heinemann, 1978, ISBN 9780688841782)
- Each Peach Pear Plum (Kestrel, 1978, ISBN 9780590410816)
- The One and Only Two Heads (Collins, 1979, ISBN 978-0001380349)
- Son of a Gun (Heinemann, 1979, ISBN 9780140328103)
- The Little Worm Book (Granada, 1979, ISBN 9780246113252)
- Two Wheels Two Heads (Collins, 1979,ISBN 9780001380356)
- Funnybones (Heinemann, 1980, ISBN 9780141501611)
- A Pair of Sinners (Granada, 1980, ISBN 9780246113252)
- Happy Families (Puffin, 1980; a 14-book series)
- Peepo! (also released as Peek-A-Boo! in a US version) (Kestrel, 1981, ISBN 9780670803446)
- The Ha Ha Bonk Book (Kestrel, 1982, ISBN 9780140314120)
- Fast frog and friends: Help Your Child to Read Collection (Granada, 1982, OL 21209773M)
- The Baby's Catalogue (Kestrel, 1982, ISBN 9780140503852) (Note: The LCC record lists a 32-page book, The baby's catalogue, published by Little, Brown in 1982. It lists four 12-page books published by Little, Brown in 1998; copyright 1982; "Edition: 1st American Board Book ed."; "Series: The baby's catalogue". For instance: "Baby sleeps" (1998). LCC record. Retrieved 2012-11-14.)
- Ten in a Bed (Granada, 1983, ISBN 9780140325317)
- Please Mrs Butler (Kestrel, 1983, OCLC 1036777872)
- Daisy Chains series (Heinemann/Egmont, 1983)
  - Which Witch? (ISBN 9780434925070)
  - Ready Teddy Go! (ISBN 9780434925063)
- Yum Yum (Viking, 1984, ISBN 9780670800704)
- Playmates, a slot book (Viking, 1984, ISBN 9780670800711)
- Zoo: Foldaway Books (Viking, 1984, ISBN 9780517655078)
- Happy Worms (Red Nose Readers) (Walker, 1985, ISBN 9780744502565)
- Woof! (Viking, 1986, ISBN 9780140386691)
- The Cinderella Show (Viking, 1986, ISBN 0670810371)
- The Jolly Postman (Heinemann, 1986, OCLC 59229153)
- The Clothes Horse and Other Stories (Viking, 1987, ISBN 9780670812677)
- The Mighty Slide (Viking, 1988, ISBN 9780140323351)
- Starting School (Viking, 1988, ISBN 9780670821754)
- Heard it in the Playground (Viking, 1989, ISBN 9780140328240)
- Bye Bye Baby (Heinemann, 1989, ISBN 9780434925261)
- The Jolly Christmas Postman (Heinemann, 1991, ISBN 9780316020336)
- The Bear Nobody Wanted (Viking, 1992, ISBN 9780670839827)
- Mrs. Butler Songbook (Viking, 1992, ISBN 9780670832354)
- It was a dark and stormy night (Viking, 1993, ISBN 9780140545869)
- The Giant Baby (Viking, 1994, ISBN 9780140363807)
- The Jolly Pocket Postman (1995, ISBN 9780670886265)

The Baby's Catalogue series, American Board Book editions, copyright 1982

- Baby Sleeps (1998, ISBN 9780316038454)
- Blue Buggy (1998, ISBN 9780316038485)
- Blue Pram (1998, ISBN 9780670879519)
- Doll and Teddy (1998, ISBN 9780316038461)
- See the Rabbit (1998, ISBN 9780670879526)

=== Written by Allan Ahlberg ===
Most of these books were illustrated by other people, except My Brother's Ghost.

- Mr. Cosmo the Conjuror (1980, ISBN 9780140312379)
- Please Mrs. Butler (1983, ISBN 9780141314587)
- Woof! (1986, illustrated by Fritz Wegner, ISBN 9780670808328)
- The Cinderella Show (1986, ISBN 9780141380940)
- Heard it in the Playground (1989, illustrated by Fritz Wegner, ISBN 9780140328240)
- The Giant Baby (1994, illustrated by Fritz Wegner, ISBN 9780140363807)
- The Better Brown Stories (1995, illustrated by Fritz Wegner, ISBN 9780140390001)
- The Night Train (1996, ISBN 9780146003288)
- Janet's Last Book (1997, ISBN 9780140268720)
- The Snail House (2000, ISBN 9780744561647)
- Friendly Matches (2001, ISBN 9780141942445)
- My Brother's Ghost (2001, ISBN 9780141928067)
- The Man Who Wore All His Clothes (2001, ISBN 9781844281299)
- The Adventures of Bert (2001, illustrated by Raymond Briggs, ISBN 9780670893294)
- The Woman Who Won Things (2002, ISBN 9781844281305)
- The Improbable Cat (2002, ISBN 9780141314907)
- A Bit More Bert (2002, illustrated by Raymond Briggs, ISBN 9780670893317)
- Half a Pig (2004, illustrated by Jessica Ahlberg, ISBN 9780763623739)
- The Boy, the Wolf, the Sheep and the Lettuce: A Little Search for Truth??? (2004, illustrated by Jessica Ahlberg, ISBN 9780141928050)
- The Runaway Dinner (2006, ISBN 9780763631420)
- The Boyhood of Burglar Bill (2007, ISBN 9780141382845) – autobiographical post-war football story
- Previously (2007, ISBN 9780763653040)
- The Pencil (2008, ISBN 9781536400007)
- The Baby in the Hat (2008, ISBN 9780763639587)
- Everybody Was a Baby Once and Other Poems (2010, ISBN 9781406330007)
- Goldilocks Variations (2012, illus. Jessica Ahlberg)
- Hooray for Bread (2014, ISBN 9780763663117)

=== By Janet and Allan Ahlberg in French ===
- Le livre de tous les écoliers (Gallimard Jeunesse, 2002, ISBN 9782070548552)

== See also ==
- Pop-up book
- Toy book
