= Shakespeare Theatre Company production history =

The Shakespeare Theatre Company is a regional theatre company in Washington, D.C., United States. The theatre company focuses primarily on plays from the Shakespeare canon, but its seasons include works by other classic playwrights such as Euripides, Henrik Ibsen and Oscar Wilde.

The following is a chronological list of the productions that have been staged since its inception.

== 1986–1987 ==
- Romeo and Juliet – by William Shakespeare
- La Mandragola – by Niccolò Machiavelli
- The Winter's Tale – by William Shakespeare
- Love's Labour's Lost – by William Shakespeare

== 1987–1988 ==
- The Witch of Edmonton – by William Rowley, Thomas Dekker and John Ford
- All's Well That Ends Well – by William Shakespeare
- Macbeth – by William Shakespeare
- The Merchant of Venice – by William Shakespeare

== 1988–1989 ==
- Antony and Cleopatra – by William Shakespeare
- Richard II – by William Shakespeare
- The Beggar's Opera – by John Gay
- As You Like It – by William Shakespeare

== 1989–1990 ==
- Twelfth Night – by William Shakespeare
- The Tempest – by William Shakespeare
- Mary Stuart – by Friedrich von Schiller
- The Merry Wives of Windsor – by William Shakespeare

== 1990–1991 ==
- Richard III – by William Shakespeare
- Othello – by William Shakespeare
- Fuente Ovejuna – by Lope de Vega
- King Lear – by William Shakespeare
- The Merry Wives of Windsor – by William Shakespeare

== 1991–1992 ==
- Coriolanus – by William Shakespeare
- Saint Joan – by George Bernard Shaw
- Much Ado About Nothing – by William Shakespeare
- Measure for Measure – by William Shakespeare
- As You Like It – by William Shakespeare

== 1992–1993 ==
- Troilus and Cressida – by William Shakespeare
- Hamlet – by William Shakespeare
- The Comedy of Errors – by William Shakespeare
- Mother Courage and Her Children – by Bertolt Brecht
- Much Ado About Nothing – by William Shakespeare

== 1993–1994 ==
- Richard II – by William Shakespeare
- Julius Caesar – by William Shakespeare
- Romeo and Juliet – by William Shakespeare
- The Doctor's Dilemma – by George Bernard Shaw
- The Comedy of Errors – by William Shakespeare

== 1994–1995 ==
- Henry IV, part 1 – by William Shakespeare
- Henry IV, part 2 – by William Shakespeare
- The School for Scandal – by Richard Brinsley Sheridan
- Love's Labour's Lost – by William Shakespeare
- The Taming of the Shrew – by William Shakespeare
- Twelfth Night – by William Shakespeare

== 1995–1996 ==
- Macbeth – by William Shakespeare
- Henry V – by William Shakespeare
- All's Well That Ends Well – by William Shakespeare
- Volpone – by Ben Jonson
- Measure for Measure – by William Shakespeare

== 1996–1997 ==
- Henry VI, part 1 – by William Shakespeare
- Henry VI, part 2 – by William Shakespeare
- Henry VI, part 3 – by William Shakespeare
- Antony and Cleopatra – by William Shakespeare
- As You Like It – by William Shakespeare
- Mourning Becomes Electra – by Eugene O'Neill
- Henry V – by William Shakespeare

== 1997–1998 ==
- The Tempest – by William Shakespeare
- Othello – by William Shakespeare
- Peer Gynt – by Henrik Ibsen
- The Merry Wives of Windsor – by William Shakespeare
- Sweet Bird of Youth – by Tennessee Williams
- All's Well That Ends Well – by William Shakespeare

== 1998–1999 ==
- A Woman of No Importance – by Oscar Wilde
- Twelfth Night – by William Shakespeare
- King John – by William Shakespeare
- The Trojan Women – by Euripides
- The Merchant of Venice – by William Shakespeare
- The Merry Wives of Windsor – by William Shakespeare

== 1999–2000 ==
- King Lear – by William Shakespeare
- A Midsummer Night's Dream – by William Shakespeare
- Coriolanus – by William Shakespeare
- The Country Wife – by William Wycherley
- Camino Real – by Tennessee Williams
- The Merchant of Venice – by William Shakespeare

== 2000–2001 ==
- Timon of Athens – by William Shakespeare
- Richard II – by William Shakespeare
- Don Carlos – by Friedrich Schiller
- The Two Gentlemen of Verona – by William Shakespeare
- Hedda Gabler – by Henrik Ibsen
- King Lear – by William Shakespeare

== 2001–2002 ==
- Oedipus the King – by Sophocles
- Oedipus at Colonus – by Sophocles
- Antigone – by Sophocles
- Hamlet – by William Shakespeare
- The Duchess of Malfi – by John Webster
- Romeo and Juliet – by William Shakespeare
- The Little Foxes – by Lillian Hellman
- The Two Gentlemen of Verona – by William Shakespeare

== 2002–2003 ==
- The Winter's Tale – by William Shakespeare
- Much Ado about Nothing – by William Shakespeare
- The Silent Woman – by Ben Jonson
- Richard III – by William Shakespeare
- Ghosts – by Henrik Ibsen
- Hamlet – by William Shakespeare

== 2003–2004 ==
- The Rivals – by Richard Brinsley Sheridan
- A Midsummer Night's Dream – by William Shakespeare
- Henry IV, part 1 – by William Shakespeare
- Henry IV, part 2 – by William Shakespeare
- Five by Tenn – by Tennessee Williams
- Cyrano de Bergerac – by Edmond Rostand
- Much Ado about Nothing – by William Shakespeare

== 2004–2005 ==
- Macbeth – by William Shakespeare
- Pericles – by William Shakespeare
- Lorenzaccio – by Alfred de Musset
- The Tempest – by William Shakespeare
- Lady Windermere's Fan – by Oscar Wilde
- A Midsummer Night's Dream – by William Shakespeare

== 2005–2006 ==
- Othello – by William Shakespeare
- The Comedy of Errors – by William Shakespeare
- Don Juan – by Molière
- The Persians – by Aeschylus
- Love's Labour's Lost – by William Shakespeare
- Pericles – by William Shakespeare

== 2006–2007 ==
- An Enemy of the People – by Henrik Ibsen
- The Beaux' Stratagem – by George Farquhar
- Richard III – by William Shakespeare
- Titus Andronicus – by William Shakespeare
- Hamlet – by William Shakespeare
- Love's Labour's Lost – by William Shakespeare

== 2007–2008 ==
- The Taming of the Shrew – by William Shakespeare
- Edward II – by Christopher Marlowe
- Tamburlaine – by Christopher Marlowe
- On the Eve of Friday Morning – by Norman Allen
- Argonautika – by Mary Zimmerman
- Major Barbara – by George Bernard Shaw
- Antony and Cleopatra – by William Shakespeare
- Julius Caesar – by William Shakespeare
- The Imaginary Invalid – by Molière

== 2008–2009 ==
- Romeo and Juliet – by William Shakespeare
- The Way of the World – by William Congreve
- Twelfth Night – by William Shakespeare
- The Dog in the Manger – by Lope de Vega
- Ion – by Euripides
- Design for Living – by Noël Coward
- King Lear – by William Shakespeare

== 2009–2010 ==
Fully staged productions

- The Alchemist – by Ben Jonson
- As You Like It – by William Shakespeare
- Richard II – by William Shakespeare
- Henry V – by William Shakespeare
- The Liar – by Pierre Corneille
- Mrs. Warren's Profession – by George Bernard Shaw

Shakespeare Theatre Company Presentations

- Phèdre – by Jean Racine featuring Helen Mirren produced by The Royal National Theatre (Great Britain)

- Aurélia's Oratorio – starring Aurélia Thierée, conceived and directed by Victoria Thierée-Chaplin, produced by ArKtype / Thomas O. Kriegsmann

== 2010–2011 ==
Fully staged productions

- All's Well That Ends Well – by William Shakespeare
- Candide – by Leonard Bernstein based on the novella by Voltaire
- Cymbeline – by William Shakespeare
- An Ideal Husband – by Oscar Wilde
- Old Times – by Harold Pinter
- The Merchant of Venice – by William Shakespeare

Shakespeare Theatre Company Presentations

- The Great Game: Afghanistan' short plays by many authors – produced by the Tricycle Theatre in London
- Black Watch, by Gregory Burke – produced by National Theatre of Scotland

== 2011–2012 ==
Fully staged productions

- The Heir Apparent – by Jean-François Regnard and translated by David Ives
- Much Ado About Nothing – by William Shakespeare
- The Two Gentlemen of Verona – by William Shakespeare
- Strange Interlude – by Eugene O'Neill
- The Servant of Two Masters – by Carlo Goldoni
- The Merry Wives of Windsor – by William Shakespeare

Musical in Concert series

- The Boys from Syracuse – by Richard Rodgers, Lorenz Hart and George Abbott
- Two Gentlemen of Verona, A Rock Opera – by John Guare, Mel Shapiro and Galt MacDermot

Shakespeare Theatre Company Presentations

- Fela! Directed & Choreographed by Bill T. Jones, Produced by Jay-Z, Will Smith & Jada Pinkett Smith
- Krapp's Last Tape – by Samuel Beckett featuring John Hurt from Ireland's Gate Theatre

== 2012–2013 ==
Fully staged productions

- The Government Inspector – by Nikolai Gogol adapted by Jeffrey Hatcher
- A Midsummer Night's Dream – by William Shakespeare
- Hughie – by Eugene O'Neill
- Coriolanus – by William Shakespeare
- Wallenstein – by Friedrich Schiller adapted by Robert Pinsky
- The Winter's Tale – by William Shakespeare

Shakespeare Theatre Company Presentations

- Black Watch – by Gregory Burke – produced by National Theatre of Scotland
- The Strange Undoing of Prudencia Hart – created by David Greig and Wils Wilson – produced by National Theatre of Scotland
- Les Liaisons Dangereuses – by Pierre Choderlos de Laclos, directed by John Malkovich
- Fela! Directed & Choreographed by Bill T. Jones, Produced by Jay-Z, Will Smith & Jada Pinkett Smith

== 2013–2014 ==
Fully staged productions

- Measure for Measure – by William Shakespeare
- A Funny Thing Happened on the Way to the Forum – music & lyrics by Stephen Sondheim book by Burt Shevelove & Larry Gelbart
- The Importance of Being Earnest – by Oscar Wilde
- Henry IV, Parts 1 and 2 – by William Shakespeare staged in revolving repertory
- Private Lives – by Noël Coward

Shakespeare Theatre Company Presentations

- Potted Potter – The Unauthorized Harry Experience – A Parody by Daniel Clarkson and Jefferson Turner
- Mies Julie by Yael Farber based on Miss Julie by August Strindberg produced by the Baxter Theatre Centre at the University of Cape Town in association with South African Theatre Association.
- Man in a Case Adapted from The Man in a Case & About Love by Anton Chekhov Featuring Mikhail Baryshnikov Produced by Baryshnikov Productions and ArKtype/Thomas O. Kriegsmann
- Brief Encounter, by Emma Rice, based on the 1945 movie Brief Encounter and Still Life by Noël Coward produced by the Kneehigh Theatre

== 2014–2015 ==
Fully staged productions

- As You Like It – by William Shakespeare
- The Tempest – by William Shakespeare
- The Metromaniacs – by Alexis Piron, translated by David Ives
- Man of La Mancha – book by Dale Wasserman, lyrics by Joe Darion and music by Mitch Leigh
- Tartuffe – by Molière

Shakespeare Theatre Company Presentations

- The Magic Flute – Impempe Yomlingo – adapted from Mozart's The Magic Flute by the Isango Ensemble Repertory
- Venus and Adonis – adapted from the Shakespeare poem by the Isango Ensemble Repertory
- ^{*}Dunsinane by David Greig by the National Theatre of Scotland and Royal Shakespeare Company

^{*} Part of the 2014–15 subscription series

== 2015–2016 ==
Fully staged productions

- Salomé – adapted by Yaël Farber
- Kiss Me, Kate – music and lyrics by Cole Porter and book by Samuel and Bella Spewack
- The Critic – by Richard Brinsley Sheridan and adapted by Jeffrey Hatcher and The Real Inspector Hound by Tom Stoppard
- Othello – by William Shakespeare
- 1984 – by George Orwell and adapted by Robert Icke and Duncan Macmillan
- The Taming of the Shrew – by William Shakespeare

== 2016–2017 ==
Fully staged productions

- Romeo and Juliet – by William Shakespeare
- The Secret Garden – by Marsha Norman and Lucy Simon and based on the novel by Frances Hodgson Burnett
- King Charles III – by Mike Bartlett
- The Select (The Sun Also Rises) – adapted by Elevator Repair Service, based on a novel by Ernest Hemingway
- Macbeth – by William Shakespeare
- The School for Lies – adapted by David Ives and based on a play by Molière

== 2017–2018 ==
Fully staged productions

- The Lover and The Collection – by Harold Pinter
- Twelfth Night – by William Shakespeare
- Hamlet – by William Shakespeare
- Noura – by Heather Raffo
- Waiting for Godot – by Samuel Beckett and created by Druid
- Camelot – book and lyrics by Alan Jay Lerner and music by Frederick Loewe

== 2018–2019 ==
Michael Kahn's last season with STC. Marketed as the "Grand Finale Season."

Fully staged productions

- The Comedy of Errors – by William Shakespeare, directed by Alan Paul
- An Inspector Calls – by J. B. Priestley, directed by Stephen Daldry
- The Panties, the Partner, and the Profit: Scenes from the life of the Heroic Middle Class – by David Ives, inspired by the work of Carl Sternheim, directed by Michael Kahn
- Richard III (play) – by William Shakespeare, directed by David Muse
- Vanity Fair – by Kate Hamill, adapted from the novel by William Makepeace Thackeray, directed by Jessica Stone
- The Oresteia – by Ellen McLaughlin, adapted from Aeschylus, directed by Michael Kahn

== 2019–2020 ==
Simon Godwin’s first season as Artistic Director. Canceled mid-way due to the COVID-19 pandemic.

Fully Staged Productions

- Everybody – by Branden Jacobs-Jenkins, directed by Will Davis
- Peter Pan and Wendy – by J. M. Barrie, adapted by Lauren Gunderson, directed by Alan Paul
- The Woman in Black – by Susan Hill, adapted by Stephen Mallatratt, directed by Robin Herford

Closed Early

- The Amen Corner – by James Baldwin, directed by Whitney White
- Timon of Athens – by William Shakespeare, directed by Simon Godwin

Canceled

- Romantics Anonymous – book by Emma Rice, lyrics by Christopher Dimond, music by Michael Kooman, directed by Emma Rice, based on the film Les Émotifs Anonymes
- Much Ado About Nothing by William Shakespeare, directed by Simon Godwin

== 2020–2021 ==
Lockdown Season

- All the Devils Are Here: How Shakespeare Invented the Villain – by Patrick Page, directed by Alan Paul – not presented live, but filmed at Harman Hall and streamed for audiences.
- Blindness – based on the novel by José Saramago, adapted by Simon Stephens, directed by Walter Meierjohann

== 2021–2022 ==
First season of fully staged productions after the Covid-19 lockdown. Marketed as the "Play On" season.

- The Amen Corner – by James Baldwin, directed by Whitney White (remount of 2020 production)
- Remember This: The Lesson of Jan Karski – by Clark Young and Derek Goldman, directed by Derek Goldman
- Once Upon a One More Time – with the music of Britney Spears, written by Jon Hartmere, directed and choreographed by Keone and Mari Madrid
- The Merchant of Venice – by William Shakespeare directed by Arin Arbus
- Our Town – by Thornton Wilder directed by Alan Paul
- Red Velvet – by Lolita Chakrabarti directed by Jade King Carroll

== 2022–2023 ==
Fully staged productions
- The Notebooks of Leonardo da Vinci – written and directed by Mary Zimmerman
- Much Ado About Nothing – by William Shakespeare, directed by Simon Godwin
- Jane Anger – by Talene Monahon directed by Jess Chayes
- King Lear – by William Shakespeare directed by Simon Godwin
- The Jungle – by Joe Murphy and Joe Robertson, directed by Stephen Daldry and Justin Martin
- Here There Are Blueberries – written by Moisés Kaufman and Amanda Gronich, conceived and directed by Moisés Kaufman

== 2023–2024 ==
Fully staged productions. Marketed as the "Greater Wonders" season.
- Evita – by Tim Rice & Andrew Lloyd Webber directed by Sammi Cannold
- Macbeth in Stride – by Whitney White Choreographed by Raja Feather Kelly, directed by Tyler Dobrowsky & Taibi Magar
- As You Like It – conceived and directed by Daryl Cloran
- The Lehman Trilogy – by Stefano Massini & Ben Power directed by Arin Arbus
- Macbeth – by William Shakespeare directed by Simon Godwin, starring Ralph Fiennes and Indira Varma
- The Matchbox Magic Flute – adapted and directed by Mary Zimmerman

== 2024–2025 ==
Fully staged productions
- Comedy of Errors – by William Shakespeare directed by Simon Godwin
- Babbitt (novel) – by Joe DiPietro directed by Christopher Ashley, starring Matthew Broderick
- Leopoldstadt (play) – by Tom Stoppard directed by Carey Perloff
- Kunene and the King – by John Kani directed by Ruben Santiago Hudson
- Uncle Vanya – by Anton Chekhov directed by Simon Godwin, starring Hugh Bonneville
- Frankenstein – written and directed by Emily Burns

Special Event

- All the Devils Are Here: How Shakespeare Invented the Villain – by Patrick Page, directed by Simon Godwin – presented live at the Klein Theatre, starring Patrick Page.

== 2025–2026 ==
Fully staged productions
- Merry Wives – by William Shakespeare, adapted by Jocelyn Bioh, directed by Taylor Reynolds
- The Wild Duck – by Henrik Ibsen, adapted by David Eldridge, directed by Simon Godwin
- Guys and Dolls – Based on a Story and Characters of Damon Runyon, Music and Lyrics by Frank Loesser, Book by Jo Swerling and Abe Burrows, Choreographed by Joshua Bergasse, directed by Francesca Zambello
- On Beckett – written and performed by Bill Irwin
- Hamnet – by Lolita Chakrabarti, directed by Erica Whyman
- Othello – by William Shakespeare, directed by Simon Godwin, starring Wendell Pierce

Special Events

- Paranormal Activity – Written by Levi Holloway, Directed by Felix Barrett, Restaged by Levi Holloway
- The Tragedy of Hamlet – Performed by Eddie Izzard

== 2026–2027 ==
Fully staged productions
- The Score – by Oliver Cotton, directed by Trevor Nunn, starring Brian Cox
- Frida...A Self Portrait – Written and Performed by Vanessa Severo, directed by Joanie Schultz
- A Midsummer Night's Dream – by William Shakespeare, directed by Simon Godwin, puppets by Basil Twist
- A Raisin in the Sun – by Lorraine Hansberry directed by Tim Bond
- Romeo and Juliet – by William Shakespeare, directed by Jess Chayes
- Follies – Book by James Goldman, Music & Lyrics by Stephen Sondheim, directed by Matthew Gardiner
