= Michael Kooman =

American musician

Michael Kooman is an Emmy nominated composer writing for the stage and screen. His television work includes songs on the Disney Junior animated series, Vampirina and the Netflix series Ridley Jones.* He is most known for his musical Romantics Anonymous (written with Emma Rice), which premiered in 2017 at Shakespeare's Globe Theatre in London. He is half of the writing team of Kooman and Dimond.

== Works ==
=== Vampirina ===
Kooman and Dimond are the primary songwriters for the Disney Junior series Vampirina, and were nominated for a 2020 Emmy for their work on the show. Following the story of a family of vampires as they move from Transylvania to Pennsylvania, the series features Isabella Crovetti, James Van Der Beek, Lauren Graham, Wanda Sykes, Patti Lupone, and Brian Stokes Mitchell. Notable Broadway guest stars include Andrew Rannells and Christian Borle. By the end of the show's thirds season he's written over 150 songs for the series.

=== Romantics Anonymous ===
With a book by acclaimed British writer/director Emma Rice, Romantics Anonymous was adapted from the 2010 French-Belgian film of the same name. The show premiered to great acclaim in 2017 at Shakespeare's Globe. The Guardian hailed it as "A multifaceted gem, chic-full of love, generosity and joy" and Variety raved "Kooman's score and Dimond's lyrics soar to emotional heights". The show planned to tour internationally in 2020.

=== Ridley Jones ===
Continuing his collaboration with creator and executive producer Chris Nee, he began work writing songs for the Netflix series Ridley Jones.

=== The Noteworthy Life of Howard Barnes ===
The Noteworthy Life of Howard Barnes, a musical comedy which chronicles the tale of an average man who wakes up one morning to discover that his life has become a musical, was first workshopped at the prestigious Eugene O'Neill Theater Center in 2013, followed by workshops at the Human Race Theatre Company and Village Theatre. In 2014 Village Theatre produced a workshop production of the piece.

The show received its world premiere at Village Theatre in the fall of 2018, with the Seattle Times giving it a rave, calling it "uproariously funny". A world premiere recording was released in 2019. *

=== Dani Girl ===
Kooman and Dimond's first book musical, Dani Girl, has been work-shopped at Carnegie Mellon University, Pennsylvania State University, the American Conservatory Theater, The Kennedy Center, The ASCAP/Disney Musical Theater Workshop, and CAP-21. The piece is licensed by Samuel French. Its professional premiere was produced in Barrie, Ontario by Talk is Free Theatre, directed by Richard Ouzounian, and subsequently was remounted in 2012.Harvest Rain Theatre Company debuted the show internationally in Brisbane, Australia in 2010. The show was presented at the 2011 National Alliance for Musical Theater Festival of New Musicals and by Maryland's Unexpected Stage Company (Summer 2014). Dani Girl made its UK amateur premiere in Glasgow, Scotland by Epilogue Theatre.

=== Orphie and the Book of Heroes ===
Orphie and the Book of Heroes was commissioned by The Kennedy Center and premiered in 2014. The Washington Post gave the show 5 stars and called it "An Epic Success". It has subsequently been produced at Orlando Family Stage, Front Porch Theatre, and Interlochen Arts Academy. An album of the score was released in 2018.

=== Judge Jackie: Disorder in the Court ===
Judge Jackie: Disorder in the Court is an audience participation based musical commissioned by the Pittsburgh Civic Light Opera which ran for 14 weeks at their cabaret space in downtown Pittsburgh in 2014. Reviews were positive, and the Pittsburgh Post-Gazette raved "Musical comedy justice is served in a new CLO Cabaret show featuring catchy tunes, clever lyrics, juicy characters and important roles for audience members throughout the proceedings.”

=== Golden Gate ===
Golden Gate premiered at the Williamstown Theater Festival Aug 12, 2009. It has subsequently been workshopped as part of Millikin University's New Musicals Workshop, culminating in a production of the latest incarnation of the show, which occurred in the spring of 2011.

=== Someday Soon ===
In 2012, Kooman and Dimond collaborated with director Alberto Belli to create the musical short film Someday Soon, which was subsequently featured on Funny or Die.

=== Homemade Fusion ===
Their first collaboration was the song cycle Homemade Fusion in March 2006. Since the premiere, Homemade Fusion has been performed across the country as well as internationally. The show debuted at Carnegie Mellon University in 2006, with a subsequent production at the Pittsburgh CLO Cabaret Theater. This production featured Tony Award winner Patina Miller, Kara Lindsay, Anderson Davis, Andrew Kober, and many other Carnegie Mellon Drama School Alumni. In 2010, the show was performed at the Ambassadors theater in London. Songs from "Homemade Fusion" have amassed more than a million views on their YouTube channel. Part of the show was performed by the writers in 2009 at The Kennedy Center's "Next Generation of Musical Theater" series.

== Awards ==
Along with Christopher Dimond, he received the $50,000 2013 Fred Ebb Award as well as the 2010 Jonathan Larson Grant. In 2011, they were awarded the first Lorenz Hart Award, given by the ASCAP Foundation. In 2009, he received the Burton Lane Award from the American Theatre Hall of Fame, and received a fellowship from both the Dramatists Guild of America as well as the O'neill Musical Theatre Festival.

He has completed the advanced BMI Lehman Engel Musical Theater Workshop and is currently a member of the Dramatists Guild of America.

== Album ==
On June 28, 2011, Kooman released "Out of Our Heads: The Music of Kooman and Dimond". The album features several Tony nominated performers including Patina Miller, Kerry Butler, and Christopher Sieber. The album release party was held at Birdland on July 18, 2011 featuring performances by Laura Osnes, Julia Murney, Jeremy Jordan, Kyle Dean Massey, and Jose Llana.

== Additional Sources ==
- https://www.goldderby.com/article/2020/daytime-emmy-nominations-list-of-nominees/
- http://koomandimond.com/biography.html
- https://www.seattletimes.com/entertainment/theater/an-ordinary-man-is-trapped-in-a-musical-in-village-theatres-hilarious-the-noteworthy-life-of-howard-barnes/
- http://www.kennedy-center.org/programs/millennium/artist_detail.cfm?artist_id=KOOMANMCHL
- http://broadwayworld.com/article/Photo-Coverage-ASCAP-Foundation-Honors-Stephen-Schwartz-with-Richard-Rodgers-Award-20111208
- http://broadwayworld.com/article/Photo-Coverage-Patina-Miller-Laura-Osnes-Jeremy-Jordan-More-Sing-the-Music-of-Kooman-Dimond-at-Birdland-20110719
- https://www.youtube.com/watch?v=PbbewRSc-C0
