= Carly Bawden =

English stage actress

- Born: 1988 (age 37–38)
- Education: Guildford School of Acting
- Years active: 2009–present
- Partner: Harry Hepple

Carly Lucinda A Bawden (born 1988) is an English actress. She is known for her work in theatre.

== Early life ==
Bawden grew up on a farm in Milverton, Somerset near Taunton. She has an older sister and younger brother.

Bawden attended Wellington School, where she was a member of Gillard's. She joined the school's chapel choir, which included performing for the Pope. Bawden went on to graduate from the Guildford School of Acting in 2009.

== Career ==
Upon graduating from drama school in 2009, Bawden was cast as the Mistress in the Evita tour, arranged by Bill Kenwright. For her performance, Bawden was nominated for Best Performance in a Supporting Rolein a Musical at the TMA Theatre Awards. She then played Swallow in Kenwright's tour of Whistle Down the Wind. She also starred opposite Oliver Savile in Sleeping Beauty at the Theatre Royal, Wakefield.

In 2011, Bawden made her West End debut starring as Geneviève Émery in The Umbrellas of Cherbourg directed by Emma Rice at the Gielgud Theatre. She also played Catherine in Pippin at the Menier Chocolate Factory. The following year, she played Susan Pevensie in Rupert Goold's adaptation of The Lion, the Witch and the Wardrobe in Kensington Gardens and starred as Eliza Doolittle opposite Dominic West in My Fair Lady at the Sheffield Crucible.

Bawden returned to the Menier Chocolate Factory in 2014 for Assassins, that she starred as Lynette Fromme. In 2015, Bawden took over the role of Dahlia from Dianna Agron for the West End run of the play McQueen at the Theatre Royal, Haymarket and starred as Alice in Damon Albarn and Moira Buffini's musical Wonder.land. Bawden made her television debut in 2016 with a guest appearance in the BBC One medical soap opera Doctors and a recurring role as Ruth in the BBC Two period drama Close to the Enemy.

In 2017, Bawden originated the role of Angélique in the musical Romantics Anonymous, reuniting with Emma Rice, and played Maria in Twelfth Night, both at the Globe Theatre. She would later reprise her role in the former at the Bristol Old Vic in 2020. In the interim, Bawden played Clementine in the musical Sylvia at London's Old Vic in 2018 and Rose Red in Ghost Quartet at the Boulevard Theatre in 2019.

Bawden starred as Julie in the 2021 London revival of Carousel at Regent's Park Open Air Theatre. She had a role as Anna in the 2023 musical adaptation of Rock Follies at the Minerva Theatre, Chichester.

== Personal life ==
Bawden is in a relationship with actor Harry Hepple.

== Filmography ==
Year	Title	Role	Notes
2016	Doctors	Beth Mallinder	Episode: "Chromatic"
2016	Close to the Enemy	Ruth	Miniseries, 5 episodes
2020	Call the Midwife	Laverne Bulmer	1 episode
2022	This England	Jo Green	1 episode

== Stage ==
Year	Title	Role	Notes
2009	Evita	Mistress	UK tour
2010	Whistle Down the Wind	Swallow	UK and Ireland tour
2010	Sleeping Beauty	Princess	Theatre Royal, Wakefield
2011	The Umbrellas of Cherbourg	Geneviève Émery	Gielgud Theatre, London
2011	Pippin	Catherine	Menier Chocolate Factory, London
2012	The Lion, the Witch and the Wardrobe	Susan Pevensie	Kensington Gardens, London
2012	My Fair Lady	Eliza Doolittle	Crucible Theatre, Sheffield
2013	Tristan & Yseult	Whitehands (narrator)	Kneehigh Theatre Tour
2014	Dead Dog in a Suitcase	Polly	Kneehigh Theatre Tour
2014	Assassins	Lynette Fromme	Menier Chocolate Factory, London
2015	McQueen	Dahlia	Theatre Royal, Haymarket, London
2015	Wonder.land	Alice	National Theatre, London
2017	Twelfth Night	Maria	Globe Theatre, London
2017, 2020	Romantics Anonymous	Angélique	Globe Theatre, London / Bristol Old Vic
2018	Sylvia	Clementine	Old Vic, London
2019	Ghost Quartet	Rose Red	Boulevard Theatre, London
2021	Carousel	Julie	Regent's Park Open Air Theatre, London
2023	Rock Follies	Anna	Minerva Theatre, Chichester
2026	A Christmas Carol	Belle	Old Vic, London

== Awards and nominations ==
Year	Award	Category	Work	Result	Ref.
2010	TMA Theatre Awards	Best Performance in a Supporting Rolein a Musical	Evita	Nominated	
2020	Offie	Performance Ensemble	Ghost Quartet	Nominated	(Note: Shared with Maimuna Memon, Niccolò Curradi and Zubin Varla.)
