= A Matter of Life and Death (play) =

A Matter of Life and Death is a stage adaptation by Tom Morris and Emma Rice of Powell and Pressburger's 1946 film of the same name for the company Kneehigh Theatre. Its first run at the National Theatre lasted from 3 May 2007 to 21 June 2007.

== Cast & crew ==
Taken from the programme of the performance at the Olivier Theatre, London, 12 May 2007.

=== Production team ===
- Director: Emma Rice
- Set Designer: Bill Mitchell
- Costume Designer: Vicki Mortimer
- Lighting Designer: Mark Henderson
- Choreographer: Debra Batton & Emma Rice
- Music: Stu Barker
- Sound Designer: Gareth Fry
- Projection Designers: Jon Driscoll & Gemma Carrington

=== Cast ===
On Earth
Peter	Tristan Sturrock
June	Lyndsey Marshal
Bob	Craig Johnson
Girl	Debbie Korley
Frank	Douglas Hodge
Dr McEwan	Andy Williams
Mr Archer	Chiké Okonkwo
Harold	Mike Shepherd
Between Life and Death
Boy	Dan Canham
Woman	Dorothy Atkinson
Nurse	Fiona Chivers
Nurse	Meryl Fernandes
Nurse	Lorraine Stewart
Nurse	Kirsty Woodward
Patient	Jamie Bradley
Patient	Thomas Goodridge
Patient	Pieter Lawman
Patient	Róbert Luckay
In the Other World
Conductor 71	Gisli Örn Gardarsson
Chief Recorder	Tamzin Griffin
First Prosecutor	Stuart McLoughlin
All other parts played by members of the Company
Musician	Stu Barker
Musician	Pete Judge
Musician	Dominic Lawton
Musician	Alex Vann
Musician	Michael Vince

== Differences from the film ==
Though the plot of the adaptation was broadly similar, there are some differences. In the play June, the radio operator, with whom Peter falls in love, was British rather than American, since the company "felt that it would distract attention from the central story and towards the different issues of Anglo-American relations today". However, this meant that the courtroom scenes could not include the arguments about Britain, its historical place in world events and how it is perceived by the rest of the world, and had to be replaced with different arguments about war and the effects of war. For the denouement, Peter's fate was decided by the toss of a coin, rather than by June's offer to change places with him; the end thus varied from performance to performance.

== Production ==
The production itself included many coups de theatre to represent things like the camera obscura, the table tennis game frozen in time and the Stairway to Heaven.

Most of the major reviewers seem to have seen it on a night when the toss of the coin determined that Peter would die. This does tend to negate much of what has gone before, all of his struggles to stay alive. Those that saw it on a night when Peter lived usually give a more positive report.

== Controversy ==
Though individual assessments varied from Nicholas de Jongh's wholly negative account in the Evening Standard to Susannah Clapp's enthusiastic review in The Observer, critical reaction to the play was generally poor. This prompted an attack by National Theatre director Nicholas Hytner on the major London critics, whom he described as "dead white men". His charges of misogyny and prejudice against female directors and new styles of theatre were hotly rebutted by his targets.

== Other productions ==
A production was staged at The Space, an arts and community centre on the Isle of Dogs in London, from 14 to 16 June 2012.
