= Romantics Anonymous (musical) =

2017 musical

- Music: Michael Kooman
- Lyrics: Christopher Dimond
- Book: Emma Rice
- Basis: Les Émotifs Anonymes by Jean-Pierre Améris; Philippe Blasband
- Premiere: 20 October 2017: Sam Wanamaker Playhouse, London
- Productions: 2017 London; 2020 Bristol; 2020 COVID-19 live stream 2026 Tokyo

Romantics Anonymous is a musical with music by Michael Kooman, lyrics by Christopher Dimond and a book by Emma Rice. It is based on the 2010 French-Belgian film Les Émotifs Anonymes by Jean-Pierre Améris and Philippe Blasband.

== Productions ==
=== World premiere: London (2017-18) ===
The musical premiered at the Sam Wanamaker Playhouse in London on 20 October 2017 and ran until 6 January 2018. The production was directed by Rice (who at the time was Artistic Director of Shakespeare's Globe), designed by Lez Brotherston and choreographed by Etta Murfitt.

The production received positive reviews earning four and five stars from The Stage, WhatsOnStage.com, BroadwayWorld and Musical Theatre Review.

=== Bristol and COVID-19 live stream (2020) ===
The musical ran at the Bristol Old Vic from 18 January to 1 February 2020, produced by Emma Rice's theatre company Wise Children and Push Theatricals with Rice returning as director and Carly Bawden reprising her role as Angélique with Marc Antolin returning as Jean-René (having previously playing Ludo / Remi). Following the Bristol run, the musical was scheduled to embark on an international tour, however due to the COVID-19 pandemic all dates were cancelled including dates at the Shakespeare Theatre Company in Washington, D.C. (17 to 29 March), the Wallis Annenberg Center for the Performing Arts in Beverly Hills (7 April to 17 May 2020), and Spoleto Festival USA in Charleston, SC (21 May to 7 June).

The musical was broadcast live from the Bristol Old Vic stage (featuring the majority of the cast from the January 2020 run) from 22 to 26 September 2020, being presented as a "digital tour", meaning that tickets were sold through partner theatres across the UK and US. Each region would be available to book on a specific night. The company was tested for coronavirus before forming a bubble, meaning the show could be rehearsed and performed without social distancing.

=== Worldwide productions ===
A Japanese production will open in March 2026 at the Brillia Hall in Tokyo, directed by Scott Schwartz.

== Cast and characters ==
| Character | London | Bristol | COVID-19 live stream | Tokyo |
| | 2017 | 2020 | | 2026 |
|---|---|---|---|---|
| Jean-René | Dominic Marsh | Marc Antolin | Marc Antolin | Taisho Iwasaki |
| Angélique | Carly Bawden | Carly Bawden | Carly Bawden | Sakura Kiryu |
| Father / Receptionist | Philip Cox | Craig Pinder | Philip Cox | Ryosuke Otani |
| Pierre | Philip Cox | Craig Pinder | Philip Cox | Tetsuya Ueno |
| Salesman / Fred | Joe Evans | Brett Brown | Omari Douglas | Tetsuya Ueno |
| Suzanne / Mimi | Natasha Jayetileke | Me'sha Bryan | Me'sha Bryan | Maria Kano |
| Ludo / Remi / L’oiseau | Marc Antolin | Harry Hepple | Harry Hepple | Katsuya |
| Magda / Brigitte / Dr Maxim | Joanna Riding | Sandra Marvin | Sandra Marvin | Romi Paku |
| Young Woman / the voice on a CD | Lauren Samuels | Laura Jane Matthewson | Laura Jane Matthewson | Marika Dandoy |
| Mercier / Mumbler / Marini | Gareth Snook | Gareth Snook | Gareth Snook | Kogaken |

== Critical reception ==
The musical received positive reviews when it opened in London with five star reviews from BroadwayWorld and Musical Theatre Review and four star reviews from WhatsOnStage.com, The Stage, Financial Times, The Independent, Time Out London, London Times and The Guardian.
