= 946: The Amazing Story of Adolphus Tips =

- Original language: English
- Written by: Michael Morpurgo; Emma Rice
- Based on: The Amazing Story of Adolphus Tips by Michael Morpurgo
- Music by: Stu Barker (composer)
- Setting: Slapton, Devon during World War II

Premiere
- Date: 25 July 2015
- Place: Lost Gardens of Heligan, Cornwall, England
- Directed by: Emma Rice

946: The Amazing Story of Adolphus Tips is a play based on the book by writer Michael Morpurgo, adapted for the stage by Emma Rice and Morpurgo. The play is a Kneehigh Theatre production, that was directed by Rice; it features a life-size cat puppet the movements of which were choreographed by Sarah Wright. The play is set in Slapton, Devon during World War II, and is partly based on Exercise Tiger, the true story of a botched military training exercise carried out by the United States Army as a rehearsal for D-Day, which left 946 soldiers and sailors dead.

== Synopsis ==
The play is based on a real-life event that occurred during the Second World War that was initially kept quiet. The 946 in the title is the death tally of servicemen who were killed while they were doing practice runs for D-Day at Slapton Sands in Devon.

The play begins before the United States Army arrives, with Lily living in Slapton with her grandfather, her mother and her pet cat, Tips. Then some children that have been evacuated from London begin to arrive in the village, and she becomes friends with a boy named Barry. One day, after the army has arrived, two of the soldiers, who are black, stop by the school asking for directions. The students are taken aback because they have never seen a black person before. Lily kinda develops a crush on one of them nicknamed Adi, which is short for Adolphus. The villagers soon find themselves being forced out of their homes by the army, so they can use the area for practicing a military exercise for the impending attack at Normandy. When Lily realizes that Tips has been left behind, she makes an effort to find him, but can't, so she relies on the American soldiers who promise they will look for her cat, who eventually reunited Lily with Tips. The show features a band onstage performing original and period music.

A ship is burning in a howl of fire, 60 foot flames throwing light into the air and onto the surrounding sea. It is a little after two thirty in the morning and the crew, American sailors, jump in. Out by Slapton Sands in Devon, the Atlantic is only a little above freezing, and they feel it. This is how 28 April 1944 begins.

== Background ==
Exercise Tiger, or Operation Tiger, took place in April 1944 on Slapton Sands in Devon. It was one of a series of large-scale rehearsals for the D-Day invasion of Normandy. Slapton Beach was selected for its similarity to Utah Beach; approximately 3,000 local residents in the area of Slapton were evacuated. As a result of the botched training exercise, 946 soldiers and sailors were left dead. British historian Giles Milton said "it's all the more staggering when you realize that more people were killed in the rehearsal for the landing, than were killed in the actual landing at Utah Beach".

Morpurgo said the idea for the book came to him when he was sitting in a pub in Devon that had an array of old black-and-white photographs of American soldiers hauling furniture out of Slapton. The barman gave Morpurgo a quick rundown of what happened during Operation Tiger. Morpurgo also said that he read a local history book about the subject matter, which included an anecdote about a cat that "survived 10 months of bombardment from ships at sea". The name of the cat – Adolphus Tips. Director Emma Rice said she heard about the book from her mum, and after reading it, said she "loved it". She went on to say that it's a "political book, and the heart of it has such a surprising twist that takes us from the modern day back in time and back again; I just thought this would be a great stage show".

== Tour dates ==
The show premiered on 25 July 2015 in the Asylum tent at the Lost Gardens of Heligan, on a run that ended on 23 August 2015. The play had its debut in August 2016, at Shakespeare's Globe in Southwark, London, on a run that ended on 11 September 2016. The show starred Katy Owen, Mike Shepherd, Adam Sopp, Nandi Bhebhe and Ncuti Gatwa. The tour then moved to the Bristol Old Vic in Bristol, for a short run from 16 November to 20 November 2016.

The show then crossed the Atlantic to the United States where it premiered at the Berkeley Repertory Theatre for a run from 2 December 2016 to 15 January 2017. The production then moved to Los Angeles at the Wallis Annenberg Center for the Performing Arts for a run that lasted from 9 February 2017 through 5 March 2017. The show made its off-broadway debut in Brooklyn at St. Ann's Warehouse for a short run from 20 March 2017 through 9 April 2017.

== Reception ==
Ratings
Review scores
Source	Rating
Bay Area Reporter	5/5 stars
The Daily Telegraph	4/5 stars
Financial Times	3/5 stars
The Independent	4/5 stars
The Observer	4/5 stars
The Stage	5/5 stars
The Times	4/5 stars
WhatsOnStage	3/5 stars

Claire Allfree of The Daily Telegraph said the "director brilliantly suggests the ramshackle intimacies between the characters; but at two and a half hours it feels stretched, but for Kneehigh it's not just the tale but the telling that matters. The New Yorker wrote that "if the script and its emphases perplex, the joyous staging consoles; the director, Emma Rice, has always had a way with visual metaphor, and her depiction of a calamitous battle—rendered with washtubs, toy boats, bright lights, and blood-red ribbons—is a thing of hope and glory".

Richard Dodds of the Bay Area Reporter heaped praise on the production, writing that "Rice takes us on a topsy-turvy adventure that improbably starts out with a pet cat that has gone missing, and carries us through comedy, tragedy, neglected history, a bebopping Yank invasion, and as happy an ending as you can find at a time when the cards were stacked in death's favor". Kate Wyver wrote in Exeunt Magazine that "the show spreads the message of accepting difference and welcoming newcomers, but the emotional scenes are never given enough time to settle before we’re thrown into a swing dance or unnecessary hand jive".

British theatre critic Susannah Clapp said "this family show mixes carnival and tragedy in a series of mash-ups, both merry and sad; its musical bounce lands a strong argument, as the stage is full of characters who should make audiences think again about the word 'migrant'". In her review for The Times, Kate Maltby wrote "like all Rice's work, this production is full of boisterous collective energy — and the occasional moments of clodding earnestness; there’s loss and darkness — especially when the show's title is explained — but perfectly pitched for a family show".

In his review for The Independent, Paul Taylor wrote "it draws valuable attention to a disaster long kept secret, and the show is also a celebration of the mutual acceptance fostered by the war effort; I'm not sure that they've yet achieved the ideal balance between inspiring sentiment and inspired silliness and the proceedings feel a bit padded-out". Laura Collins-Hughes wrote in The New York Times that "loads of puppets and Rice's customary practice of putting instruments in the hands of her excellent actors lend a pleasing whimsy to 946; Rice does not shy from the grimness of the military disaster; staged with smoke and fire in tubs of water at the front of the stage, it is horribly moving".

== Accolades ==
Award nominations for 946: The Amazing Story of Adolphus Tips
Year	Award	Category	Result	Ref.
2017	Drama Desk Award	Outstanding Lighting Design for a Musical	Nominated	
2017	Drama Desk Award	Outstanding Sound Design in a Musical	Nominated	
2017	Drama Desk Award	Outstanding Puppet Design	Nominated	
2017	Drama Desk Award	Outstanding Scenic Design of a Musical	Nominated	
2018	NAACP Theatre Awards	Best Ensemble Cast – Larger Theatre	Nominated	
2018	Los Angeles Drama Critics Circle Award	Specialty: Puppet Design	Won	
