= Meryl Fernandes =

English actress (b. 1983)

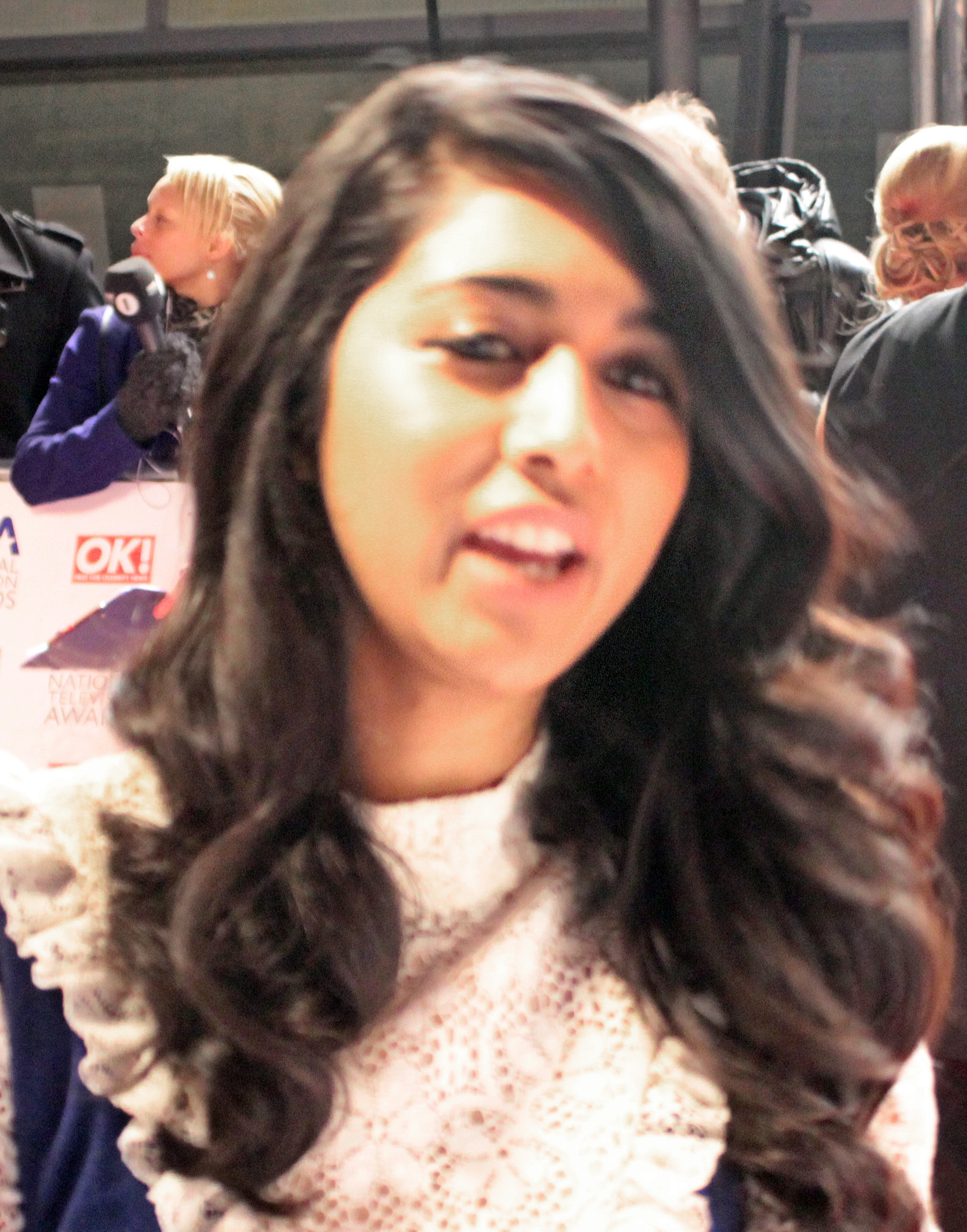
- Fernandes in 2012
- Born: Meryl Glynis Fernandes; 1983 (age 42–43); Tower Hamlets, London, England
- Occupations: Actress and presenter
- Years active: 1993–present
- Known for: EastEnders; Ackley Bridge

Meryl Glynis Fernandes (born 1983) is an English actress and presenter. She played Afia Khan, a love interest for Tamwar Masood (Himesh Patel) in the BBC soap opera EastEnders, originally making a guest appearance between 29 December 2009 and 5 January 2010. She returned to the role of Afia, on 18 November 2010, this time as a regular character. She departed EastEnders on 7 June 2012.

== Personal life ==
Born in 1983 to Harold and Ghislaine Fernandes, Meryl was brought up in London and went to Trinity Catholic High School, Woodford Green. Her parents, of Indian Goan ancestry, were originally from Nairobi. Fernandes trained at Millennium Performing Arts in 2000. She is skilled in several types of dance and has kissed Tom Hardy in a play.

== Career ==
Other than appearing in EastEnders, Fernandes has appeared Doctor Who, Demons, Minder alongside fellow EastEnders actor, Shane Richie, It's Now or Never, Clone and Dis/Connected. She has also appeared in the highly criticised YouTube series, Living With the Infidels playing 'Jot'. In stage she has appeared in The Lion of Punjab in 2006 and A Small Town Anywhere directed in 2007. In musicals she has appeared in Oliver! as a 'Workhouse Girl', in 1996 and sung in Il mondo della luna at the Royal Academy of Music in 2003. She has also appeared in a film, Ashes where she appeared as the lead role, Amisha, in 2012.

== Filmography ==
Television

Year	Title	Role	Notes
1993	EastEnders	Schoolgirl	1 episode
1995	A Small Addition	Schoolgirl	1 episode
2006	It's Now or Never	Flower Girl	1 episode
2007	Dis/Connected	Sara	1 episode
2008	Doctor Who	Head Girl	1 episode
2009	Demons	Amber Selway	1 episode
2008	Clone	Jasmine	1 episode
2009	Minder	Roxy	1 episode
2009–2012	EastEnders	Afia Masood	110 episodes
2016	World of Weird	Presenter	
2018	Ackley Bridge	Maryam Quereshi	2 episodes
2019–2023	The Dengineers	Presenter	

Film

Year	Title	Role	Notes
2009	Living with the Infidels	Jot	Main Role
2010	Ashes	Amisha	Main Role

Theatre

Year	Title	Role	Notes
1996	Oliver!	Workhouse Girl	Musical
2003	Sleeping Beauty	Sleeping Beauty	Stage
2003	Il Mondo Della Luna	Moon Dancer	Opera
2005	The Far Pavilions	Anjuli	Musical
2006	The Lion of Punjab	Jindan	Stage
2007	Who Asked You?	Deborah Smith	Stage
2007	A Small Town Anywhere	The Samaritan	Stage
2007	A Matter of Life and Death	Clerk/Nurse	Stage
2007	The Man of Mode	Harriet	Stage
