= Afia Masood =

Fictional character from EastEnders

- EastEnders character
- Portrayed by: Meryl Fernandes
- Duration: 2009–2012
- First appearance: Episode 3921; 29 December 2009
- Last appearance: Episode 4441; 7 June 2012
- Introduced by: Diederick Santer (2009); Bryan Kirkwood (2010)
In-universe information
- Other names: Afia Khan
- Occupation: Receptionist; Restaurateur; Optician
- Father: Yusef Khan
- Stepmother: Zainab Masood
- Husband: Tamwar Masood (2011–2013)
- Aunts: Shameem
- Other relatives: Tariq

Afia Masood (also Khan) is a fictional character from the BBC soap opera EastEnders, played by Meryl Fernandes.

Afia appeared in five episodes between 29 December 2009 and 5 January 2010, and returned on 18 November 2010. This is Fernandes' second role in EastEnders, her first being a schoolgirl in 1993. Due to Fernandes' character initially being a guest, the character was not announced. Afia was introduced as a love interest for Tamwar Masood (Himesh Patel). Her father was later introduced as Yusef Khan (Ace Bhatti) who was the former husband of Tamwar's mother, Zainab Masood (Nina Wadia). Tamwar and Afia's wedding was voted best wedding at the Inside Soap awards 2011. Afia is described as "adventurous and straight to the point, doesn't sugar-coat the truth, and doesn't follow everyone else." She has also been described as "slightly erratic" and "aloof". It was announced in May 2012 that Fernandes had finished filming her final scenes and that Afia would leave EastEnders in June. She departed on 7 June 2012.

Afia is first seen attending Syed Masood (Marc Elliott) and Amira Shah's (Preeya Kalidas) Mehndi celebration. Afia's friend Zulekha (Lisa Shah) gives Tamwar Afia's mobile number, though he thinks it is Zulekha's, and arranges a date. He is surprised when Afia turns up instead, and she says he is cute in a "geek chic" way. Afia contacts Tamwar later in 2010 and arranges to meet up. After meeting Afia's father, Tamwar's parents forbid him to see Afia as her father was Zainab's former husband whose family set her on fire. Tamwar ignores them and goes on to marry Afia. Masood and Zainab soften towards Afia and buys Tamwar and Afia the Argee Bargee restaurant. Afia's father marries Zainab, and he starts to control and abuse her. Yusef starts a fire at the local bed and breakfast and dies in the blaze while leaving Tamwar badly disfigured.

== Creation and development ==
=== Casting and introduction ===
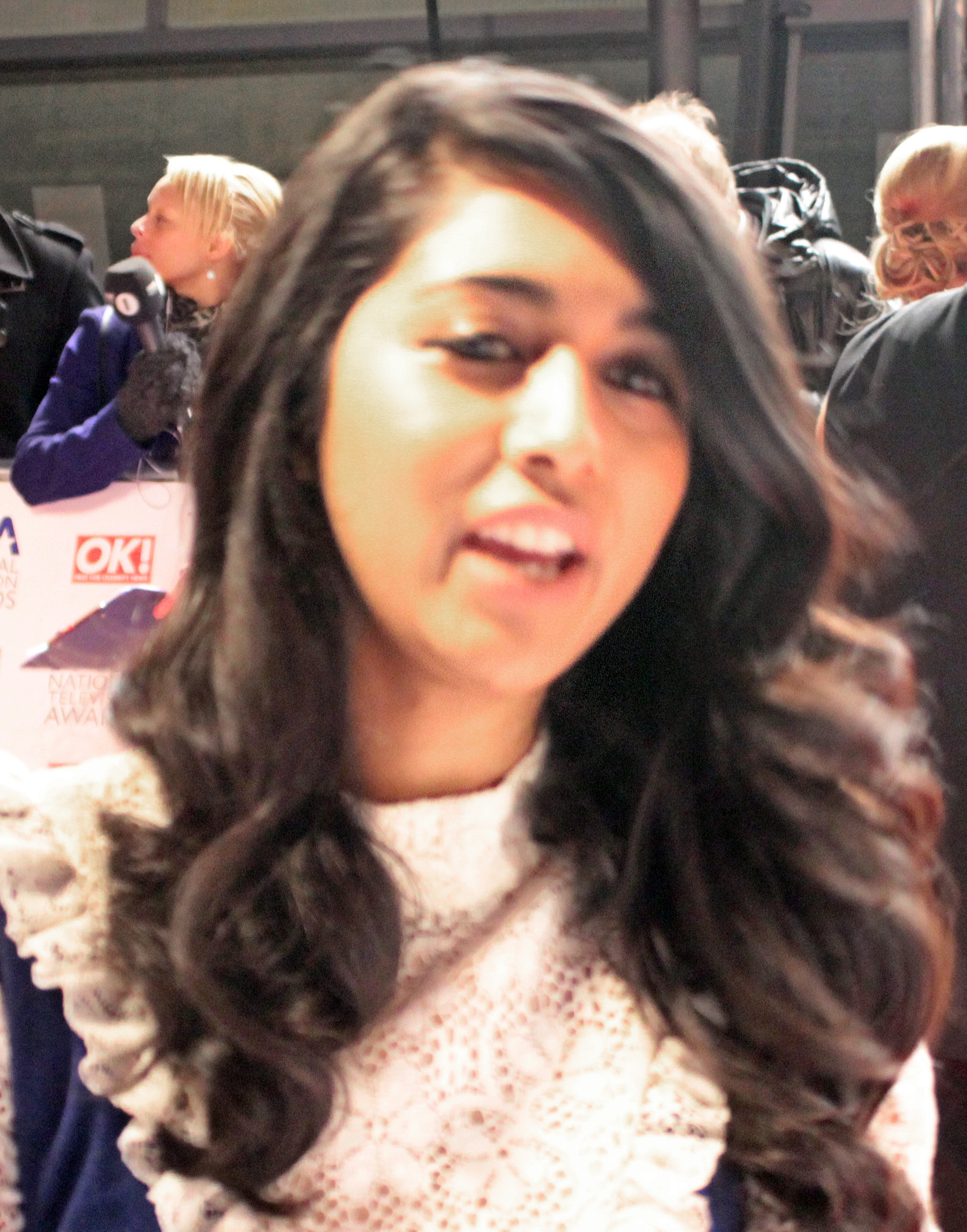
Meryl Fernandes (pictured) was cast as a love interest for Tamwar Masood (Himesh Patel) in 2009 and was re-introduced as a regular in late 2010.

Meryl Fernandes was cast as Afia as a love interest for already established character Tamwar Masood. Due to Afia initially being a guest character, Fernandes' arrival and filming was not announced. Upon hearing Fernandes return, Patel commented: "I'm glad that I'm able to explore another side to Tamwar's character. The best thing about him is that he's so layered. You peel away one layer and see something else underneath. I think the audience is going to be surprised by what they see next. Who knows, there could even be a wild side in there." After her initial guest stint in 2009, Fernandes made her full-time return on 18 November 2010. Afia is Fernandes' second role in EastEnders with her first being a schoolgirl in 1993. Patel praised the decision to bring back Afia. Speaking to Digital Spy, Patel said that he was "very happy" to hear that Fernandes would be back on set, explaining: "We filmed together for about three or four weeks when she first came into the show, which was about this time last year. We got on really, really well because she's such a lovely person and a great actress, so I was always asking people if she was going to come back. Then she dropped me a text to say that they'd got in touch with her and were bringing her back, which was fantastic." Patel also said that there will be "split-second change in Tamwar" as Afia makes him happy for the "first time in a while."

=== Personality ===
The EastEnders website describes Afia as "adventurous and straight to the point, doesn't sugar-coat the truth, and doesn't follow everyone else." It continues to read: "She knows what she wants and cunningly knows how to get it, which she proved by scoring the Square's local nerd Tamwar Masood. But can they live happily ever after with the past that lies between both their families?" When Tamwar and Afia resume their relationship in 2010, Patel said that Tamwar is grateful for his second chance with Afia. The Mirrors says that Tamwar finds it "hard to stand up to his wife at the best of times and with those brand new eyelash extensions shes able to flutter his feeble resistance to a pulp." In an online interview dubbed On set with...Meryl Fernandes, Fernandes explains that when kissing Tamwar, she adds Afia's "ness" and branded Tamwar the "best TV hubby ever."

=== Storyline development: Afia's relationship with Tamwar ===
"Yusef would die for his daughter - without question, at a moment's notice. At the moment, I think he's very happy that she's found love with Tamwar - he likes the combination between them and he likes the fact that Tamwar makes his daughter happy. He likes Tamwar, but at the same time, that wouldn't stop him from manipulating him."

— Ace Bhatti describes Yusef's relationship with Afia

Patel and Fernandes said that they want their characters to have a happy ending. Fernandes said: "I hope they live happily ever after. They're so in love. They're really cute and I think they have a very beautiful innocent love that I definitely think will last." Patel added: "We told them to make us the couple that last. In an interview with entertainment website Digital Spy, in response to Yusef tearing apart their relationship, Patel answered: "Every couple goes through problems. We both really hope it doesn't tear them apart." Tamwar and Afia decide to marry earlier than planned and in secret.

Talking to We Love Telly, Patel described the reactions of the Masoods when they find out that Afia and Tamwar married in secret, suggesting they would respond "With absolute fury! They will go absolutely insane." Asked what is ahead for Tamwar as he wonders how to break the news, the actor replied: "A lot more guilt and a lot more worrying… The only reason his parents are having money problems is because they are paying for a wedding that doesn't need to happen anymore." Nina Wadia added: "I think all hell would break loose! It would actually break her heart more than anything else, because she would feel betrayed again. That seems to be a theme for the Masood family - a sense of betrayal and a sense of pride." Asked how Zainab is feeling as Tamwar and Afia's engagement party approaches, Wadia replied: "She's very conflicted. It's a huge problem for her because obviously Yusef is Afia's father, so he's involved. I don't think she'd have a problem with Afia if she didn't happen to be the daughter of her ex-husband, but because that is the case, she's not happy with the situation. I think she does actually have a warm spot for Afia, though, and I think she also recognises a lot of herself in her - she likes her. So Zainab definitely has mixed feelings." In an interview with Digital Spy, Yusef's actor Ace Bhatti described Yusef's relationship with his daughter Afia and his reaction to their elopement. He suggested that Yusef and Afia have a "strong bond" and that Yusef would die for his daughter. He added that "it definitely hurts" when he finds out that Tamwar and Afia are already married as he is so close to Afia and she has betrayed him: "That definitely hurts, because he's so close to his daughter and there's been a betrayal of trust. But he's happy about the relationship and he's happy that she's happy. It's also quite handy for Yusef because it gives him an excuse to hang around the Masoods!"

In late 2011, it was revealed that Tamwar would be badly disfigured in a fire caused by Yusef. The Mirror revealed that Afia will stand by Tamwar but the injuries put pressure on their marriage. A source said: "Tamwar is lucky to be alive after the fire. He escapes but suffers serious scars to his face and it causes depression. For the actor it is going to be a huge challenge with a new look." Patel expressed that he was "eager" for Afia and Tamwar to stay together and settle their differences. Speaking to Inside Soap, Patel commented: "They love each other very much. But I think it'll be very difficult and tense as they try to move forward. This problem has surfaced very early in their marriage, so it'll be interesting to see what happens next. Hopefully Tamwar and Afia can come out the other side stronger - but nothing is really guaranteed, is it? The consequences of what's taken place are worse than anyone could have imagined," he continued. "Tamwar ran into that fire thinking Afia was caught in it, and he feels so betrayed by her. In the past, he's been stuck in the middle of everything going on around him. This time, it's all come down on him - and through no fault of his own." Discussing where the story could go next, Patel added: "I never want Tamwar and Afia to get divorced. From the moment they married, Meryl and I have said we want them to be the couple who stays together." Patel said that viewers will see his injuries caused by the fire. He told TV Times: "He doesn't want to show them to anyone and, when we do eventually see them, it won't be a sight for sore eyes. He becomes more of the Tamwar we saw before [he married Afia] - the one that hardly ever smiles. He shuts himself off from everyone."

=== Departure (2012) ===
In May 2012, it was announced that Fernandes would be leaving EastEnders. The actress had finished filming her final scenes for a June departure. An EastEnders spokesperson stated "Since the traumatic events of the fire, things have not been the same in Tamwar and Afia's relationship. As their issues worsen, they are forced to decide whether their marriage is worth fighting for or whether they have grown apart." Patel admitted that he found filming Afia's exit plot challenging and added that he wishes Fernandes was not leaving the show. Patel insisted that Tamwar and Afia were made for each other and hoped they would stay together indefinitely. He stated "The door has been left open, though, so there might be a chance for Afia to come back at some point. I really hope she will!". Patel added that he and Fernandes were delighted with their final scene, calling it "emotional". Fernandes made her screen departure on 7 June 2012.

== Storylines ==
Afia first appears on 28 December 2009, attending Syed Masood (Marc Elliott) and Amira Shah's (Preeya Kalidas) Mehndi celebration with her friend Zulekha Abbasi (Lisa Shah). Zulekha gives Syed's brother Tamwar (Himesh Patel) Afia's mobile number, though he thinks it is Zulekha's, and arranges a date. He is surprised when Afia turns up instead, and she says he is cute in a "geek chic" way. Tamwar lies that he is a student at Oxford University and when Afia discovers the truth, she finds it amusing but Tamwar is unable to see the funny side of the situation, and so Afia ends their relationship feeling Tamwar takes himself too seriously.

Off-screen, Afia's mother dies and several months later, she contacts Tamwar; they meet again and start dating. Tamwar meets Afia's father Yusef Khan (Ace Bhatti) who approves of their relationship, but when Tamwar introduces Yusef to his parents, Zainab Masood (Nina Wadia) and Masood Ahmed (Nitin Ganatra), it is revealed he is Zainab's ex-husband whose family set her on fire in Pakistan after her affair with Masood was discovered. Tamwar is forbidden to see Afia but he does so, regardless, threatening to move out if his parents object. Eventually, Zainab and Masood agree they can see each other and Zainab grows fond of Afia.

In the midst of continued animosity between the Masoods and Yusef, Afia and Tamwar marry in secret the night before their mangni (engagement party), breaking the news to their shocked family during the party. Meanwhile, Zainab softens towards Yusef, accepting that he was not involved in his family's attempt to burn her alive. Their renewed closeness alienates Masood, who leaves Zainab and she starts seeing Yusef regularly. When Afia's relative Tariq (Antony Bunsee) informs her that Yusef did start the fire that burnt Zainab, she keeps it from Tamwar but orders Yusef to tell Zainab. By this time, Yusef has made Zainab dependent on him so she agrees to marry him anyway. Yusef abuses Zainab mentally and physically, and when this is made public, Masood tries to get him arrested. However, Afia helps Yusef escape and he starts a fire at the bed and breakfast where Masood is staying, hoping to kill him. Believing Masood is trapped, Yusef gloats to Zainab and threatens her so she lies that Afia is also inside. He goes into the burning building to save Afia, but to Zainab's horror, so does Tamwar; Yusef perishes in the fire, and Tamwar is left scarred by burns.

Afia grieves for her father and injured husband but Tamwar cannot comfort her and even refuses to see her while he is in hospital, angered that she kept Yusef's confession that he burnt Zainab from him. He continues to ignore her when he comes home and is angered by Afia's plan to spend Yusef's money on plastic surgery to reduce his scars, telling her to leave if she does not like him as he is. Guilt-ridden, Zainab admits she sent Yusef into the burning building to his death and is responsible for Tamwar's injuries, but despite initial uproar, Afia forgives Zainab when the true extent of Yusef's abuse is divulged. Afia and Tamwar sort out their differences and try to make a success of running the Masood family restaurant but long hours and Zainab's interference puts further strain on their marriage. Tamwar heeds Zainab's advice and suggests to Afia that they start a family, believing she will settle once she has a child. However, Afia refuses, suggesting that they go traveling instead. Tamwar agrees but Afia is displeased when she realises that he wants to return to Walford after their trip. Afia, however, does not know where precisely she wants to go or how long for and is unresponsive when Tamwar says that she has changed, and he wants to know how to get her back. So, realising that she and Tamwar want different things from life, Afia tells Tamwar that she loves him and leaves Walford.

== Reception ==
Tamwar and Afia's wedding was voted best wedding at the Inside Soap awards 2011. Afia has been described by TV Pixie as "slightly erratic" and "aloof". When Afia and Tamwar married, the website said that the Afia and Tamwar storyline "ran out of steam" after leaving for their honeymoon. The Mirror states that Afia and Tamwar's wedding is "the kind of sensationally explosive event we have come to expect in Soapland."
