= The Amazing Story of Adolphus Tips =

2005 British children's novel

- Author: Michael Morpurgo
- Illustrator: Michael Foreman
- Language: English
- Genre: Children's literature
- Set in: World War II
- Publisher: HarperCollins
- Publication date: 2005
- Publication place: Great Britain
- Pages: 230
- ISBN: 0-00-718245-7

The Amazing Story of Adolphus Tips is a British children's novel written by Michael Morpurgo, and illustrated by Michael Foreman. It was originally published in Great Britain by HarperCollins in 2005. The novel is set in Slapton, Devon during World War II, and is partly based on Exercise Tiger, the true story of a botched military training exercise carried out by the United States Army as a rehearsal for D-Day, which left 946 soldiers and sailors dead.

The novel was shortlisted for a Blue Peter Book Award, and was also shortlisted for a Red House Children's Book Award. In 2015, the book was adapted by Morpurgo and Emma Rice into a stage play, titled 946: The Amazing Story of Adolphus Tips

== Plot ==
The story begins in the present when grandma Lily sends her grandson Boowie a letter. Upon opening the letter, he finds a note that is fastened to the front of grandma Lily's diary from her childhood, dated between 1943 and 1944. The note gives specific instructions informing Boowie that he must read the diary from beginning to end first, before he reads the letter. As Boowie starts to read his grandma's journal, he finds the diary begins in 1943, when Lily is just a few weeks shy of her 12th birthday, and is living on a farm in the village of Slapton, with her pet cat named Tips.

Boowie finds the diary is filled with the usual tales of a young girl that age; her reluctance to kiss a boy named Barry; petty squabbles with her mates; the rows she has with her mum; missing her father who if off fighting in the war. One persistent theme in the diary though, is her adoration for her cat Tips. As Boowie continues to read the diary, Lily has started to chronicle the arrival of American servicemen who have arrived on the island, and a friendship she has struck up with a black American soldier, named Adolphus Madison.

As Boowie reads on, he discovers his grandma's documentation about how Lily and her family, along with the rest of the village, are told they must move out of their homes – lock, stock, and barrel – so the American army can use their land to practice sea landings for their impending invasion of Normandy. Along with her own family, approximately 3000 other families are displaced, which leaves Boowie stunned to learn. Lily continues to write that her family has moved to her uncle's farm nearby; but her cat Tips, stubbornly decides to return to the area that is now been designated a forbidden zone. Panicked and distraught over the loss of her cat, Lily places herself in danger by crawling under the wire fences erected by the army, going back into the forbidden zone herself in search of Tips.

As the journal progresses to the year 1944, and Boowie's grandmother is now 12 years old, he reads that the previous friendship Lily had developed with Adolphus proves fruitful as he helps her find Tips, and also changes the course of her life. Boowie is now reading the letter, which details how decades later, after Lily's husband has died, she sees Adolphus on the beach with his son, and their friendship is rekindled, and she ends up visiting him in Atlanta. The story ends with Boowie reading in the letter, that his grandmother has married Adolphus and is bringing him home to London to meet the family.

== Background ==
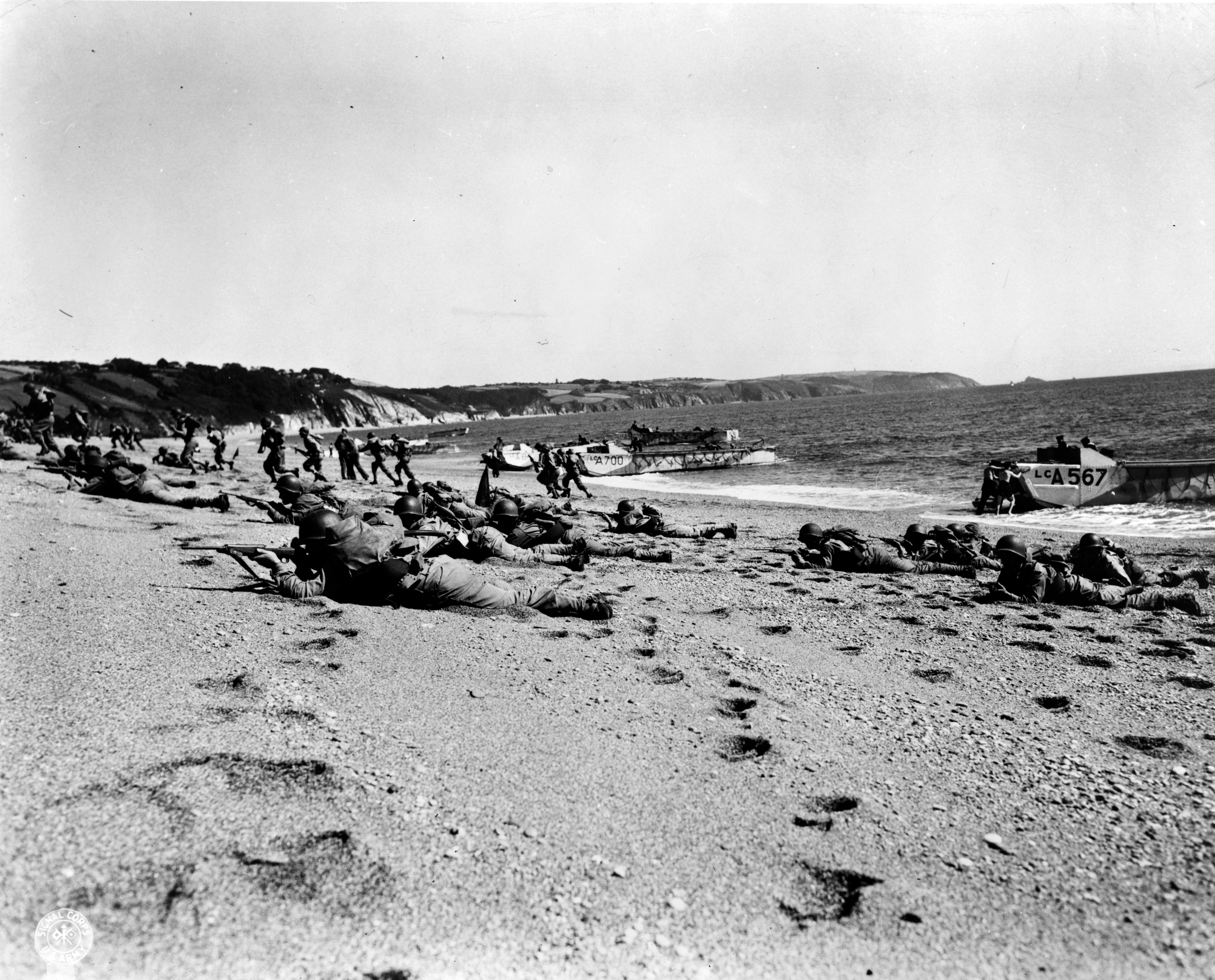
American troops landing on Slapton Sands during rehearsals for the invasion of Normandy

Exercise Tiger, or Operation Tiger, took place in April 1944 on Slapton Sands in Devon. It was one of a series of large-scale rehearsals for the D-Day invasion of Normandy. Slapton Beach was selected for its similarity to Utah Beach: a gravel beach, followed by a strip of land and then a lake. Approximately 3,000 local residents in the area of Slapton were evacuated. Some had never left their villages before being evacuated.

Coordination and communication problems resulted in friendly fire injuries during the exercise, and an Allied convoy positioning itself for the landing was attacked by E-boats of Nazi Germany's Kriegsmarine, resulting in the deaths of at least 749 American servicemen. (Note: Deputy Chief Historian for the United States Army Charles MacDonald, who was asked to conduct research on the exercise, said he believes the death toll was 946 – 749 soldiers plus 197 seamen overlooked earlier.) Because of the impending invasion of Normandy, the incident was under the strictest secrecy at the time and was only minimally reported afterwards. British historian Giles Milton said "it's all the more staggering when you realize that more people were killed in the rehearsal for the landing at Utah Beach than were killed in the actual landing at Utah Beach".

One such cat survived all the subsequent bombings and managed to remain near his old home until his mistress returned a year later. He rejoiced in the splendid name of Adolphus Tips.

— The Land Changed Its Face

Morpurgo said the idea for the story came to him when he was sitting in a pub in Devon before a neighbour's funeral. He noticed that on the walls of the establishment there was an array of old black-and-white photographs of American soldiers hauling furniture and people's belonging out of Slapton, a village in the South Hams district of Devon, a name that "vaguely rang a bell" to him. His curiosity now piqued, he questioned the barkeep as to what was going on with all the photographs. The barman gave Morpurgo a quick rundown of the disastrous American military exercise called Operation Tiger. Morpurgo also says that he read a local history book about the subject matter, which included an anecdote about a cat that "survived behind the perimeter wire during 10 months of bombardment from ships at sea". The name of the cat – Adolphus Tips.

== Release ==
The book was originally published in Great Britain by HarperCollins in 2005. The novel entered the children's top 20 best-selling list at number four in February 2006, and three months later, it still remained on the list; no other fiction title on the list had managed such longevity. An audiobook released in 2005, was narrated by Morpurgo and English actress Jenny Agutter. Morpurgo is the voice of Lily's grandson, and Agutter is both the young Lily who narrates the story, and her later self as the grandmother.

== Reception ==
In 2006, the book was shortlisted for a Blue Peter Book Award ("Best Book I Couldn't Put Down"), and was also shortlisted for a Red House Children's Book Award ("Books for Younger Children").

Jane Connor wrote in the School Library Journal that "Morpurgo frames this story with a grandmother sharing her girlhood journal with her grandson and a letter explaining what she has recently done; this is an appealing story, but it has a nostalgic quality that may limit its interest to children". In their review of the book, Kirkus Reviews said "Morpurgo's voice for 12-year-old Lily is clear and believable; a framing story for Lily's journal – that she, in her 60s, sent the pages about these months in 1943 and 1944 to her grandson – gives a sweet closing to Lily's account of her friendship with American soldiers; but readers drawn to the wonderful green eyes of the cat on the cover may find their disappointment that this isn't really a cat story assuaged by the considerable charm of Lily's narrative".

In her review for Booklist, Hazel Rochman wrote "the personal story of anger and love is as gripping as the war drama, and Morpurgo includes a fascinating note about the invasion rehearsal and why its history is seldom told". Sharon Levin of Language Arts wrote that "the book's beautifully written style truly conveys the effect of war, even on those not directly involved in combat". The Horn Book Guide noted that "Lily's cantankerous voice propels this diary-format tale of connection and loss; her maturation is affecting and believable". Jayne Howarth of the Birmingham Post said "the story - and the magical twist at the end - is both touching and surprising; it's Morpurgo at his eloquent best".

Kate Agnew of The Guardian opined how Morpurgo "has a well established reputation for his skill in bringing the past to life for young readers, specialising in the suppressed histories of wartime life". She went on to say the novel is "deceptively simple in tone, and Lily's diary reveals the complexities faced by ordinary people caught up in momentous events; this is a story within a story, one that crosses generations to remind us that the events of the past resonate through the years, giving pause for reflection and offering room for hope".

== Play adaptation ==
In 2015, the novel was adapted into a stage play by Morpurgo and Emma Rice, who also directed. It was a Kneehigh Theatre production, and had its debut in August 2015 in the Asylum tent at the Lost Gardens of Heligan. In December 2016, the production moved to the United States where it premiered at the Berkeley Repertory Theatre in Berkeley, California.
