= Wildworks =

Cornish theatre company

WildWorks is an international site-specific theatre company based in Cornwall, England.

== Overview ==
They specialise in large-scale outdoor promenade performances.

They were formed in 2005 by Bill Mitchell, initially growing out of Kneehigh Theatre Company. The company utilises specific sites such as harbours, quarries, villages and factories and works closely with the local community.

== Productions ==
- A Very Old Man With Enormous Wings - 2005 Adapted from a short story by Gabriel García Márquez
- Souterrain - 2006 - 07 Performed in Dolcoath Mine Camborne Cornwall, Stanmer Park Brighton,
- The Beautiful Journey - 2009 performed in HMNB Devonport Plymouth and Wallsend Newcastle.
- The Enchanted Palace - 2010 until 2012, Kensington Palace London
- The Passion - Port Talbot, South Wales, 2011. In collaboration with Michael Sheen and National Theatre Wales
- Babel - May 2012 performed in Caledonian Park, London. In collaboration with Battersea Arts Centre, Lyric Hammersmith, Theatre Royal Stratford East, and The Young Vic.
- Ark-Ive - August 2012, National Theatre London
- Nablus, Palestine - September 2013
- 100: The Day Our World Changed - August 2014 performed at The Lost Gardens of Heligan, Cornwall. Co-commissioned by The Lost Gardens of Heligan and 14-18NOW.
- The Yule-Tide Ark-Ive - Christmas 2014 and 2015, The Eden Project, Cornwall.
- Once Upon A Castle - Kasteel Van Gasbeek, Belgium, 2014
- Twice Upon A Castle - Kasteel Van Gasbeek, Belgium, 2015
- Wolf's Child - 2015, Felbrigg Hall, Norfolk. In partnership with Norfolk and Norwich Festival.
- Dream City - Tunis - 2015
- A Great Night Out - The Point, Sunderland, May 2016. In collaboration with Cultural Spring.
- The Great Survey of Hastings - Ladies Parlour, Hastings Castle Ruins, October 2016 delivered as part of the ROOT1066 festival and based on the Domesday Book.
- Wolf's Child - 2017, Trelowarren Estate, Cornwall.
- 100:UnEarth - 2018 performed at The Lost Gardens of Heligan, Cornwall. Co-commissioned by The Lost Gardens of Heligan and 14-18NOW.
