= Erik Liberman =

American actor and author

- Occupations: Actor, author, director
- Website: www.erikliberman.org

Erik Liberman is an American actor, author, and director.

== Early life and education ==
Liberman was born in Miami, the son of social worker Marsha and Havana-born vision scientist and author Jacob. He attended New World School of the Arts, where he became a YoungArts winner and was later named Alumnus of the Year. After high school, he trained at London's Complicité and Royal National Theatre, The Groundlings, Ann Reinking's Broadway Theatre Project, and École Philippe Gaulier in France. He cites Maureen Stapleton and Judi Dench as influences.

== Stage career ==
Liberman has originated roles in Broadway productions including War Paint, as Revlon founder Charles Revson opposite Patti LuPone and Christine Ebersole, directed by Michael Greif, and in Alfred Uhry's LoveMusik with Donna Murphy and Michael Cerveris, directed by Harold Prince. LoveMusik was nominated for four Tony Awards and twelve Drama Desk Awards, including Best Musical, and both shows issued original cast recordings.

He originated the role of Telephone Guy in The Band's Visit in a performance called "the burning emotional core of the whole night." The New York Times added, "When the ensemble, led by Mr. Liberman, delivers the show’s final number, 'Answer Me,' the music takes on a transcendent harmonic shimmer that stops the heart." According to interviews, "Answer Me" was written for the actor. The show received 2017 New York Drama Critics' Circle, Lucille Lortel, Outer Critics Circle, and Obie Awards for Best Musical.

Liberman "perfectly portrayed" Clopin Trouillefou in the world premiere of Disney's The Hunchback of Notre Dame with music and lyrics by Alan Menken and Stephen Schwartz, respectively. The original cast recording reached #1 on Billboard charts, toppling Hamilton. He also originated roles in stage adaptations of the films Reefer Madness! and Somewhere in Time.

His performance as Motel the Tailor in the North American tour of Fiddler on the Roof opposite Topol, Harvey Fierstein, and Theodore Bikel was reviewed as "a showcase of sheer star power" and "one of the best Motels I've ever seen anywhere." He later co-conceived and co-directed Raising the Roof, a 50th anniversary celebration of Fiddler at New York City's Town Hall featuring Joshua Bell and Chita Rivera, among others, and performed in Symphony Space's Fiddler at 50 gala, co-chaired by Lin-Manuel Miranda, Harold Prince, and Stephen Sondheim.

Liberman held roles in revivals including Sondheim's Merrily We Roll Along, for which he received a Helen Hayes Award, a 25th anniversary production of Into the Woods, opposite original Red Riding Hood Danielle Ferland, who was "well matched with Erik Liberman, who possesses a perfect Sondheim tenor," and in Kooman and Diamond's Dani Girl. He played Groucho Marx twice Off-Broadway and at the Obama White House. Drama Desk president William Wolf noted, "Unless we can dig up Groucho himself, Erik Liberman will do."

Liberman made his "superb" Off-Broadway debut in The Calamity of Kat Kat and Willie followed by For Elise. He appeared in concert stagings of Stravinsky's L'Histoire du Soldat, The Who's Tommy, and Carol Burnett's Hollywood Arms with Tyne Daly, and provided choreography for Mabou Mines Dollhouse, which played Off-Broadway twice, toured the world, and was filmed for television.

== Screen career ==
Liberman began working on television as a child, including an early appearance opposite Joe DiMaggio. Developmental concerts at Joe's Pub led to his role as the musical doppelgänger of Jay Duplass in the series finale of Amazon's Transparent. He also appeared in episodes of Martin Scorsese and Mick Jagger's Vinyl, Modern Family, Unforgettable and Angel, among others. He played one-half of the first gay couple to appear in a Procter & Gamble commercial, for Tide.

== Writing ==
Liberman contributed to books including Luminous Life: How the Science of Light Unlocks the Art of Living and Wisdom from an Empty Mind, both with his father, and Performance of the Century, celebrating the Actors Equity centennial. He has written for publications including The Hollywood Reporter, Variety, and Huffington Post and is preparing a book and documentary about American actress Jayne Mansfield. He is also a Moth storyteller.

== Bridge to Broadway ==
In 2020, Liberman launched Bridge to Broadway, an online educational platform connecting master teachers with theatre students, benefiting The Entertainment Community Fund and other charities. Guest artists included Chita Rivera, Joel Grey, Alan Menken, Judith Light, Ali Stroker, Ben Vereen, Lea Salonga, and André de Shields. He received an Encore Award for his efforts.

== Recognition ==
Liberman received a YoungArts award in high school and subsequent grants from the National YoungArts Foundation to act at Sundance Theatre Lab. He also won the Lotte Lenya Competition in 2005. Harold Prince was a judge and remarked, "Erik is the real deal... Once you've seen him, you can't forget him." Liberman paid tribute to Prince, whom he credited with launching his career, in a concert at 54 Below and at the Lenya Competition's 25th anniversary celebration at Eastman School of Music. He also appeared in Singing the Story, a documentary about the competition, and in a concert of the winners at Lincoln Center. Liberman is a recipient of Encore, Helen Hayes, Ovation, Garland, Connecticut Critics Circle and New York Musical Theatre Festival Awards.
