= Stuart McLoughlin =

British actor (born 1980)

Stuart McLoughlin (born 1980 in Bristol) is a British actor. He is notable for his appearance in the title role in 2008's Clone. His other TV appearances include 2008's Little Dorrit and Waking the Dead (1 episode, 2005), and he has also appeared onstage in A Matter of Life and Death. He has appeared in the 2007 film Elizabeth: The Golden Age.

== Radio ==
Date	Title	Role	Director	Station
26 September 2004	Hippomania		Ned Chaillet	BBC Radio 3 Drama on 3
3 March 2005	The Tragical Comedy or Comical Tragedy of Mr. Punch	Father	Lu Kemp	BBC Radio 3 The Wire
3 May 2011	Lost Property: The Wrong Label	Mr Nightingale	Jessica Dromgoole	BBC Radio 4 Afternoon Play
10 May 2011	Lost Property: The Year My Mother Went Missing	PC O'Hara	Jessica Dromgoole	BBC Radio 4 Afternoon Play
17 May 2011	Lost Property: A Telegram from the Queen	Marcus	Jessica Dromgoole	BBC Radio 4 Afternoon Play
