= Matthew Gardiner =

Matthew Gardiner may refer to:

- Matthew Gardiner (trade unionist)
- Matthew Gardiner (minister)
- Matthew Gardiner (footballer)
- Matthew Gardiner (artist)
- Matthew Gardiner, Irish dancer of the Gardiner Brothers
