= Marc Antolin =

British theatre actor

Marc Antolin (born 22 March 1987) is a Welsh actor. He was nominated for Laurence Olivier Awards for his performances as Seymour in Little Shop of Horrors and Leo Bloom in The Producers.

== Early life ==
Antolin is from Port Talbot, Wales. He began acting in school after a knee injury prevented him from playing sports for 18 months, during which time he joined the West Glamorgan Youth Theatre. He studied musical theatre at Arts Educational Schools, London. He cites Rowan Atkinson as Mr. Bean, Gene Wilder, Lee Evans, and the Marx Brothers as influences, as well as fellow Port Talbot actors such as Michael Sheen, Anthony Hopkins, and Richard Burton.

== Career ==
Antolin studied musical theatre at Arts Educational Schools, London and performed in, among others, the Royal Shakespeare Company and the National Theatre.

In 2017, he was cast as John Darling in the National Theatre's production of Peter Pan, directed by Sally Cookson. The production was recorded for National Theatre Live. Later that year, he originated the role of Ludo/Remi in Romantics Anonymous at the Sam Wanamaker Playhouse in London. He would later take over the role of Jean-René during Romantics Anonymous' run at the Bristol Old Vic in 2020. The production was filmed and livestreamed as a "digital tour" during the COVID-19 pandemic.

Antolin starred as the Jewish painter Marc Chagall in The Flying Lovers of Vitebsk, a stage adaptation of the life of Bella Chagall and Marc Chagall, first in 2016, and later in 2020. The Flying Lovers of Vitebsk was filmed as a live broadcast during the Covid-19 pandemic. Antolin considers this performance to be a turning point in his career.

In 2018, Antolin played Seymour Krelborn in the Regent's Park Open Air Theatre's production of Little Shop of Horrors and was nominated for an Olivier Award for Best Actor in a Musical. He played Leo Bloom in 2025 in The Producers at the Menier Chocolate Factory, reprised the role when the show transferred to the Garrick Theatre, and was nominated for his second Olivier Award.

Antolin is also a dancer.

== Filmography ==
=== Theatre ===
Year	Title	Role(s)	Note
2025	The Producers	Leo Bloom	
2024	I Wish You Well: The Gwyneth Paltrow Ski-Trial Musical	Terry Sightworsens	Edinburgh Fringe Festival
2023	Quiz	Tecwen Whittock / Mark Burnett / Quizmaster	
2022	The Band's Visit	Itzik	
2022	Murder on the Orient Express	Michel	
2021	The Magician's Elephant	Leo Matienne	
2020	Camelot	Sir Lancelot	
2020	Romantics Anonymous	Jean-René	
2019	Cry Havoc	Nicolas Field	
2019	Hedda Gabler	George Tesman	
2018	Little Shop of Horrors	Seymour	
2018	Flying Lovers of Vitebsk	Marc Chagall	
2017	Romantics Anonymous	Ludo	
2017	Twelfth Night	Sir Andrew Aguecheek	
2016	Peter Pan	John Darling	
2014	Taken at Midnight	Gustav/Understudy Hans Litten	
2013	From Here to Eternity	Private 'Friday' Clark	
	Matilda	Rudolpho/Understudy Mr. Wormwood	
	Singin' in the Rain	Sid Phillips	
	Bells Are Ringing	Paul Arnold	
2010	Into the Woods	Woodsman/US Jack, Rapunzel's Prince	
	Once Upon a Time at the Adelphi	Frank	
	Hello Dolly	Ensemble	

== Accolades ==
Year	Award	Category	Work	Result	Ref
2019	Laurence Olivier Award	Best Actor in a Musical	Little Shop of Horrors	Nominated	
2026	Laurence Olivier Award	Best Actor in a Musical	The Producers	Nominated	
