= Bill Mitchell (artistic director) =

British artistic director

William John Mitchell (2 December 1951 – 14 April 2017) was the artistic director of Kneehigh Theatre from 1995 until 2002 and created site-specific theatre company Wildworks in 2005.

Mitchell was born in Erith, Kent, and educated at Dartford Grammar School. He completed a foundation course at Medway School of Art and studied theatre design at Wimbledon School of Art.

He moved to Cornwall with his wife Sue Hill in 1988 and designed a number of Kneehigh's shows including Tristan and Yseult directed by Emma Rice, The Red Shoes, and A Matter of Life and Death.

In 2006, he was made an Honorary Fellow of Falmouth University.

Mitchell won the Best Director award at the Theatre Awards UK in 2011 for The Passion, a joint production between National Theatre Wales and Wildworks. In 2015, Mitchell worked with Lost Gardens of Heligan on a show called 100: The Day Our World Changed to commemorate local people who died in WW1.

Mitchell was diagnosed with cancer in 2015, but continued to work up to his death on Wolf’s Child which was performed at Trelowarren Estate in Cornwall in July 2017.

Mitchell's attic has been recreated at Krowji, Redruth, as an artists resource space, in digital and physical form.

== Productions ==
- A Very Old Man With Enormous Wings - 2005
- Souterrain - 2006-07, performed at South Crofty Mine Camborne Cornwall and Stanmer Park Brighton
- The Beautiful Journey - 2009, performed in HMNB Devonport Plymouth and Wallsend Newcastle.
- The Enchanted Palace - 2010 until 2012, Kensington Palace London
- The Passion - Port Talbot, South Wales, 2011. In collaboration with Michael Sheen and National Theatre Wales
