= Jerry Dixon =

American actor

- Born: October 15, 1961 (age 64); Chicago, Illinois, United States
- Occupations: Actor, singer, director, choreographer
- Years active: 1990–present

Jerry Dixon (born October 15, 1961) is an American actor, director, lyricist, choreographer, and composer best known for his work on the Broadway stage.

== Personal life ==
Dixon was born in Chicago. He married Mario Cantone in 2011 after initially meeting in 1991. Dixon collaborated with Cantone as part of the creative team for Cantone's one-man shows An Evening With Mario Cantone and Laugh Whore.

In 2017, Dixon was named Artistic Director of the Village Theatre in Seattle.

== Broadway credits ==
=== Acting ===
- Once on This Island, Daniel Beauxhomme, Oct. 18, 1990 – Dec. 1, 1991
- Once on This Island, Daniel Beauxhomme, 2002, reunion concert
- Five Guys Named Moe, Nomax, Apr. 8, 1992 – May 2, 1993
- If/Then, Stephen, Mar. 30, 2014 – Mar. 22, 2015

=== Other ===
- An Evening With Mario Cantone, Music/Lyrics/Musical supervisor, 2002
- Laugh Whore, Music/Lyrics/Musical supervisor/Music arrangements/Assistant Director, 2004
- Rock of Ages, Music/Lyrics, 2009

==== Regional Theatre ====
- Crowns
- Two Gentlemen of Verona, director
- The Full Monty as director/choreographer
- Take Me America as director
- Show Boat director, at the Village Theatre
- Bernarda Alba, director
- Barnstomer at the Red Mountain Theatre Company
- Ain't Misbehavin
- The Thing About Time, director, NYC workshop
- Reunion in Bartersville, director, NYC workshop
- Great Wall, director, Village Theatre
- Buddy's Tavern
- Dig Lenny Bruce
- 21
- Ragtime (musical), Coalhouse
- Dreamgirls, Curtis
- Funked Up Fairy Tales, director/choreographer

=== Off-Broadway Credits ===
- The River, 1988, Acolytes/Man No. 1 (u/s)/Man No. 2 (u/s)
- Once on This Island, Daniel Beauxhomme, 1990
- Bright Lights, Big City, Tad, 1999
- Taking a Chance on Love, performer, 2000
- The Bubbly Black Girl Sheds Her Chameleon Skin, Lucas, 2000 (also jazz teacher and dance captain)
- Tick, Tick... Boom!, Michael, 2001
- Newyorkers, performer, 2001
- Romantic Poetry, Frankie, 2008
- Steve, 2015

== Film and television credits ==
=== TV ===
- Beverly Hills, 90210, Beach Club Director, 1 episode, 1996
- Seinfeld, Customer, 1 episode, 1997
- Law & Order, Detective Alvin Roberts, 1 episode, 2004
- Everwood, Piano Player, 1 episode, 2005
- Mario Cantone: Laugh Whore, TV movie, 2005 (composer)
- The Broadway.com Show, Jerry Dixon, 3 episodes, 2014
- He's With Me, Lyle Pressman, 2 episode, 2015
- Gotham, Mr. Thatch, Episode:, "Mad Grey Dawn" 2016

=== Film ===
- The Peacemaker, Sniper No. 2, 1997

== Other work ==
Dixon also teaches classes in workshopping shows, auditioning, and adapting stories. In concert form, Dixon has performed and worked with such performers as Idina Menzel, Julia Murney, Norm Lewis, LaChanze, Marin Mazzie, and Raul Midon.

== Awards and nominations ==
- 2002 Drama Desk Award for Outstanding Featured Actor in a Musical for tick...tick...BOOM! (nominated)
