= Romantics Anonymous =

- Directed by: Jean-Pierre Améris
- Written by: Jean-Pierre Améris; Philippe Blasband
- Produced by: Nathalie Gastaldo; Philippe Godeau
- Starring: Benoît Poelvoorde; Isabelle Carré
- Cinematography: Gérard Simon
- Edited by: Philippe Bourgueil
- Production company: Pan-Européenne
- Distributed by: StudioCanal (France); Big Bang Distribution (Belgium)
- Release dates: 22 December 2010 (Belgium and France)
- Running time: 80 minutes
- Countries: France; Belgium
- Language: French
- Budget: $7.2 million
- Box office: $14.7 million

Romantics Anonymous (French: Les Émotifs anonymes) is a 2010 French-Belgian romantic comedy film directed by Jean-Pierre Améris and starring Benoît Poelvoorde and Isabelle Carré. It received three nominations at the 2nd Magritte Awards, winning Best Foreign Film in Coproduction.

== Plot ==
Angélique is a young French woman who has social anxiety disorder and is afraid of just about everything. She regularly attends a support group for other people like her. Jean-René, who owns a small manufacturer of chocolate called the Chocolate Mill, also has social anxiety, and is afraid of many things, particularly intimacy. The Chocolate Mill is failing because it makes a plain, old-fashioned kind of chocolate that no longer sells well.

Angélique had attended pastry school to fulfill her dream of becoming a chocolate maker. However, her anxiety prevented her from being able to answer questions or write exams. Luckily, a fellow sufferer of social anxiety disorder, Mr. Mercier, hired her to make chocolates for his tearoom and shop, Mercier Sweetshop. For Angélique to remain anonymous, Mr. Mercier told his customers that the chocolates were made by a hermit who lived in seclusion in the mountains. She thrived there for seven years.

When Mr. Mercier dies, Angélique applies for a job at the Chocolate Mill. Due to some misunderstandings, Jean-René hires her as a sales representative. When Angélique realizes that the company will go bankrupt if they do not improve the quality of their chocolate, she helps the other employees in making a new line of chocolate, claiming she has a way to communicate with the hermit chocolate maker.

At the same time, Angélique and Jean-René fall in love, but have substantial difficulties expressing their feelings and developing their relationship due to their fears and anxieties.

In the meantime, the other Chocolate Mill employees grow suspicious about Angélique's "connection" with the famous secret chocolate maker. Ultimately, with a little help from the other Chocolate Mill employees and Angélique's support group, Angélique is revealed as the hermit chocolate maker, and the Chocolate Mill becomes successful. Jean-René and Angélique finally consummate their relationship. The couple find an alternative way of coping with the stresses of wedding and remain together forever after.

== Cast ==
- Benoît Poelvoorde as Jean-René Van Den Hugde
- Isabelle Carré as Angélique Delange
- Lorella Cravotta as Magda
- Jacques Boudet as Rémi
- Pierre Niney as Ludo
- Alice Pol as Adèle
- Lise Lamétrie as Suzanne
- Swann Arlaud as Antoine
- Philippe Laudenbach as The jury president
- Stéphan Wojtowicz as The psychologist

== Reception ==
The film has been positively received by critics and holds a rating of 86% on Rotten Tomatoes.

Romantics Anonymous is a real-life help group that helps people with sometimes debilitating shyness. Jean-Pierre Améris, a highly emotional person himself, who attended real EA (Emotions Anonymous) meetings, and Isabelle Carré had talked about making a movie about their shared shyness. As preparation for the movie, Isabelle Carré also attended EA meetings.

== Stage musical adaptation ==
A stage musical based on the film was adapted and directed by Emma Rice with music by Michael Kooman and Christopher Dimond. The musical premiered at the Sam Wanamaker Playhouse in London from 20 October 2017, running until 6 January 2018.

== Japanese series adaptation ==
A Netflix Japanese series based on the film with the title Romantics Anonymous was adapted and directed by Sho Tsukikawa. The project features talent from Japan and Korea, including Shun Oguri, Han Hyo-joo, Yuri Nakamura, and Jin Akanishi.
