= Patina Miller =

American actress and singer (born 1984)

- Miller in 2026
- Born: Patina Renea Miller; November 6, 1984 (age 41); Pageland, South Carolina, U.S.
- Education: Carnegie Mellon University (BFA)
- Occupations: Actress; singer
- Years active: 2006–present
- Spouse: David Mars (m. 2014)
- Children: 1

Patina Renea Miller (born November 6, 1984) is an American actress and singer. Miller's breakout role was as originating the role of disco diva wannabe Deloris Van Cartier in the 2009 West End and 2011 Broadway productions of Sister Act for which she earned Laurence Olivier Award and Tony Award nominations, respectively. She also starred as the Leading Player in the 2013 Broadway revival of Pippin, for which she won the Tony Award for Best Actress in a Musical. She later returned to Broadway to star as the Witch in the 2022 Broadway revival of the Stephen Sondheim musical Into the Woods.

She is also known for her role as Commander Paylor in The Hunger Games: Mockingjay films, and her starring role as Daisy Grant in the CBS political drama Madam Secretary. She has also starred in the PBS series Mercy Street (2017). In 2021, Miller began starring as Raquel "Raq" Thomas in the Starz television drama Raising Kanan. Since 2024, she has voiced Sera in the adult animated musical series Hazbin Hotel.

== Early life and education ==
Patina Renea Miller was born on November 6, 1984, in Pageland, South Carolina, and raised in a single parent home, she was introduced to music at an early age and sang with the gospel choir at her local church. She attended South Carolina Governor's School for the Arts & Humanities and in 2006 graduated with a degree in musical theatre from Carnegie Mellon University. She has credited her time at Carnegie Mellon as a big part of her life, saying, "It was there that I studied and really realized that I could make my dream a reality. I'm so thankful to all my teachers who helped me to become the performer I am today."

== Career ==
In 2005, Miller was one of three finalists for the role of Effie White in the musical drama Dreamgirls, alongside Capathia Jenkins and Jennifer Hudson (which ultimately won Hudson the Academy Award for Best Supporting Actress). In 2007, she was cast as Pam Henderson in the daytime soap opera All My Children and appeared in 30 episodes of the show. She performed in a Central Park production of Hair in the summer of 2008 and was featured in the musical Romantic Poetry at the Manhattan Theatre Club that fall.

Miller speaking during a Hazbin Hotel panel at GalaxyCon Columbus in 2025

Miller was cast as the lead role of Delores Van Cartier in Sister Act, a role she had understudied for six months during its initial run in the United States, following a year-long international search. The London production opened on June 2, 2009, at the London Palladium, and although it received mixed reviews, most critics singled out Miller and praised her performance. Benedict Nightingale of The Times cited her "terrific voice," noting she had "Whoopi's wry vulnerability but add[ing] dazzle to the razzle around her," while David Benedict of Variety thought her "powerhouse vocals, pitched somewhere between Gloria Gaynor and Whitney Houston, and her thrillingly fast vibrato act as the show's engine." For this role Miller won the whatsonstage.com Theatregoers Choice Award for Best Actress in a Musical and was also nominated for the Laurence Olivier Award for Best Actress in a Musical. She remained with the production till it closed on October 30, 2010.

Miller reprised the role of Deloris Van Cartier in the Broadway production of Sister Act, which began performances on March 24, 2011, at the Broadway Theatre and officially opened April 20, 2011. Miller also made her Broadway debut in this production. For this role she won a Theatre World Award and was also nominated for the Tony Award for Best Actress in a Musical, the Outer Critics Circle Award for Outstanding Actress in a Musical, the Drama League Award for Distinguished Performance, and the Drama Desk Award for Outstanding Actress in a Musical. She played her final performance in the Broadway company on March 18, 2012, and was replaced by Raven-Symoné on March 27. Miller also starred as Linda in the City Center Encores! production of Lost in the Stars, which ran from February 3–6, 2011.

She performed as the Leading Player in the American Repertory Theater production of Pippin from December 5, 2012, to January 20, 2013. Miller reprised the role in the Broadway revival, which began performances on March 23, 2013, at the Music Box Theatre and officially opened on April 25, 2013. She won the Outer Critics Circle Award and Tony Award for Best Actress in a Musical at the 67th Tony Awards for this role.

Miller played Commander Paylor in The Hunger Games: Mockingjay – Part 1 (2014) and Part 2 in 2015. In May 2014, it was announced that she was cast as Daisy Grant, press coordinator to Secretary of State Elizabeth McCord (Téa Leoni) in the CBS political drama Madam Secretary. The show premiered on Sunday, September 21, 2014, on CBS as part of the 2014–15 television season.

In 2019, Miller starred as the Witch in the Hollywood Bowl production of Into the Woods and reprised the role in a 2022 Broadway revival at the St. James Theatre. From 2021 to 2026, Miller had been cast on television series Power Book III: Raising Kanan as Raquel Thomas, being nominated at the Black Reel Awards, NAACP Image Awards and being recognized by the AAFCA TV Honors for her acting performance. In 2024, she voiced animated character Sera on Hazbin Hotel. In September 2026, Miller starred in the Broadway play School Girls; Or, the African Mean Girls Play at the Samuel J. Friedman Theatre.

== Personal life ==
On June 14, 2014, Miller married venture capitalist David Mars in New York City. Robin Burch, Miller's mother, who is a Baptist minister, officiated at the ceremony. Their daughter, Emerson Harper, was born on August 9, 2017, in New York City.

In 2023, Miller sang the U.S. National Anthem at the start of the New York City Marathon in Staten Island and subsequently completed the race in four hours.

== Discography ==
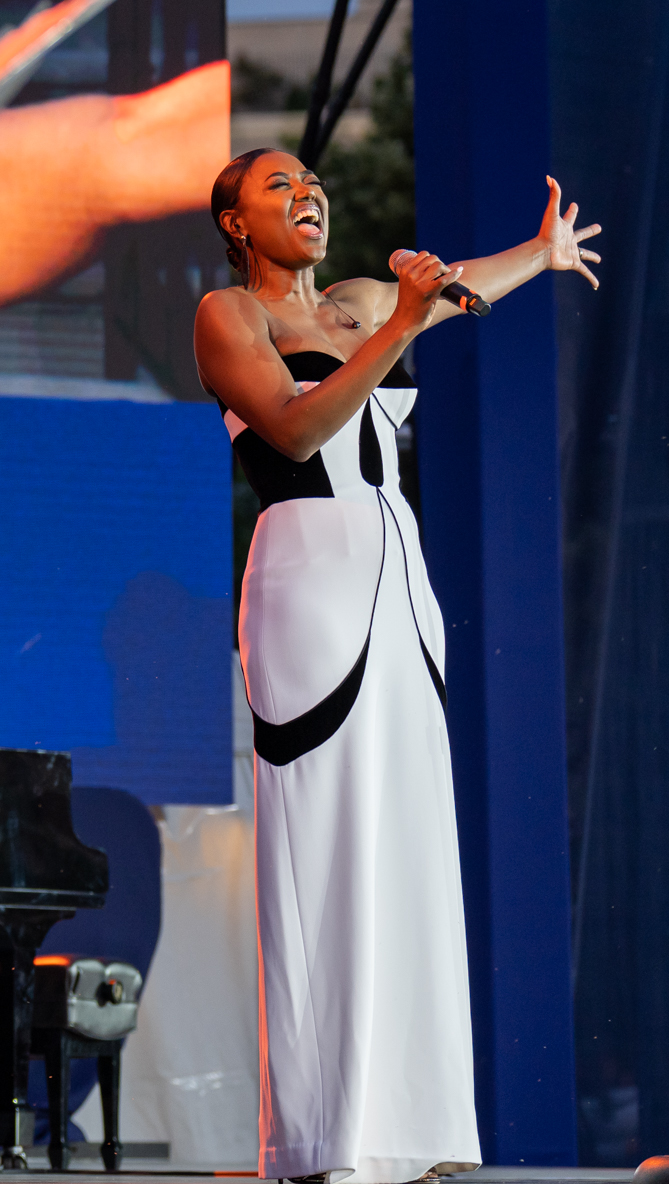
Miller performing during a Juneteenth concert in 2023.

- Sister Act (Original London Cast Recording) (2009)
- What I Wanna Be When I Grow Up by Scott Alan, singing the song "Taking Back My Life" (2010)
- Out of Our Heads by Kooman and Dimond, singing the song "Random Black Girl" (2011)
- Pippin (New Broadway Cast Recording) (2013)
- Into the Woods (New Broadway Cast Recording) (2022)
- Hazbin Hotel (Original Soundtrack) (2024), performing on the songs "Welcome to Heaven" and "You Didn't Know"
- Hazbin Hotel: Season Two (Original Soundtrack) (2025), performing on the songs "Sera's Confession", "Live to Live", and "When I Think About the Future"

== Acting credits ==
=== Film ===
Year	Title	Role	Notes
2014	The Hunger Games: Mockingjay – Part 1	Commander Paylor	
2015	The Hunger Games: Mockingjay – Part 2	Commander Paylor	
2021	The Many Saints of Newark	Queen Isola	

=== Television ===
Year	Title	Role	Notes
2007–08	All My Children	Pam Henderson	30 episodes
2012	Late Night with Jimmy Fallon	Deloris Van Cartier	Episode: "#4.35"
2014–19	Madam Secretary	Daisy Grant	108 episodes
2016–21	Word Party	Narrator	60 episodes
2017	Mercy Street	Charlotte	6 episodes
2021–2026	Power Book III: Raising Kanan	Raquel Thomas	Main cast
2024–present	Hazbin Hotel	Sera (voice)	5 episodes

=== Theatre ===
Year	Title	Role	Notes
2006	Sister Act	Ensemble/Deloris Van Cartier (understudy)	Pasadena Playhouse
2007	Sister Act	Ensemble/Deloris Van Cartier (understudy)	Alliance Theatre Company
2007	Hair	Dionne	40th Anniversary Concert
2008	Hair	Sheila	Central Park
2009	Putting It Together	Performer	New York
2010	Sister Act	Deloris Van Cartier	West End
2011–12	Sister Act	Deloris Van Cartier	Broadway
2012	Lost in the Stars	Linda	Encores!
2013–14	Pippin	Leading Player	Broadway
2013	Ragtime	Sarah	Lincoln Center
2019	Into the Woods	The Witch	Hollywood Bowl
2022	Into the Woods	The Witch	Broadway
2026	School Girls; Or, the African Mean Girls Play	Eloise Amponsah	Broadway

=== Concerts ===
In 2014, she performed at Lincoln Center. The concert was broadcast on PBS as Patina Miller in Concert.

== Awards and nominations ==
Award	Year	Category	Nominated work	Result	Ref.
AAFCA TV Honors	2025	Best Actress	Power Book III: Raising Kanan	Won	
Black Reel Awards	2015	Outstanding Female Breakthrough Performance	The Hunger Games: Mockingjay – Part 1	Nominated	
Black Reel Awards	2022	Outstanding Actress in a Drama Series	Power Book III: Raising Kanan	Nominated	
Black Reel Awards	2024	Outstanding Actress in a Drama Series	Power Book III: Raising Kanan	Nominated	
Black Reel Awards	2025	Outstanding Actress in a Drama Series	Power Book III: Raising Kanan	Nominated	
Chita Rivera Awards	2011	Outstanding Female Dancer in a Broadway Show	Sister Act	Nominated	
Chita Rivera Awards	2013	Outstanding Female Dancer in a Broadway Show	Pippin	Nominated	
Drama Desk Award	2011	Outstanding Actress in a Musical	Sister Act	Nominated	
Drama League Award	2011	Distinguished Performance	Sister Act	Nominated	
Drama League Award	2013	Distinguished Performance	Pippin	Nominated	
Drama League Award	2023	Distinguished Performance	Into the Woods	Nominated	
Grammy Awards	2023	Best Musical Theater Album	Into the Woods	Won	
Laurence Olivier Award	2010	Best Actress in a Musical	Sister Act	Nominated	
NAACP Image Awards	2026	Outstanding Actress in a Drama Series	Power Book III: Raising Kanan	Nominated	
Outer Critics Circle Award	2011	Outstanding Actress in a Musical	Sister Act	Nominated	
Outer Critics Circle Award	2013	Outstanding Actress in a Musical	Pippin	Won	
Tony Award	2011	Best Performance by a Leading Actress in a Musical	Sister Act	Nominated	
Tony Award	2013	Best Performance by a Leading Actress in a Musical	Pippin	Won	
Theatre World Award	2011	Honor	Herself	Honouree	
Women's Image Network Awards	2022	Best Actress in a Drama Series	Power Book III: Raising Kanan	Nominated	
Women's Image Network Awards	2023	Best Actress in a Drama Series	Power Book III: Raising Kanan	Nominated	
