= Clone (TV series) =

2008 British TV series

- Starring: Jonathan Pryce; Mark Gatiss; Stuart McLoughlin; Fiona Glascott
- Country of origin: United Kingdom
- No. of series: 1
- No. of episodes: 6

Production
- Running time: Approximately 30 Minutes
- Production companies: Roughcut TV; Chase TV

Original release
- Network: BBC Three
- Release: 17 November – 22 December 2008

Clone is a BBC Three comedy series starring Jonathan Pryce and Mark Gatiss, centered on the creation and education of the world's first human clone. Its first series of six 30-minute episodes premiered on 17 November 2008. After a planned second series was vetoed by BBC Three, Gatiss hinted at plans for a big-screen version, however this failed to materialize.

== Story ==
Intended to be a prototype super soldier who will eventually replace Britain's volunteer Army, his creator, the brilliant scientist Dr Victor Blenkinsop discovers, to both his horror and distaste, that his new super weapon is not quite the awe-inspiring creation he expected. In fact, the clone is more likely to hug someone than shoot them.

This modern-day Dr Frankenstein and his monster go on the run hoping to find the neurological trigger that will fix the clone and unlock his superhuman abilities. Unfortunately, they must also avoid Colonel Black and his crack team of security agents, whose mission is to find them and kill them.

== Cast ==
- Mark Gatiss as Colonel Black, The head of MI7: Britain's most Secret of Services. The Colonel is a blood thirsty nemesis who will stop at nothing to kill Victor and the clone. He is a man with limitless power and no conscience. He kills people simply because they can't find Blenkinsop or the clone. He shows no remorse after a false lead results in the death of two innocent people, a later mistake resulting in the death of an operative who had just provided him with vital information regarding the clone's whereabouts.
- Fiona Glascott as Rose Bourne, The Irish owner and bartender of The Peanut, a small pub in the even smaller village of Bletherford. Rose is a beautiful but shy young redhead of 26 who has several extraordinary abilities: a photographic memory and savant level math skills. She likens Victor's selfish sociopathic behaviour to her father. Upon meeting her, Victor realizes she could be the key to unlocking the clone's dormant abilities, resolving to acquire a little piece of her brain.
- Oliver Maltman as Ian, Victor's assistant, Victor's loyal lab assistant. A modern Igor, Ian is in awe of his boss and is willing to do anything it takes to help him, including being a human guinea pig or being beaten by the Secret Intelligence Services. Like Victor, Ian lacks a social life, although it's due to his shyness rather than his arrogance; he was apparently to be married, but his fiancé left him at the altar.
- Stuart McLoughlin as Clone, AKA Albert, The first human clone and appears to be in his mid-twenties. Intended as a prototype super weapon, the clone emerges from his birthing tube more likely to hug someone than shoot them. The clone is an innocent to whom everything is new, from chocolate, to laughing and dancing. He is fascinated by everything, but is naive of basic social interaction; while he has memory engrams to allow him to function as a soldier, he can't seem to access them, although Ian speculates that they may activate eventually.
- Jonathan Pryce as Dr. Victor Blenkinsop, A modern Dr. Frankenstein and the creator of the first human clone. A man who has mortgaged his entire life in the pursuit of a single goal: to take his place amongst the great names of science. Divorced three times, Victor is willing to sacrifice everything to achieve the glory he hungers for, something he can only do by fixing the clone and making him the super soldier he was designed to be.

== Episodes ==
No.	Title	Original release date
1	"Alive"	17 November 2008
Dr. Victor Blenkinsop creates the world's first human clone but, instead of being the world's supreme fighting machine as intended, he turns out to be a naive, clumsy and peaceful child in an adult's body. Desperate to fix his mistake, Dr Blenkinsop escapes his vengeful military paymasters (under Colonel Black) and hides with the clone in a small village. He meets the landlady Rose Bourne, who is also a math genius. Her brain may hold the key to 'fixing' the clone's memory implants.
2	"Albert"	24 November 2008
Victor's attempts to learn more about Rose's medical history is hampered by his own poor people skills. The clone- now called 'Albert' after Albert Einstein- continues to suffer from an inability to blend in. Dr. Blenkinsop's assistant Ian is forced by Colonel Black into activating the clone's tracking device. Just in time, though, Victor successfully diverts the signal to make it appear as if it is centered in France.
3	"The Line"	1 December 2008
Victor manages to divert the tracking signal coming from the Clone's wrist to appear to as if it's originating from different locations all over the world, changing at 12-hour intervals. Meanwhile, the Clone causes trouble at the pub and Victor has to introduce it to 'the Line', which he should not cross. Victor also develops his cover as a travel writer, causing him to have to attend dull events and visit boring tourist sites. Ian, implanted with a hidden camera during a 'party' at MI7, discovers Victor's location in the Lake District. Black, after being drawn to the Andes Mountains and Hawaiian Islands, finds out the true location of the Clone.
4	"The Ian Cam"	8 December 2008
Clone learns about money and all the things you can buy with it. Meanwhile, Victor tries to convince Rose she has early onset Alzheimer's in an attempt to get a map of her brain that will help fix Clone. He succeeds in getting it, and finds out that Rose is in love with him. Ian discovers that Colonel Black put a camera in his eye.
5	"Dude"	15 December 2008
Victor constructs a cortical remapping device to fix Clone based on the information he learned about Rose's brain. Victor also deals with the fact that it appears Rose is in love with him, something he learned during the brain scan. It ends up that Rose was not in love with Victor, but with the Scottish doctor Victor pretended to be during the brain scan. Clone learns about being cool and tries to become friends with the coolest kid. He succeeds in this when he steps in water and the cortical remapping device electrocutes him. He accidentally tells Rose about Victor having a map of her brain. Meanwhile, Ian fails in losing the eye camera by crying, but a dog gets the camera as a result of licking Ian. Victor gains hope when Clone tells him which weapons are most efficient in shooting oneself through the head. Rose forces her way into Victor's house and discovers the brain maps and Clone's remapping device, which makes her flee in fear.
6	"The Librarian"	22 December 2008
Victor comes clean with Rose about Clone. Throughout their day they meet an American librarian who seems to know a lot about Victor and Clone. Colonel Black finds their location, but they manage to escape. The episode ends on a cliffhanger as Victor flees with Clone and the librarian reveals himself to be an older version of Victor.

== Reception ==
The Evening Standard's reviewer Pete Clark pronounced Clone "daft", and said of Gatiss and Pryce, "I have no idea at all what they are doing in this dog's dinner." "The reviews so far have been enough to make you feel sorry for it," summarized Gerard Gilbert in The Independent, of the general consensus.
