= TV Pixie =

British website

- Company type: Private
- Available in: English
- Founded: London, UK, 2009
- Headquarters: London
- Founder: Alex Guest
- Website: tvpixie.com
- Advertising: Display
- Registration: Optional
- Current status: Defunct (2012)

TV Pixie was a British website about television programmes founded in 2009. The company was closed in 2012.

== History ==
TV Pixie was founded by Alex Guest after he left Zattoo, where he was the UK country manager, in 2009. The site was conceived as an ad-funded portal for television viewers to discover new TV programmes and to read reviews.

In November 2011, TV Pixie's blog was ranked 140th out of 4,935 television-related sites globally by Technorati, putting TV Pixie's blog ahead of The Guardian newspaper's TV and radio blog, ranked 210th.

== Awards ==
The company was one of the winners of the IC Tomorrow competition run by the UK Government's Technology Strategy Board in 2011.

TV Pixie's entry is a finalist in the Technology Strategy Board's 2012 Race For Apps contest.
