= Matthew Gardiner (artist) =

Australian origami artist

Matthew Gardiner is an artist known for his work with origami and robotics. He coined the term oribot (Japanese:折りボト) in 2004. Gardiner works in the field of art/science research called Oribotics: a field of research that thrives on the aesthetic, biomechanic, and morphological connections between nature, origami and robotics.

Gardiner, credited as Mat Gardiner, is the author of Everything Origami (Hinkle Books, 2008, ISBN 9781741825671), and Designer Origami (Hinkler Books, 2013, ISBN 9781743522905).
