= Orlando Family Stage =

- Former names: Orlando Little Theatre, Civic Theatre of Central Florida, Orlando Repertory Theatre
- Address: 1001 E. Princeton Street; Orlando, Florida; United States
- Type: Theatre for Young Audiences
- Designation: Non-profit professional theatre

Construction
- Opened: 1926

Website
- orlandofamilystage.com

Orlando Family Stage is a professional Theatre for Young Audiences (TYA) company based in Orlando, Florida. Founded in 1926, it is one of the oldest continuously operating theatre institutions in the southeastern United States and the only professional theatre in Florida dedicated exclusively to young audiences and families. Formerly known as Orlando Repertory Theatre (or Orlando REP), the organization rebranded in 2023 to better reflect its multigenerational audience and family-centered mission.

== History ==
=== Early Years (1925–1950s) ===
The organization began in 1925 as the Orlando Little Players and officially incorporated in 1934 as the Orlando Little Theatre. Its first Christmas Pageant was produced in 1932. It paused operations during World War II (1942–1946) and reopened in the post-war years. In 1959, the company moved to Montana Avenue and was renamed Orlando Players Little Theatre.

=== Growth and Transition (1960s–1970s) ===
In 1968, the group became the Central Florida Civic Theatre and began construction on a new facility in Loch Haven Park. The Edyth Bush Theatre opened in 1973 and the Tupperware Children's Theatre in 1975. The company also launched youth-focused programming including children's plays, a Drama Academy, and Junior Players ensemble.

=== Professionalization (1980s–1990s) ===
By the 1980s, the theatre had expanded its field trip performances and technical capacity. In 1990, the Anne Densch Theatre opened. In 1997, the Civic Theatre began a full Actors' Equity Association season.

=== Becoming Orlando REP (2000–2023) ===
In 2000, the Civic Theatre transitioned to a professional youth and family theatre in partnership with University of Central Florida (UCF), becoming Orlando Repertory Theatre.

=== Rebranding as Orlando Family Stage (2023) ===
Following an 18-month research process, the name changed to Orlando Family Stage in June 2023 to better reflect the theatre's focus on all families and all ages.

=== Centennial Season (2025–2026) ===
The 2025–2026 season will mark the theatre's 100th anniversary and will include new commissions, special events, and the inaugural Florida Children's Book Festival.

== Facilities ==
Orlando Family Stage operates in a 40,000-square-foot venue in Loch Haven Park, home to:

- Universal Orlando Foundation Theatre – 330-seat thrust stage
- Edyth Bush Theatre – 330-seat proscenium theatre
- Black Box Theatre – Flexible ~100-seat space

The facility includes a full scene shop, puppet shop, costume shop, prop shop, and the Florida Blue Lobby.

== Programs and Initiatives ==
- Mainstage Productions: Professional performances for school and public audiences.
- Youth Academy: Camps, classes, and youth productions for students of all experience levels.
- Theatre for the Very Young: Sensory-rich programming for children ages 0–5.
- Arts-Based Learning: In-school residencies and workshops that use theatre to teach academic subjects.
- Professional Development / Kennedy Center Partners in Education: Orlando Family Stage is a regional leader in this national initiative supporting arts-integrated learning.
- Access Initiatives: The No Empty Bus and No Empty Seat programs remove financial and transportation barriers for Title I schools. ASL-interpreted and sensory-friendly performances are offered regularly.
- UCF MFA Partnership: Site for graduate training in the MFA Theatre for Young Audiences program at UCF.

== Notable alumni ==
- Wayne Brady – Emmy Award-winning actor and singer
- Mandy Moore (singer) – Actress and pop star
- Josh Segarra – Actor (*Arrow*, *The Other Two*)
- Amanda Bearse – Actress (*Married... with Children*)
- Delta Burke – Actress (*Designing Women*)
- Ephie Aardema – Broadway (*Bridges of Madison County*)
- Jasmine Forsberg – Broadway (*Here Lies Love*)
- Francesca Battistelli – Grammy-winning recording artist
- David Blue – Actor (*Ugly Betty*)
- Aubrey Peeples – Actor (*Nashville*)
- Noah Schnacky – Country-pop artist

== Leadership ==
Jeff Revels, artistic director, has led the theatre since the 2000s. His directing credits include How I Became a Pirate, Junie B. Jones Is Not a Crook, The Best Christmas Pageant Ever, and The Happy Elf. He has written and directed works for Dollywood, the city of Manaus (Brazil), and Okada Manila, and contributed to nationally broadcast events like the National Memorial Day Parade and Philadelphia Thanksgiving Day Parade. He has received awards from the Florida Theatre Conference and Winthrop University, spoken at BroadwayCon and was honored with “Jeff Revels Day” by the City of Orlando.

Chris Brown, executive director, joined in 2012 and assumed his current role in 2019. A graduate of UCF and the Yale School of Drama, Brown has overseen strategic planning, capital improvements, and the 2023 rebrand.
