= Village Theatre =

Professional theatre in Washington, United States

- Formation: 1979
- Type: Theatre group
- Location(s): Issaquah, Washington; Everett, Washington
- Artistic director: Jerry Dixon
- Website: villagetheatre.org

Village Theatre is a large professional theatre located in the Seattle metropolitan area. It is a member of Theatre Puget Sound and the National Alliance for Musical Theatre. The theatre was founded in Issaquah, Washington, in 1979 and built a second location in Issaquah in 1994. Village Theatre was contracted by the City of Everett, Washington, in 1998 to be the resident performing and management company of the Everett Performing Arts Center.

== History ==
According to Village Theatre's Executive Producer Emeritus, Robb Hunt, the theatre's roots run all the way to Montana, where actor and director Carl Darchuk ran a small theatre. When a member of that theatre's board of directors, Jon Wheeler, moved to Issaquah in the late 70s, he encouraged Darchuk to come out and take a look. Issaquah had an old movie house that was standing empty, and a burgeoning population of young families looking for entertainment. Village Theatre debuted How to Succeed in Business Without Really Trying on April 20, 1979. In that year Village also elected six members to the original board of directors, with Darchuk as the founding artistic director.

Village, which now has 20,000 subscribers in Issaquah and Everett, is one of only ten companies in the National Alliance for Musical Theatre reporting such high attendance figures. Their Mainstage productions have included beloved classics such as Annie Get Your Gun, The Full Monty, Show Boat, and Jesus Christ Superstar. Additionally, the theatre's youth education program serves over 57,000 young people, families and schools annually.

Village Theatre was under the guidance of Executive Director Robb Hunt and Artistic Director Jerry Dixon since 1979 and 2018, respectively. Dixon succeeded original artistic director Steve Tomkins, who retired in the spring of 2018 at the conclusion of his 25th season at the helm. Dixon, a New York director and actor known for his Broadway and off-Broadway credits, has directed Village's productions of Show Boat, The Full Monty, A Proper Place, and The Curious Incident of the Dog in the Night-Time. Dixon, whose career has largely focused on new work, planned an expansion of Village's commitment to it.

Village Theatre is now led by Artistic Director Adam Immerwahr and Managing Director Derek Watanabe.

== Production history ==
Village Theatre's production history reaches back to 1979.

=== New musicals ===
The theatre's Village Originals program has launched over 160 new musical productions since its inception in 1995 (when it was called the First Stage New Musicals Series). The program presents readings and workshops of nascent shows during the annual Festival of New Musicals, and full-fledged trial productions as part of its Beta Series. Notable musicals that had their debuts as part of the Village Originals program include:

- Million Dollar Quartet, developed and premiered at Village Theatre in 2006 and 2007, respectively, opened on Broadway in 2010 and received three Tony Award nominations, with Village Theatre performer Levi Kreis winning the Tony Award for Best Featured Actor in a Musical.
- Next to Normal, written and workshopped at Village Theatre by Issaquah native Brian Yorkey, went on to win three 2009 Tony Awards out of its eleven nominations and the 2010 Pulitzer Prize for Drama.
- It Shoulda Been You, workshopped and produced at Village Theatre in 2010 and 2012, respectively, opened on Broadway in 2015, becoming Village Theatre's third original musical to reach Broadway.
- In March 2020, Hansel and Gretl and Heidi and Günter, a new work written by Hannah Kohl, Will Aronson, and Daniel Maté, was cancelled on opening night due to the COVID-19 Pandemic.

== Locations ==
Village Theatre was founded in 1979 in a historic theater building. This building, now known as Hunt Family Theatre, was built in 1913 by Mr. Rufus H. Glenn as a silent-film theater. The theater has a flat floor and originally had removable seats to make room for other activities held in the building. Village Theatre then constructed the Francis J. Gaudette Theatre—down the street from the First Stage Theatre—in November 1994. Village Theatre holds its Mainstage productions in the Francis J. Gaudette Theatre and its Issaquah KIDSTAGE and Village Originals programs in the First Stage Theatre. In 1998, Village Theatre was contracted by the City of Everett to be the resident performing and management company of the Everett Performing Arts Center. Village Theatre began leasing the adjacent property, a bank building built in 1962, from the City of Everett in 2010. Village Theatre renovated the building, now the Cope-Gillette Theatre, in 2015 to house their Everett KIDSTAGE and youth education programs.
