= Kneehigh Theatre =

International touring theatre company

Kneehigh Theatre Company
- Formation: 1980
- Founder: Mike Shepherd
- Dissolved: June 2021
- Type: Theatre group
- Location: Cornwall, England
- Website: www.kneehigh.co.uk

Kneehigh Theatre was an international touring theatre company founded in 1980 by Mike Shepherd and based in Cornwall, England. The company was based in barns on the southern Cornish coast, at Gorran Haven, but the administration was in Truro. On 3 June 2021, Kneehigh announced it would close.

== Overview ==
Kneehigh was started in 1980 by Mike Shepherd. Early productions were performed in village halls, marquees, cliff-tops and quarries. Their productions were often based around mythological tales such as the Hans Christian Andersen fairy-tale The Red Shoes, The Bacchae and the Cornish legend Tristan and Yseult. Their artistic director Emma Rice won Best Director 2002, Barclays Theatre Awards.

Their productions have been performed in locations such as Restormel Castle, Minack Theatre, National Theatre, Shakespeare's Globe, Royal Shakespeare Company and the Eden Project as well as their award-winning Asylum Season. They used a variety of theatrical elements including puppetry, live music (often played with folk instruments such as ukuleles and dulcimers) and an emphasis on visual imagery.

Between 1989 and 2006, Sue Hill and Bill Mitchell were working as part of Kneehigh on work that was happening outdoors and on site, influenced heavily by such groups as Footsbarn Theatre and Welfare State International. However, feeling that Kneehigh was pulling in two different directions, one based in studios and theatres, and the other based in the landscape, Hill and Mitchell formed their own company Wildworks. The first Wildworks productions were initially co-productions with Kneehigh until 2006 when they made Souterrain, their first independent production.

In the autumn of 2007, Kneehigh toured village halls in Cornwall with Blast! A Cornish Expose Performed by 3 Complete Idiots! and presented Noël Coward's Brief Encounter in Birmingham and at the West Yorkshire Playhouse in Leeds. After finishing a run of Brief Encounter at the Cinema Haymarket in the West End, the show toured the UK before going overseas to American Conservatory Theater in San Francisco, California, St. Ann's Warehouse in Brooklyn, and the Guthrie Theater in Minneapolis.

After that, Kneehigh took their work to the United States, Australia, New Zealand, China and Syria and other countries, whilst continuing to tour work in the UK. They were an associate company of Bristol Old Vic and Shakespeare's Globe in London.

Simon Harvey was resident associate director.

== Productions ==
Production	Based on/adapted from	Produced by	Venue	Toured	Year	Awards
Fup	fup by Jim Dodge	N/a	Asylum	Uk	2018	Unknown
Ubu: A Singalong Satire	Ubu Roi by Alfred Jarry	N/A	Asylum	Uk	2018/19	None
The Dancing Frog	The Dancing Frog by Quentin Blake	N/A	Asylum	N/A	2018/19	None
The Tin Drum	The Tin Drum by Günter Grass	N/A	Asylum	UK	2018	None
The Flying Lovers of Vitebsk	Marc Chagall and his wife Bella	N/A	N/A	N/A	UK Tour 2016	N/A
946	946 by Michael Morpurgo	N/A	Asylum	N/A	UK & US 2016	N/A
Rebecca	Daphne du Maurier	David Pugh Ltd	Asylum	N/A	UK 2015	N/A
Dead Dog in a Suitcase (and other love songs)	The Beggar's Opera	N/A	N/A	N/A	UK & US 2014 & 2015	N/A
Tristan & Yseult	N/A	N/A	National Theatre	N/A	UK 2006, 2013 & US 2013-15	N/A
Brief Encounter	Brief Encounter and Still Life by Noël Coward	N/A	West End 2008 & 2018	N/A	UK Tour and USA Tour 2009, Broadway 2010, Australia and US tour 2013/14	Nominated for four Olivier Awards and two Tony Awards
A Very Old Man With Enormous Wings	A Very Old Man with Enormous Wings by Gabriel García Márquez	Little Angel Theatre	Little Angel Theatre	N/A	UK 2011/12	N/A
Steptoe and son	N/A	N/A	Asylum	N/A	UK & US	N/A
The Wild Bride	N/A	N/A	Asylum	N/A	UK Tour, San Francisco, New York, New Zealand 2011-13	N/A
The Wild Bride	N/A	N/A	Asylum & Battersea Arts Centre 2012	N/A	UK Tour, San Francisco, New York, New Zealand 2011-13	N/A
Wah! Wah! Girls	N/A	Sadler's Wells Theatre	Theatre Royal Stratford East	N/A	N/A	N/A
The Umbrellas of Cherbourg	The Umbrellas of Cherbourg by Jacques Demy	Gielgud Theatre	N/A	N/A	N/A	N/A
The Red Shoes	N/A	N/A	N/A	N/A	UK Tour 2001/2 & UK, USA and Australia 2010/11	Winner of TMA for Best Director 2002
Hansel & Gretel	N/A	N/A	N/A	N/A	2010/11	N/A
The King of Prussia	N/A	N/A	N/A	N/A	2010	N/A
BLAST!	N/A	N/A	N/A	N/A	2007 & 2010	N/A
Don John	N/A	N/A	N/A	N/A	UK Tour 2008/9	N/A
A Matter of Life and Death	A Matter of Life and Death by Michael Powell and Emeric Pressburger	National Theatre	N/A	N/A	May 2007	N/A
Rapunzel	N/A	Battersea Arts Centre	N/A	N/A	UK and New York 2007/8	N/A
Cymbeline	N/A	Battersea Arts Centre	N/A	N/A	UK and New York 2007/8	N/A
Nights at the Circus	N/A	Lyric Hammersmith and Bristol Old Vic	N/A	N/A	2005	N/A
The Bacchae	N/A	N/A	N/A	N/A	2004	N/A
The Wooden Frock	N/A	N/A	N/A	N/A	2003/4	Nominated for the TMA Award for Best Touring Production 2004

== The Company ==
Although the company varied between productions, there were a number of associate artists who were repeatedly involved with Kneehigh including:

- Bec Applebee, Performer, Peer Gynt, Ship of Fools, Wind fall, The Bogus, Raven Heart, Wagstaffe the Wind Up Boy, Ghost Nets 1 and 2, Women who threw the Day away, The Three Island Project: The old Man with Enormous wings, Anybody like Me, Telling Tales, The King of Prussia, The Riot, Pandora's Box, The Red Shoes, The Wooden frock, RAA.
- Simon Baker, sound designer. Brief Encounter, Don John, The Wild Bride
- Stu Barker, performer, composer & musical director. A Matter of Life and Death, Tristan & Yseult, Cubeline, Brief Encounter, Nights at the Circus, Rapunzel, The Bacchae, The Wooden Frock, Pandora's Box, The Red Shoes, The Itch, Roger Salmon, Don John, The Wild Bride
- Dominic Bilkey, sound designer. The Bacchae, Tristan & Yseult, Cymbeline, Rapunzel
- Jim Carey, performer & musical director. The Riot, Strange Cargo, The King of Prussia, Tregeagle, Ship of Fools, Peer Gynt, Windfall, Ting Tang Mine, The Bogus, Ravenheart, The Lost Stories of Don Quixote, The Arabian Nights
- Paul Crewes, producer. The Bacchae, The Wooden Frock, Cymbeline, Rapunzel, Don John, The Wild Bride
- Gisli Orn Gardarsson, performer. A Matter of Life and Death, Nights at the Circus, Don John
- Carl Grose, performer & writer. Performer: The King of Prussia, Strange Cargo, Wagstaffe the Wind-up Boy, Chucky Vs Alien, Nights at the Circus, Cymbeline, Blast!, Don John, Hansel & Gretel Writer: Quicksilver, Tristan & Yseult, The Bacchae, Cymbeline, Hansel & Gretel, The Wild Bride
- Craig Johnson, performer. Cry Wolf, Quicksilver, Skulduggery, Tristan & Yseult, The Bacchae, Cymbeline, A Matter of Life and Death, Blast!, Journey to the Centre of the Earth (which he also directed), Don John, Hansel & Gretel
- Amanda Lawrence, performer. The Wooden Frock Tristan & Yseult, Knights at the Circus, Brief Encounter
- Dom Lawton, performer & musician. A Matter of Life and Death, Annabelle Lee, Cymbeline, Hanging Around, Don John
- Robert Luckay, performer. The Bacchae, Cymbeline
- Jack Morrison. The Wooden Frock, Wagstaffe the Wind up Boy, The Bacchae, Journey to the Centre of the Earth, A Matter of Life and Death, Cymbeline, Rapunzel, Blast!, Don John, Tristan & Yseult
- Anna Maria Murphy, writer. Tristan & Yseult, The Bacchae, The Red Shoes, Skulduggery, Doubtful Island, Ghost Nets, Women Who Threw the Day Away, Telling Tales
- Dave Mynne, performer & founder member. Don John
- Emma Rice, artistic director and performer. The Red Shoes, The Wooden Frock, The Bacchae, Tristan & Yseult, Nights at the Circus, Cymbeline, A Matter of Life and Death, Rapunzel, Brief Encounter, Don John, The Wild Bride.
- Malcolm Rippeth, lighting designer. Brief Encounter, Cymbeline, Nights at the Circus, The Bacchae, Pandora's Box, Don John, The Wild Bride
- Ian Ross, musician. Brief Encounter, Don John, Hansel and Gretel, The Red Shoes, The Wild Bride, Tristan and Yseult, Midnights Pumpkin, 946, Dead Dog in a Suitcase, The Flying Lovers of Vitebsk, Composer Hansel and Gretel, Very Old man with Enormous wings, the Flying Lovers of Vitebsk
- Mike Shepherd, performer and founder. The Red Shoes, The Wooden Frock, The Bacchae, A Matter of Life and Death, Cymbeline, Rapunzel, Blast!, Don John, Tristan & Yseult
- Tristan Sturrock, performer. Brief Encounter, A Matter of Life and Death, The Riot, Tristan and Yseult, The King of Prussia, Tregeagle, Ship of Fools, Peer Gynt, The Ashmaid, Danger My Ally, Windfall, Don John
- Michael Vale, designer. Rapunzel, Cymbeline
- Alex Wardle, lighting designer. Tristan & Yseult, Rapunzel, The Wooden Frock, The Riot, The Red Shoes
- Mary Woodvine, performer. The Young Man of Cury, Windfall, King of Prussia, The Riot, Fishboy, Skullduggery, Don John
- Sarah Wright, puppet designer / director, performer. Wild Bride, Dead Dog in a Suitcase, 946, Tin Drum, Brief Encounter, Very Old Man With Enormous Wings.
