= Christopher Dimond =

American dramatist

Christopher Dimond is an American playwright, librettist, and lyricist currently living in New York City. He is most known for his work on the musical Dani Girl and the song cycle "Homemade Fusion", both of which were written with composer Michael Kooman.

He holds degrees from Duquesne University, The University of Pennsylvania, and Carnegie Mellon University.

Chris Dimond is the recipient of the ASCAP Harold Adamson Lyric Award, the KCACTF Music Theater Award, 2nd Place in the Mark Twain Prize for Comic Playwriting, an ASCAPLUS Award, an Alfred P. Sloan Screenwriting Fellowship, the Schubert Fellowship for Dramatic Writing, the Mary Marlin Fisher Playwriting Award, and was a finalist for the John Cauble Award.

His musical Golden Gate (music by Michael Kooman) premiered in August 2009 at the Williamstown Theater Festival.
