= Emma Rice =

English actress, director and theatre professional (born 1967)

- Born: Emma Juliet Rice; 1967 (age 58–59); Oxfordshire, England
- Occupations: Director, Actress, Writer
- Known for: Kneehigh Theatre, Shakespeare's Globe, Wise Children/Emma Rice Company

Emma Juliet Rice (born August 1967) is a British actor, director and writer. Described as a fearless director, Rice's work includes theatrical adaptations of Brief Encounter, The Red Shoes and Wise Children. In 2022, Rice was named in the Sky Arts Top 50 most influential British artists. Rice worked with Kneehigh Theatre in Cornwall for twenty years as an actor, director, then artistic director with co-artistic director, Mike Shepherd. She was the Artistic Director of Shakespeare's Globe from 2016 to 2018, before founding her own touring theatre company Wise Children, later renamed the Emma Rice Company.

== Early life ==
Rice was born in Oxfordshire, England, and grew up in Nottingham, where her mother was a social worker and her father was a lecturer in personnel management. After studying English and Stage Design at Harrington College Rice went on to study acting at the Guildhall School of Music and Drama.

== Career ==
After graduating from Guildhall, Rice spent eight years working with Alibi Theatre, performing theatre that emphasised storytelling. Alongside touring the UK and performing to children and communities with Alibi, Rice trained in Poland, with Gardzienice, a company founded by Włodzimierz Staniewski.

In 1994, Rice joined the Cornish theatre company, Kneehigh, as a performer. After taking on increasing creative responsibilities, Kneehigh Artistic directors Bill Mitchell and Mike Shepherd encouraged her to direct and her first production, The Itch, was staged in 1999. As a director, Rice says that her long-running production of The Red Shoes represented the point in her career when she came into her own. Rice went on to become the artistic director of Kneehigh, alongside Mike Shepherd, and under their leadership Kneehigh produced adaptations and original work, including Tristan and Yseult, The Bacchae and a 'seedy, dreamy' take on Angela Carter's Nights at the Circus. While Rice's work did not always please critics, Kneehigh's 'visually stunning, inventive, often subversive and unashamedly populist' shows toured in the UK and internationally.

In 2015, it was announced that Rice would take over from Dominic Dromgoole as artistic director of Shakespeare's Globe, with Rice applying for the role despite stating: "I have tried to sit down with Shakespeare but it doesn’t work... I get very sleepy and then suddenly I want to listen to The Archers." After a summer season that included Rice's A Midsummer Night's Dream and 'exceptionally strong' box office returns, it was announced in October 2016 that Rice would leave the Globe in April 2018. The announcement followed a decision by the theatre's board, which cited concerns over authenticity and her use of lighting technology after she refused to adhere to the Globe's founding principles of “shared light" and non-amplified sound. Previous artistic director Dromgoole disagreed with Rice's attempts to move away from this traditional "shared light" – in which the actors and audience are in the same light – which he said was "at the heart of her disagreements with colleagues and the board". Her final Shakespeare production at the Globe was Twelfth Night, which received middling reviews, with the Arts Desk stating the production "ends up giving two fingers to Shakespeare, which rather makes the board’s case for them."

In 2017, Rice announced her new touring theatre company, Wise Children. Standard Issue Magazine made her their woman of the year in 2016 for "her fearlessness, leadership, innovation and bravery". Wise Children was accepted into Arts Council England’s group of regularly-supported organisations, and allocated annual funding of £475,000 from 2018. This was not without controversy; Christy Romer, a journalist for Arts Professional, said that allowing Wise Children into the Arts Council's national portfolio despite its lack of any track record "makes a mockery of the entire arts funding system".

During the COVID-19 pandemic, Rice's Wise Children livestreamed a fully-staged production to a global audience: their production of Romantics Anonymous which had been due to tour the US before the pandemic. Alongside the live streams Rice also presents a podcast series looking behind the scenes of her work and process.

In 2021, Rice directed an adaptation of Emily Brontë’s Wuthering Heights that toured at Bristol Old Vic and Theare Royal Brighton, receiving mixed to positive reviews from critics.

Rice's life and career, illustrated by the music that played a large part in her life, were featured in Michael Berkeley's Private Passions on BBC Radio 3 in May 2025.

In September 2025, Wise Children changed its name to the Emma Rice Company.

Emma Rice Production Credits
Productions	Year Of Originating Production	Role	Production company	Notes
The Itch	1999	Director/Performer	Kneehigh Theatre	
The Red Shoes	2000	Adapter/Director	Kneehigh Theatre	This production has had numerous revivals
Cry Wolf	2001	Performer	Kneehigh Theatre	
Pandora's Box	2002	Adapter/Performer/Director	Kneehigh Theatre	
Tristan & Yseult	2003	Adapter/Performer/Director	Kneehigh Theatre	This production has had numerous revivals
The Wooden Frock	2004	Adapter/Performer/Director	Kneehigh Theatre	
The Bacchae	2005	Adaptor/Director	Kneehigh Theatre	
Nights At The Circus	2006	Adapter/Director	Kneehigh Theatre	
Cymbeline	2006	Director/Performer	Kneehigh Theatre	
Rapunzel	2006	Director	Kneehigh Theatre	
A Matter Of Life & Death	2007	Adapter/Director	National Theatre	
Brief Encounter	2007	Adapter/Director	David Pugh and Dafydd Rogers/Kneehigh Theatre	This production has had numerous revivals
Don John	2008	Adapter/Director	Kneehigh Theatre/RSC	
The Wild Bride	2011	Adapter/Director	Kneehigh Theatre	
Midnight's Pumpkin	2011	Adapter/Director	Kneehigh Theatre	
Steptoe & Son	2012	Adapter/Director	Kneehigh Theatre	
Rebecca	2015	Adapter/Director	David Pugh and Dafydd Rogers/Kneehigh Theatre	
The Umbrellas Of Cherbourg	2011	Director		
Oedipussy	2012	Director	SpyMonkey	
The Empress	2013	Director	RSC	A Play by Tanika Gupta
The Flying Lovers Of Vitebsk	2016	Director	Kneehigh Theatre	Based on a play by Daniel Jamieson & Emma Rice (The Birthday)
946: The Amazing Story of Adolphus Tips	2017	Adapter/Director	Kneehigh Theatre	Based on the book by Michael Morpurgo (The Amazing Story of Adolphus Tips)
A Midsummer Night's Dream	2016	Director	Shakespeare's Globe	Also broadcast by the BBC
Wah Wah Girls	2015	Director	Sadlers Wells	A Play by Tanika Gupta, music by Niraj Chag
Twelfth Night	2017	Director	Shakespeare's Globe	
The Little Match Girl	2017	Director	Shakespeare's Globe	
Romantics Anonymous	2016	Director	Shakespeare's Globe	Adapted and directed by Emma Rice with music by Michael Kooman and Christopher Dimond
Wise Children	2018	Adapter/Director	Wise Children	A co-production with The Old Vic London, Bristol Old Vic & York Theatre Royal. Based on the novel by Angela Carter. This production was also filmed for cinema release and broadcast by the BBC.
Bagdad Cafe	2021	Adapter/Director	Wise Children	A co-production with The Old Vic London based on the film by Percy Adlon. This production was also Live Streamed as part of the Old Vic In Camera series.
Malory Towers	2019	Adapter/Director	Wise Children	Based on the books of Enid Blyton. A co-production with David Pugh and Dafydd Rogers
Wuthering Heights	2021	Adapter/Director	Wise Children	Based on the novel by Emily Bronté. This production has been filmed for Sky Arts.
Blue Beard	2024	Adapter/Director	Wise Children	A co-production with Birmingham Rep, HOME Manchester, Royal Lyceum Theatre Edinburgh, and York Theatre Royal, based on the French folktale.
