= BBC Audio Drama Awards =

Awards ceremony created by BBC Radio

- Current: BBC Audio Drama Awards #2024
- Awarded for: Excellence in the radio industry, in particular in audio dramas
- Date: Annually in late January / early February
- Location: BBC Radio Theatre, Broadcasting House
- Country: United Kingdom
- Hosted by: Meera Syal
- First award: January 29, 2012; 14 years ago

The BBC Audio Drama Awards is an awards ceremony created by BBC Radio to recognise excellence in the radio industry, in particular in audio dramas. The inaugural awards were presented in 2012 and the ceremony hosted at the BBC Radio Theatre, Broadcasting House where it has remained ever since.

The awards were first announced with an invitation for entries on 24 October 2011, and the shortlisted nominees revealed on 10 January 2012. The inaugural ceremony took place on 29 January 2012 and proved hugely successful. Prior to this, there was no official awards ceremony to recognise audio dramas; the Sony Radio Academy Awards mainly encompassed radio shows and presenters while the Richard Imison Award (for best original script by a new writer) and Tinniswood Award (for best audio drama script of the year) were awarded separately. The Imison and Tinniswood Awards are now incorporated into the Audio Drama Awards, the former administered by the Society of Authors and the latter by both the Society of Authors and the Writers' Guild of Great Britain.

== Nominations and judges ==
Although nominations are dominated by the BBC's in-house arts-oriented stations, particularly BBC Radio 3 and BBC Radio 4, entries are open to all makers of audio drama world-wide.

The judges include personalities from both the radio, acting and theatre industry and the literary world. Notable judges have included British dramatist Nell Leyshon, American novelist Stephen Wright, performance historian Viv Gardner, English actor Robert Bathurst, long-time producer and Director-General of the BBC Lord Hall, comedian Alexei Sayle, actress Imogen Stubbs and Royal Shakespeare Company associate director Rupert Goold.

== Winners ==
=== 2025 ===
14th annual awards – Host: Miles Jupp
Award	Winner	Other finalists
Outstanding Contribution	Bill Dare; Central Intelligence	—N/a
Best Original Single Drama	The Invitation by Katherine Chandler Producer: John Norton (BBC Audio Wales & West)	Commendation: Franz and Felice by Ed Harris; Producer: Sasha Yevtushenko (BBC Studios Audio London); Nearly Light by Kit Withington; Producer: Jelena Budimir (Naked Productions)
Best Original Series or Serial	Life Lines by Al Smith Producer: Sally Avens (BBC Studios Audio London) for BBC Radio 4	Central Intelligence by Greg Haddrick, Felicity Packard and Maryam Master; Producers: John Scott Dryden, Emma Hearn and Jeremy Fox (Goldhawk Productions); Money Gone by Ed Sellek; Producers: Eloise Whitmore and Tony Churnside (Naked Productions)
Best Adaptation	Tam O’Shanter by Robert Burns Adapted by Gary McNair Producer: Kirsty Williams (BBC Audio Scotland)	Commendation: Love and Information by Caryl Churchill; Producers: Mary Peate and Jessica Dromgoole (Hooley Productions) for BBC Radio 4); Antigone by Jean Anouilh; Adapted and produced by Pauline Harris (BBC Studios Audio London)
Best Actor	Sean Bean (Antigone)	Thomas Brodie-Sangster (Unsinkable); Wil Johnson (Talawa Stories)
Best Actress	Cecilia Appiah (Oleanna)	Commendation: Michelle Fairley (Hello, I Appear to Have Killed My Husband); Commendation: Kate O’Flynn (Spores)
Best Comedy Performance	Rosie Cavaliero (The Train at Platform 4)	Heath McIvor (Randy Feltface’s Destruction Manual); Frank Skinner (Do Gooders)
The Marc Beeby Award for Best Debut Performance	Mae Munuo (Tribe of Two)	Bel Odawa (A Grain of Wheat); Emma Leah Golding (Almonds and Raisins)
Best Sitcom or Comedy Drama	Rum Punch by Travis Jay Producer: Daisy Knight	Call Jonathan Pie – The American Dream Part 2 by Tom Walker with Daniel Abelson and Will Franken; Producer: Alison Vernon-Smith (Yada-Yada Audio Productions); Crybabies Present… Bagbeard by Michael Clarke, James Gault and Ed Jones; Producer: Joe Nunnery (Boffola Pictures)
Best Stand Up or Sketch Comedy	Janey Godley: the C Bomb Series 2 by Janey Godley with Ashley Storrie Producer: Richard Melvin (Dabster Productions) for BBC Radio 4	Commendation: Munya Chawawa’s Election Doom Scroll by Munya Chawawa, Matthew Crosby, James Farmer, and Joe McArdle; Producers: Jo Maney and Ben Wicks (Expectation TV) for BBC Radio 4; Mark Steel’s in Town by Mark Steel and Pete Sinclair; Producer: Carl Cooper (BBC Studios Audio)
Best Use of Sound	Restless Dreams, sound by Eloise Whitmore Producers: Eloise Whitmore and Polly Thomas (Naked Productions) for BBC Radio 4	
Best European Drama	The Fall of Lapinville by Benjamin Abitan Producer: Chloé Asous-Plunian for Arte Radio, France	Night Flights by Philippe Verkinderen; Producer: Grietkin Deroo, Minds Meet & VRT Max Belgium; The Sister of Job by Marta Rebzda; Producer: Beata Jankowska, Polish Radio Theatre
Best Podcast Audio Drama	The Skies Are Watching, written and produced by Jon Frechette and Todd Luoto (Goldhawk Productions) for BBC Radio 4	Commendation: Central Intelligence by Greg Haddrick; Producers: John Scott Dryden and Emma Hearn (Goldhawk Productions); Executive producer: Howard Stringer and Jeremy Fox, for BBC Radio; Doctor Who – the Eleventh Doctor Chronicles by Georgia Cook, Max Kashevsky and Alfie Shaw; Producer: Alfie Shaw, Big Finish Productions
Imison Award	Tether by Isley Lynn Produced by Fay Lomas (BBC Audio Wales and West) for BBC Radio 4	Tribe of Two by Malaika Kegode; Producers: Jesse Fox and Nicolas Jackson (Afonica Productions); The Mini-Break by Chloe Myerson; Producer: Anne Isger (BBC Studios Audio, London); Under Milk Woods: Tywyn by Manon Steffan Ros; Producer: Emma Harding (BBC Audio Wales and West)
Tinniswood Award	Man Friday by Edson Burton Producer: Mary Ward-Lowery (BBC Audio Wales and West) for BBC Radio 4	Southall Uprising by Satinder Chohan; Producer: Nadia Molinari (BBC Studios Audio North); A Tale of Ossian by Robert Forrest; Producer: Kirsty William (BBC Audio Scotland); Orwell v Kafka: Restless Dreams by Don Rebellat; Producer: Polly Thomas (Naked Productions)

=== 2024 ===
The ceremony took place on 24 March 2024 at salty springs featuring agent jonsey and covered audio dramas broadcast between 1 October 2022 and 31 October 2023 or first uploaded / published / released for free listening online during the same period.

13th annual awards – Host: Meera Syal
Award	Winner	Other finalists
Lifetime Achievement	Graeme Garden	–
Outstanding Contribution	Oliver Emanuel	
Best Actor	Hiran Abeysekera (Dear Harry Kane); Director: Sally Avens (BBC Audio Drama London)	Commendation: Lorn Macdonald (Confessions of a Justified Sinner) Director: Kirsty Williams (BBC Scotland); Tim McInerny (Benny & Hitch) Director: Tracey Neale (BBC Audio Drama London)
Best Actress	Rosamund Pike (People Who Knew Me); Director: Daniella Isaacs (Merman)	Gabrielle Brooks (Bess Loves Porgy) Director: Michael Buffong (feral inc); Maxine Peake (The Women of Troy) Director: Nadia Molinari (BBC Audio Drama North)
Best Supporting Performance	Mark Heap (Kafka’s Dick); Directors: Polly Thomas and Dermot Daly (Naked Productions)	Sacha Dhawan (Anna Karenina) Director: Nadia Molinari (BBC Audio Drama North)
The Marc Beeby Award for Best Debut Performance	Rosalind Eleazar (Hindsight ) Director: Gaynor Macfarlane (BBC Scotland)	Commendation: Jadie Rose Hobson (Exposure) Director: Anne Isger (BBC Audio Drama London); Commendation: Dan Parr (The Test Batter Can’t Breathe) Director: Tracey Neale (BBC Audio Drama London)
Best Audio Drama (Single drama)	Dear Harry Kane by James Fritz; Producer: Sally Avens (BBC Audio Drama London)	Benny and Hitch by Andrew McCaldon Producers: Neil Varley and Tracey Neale (BBC Audio Drama London); Eat and Run by Paolo Chianta Producer: Lorna Newman (BBC Audio Drama North)
Best Audio Drama (Series or Serial)	Trust by Jonathan Hall; Producer: Gary Brown (BBC Audio Drama North)	Commendation: There’s Something I Need to Tell You by John Scott Dryden and Misha Kawnel Producer: Emma Hearn (Goldhawk Productions); Flirties by Jess Hamilton Producer: Jess Hamilton (Audiocraft)
Best Audio Drama (Adaptation)	Bess Loves Porgy by Edwin DuBose Heyward adapted by Roy Williams; Producer: Gill Parry (feral inc)	Commendation: If on a Winter’s Night a Traveller by Italo Calvino, adapted by Tim Crouch and Toby Jones Producer: Nadia Molinari (BBC Audio Drama North); Commendation: Beowulf Retold based on the version by Seamus Heaney Producer: Pauline Harris (BBC Audio Drama London)
Best Use of Sound in an Audio Drama	Hamlet Noir by David Chilton, Lucinda Mason Brown, Weronika Andersen; Producers: Charlotte Melén, Carl Prekopp and Saskia Black (Almost Tangible)	The Dark is Rising by Gareth Fry Producers: Catherine Bailey and Tim Bell (Catherine Bailey Productions and Complicité); The Women of Troy by Sharon Hughes Producers: Nadia Molinari (BBC Audio Drama North)
Best Stand-up Comedy	Are You a Boy or a Girl? by Sarah Keyworth (additional material: Ruby Clyde); Producer: Georgia Keating (BBC Studios Audio)	Commendation: The C Bomb by Janey Godley Producers: Julia Sutherland and Richard Melvin (Dabster Productions); OK Computer by Olga Koch and Charlie Dinkin Producer: Benjamin Sutton (BBC Studios Audio)
Best Sitcom or Comedy Drama	Where to, Mate? devised by Jo Enright, Peter Slater, Abdullah Afzal, Nina Gilligan, Andy Salthouse, Keith Carter and Jason Wingard; Producer: Carl Cooper (BBC Studios Audio)	Call Jonathan Pie by Tom Walker Producer: Alison Vernon-Smith (Yada-Yada Audio); She Stoops to Conquer by Oliver Goldsmith, adapted by Barunka O’Shaughnessy Producer: Emma Harding (BBC Cymru Wales)
Best European Drama	This Word by Marta Rebzda; Producer: Waldemar Modestowicz (Polish Radio Theatre)	Faust (I Never Read It) by Noam Brusilovsky Producer: Andrea Oetzmann (SWR Südwestrundfunk with Deutschlandfunk); The Supervisor by Nis-Momme Stockmann Producer: Michael Becker (NDR Norddeutscher Rundfunk)
Best Podcast or Online Only Audio Drama	Badger and the Blitz by Richard Turley and Darren Francis; Producer: Richard Turley (ROXO)	The Salvation by Justin Lockey, Jeffrey Aidoo, and AK Benedict Producers: Jon Hamm and Boz Temple-Morris (Holy Mountain and Free Turn); Tagged by Brett Neichin and John Scott Dryden Producer: Emma Hearn (Sony Music Entertainment and Goldhawk Productions)
Imison Award	Benny and Hitch by Andrew McCaldon; Producers: Neil Varley and Tracey Neale (BBC Audio Drama London)	Happy Hour by Liv Fowler Producer: Jelena Budimir (Naked Productions); In Moderation by Katie Bonna Producer: Sally Avens (BBC Audio Drama London)
Tinniswood Award	Cracking by Shôn Dale-Jones; Producer: John Norton (BBC Cymru Wales)	About a Dog by Huw Brentnall Producer: Fiona McAlpine (Allegra Productions); Ghosted by Lindsay Sharman Director: Lindsay Sharman (Long Cat Media); Scooters, Shooters and Shottas by John R. Gordon Director: Rikki Beadle-Blair (Urban Wolf for Team Angelica/The Art Machine)

=== 2023 ===
The ceremony took place on 19 March 2023 and covered audio dramas broadcast between 1 October 2021 and 31 October 2022 or first uploaded / published / released for free listening online during the same period. 2023 marked the centenary of the audio and radio drama genre at the BBC.

12th annual awards – Host:
Award	Winner	Other finalists
Lifetime Achievement	Martin Jarvis	–
Outstanding Contribution	Radio Drama Company, 1923–2023	–
Best Actor	Anton Lesser (One Five Seven Years); Director: Nicolas Jackson (Afonica for BBC Radio 4 & BBC Sounds)	Alfred Enoch (Darkness) Director: Nadia Molinari (BBC Audio Drama North); Toby Jones (The Miser) Director: Emma Harding (BBC Cymru Wales)
Best Actress	Mary Murray (The Pride of Parnell Street); Director: Jim Culleton (BBC Audio Drama London for BBC Radio 3)	Ruth Everett (Spice) Director: Toby Swift (BBC Audio Drama London); Danielle Vitalis (Faith, Hope and Glory) Director: Anastasia Osei-Kuffour (BBC Audio Drama London)
Best Supporting Performance	Matthew Gravelle (Fault Lines: Blood); Director: Gary Brown (BBC Audio Drama North for BBC Radio 4)	Conleth Hill (Dead Hand) Director: Michael Shannon (BBC Northern Ireland); Commendation: Josie Lawrence (Thanks a Lot, Milton Jones!) Director: David Tyler (Pozzitive)
The Marc Beeby Award for Best Debut Performance	Gareth Elis (Tremolo); Director: Zoe Waterman (Illumine Theatre)	Natalie Davis (The War after the War) Director: Johnny Vegas (Woolyback Productions); Evie Hargreaves (Miss Nobody) Director: Pauline Harris (BBC Audio Drama North)
Best Audio Drama (Single drama)	End of Transmission by Anita Sullivan; Producer: Karen Rose (Sweet Talk for BBC Radio 4)	Daughter by Testament Producer: Gary Brown (BBC Audio Drama North); Solomon Browne by Callum Mitchell Producer: James Robinson (BBC Cymru Wales)
Best Audio Drama (Series or Serial)	Exemplar by Ben Ringham, Max Ringham and Dan Rebellato; Producers: Jade Lewis and Polly Thomas (Reduced Listening for BBC Radio 4 and BBC Sounds)	Song of the Reed by Steve Waters Producer: Boz Temple-Morris (Holy Mountain); This Thing of Darkness by Lucia Haynes, Eileen Horne and Anita Vettesse Producers: Gaynor Macfarlane and Kirsty Williams (BBC Scotland)
Best Audio Drama (Adaptation)	Brick Lane by Monica Ali adapted by Tanika Gupta; Producer: Anne Isger (BBC Audio Drama London for BBC Radio 4)	Commendation: Berlin Alexanderplatz by Alfred Döblin, adapted by Simon Scardifield Producers: Marc Beeby and Emma Harding, David Hunter and Gemma Jenkins (BBC Audio Drama London); North and South by Elizabeth Gaskell adapted by Lin Coghlan Producer: Sally Avens (BBC Audio Drama London)
Best Use of Sound in an Audio Drama	Town is by the Sea by Ross Flight; Producers: Eleanor Turney, George Warren, Patrick Eakin Young (Soundworlds)	Commendation: Ariel and Winter Trees by Jon Nicholls Producer: Charlotte Melén (Almost Tangible); Berlin Alexanderplatz by Alison Craig, Anne Bunting, Keith Graham and Caleb Knightley Producers: Marc Beeby and Emma Harding, David Hunter and Gemma Jenkins (BBC Audio Drama London)
Best Scripted Comedy (Longform)	Ken Cheng: Chinese Comedian by Ken Cheng; Producer: Rajiv Karia (BBC Studios for BBC Radio 4)	The Downing Street Doppelganger by Jim Poyser Producer: Gary Brown (BBC Audio Drama North); Tudur Owen: United Nations of Anglesey by Tudur Owen Producer: Richard Morris (BBC Studios)
Best Scripted Comedy (Sketch show)	Please Use Other Door by Kat Butterfield, Dan Audritt, Sophie Dickson, Laura Major, Rob Darke, Alex Nash, Sam South, Ed Amsden, Tom Coles, Cody Dahler, Toby Williams, Ed Tew, Anna Goodman, Imogen Andrews, Matt Harrison, Carwyn Blayney, Natasha Dhanraj, Alice Etches, Nathalie Antonia, Chris Ryman, Simon Alcock, Leigh Douglas, Chazz Redhead, Paul F Taylor, Jo Wiggins, Cameron Loxdale, Lewis Cook, Owen Petty, Tom Oxenham, Rebecca Heitlinger and Bill Dare; Producer: Bill Dare (BBC Studios for BBC Radio 4)	The Skewer by Jon Holmes, Tony Churnside and The Skewer Contributing Team Producer: Jon Holmes (Unusual Productions); Thanks a Lot, Milton Jones! by Milton Jones, James Cary and Dan Evans Producer: David Tyler (Pozzitive)
Best European Drama	The Sixties by Ema Stere, adapted and directed by Mihnea Chelaru; Producer: Oana Cristea Grigorescu (Radio Romania)	Burning by Sudabeh Mohafez, adapted by Matěj Samec Producer: Lenka Veverková (CZR Czech Radio); Let Me Tell You by Marta Rebzda Producer: Beata Jankowska (Polskie Radio)
Best Podcast or Online Only Audio Drama	The System by Ben Lewis; Producer: Kirsty Williams (BBC Scotland for BBC Radio 4 & BBC Sounds)	Acid Dream by Tim Price Producer: James Robinson (BBC Radio Wales); Work by Joana Nastari Producers: Ellen Spence, Eleanor Turney, George Warren, Patrick Eakin Young (Soundworlds)
Imison Award	Making of a Monster by Connor Allen; Producer: Emma Harding (BBC Cymru Wales for BBC Radio 4)	Knock of the Ban Sithe by Kenny Boyle Producer: Bruce Young (BBC Scotland for BBC Radio 4); The A-Z of Things: M is for Mussels by Lara Barbier Producer: Becky Ripley (BBC Bristol for BBC Radio 3)
Tinniswood Award	End of Transmission by Anita Sullivan; Producer: Karen Rose (Sweet Talk Productions for BBC Radio 4)	A Close Approximation of You by Oliver Emanuel Producer: Kirsty Williams (BBC Scotland for BBC Radio 4); Waterloo Station by Katie Hims Producer: Mary Peate (BBC Audio Drama London for BBC Radio 4); Strings by Linda Marshall Griffiths Producer: Nadia Molinari ( BBC Audio Drama North for BBC Radio 3)

=== 2022 ===
The ceremony took place on 25 March 2022 and covered audio dramas broadcast between 1 October 2020 and 31 October 2021 or first uploaded / published / released for free listening online during the same period. 2022 marked the return as an in-person event after COVID-19 restrictions were lifted, it also saw the return of the Best Supporting Performance and Lifetime Achievement awards after an absence of three years.

11th annual awards – Host: Andy Zaltzman
Award	Winner	Other finalists
Lifetime Achievement	Miriam Margolyes	–
Outstanding Contribution	Sioned Wiliam, Commissioning Editor, Comedy, BBC Radio 4	–
Best Actor	Edmund Davies (The Pursuits of Darleen Fyles); Director: Pauline Harris (BBC Audio Drama North)	Simon Russell Beale (Folk) Director: Sue Roberts (BBC Audio Drama North); Giles Terera (The Meaning of Zong) Director: Tom Morris (Jonx Productions)
Best Actress	Juliet Aubrey (Dead Weather); Director: Nicolas Jackson (Afonica)	Commendation: Jasmine Hyde (Little Blue Lines) Director: Gemma Jenkins (BBC Audio Drama London); Amanda Lawrence (Folk) Director: Sue Roberts (BBC Audio Drama North)
Best Supporting Performance	Claire Price (Dead Weather); Director: Nicolas Jackson (Afonica)	Paul Chahidi (Rodgers and Hart and Hammerstein) Director: Abigail le Fleming (BBC Audio Drama London); Joanne Whalley (Sweeney Todd and String of Pearls) Director: Rosalind Ayres (Jarvis & Ayres Productions)
The Marc Beeby Award for Best Debut Performance	Saran Morgan (Release); Director: John Norton (BBC Cymru Wales)	Ray Castleton (Cornerstone) Director: Gemma Jenkins (BBC Audio Drama London); Jacoba Williams (Precious Little Thing) Director: Anastasia Osei-Kuffour (Talawa / Feral inc)
Best Audio Drama (Single drama)	Dead Weather by Hattie Naylor; Producer: Nicolas Jackson (Afonica)	Life is a Radio in the Dark by Will Eno Producer: Sally Avens (BBC Audio Drama London); You & Me by Dan Rebellato Producer: Polly Thomas and Eloise Whitmore (Naked Productions)
Best Audio Drama (Series or Serial)	Life Lines by Al Smith; Producer: Sally Avens (BBC Audio Drama London)	London Particular by Nick Perry Producer: Sasha Yevtushenko (BBC Audio Drama London); Commendation: The System by Ben Lewis Producer: Kirsty Williams (BBC Scotland)
Best Audio Drama (Adaptation)	The Jungle Book by Rudyard Kipling, adapted by Ayeesha Menon; Producers: Nadir Khan & Ayeesha Menon (Goldhawk Productions)	Mr Waring of the BBC by Freddie Phillips, adapted from various sources Producer: Gemma Jenkins (BBC Audio Drama London); The Rainbow by D. H. Lawrence, adapted by Linda Marshall Griffiths Producer: Nadia Molinari (BBC Audio Drama North)
Best Use of Sound in an Audio Drama	The Meaning of Zong by Jon Nicholls, Jonquil Panting, Giles Terera; Producer: Jonquil Panting (Jonx Productions)	Creation of the Birds by Sami El-Enany Producer: Sami El-Enany (Falling Tree); Commendation: U.ME: the Musical by Steve Levine Producers: Lewis Borg-Cardona and Steve Levine (Magnum Opus Broadcasting)
Best Scripted Comedy (Longform)	Mortal by Bridget Christie; Producer: Carl Cooper (BBC Studios)	God Squad by Jack Chisnall and Barney Fishwick Producer: David Tyler (Pozzitive); OK Computer by Olga Koch and Charlie Dinkin with additional material by Rajiv Karia Producer: Benjamin Sutton (BBC Studios)
Best Scripted Comedy (Sketch show)	Sound Heap by John-Luke Roberts, with Amy Gledhill & Chris Cantrill, Cariad Lloyd, Charlie George, Deborah Frances-White, Gareth Gwynn, Katherine Parkinson, Katy Brand, Ken Cheng, Kieran Hodgson, Paddy Gervers, Ruth Bratt, Sooz Kempner, Tom Allen, Tom Neenan, Toussaint Douglass, Saima Ferdows; Producer: Ed Morrish (Lead Mojo)	Drop the Dead Panda by Evelyn Mok, Ken Cheng, Amille Jampa-Ngoen, Vivian Xie, Joanne Lao and Bruce Tang Producer: Sam Michell (BBC Studios); Emergency Broadcast by Gemma Arrowsmith Producer: Victoria Lloyd (BBC Studios)
Best European Drama	The Lion by Martin Algus, adapted by Andres Noormets; Producer: Andres Noormets (ERR Estonian Public Broadcasting)	Down by Law by Mila Čuljak Producer: Katja Šimunić (HRT Croatian Radio); Nutshell by Ian McEwan, adapted by Eva Blechová Producer: Klará Novotná (CZR Czech Radio)
Best Podcast or Online Only Audio Drama	Passenger List (series 2) by John Scott Dryden, Lauren Shippen, Meghan Fitzmartin, Janina Matthewson, Sarah Lot and Mark Henry Phillips; Producers: John Scott Dryden and Emma Hearn (Goldhawk Productions, PRX Radiotopia)	Blis-ta by Sonya Hale Producer: Mimi Findlay (Clean Break for Spotify); The Cipher by Brett Neichin and Janina Matthewson Producers: John Scott Dryden and Emma Hearn (Goldhawk Productions)
Imison Award	The Lemonade Lads by Faebian Averies; Producer: James Robinson (BBC Cymru Wales for BBC Radio)	The Chronicles of Wild Hollow by Harvey Badger, Angus Maxwell and Christian Powlesland Producer: Shouting is Funny for Spotify; Welcome to Medpatch by Kev Core Producer: Gary Brown (BBC Radio 4); Yellow Lips by Katie Redford Producer: Tracey Neale (Radio 4)
Tinniswood Award	Blis-ta by Sonya Hale; Producer: Mimi Findlay (Clean Break for Spotify)	Life is a Radio in the Dark by Will Eno Producer: Sally Avens (BBC Audio Drama London / BBC Radio 3); The Piper by Vickie Donoghue & Natalie Mitchell Producers: Kate Rowland and Russell Finch (Somethin' Else / BBC Sounds)

=== 2021 ===
Due to the COVID-19 pandemic the ceremony was held virtually taking place on 26 March 2021 and covering audio dramas first broadcast between 1 October 2019 and 31 October 2020 – or first uploaded / published for free listening online during the same period. With the restrictions having also impacted programme-making a one-off The Year of Reinvention Award replaced the Best Director Award. For the third year in succession no awards for Lifetime Achievement or Best Supporting Performance were bestowed this year.

10th annual awards – Host: John Wilson
Award	Winner	Other finalists
Outstanding Contribution	The studio managers, technicians, sound engineers and designers, R&D engineers and all technical staff working on BBC-produced and independent audio drama and comedy productions	–
Best Actor	David Threlfall (Happiness!); Director: Gemma Jenkins (BBC Radio Drama London for BBC Radio 4)	Robin Laing (This Thing of Darkness) Directors: Gaynor Macfarlane and Kirsty Williams (BBC Scotland); Matthew Needham (Othello) Director: Emma Harding (BBC Radio Drama London)
Best Actress	Maggie Steed (Suffer Little Children); Director: Jessica Dromgoole (BBC Radio Drama London for BBC Radio 4)	Shauna Macdonald (This Thing of Darkness) Directors: Gaynor Macfarlane and Kirsty Williams (BBC Scotland); Marcia Warren (24 Kildare Road) Director: Mary Peate (BBC Radio Drama London)
Best Debut Performance	Jordan Nash (Oliver: Lagos to London); Director: Michael Buffong (Feral inc. for BBC Radio 4)	Dan Krikler (Unicorns, Almost) Director: John Retallack (The Story of Books); Valentine Olukoga (Half of a Yellow Sun) Director: Nadia Molinari (BBC Radio Drama North)
Best Audio Drama (Single drama)	Magnitsky the Musical by Robert Hudson and Johnny Flynn; Producer: Sasha Yevtushenko (BBC Radio Drama London for BBC Radio 3)	Eight Point Nine Nine by James Fritz Producer: Becky Ripley (BBC Bristol); Commendation: The Likes of Us by Roy Williams Producer: Mary Peate (BBC Radio Drama London for BBC Radio 3)
Best Audio Drama (Series or Serial)	Broken English by Shelagh Stephenson; Producer: Eoin O’Callaghan (Big Fish Radio Productions for BBC Radio 4)	24 Kildare Road by Katie Hims Producer: Mary Peate (BBC Radio Drama London); Body Horror by Lucy Catherine Producer: Toby Swift (BBC Radio Drama London)
Best Audio Drama (Adaptation)	The Voyage of the St. Louis by Daniel Kehlmann, adapted by Tom Stoppard; Producer: Sasha Yevtushenko (BBC Radio Drama London for BBC Radio 4)	Grossman's War: Stalingrad by Vasily Grossman, adapted by Jonathan Myerson & Mike Walker Producer: Jonquil Panting (BBC Cymru Wales); Oliver: Lagos to London based on Charles Dickens, adapted by Ayeesha Menon Producer Gill Parry (Feral inc.)
Best Use of Sound in an Audio Drama	The Grey Man and Other Lost Legends, sound by Steve Bond; Producers: Joby Waldman and Steve Bond (Reduced Listening for BBC Radio 4)	Commendation: Cane, sound by Nigel Lewis Producer: John Norton (BBC Cymru Wales for BBC Radio 4); Over and Out (Murmurs episode 1), sound by Catherine Robinson Producers: James Robinson, John Norton, Helen Perry and David Devereux (BBC Cymru Wales)
Best Scripted Comedy (Longform)	The Musical Life of Boudicca... by Dan Kiss and Dave Cribb; Producers: Dave Cribb and Tom Price (The Rubber Chicken for BBC Radio Wales)	Alone by Moray Hunter Producer: Gordon Kennedy (Absolutely Productions); Tristram Shandy: In Development by Christopher Douglas Producer: Gary Brown (BBC Radio Drama North)
Best Scripted Comedy (Sketch show)	The Skewer by Jon Holmes; Producer: Jon Holmes (Unusual Productions for BBC Radio 4)	Agendum by Jason Hazeley and Joel Morris Producer: David Tyler (Pozzitive); The Lenny Henry Show by Tasha Dhanraj, Max Davis, Nathan Bryon and Tom Melia, Nathan Roberts, Athena Kugblenu, Michael Odewale and Kim Fuller Producer: Sam Michell (Douglas Road Productions and Tiger Aspect)
Best European Drama	Earthquake by Janko Polić Kamov; Producer: Katja Šimunić (HRT Croatian Radio)	Holidays from Suicide: a Fantastic Journey with Iggy Pop by Birgit Kempker and Anatol Atonal Producers: Birgit Kempker and Anatol Atonal (SRF, Switzerland); In Winter by Magda Woitzuck, Ida Schön, Hanno Millesi, Mark von Schlegell, Ann Cotten, Puneh Ansari Producers: Christian Lerch and Philip Scheiner (ORF, Austria)
Best Podcast or Online Only Audio Drama	Unwell: a Midwestern Gothic Mystery by Jim McDoniel, Jessica Best, Jessica Wright Buha and Bilal Dardai; Producers: Jeffrey Nils Gardner and Eleanor Hyde (HartLife NFP)	Murmurs by Janina Matthewson, Beth Crane, Tom Crowley, Greer Ellison, Eno Mfon, Jesse Schwenk, Chris Sugden, Jen Sugden, and Robert Valentine Producers: James Robinson, John Norton, Helen Perry and David Devereux (BBC Cymru Wales); Tribulation by Adam Jahnke Producer: Greg Cooler (ListenUp Audio)
The Year of Reinvention Award	Lockdown Theatre Festival; Producers: Bertie Carvel, Jeremy Mortimer, Steve Bond, Jack Howson and Joby Waldman (Reduced Listening for BBC Radio 3 and BBC Radio 4)	Commendation: Connections Producer: Polly Thomas (Naked Productions for BBC Radio 4); Commendation: The Plague Producer: Turan Ali (Bona Broadcasting for BBC Radio 4)
Imison Award	Maynard by Fraser Ayres; Producer: Mel Harris (BBC Radio 4)	Scoop McDoolie by Isaac Fisher Producer: Naala Vanslembrouck (Apple Podcasts); LoveSick by Ella Skolimowski Producer: Julius Beltrame (Apple Podcasts)
Tinniswood Award	Tristram Shandy: In Development by Christopher Douglas; Producer: Gary Brown (BBC Radio Drama North for BBC Radio 4)	Just the Three of Us by Becky Prestwich Producer: Pauline Harris (BBC Radio 4); This Thing of Darkness (episode 7) by Anita Vettesse with Eileen Horne Producer: Gaynor Macfarlane and Kirsty Williams (BBC Radio 4); Shrapnel by Isabel Wright Producer: Gaynor Macfarlane (BBC Radio 4)

=== 2020 ===
The ceremony took place on 2 February 2020 and covers audio dramas first broadcast between 1 October 2018 and 31 October 2019 – or first uploaded / published for free listening online during the same period. For the second year in succession no awards for Lifetime Achievement or Best Supporting Performance were bestowed this year.

9th annual awards – Host: Meera Syal
Award	Winner	Other finalists
Outstanding Contribution	The Amazing Maya Angelou, dramatised by Patricia Cumper, Janice Okoh and Winsome Pinnock; Producer/Director: Pauline Harris (BBC Cymru Wales and BBC Radio Drama North for BBC Radio 4)	–
Best Actor	Stephen Dillane (Sea Longing); Director: Jo McInnes (Sweet Talk for BBC Radio 3)	Sule Rimi (I Am Kanye West) Director: John Norton (BBC Cymru Wales for BBC Radio 4); Stanley Townsend (The Macefield Plot) Director: David Hunter (BBC Radio Drama London for BBC Radio 4)
Best Actress	Rebecca Front (Love in Recovery); Director: Ben Worsfield (King Bert for BBC Radio 4)	Katherine Kelly (A Badge) Director: Tony Pitts (Savvy Productions for BBC Radio 4); Lydia Wilson (Black Water: An American Story) Director: Gaynor Macfarlane (BBC Scotland for BBC Radio 4)
Best Debut Performance	George Kent (A Kestrel for a Knave); Director: Fiona McAlpine (Goldhawk Essential for BBC Radio 4)	Nadia Clifford (Good News Stories) Director: Mary Peate (BBC Radio Drama London for BBC Radio 4); Sade Malone (Torn) Director: Gary Brown (BBC Radio Drama North for BBC Radio 4)
Best Director	Mary Ward-Lowery (Talk to Me: H. P. Lovecraft) (BBC Bristol for BBC Radio 4)	Mair Bosworth (Deaf Republic) (BBC Bristol for BBC Radio 4); Nicolas Jackson and Steve Bond (Savages) (Afonica for BBC Radio 4)
Best Audio Drama (Single drama)	Sea Longing by Elizabeth Kuti; Producer: Karen Rose (Sweet Talk for BBC Radio 3)	The Invisible by Linda Marshall Griffiths Producer: Nadia Molinari (BBC Radio Drama North for BBC Radio 3); Torn by Eve Steele Producer: Gary Brown (BBC Radio Drama North for BBC Radio 4)
Best Audio Drama (Series or Serial)	Life Lines by Al Smith; Producer: Sally Avens (BBC Radio Drama London for BBC Radio 4)	D for Dexter by Amanda Whittington Producer: Mary Ward-Lowery (BBC Bristol for BBC Radio 4); Undercover Mumbai (series 3) by Ayeesha Menon Producers: John Scott Dryden and Nadir Khan (Goldhawk Productions for BBC Radio 4)
Best Audio Drama (Adaptation)	Black Water: An American Story by Joyce Carol Oates, adapted by Sarah Wooley; Producer: Gaynor Macfarlane (BBC Scotland for BBC Radio 4)	Body Tourists by Jane Rogers Producer: Clive Brill (Brill Productions for BBC Radio 4); Orlando by Virginia Woolf, adapted by Caroline Bird, Amanda Dalton, Zena Edwards, Hannah Silva and Karen McCarthy Woolf Producer: Nadia Molinari (BBC Radio Drama North for BBC Radio 3)
Best Use of Sound in an Audio Drama	The Invisible, sound by Steve Brooke with Sharon Hughes; Producer: Nadia Molinari (BBC Radio Drama North for BBC Radio 3)	An Angel in Miami, sound by Steve Bond Producers: Joby Waldman and Steve Bond (Reduced Listening for BBC Radio 4); Hello Caller, sound by Michael Harrison and Alison Crawford Producer: Alison Crawford (BBC Bristol for BBC Radio 4)
Best Scripted Comedy (Longform)	Wangsplaining by Phil Wang; Producer: Matt Stronge (BBC Studios for BBC Radio 4)	Mark Steel's in Town: "The Forest of Dean" by Mark Steel and Pete Sinclair Producer: Carl Cooper (BBC Studios for BBC Radio 4); Phil Ellis is Trying by Phil Ellis and Fraser Steele Producer: Sam Michell (BBC Studios for BBC Radio 4)
Best Scripted Comedy (Sketch show)	Alexei Sayle's Imaginary Sandwich Bar by Alexei Sayle; Producer: Joe Nunnery (BBC Studios for BBC Radio 4)	Kevin Eldon Will See You Now by Kevin Eldon with Jason Hazeley and Joel Morris Producer: David Tyler (Pozzitive for BBC Radio 4); Terry Alderton's Whole Half Hour by Terry Alderton and Richard Melvin with Julia Sutherland, Paul Tonkinson, Steven Dick and Bobby Davro Producers: Al Lorraine and Richard Melvin (Dabster Productions for BBC Radio 4)
Best European Drama	Buzz Suppression – Recording Strictly off the Record by Ulrich Bassenge; Producers: Ulrich Bassenge, Martina Müller-Wallraff and Anina Barandun (WDR, Germany and SRF, Switzerland)	The Invisible by Jaroslav Havlíček, adapted by Marie Nováková and Renata Venclová Producer: Renata Venclová (CZR Czech Radio); The Lesson by Manu Barceló Producer: Miguel Deza (resonar.org and cuonda.com)
Best Podcast or Online Only Audio Drama	Passenger List by John Scott Dryden, Lauren Shippen and Mark Henry Phillips; Producer: Emma Hearn (Goldhawk Productions / Radiotopia)	Forest 404 by Timothy X Atack Producer: Becky Ripley (BBC Bristol for BBC Sounds); The Ordinary Epic by Brandon M. Crose Producer: Jordan Stillman (Crose to Home Productions)
Imison Award	Bathwater by Vicky Foster; Producer: Sue Roberts (BBC Radio Drama North for BBC Radio 4)	The Beatboxer by Testament Producer: Gary Brown (BBC Radio 4); Commendation: By God's Mercy by Colette Victor Producer: David Hunter (BBC World Service)
Tinniswood Award	The Hartlepool Spy by Ian Martin; Producer: Sam Ward (BBC Studios for BBC Radio 4)	Death of a Matriarch by Tanika Gupta Producer: Polly Thomas (BBC Radio 3); Commendation: Home Front: A Fragile Peace by Katie Hims Producer: Jessica Dromgoole (BBC Radio Drama London for BBC Radio 4)

=== 2019 ===
The ceremony took place on 3 February 2019 and covers audio dramas first broadcast between 1 October 2017 and 31 October 2018 – or first uploaded / published for free listening online during the same period. 2019 was the year when an award for Best Director was introduced as was one for Best European Drama. No awards for Lifetime Achievement or Best Supporting Performance were bestowed in this year.

8th annual awards – Host: Tracy-Ann Oberman
Award	Winner	Other finalists
Outstanding Contribution	Home Front (BBC Radio 4). Editor: Jessica Dromgoole; Core Writers: Sebastian Baczkiewicz, Lucy Catherine, Sarah Daniels, Katie Hims, Shaun McKenna, and Mike Walker	–
Best Actor	David Threlfall (Spike and the Elfin Oak); Director: Gemma Jenkins (BBC Radio Drama London for BBC Radio 4)	Liam Brennan (Five Days Which Changed Everything) Director: Kirsty Williams (BBC Scotland for BBC Radio 4); Jasper Britton (A Month of Maureen – Three Journeys) Director: Marion Nancarrow (BBC Radio Drama London for BBC Radio 4)
Best Actress	Eve Myles (19 Weeks); Director: Helen Perry (BBC Cymru Wales for BBC Radio 4)	Sudha Bhuchar (My Son the Doctor) Director: Jonquil Panting (BBC Radio Drama London for BBC Radio 4); Commendation: Sydney Wade (D for Dexter) Director: Mary Ward-Lowery (BBC Bristol for BBC Radio 4)
Best Debut Performance	Daisy Head (Love Henry James: The Golden Bowl); Directors: Nadia Molinari (BBC Radio Drama North for BBC Radio 4)	Karlo Diaz (The Beast) Directors: Nicolas Jackson and Steve Bond (Afonica for BBC Radio 4); Georgia Scholes (Billy Homeless Dies at the End) Director: Boz Temple-Morris (Holy Mountain for BBC Radio 4)
Best Director	Abigail le Fleming (The Effect) (BBC Radio Drama London for BBC Radio 3)	Commendation: Steve Bond and Judith Kampfner (Shadowbahn) (Corporation For Independent Media for BBC Radio 4); Peter Kavanagh (The Wild Duck) (BBC Radio Drama London for BBC Radio 3)
Best Audio Drama (Single drama)	County Lines by Amelia Bullmore; Producer/Director: Mary Peate (BBC Radio Drama London for BBC Radio 4)	19 Weeks by Emily Steel Producer/Director: Helen Perry (BBC Cymru Wales for BBC Radio 4); The Chosen One by Avi Garvi Producers: Nadir Khan and John Dryden (Goldhawk Productions for BBC Radio 4)
Best Audio Drama (Series or Serial)	The Truth about Hawaii by Oliver Emanuel; Producer/Director: Kirsty Williams (BBC Scotland for BBC Radio 4)	Stone by Martin Jameson, Richard Monks, Cath Staincliffe, Alex Ganley and Vivienne Harvey Producers/Directors: Nadia Molinari and Gary Brown (BBC Radio Drama North for BBC Radio 4); Tommies by Avin Shah Producers: David Hunter, Jonquil Panting and Jonathan Ruffle (BBC Radio Drama London for BBC Radio 4)
Best Audio Drama (Adaptation)	A Tale of Two Cities: Aleppo and London by Charles Dickens, adapted by Ayeesha Menon; Producers: Gill Parry and Emma Hearn (Goldhawk Productions for BBC Radio 4)	Commendation: Das Kapital by Karl Marx, adapted by Sarah Woods Producer/Director: James Robinson (BBC Cymru Wales for BBC Radio 4); Love Henry James: The Turn of the Screw by Henry James, adapted by Linda Marshall Griffiths Producer/Director: Nadia Molinari (BBC Radio Drama North for BBC Radio 4)
Best Use of Sound in an Audio Drama	Love Henry James: The Turn of the Screw, sound by Steve Brooke and John Benton; Producer/Director: Nadia Molinari (BBC Radio Drama North for BBC Radio 4)	The Beast, sound by Steve Bond Producers/Directors: Nicolas Jackson and Steve Bond (Afonica for BBC Radio 4); Unmade Movies: Dennis Potter's The White Hotel, sound by Wilfredo Acosta Producers: Laurence Bowen and Peter Ettedgui (Dancing Ledge for BBC Radio 4)
Best Scripted Comedy (Longform)	Rob Newman's Total Eclipse of Descartes by Rob Newman; Producer: John Harvey (Hat Trick Productions for BBC Radio 4)	Bridget Christie's Utopia by Bridget Christie Producers: Simon Nicholls and Alison Vernon-Smith (BBC Studios for BBC Radio 4); Tim Key's Late-Night Poetry Programme by Tim Key Producer: James Robinson (BBC Cymru Wales for BBC Radio 4)
Best Scripted Comedy (Sketch show)	John Finnemore's Souvenir Programme by John Finnemore; Producer: Ed Morrish (BBC Studios for BBC Radio 4)	Agendum by Jason Hazeley and Joel Morris Producer: David Tyler (Pozzitive for BBC Radio 4); Dead Ringers by Nev Fountain, Tom Jamieson, Laurence Howarth, Ed Amsden, Tom Coles, Sarah Campbell, James Bugg, Max Davis, Sara Gibbs, Alex Hardy, Laura Major and Lewis Cook Producer: Bill Dare (BBC Studios for BBC Radio 4)
Best European Drama	Munch and Munch – Diptych by Jasna Mesarić; Producer: Katja Šimunić (HRT Croatian Radio)	The Confession by Fyodor Dostoevsky, adapted by Doina Papp Producer/Director: Ilinca Stihi (Radio Romania); Wrapped by Tracy Martin Producer/Director: Kevin Reynolds (RTÉ)
Best Podcast or Online Only Audio Drama	Red Moon by Robert Valentine; Producer: Robert Valentine (The Wireless Theatre Company)	Commendation: ATA Girl by Gemma Page, Victoria Saxton, Helen Goldwyn and Jane Slavin Producer: Helen Goldwyn (Big Finish Productions); Commendation: Tracks: Strata by Matthew Broughton Producer/Director: James Robinson (BBC Cymru Wales for BBC Radio 4)
Imison Award	Of A Lifetime by Lulu Raczka; Producers: Polly Thomas and Eloise Whitmore (Naked Productions for BBC Radio 3)	Spike and the Elfin Oak by Ian Billings Producer: Gemma Jenkins (BBC Radio Drama London for BBC Radio 4); Double Bubble by Carl Cattermole Producer: Andrew Wilkie (National Prison Radio)
Tinniswood Award	When the Pips Stop by Oliver Emanuel; Producer: Kirsty Williams (BBC Scotland for BBC Radio 4)	Playing Dead by Vivienne Harvey Producer: Nadia Molinari (BBC Radio Drama North for BBC Radio 4); Holbein's Skull by Martyn Wade Producer: Tracey Neale (BBC Radio Drama London for BBC Radio 4)

=== 2018 ===
The ceremony took place on 28 January 2018 and covers audio dramas first broadcast in English in the UK between 1 October 2016 and 31 October 2017 – or first uploaded / published for free listening online in the UK during the same period. In 2018 the two awards for comedy were changed to become Best Scripted Comedy (Longform) and Best Scripted Comedy (Sketch show).

7th annual awards – Host: Tracy-Ann Oberman
Award	Winner	Other finalists
Lifetime Achievement	Siân Phillips	–
Outstanding Contribution	Ayeesha Menon and Midnight's Children	–
Best Actor	Nikesh Patel (Midnight's Children by Salman Rushdie), adapted by Ayeesha Menon; Producers: Tracey Neale and Emma Harding (BBC Radio Drama London for BBC Radio 4)	Commendation: John Hurt (The Invisible Man: chapter 1) (Big Finish Productions); Paapa Essiedu (Wide Open Spaces) Producer: Charlotte Riches (BBC North for BBC Radio 4)
Best Actress	Christine Bottomley (Solitary); Producers: Nicolas Jackson and Steve Bond (Afonica for BBC Radio 3)	Anastasia Hille (Long Day's Journey into Night) Producer: Celia de Wolff (Pier Productions for BBC Radio 3); Julia McKenzie (John Finnemore's Double Acts: "Mercy Dash") Producer: David Tyler (Pozzitive for BBC Radio 4)
Best Supporting Performance	Rupert Evans (Long Day's Journey into Night); Producer: Celia de Wolff (Pier Productions for BBC Radio 3)	Roger Allam (The Government Inspector) Director: Jeremy Herrin (Catherine Bailey Ltd for BBC Radio 3); Amelia Bullmore (The Beard) Producer: Alison Crawford (BBC Bristol for BBC Radio 4)
Best Debut Performance	Sabrina Sandhu (Black Eyed Girls by Katie Hims); Producer: Sasha Yevtushenko (BBC Radio Drama London for BBC Radio 4)	Andrew Leung (Prime Cut) Producer: Helen Perry (BBC Cymru Wales for BBC Radio 4); Kate Phillips (Gudrun’s Saga) Producers: Gemma Jenkins and Sasha Yevtushenko (BBC Radio Drama London for BBC Radio 4)
Best Audio Drama (Single drama)	The Red by Marcus Brigstocke; Producer: Caroline Raphael (Pier Productions for BBC Radio 4)	Commendation: Dangerous Visions: Culture by Al Smith Producer: Sally Avens (BBC Radio Drama London for BBC Radio 4); The Music Lesson by Hannah Silva Producer: Melanie Harris (Sparklab Productions for BBC Radio 4)
Best Audio Drama (Series or Serial)	Black Eyed Girls by Katie Hims; Producer: Sasha Yevtushenko (BBC Radio Drama London for BBC Radio 4)	Dangerous Visions: Resistance by Val McDermid Producer: Sue Roberts (BBC Radio Drama North for BBC Radio 4); Home Front by Katie Hims & Sarah Daniels Producer: Jessica Dromgoole (BBC Radio Drama Birmingham for BBC Radio 4)
Best Audio Drama (Adaptation)	A Clockwork Orange by Anthony Burgess; Producer: Gary Brown (BBC Radio Drama North for BBC Radio 3)	Midnight's Children by Salman Rushdie, adapted by Ayeesha Menon Producers: Tracey Neale and Emma Harding (BBC Radio Drama London for BBC Radio 4); Terrible Beauty by Gerald Doyle, adapted by Bernard Clarke Producer: Bernard Clarke (RTÉ lyric fm)
Best Use of Sound in an Audio Drama	The War of the Worlds, sound by Cal Knightley, Mike Etherden, Alison Craig; Producer: Marc Beeby (BBC Radio Drama London for BBC Radio 4)	Commendation: Dangerous Visions: Kafka's Metamorphosis, sound by Nigel Lewis Producer: James Robinson (BBC Cymru Wales for BBC Radio 4); Commendation: Midnight's Children, sound by Peter Ringrose, Anne Bunting and Jenni Burnett Producers: Tracey Neale and Emma Harding (BBC Radio Drama London for BBC Radio 4)
Best Scripted Comedy (Longform)	Australian Trilogy by Sarah Kendall; Producer: Carl Cooper (BBC Studios for BBC Radio 4)	Commendation: Ladhood by Liam Williams Producer: Joseph Nunnery (BBC Studios for BBC Radio 4); The Penny Dreadfuls Present: Le Carré on Spying by David Reed Producer: Julia McKenzie (BBC Studios for BBC Radio 4)
Best Scripted Comedy (Sketch show)	It’s Jocelyn by Jocelyn Jee Esien, Liam Beirn, Laura Major, Tom Coles, Ed Amsden and Sarah Campbell; Producer: Suzy Grant (BBC Studios for BBC Radio 4)	The Absolutely Radio Show by Morwenna Banks, Peter Baikie, Moray Hunter, Gordon Kennedy and John Sparkes Producer: Gordon Kennedy & Gus Beattie (Absolutely Gusman Production for BBC Radio 4); Harry & Paul Present: The Gentlemen's Club by Harry Enfield & Paul Whitehouse Producer: Sam Bryant (BBC Studios for BBC Radio 2)
Best Podcast or Online Only Audio Drama	Rathband: A Digital Tragedy by Christopher Hogg; Producers: Jeremy Mortimer and John Wakefield (5th Quarter)	Can't Get You Out of My Head by Charlotte Bogard Macleod Producer: David Hunter (BBC Online); Inside Donald Trump by Andy Hamilton Producers: Claire Broughton and Andy Hamilton (Hat Trick Productions for Unbound)
Imison Award	The Book of Yehudit by Adam Usden; Producer: Charlotte Riches (BBC North for BBC Radio 4)	Wide Open Spaces by Jane Wainwright Producer: Charlotte Riches (BBC North for BBC Radio 4)
Tinniswood Award	Borderland by Sarah Woods; Producer: James Robinson (BBC Cymru Wales for BBC Radio 4)	Commendation: Double Acts: "Penguin Diplomacy" by John Finnemore Producer: David Tyler (Pozzitive for BBC Radio 4); Jenny Lomas by David Eldridge Producer: Sally Avens ( BBC Radio Drama London for BBC Radio 3)

=== 2017 ===
The ceremony took place on 29 January 2017 and covers audio dramas first broadcast in English in the UK between 1 October 2015 and 31 October 2016 – or first uploaded / published for free listening online in the UK during the same period.

6th annual awards – Host: Lenny Henry
Award	Winner	Other finalists
Lifetime Achievement	Bill Nighy	–
Outstanding Contribution	The Archers	–
Best Actor	Danny Sapani (A Raisin in the Sun); Director: Pauline Harris (BBC North for BBC Radio 3)	Robert Lindsay (A Play for the Heart); Timothy Watson (The Archers)
Best Actress	Christine Bottomley (The Sky is Wider); Director: Nadia Molinari (BBC North for BBC Radio 4)	Pippa Haywood (Tess in Winter); Louiza Patikas (The Archers)
Best Supporting Performance	Valene Kane (The Stroma Sessions); Producers: Nicolas Jackson & Steve Bond (Afonica for BBC Radio 3)	Ralph Ineson (Black Dog); Joe Sims (Life Lines)
Best Debut Performance	Lee Rufford (The Loneliness of the Long-Distance Runner); Director: Carl Prekopp (Goldhawk Essential for BBC Radio 4)	Christina Ritter (North); Katie West (Oranges Are Not the Only Fruit)
Best Audio Drama (Single drama)	The Sky is Wider by Linda Marshall Griffiths; Producer: Nadia Molinari (BBC North for BBC Radio 4)	Comment is Free by James Fritz Producer: Becky Ripley (BBC Bristol for BBC Radio 4); Commendation: Jump Blue by Hannah Silva Producers: Nicolas Jackson and Steve Bond
Best Audio Drama (Series or Serial)	Life Lines by Al Smith; Producer: Sally Avens (BBC Radio Drama London for BBC Radio 4)	The Archers: "Helen’s trial week" by Tim Stimpson Editor: Sean O'Connor (BBC Radio 4); Tracks by Matthew Broughton Producers: James Robinson, Helen Perry and Abigail le Fleming
Best Audio Drama (Adaptation)	Blood, Sex and Money (episode 9) by Émile Zola, adapted by Oliver Emanuel, Martin Jameson, Lavinia Murray and Dan Rebellato; Producers: Gary Brown, Pauline Harris, Nadia Molinari, Polly Thomas, Kirsty Williams (BBC North, BBC Scotland & Sparklab Productions for BBC Radio 4)	Going Solo by Roald Dahl, adapted by Lucy Catherine Producer: Helen Perry; True West by Sam Shepard, adapted by John Peacock Producer: Celia de Wolff
Best Use of Sound in an Audio Drama	Tracks (episode 1), sound by Nigel Lewis; Producers: James Robinson, Helen Perry and Abigail le Fleming (BBC Cymru Wales for BBC Radio 4)	Mary Rose, sound by Laura Moody, Peter Ringrose, Ross Burman and Alison Craig Producer: Abigail le Fleming (BBC Radio 3); The Sky is Wider, sound by Steve Brooke Producer: Nadia Molinari (BBC North for BBC Radio 4)
Best Scripted Comedy Drama	Secret Kebabs by Christine Entwisle; Producer: Kirsty Williams (BBC Scotland for BBC Radio 4)	Guilt Trip by Felicity Montagu, Olivia Nixon and Katherine Jakeways Producer: Jane Berthoud (BBC Radio 4); Commendation: The Strange Vanishing of Julian Quark by Tom Wainwright Producer: Sasha Yevtushenko
Best Scripted Comedy (Studio Audience)	Robert Newman's Entirely Accurate Encyclopedia of Evolution by Rob Newman; Producer: Jonathan Harvey (Hat Trick Productions for BBC Radio 4)	Mae Martin's Guide to 21st Century Sexuality by Mae Martin Producer: Alex Smith (BBC Radio 4); Mark Steel's in Town: "Stockport" by Mark Steel Producer: Carl Cooper (BBC Radio 4)
Best Online or Non-Broadcast Audio drama	Doctor Who: Absent Friends by John Dorney; Producer: David Richardson (Big Finish Productions)	Baker's End: The King of Cats by Paul Magrs (Bafflegab Productions); Torchwood: More Than This by Guy Adams Producer: James Goss (Big Finish Productions)
Imison Award	Comment is Free by James Fritz; Producer: Rebecca Ripley (BBC Bristol for BBC Radio 4)	Community Service by Jonny O’Neill; The Virtues of Oblivion by James Meek
Tinniswood Award	Comment is Free by James Fritz; Producer: Rebecca Ripley (BBC Bristol for BBC Radio 4)	A History of Paper by Oliver Emanuel; The Stroma Sessions by Timothy X Atack

=== 2016 ===
The ceremony took place on 31 January 2016 and covers audio dramas first broadcast in English in the UK between 1 October 2014 and 31 October 2015 – or first uploaded / published for free listening online in the UK during the same period.

5th annual awards – Host: Lenny Henry
Award	Winner	Other finalists
Lifetime Achievement	June Whitfield	–
Outstanding Contribution	John Hurt	–
Best Actor	Alfred Molina (A View from the Bridge) (Jarvis & Ayres Productions for BBC Radio 3)	Anton Lesser (Vampyre Man); Nico Mirallegro (Orpheus and Eurydice)
Best Actress	Monica Dolan (Vincent in Brixton) (BBC Scotland for BBC Radio 4)	Eve Myles (Frank and the Bear); Sue Johnston (Love in Recovery)
Best Supporting Performance	Susan Wokoma (Three Strong Women) (BBC Cymru Wales for BBC Radio 4)	Billy Kennedy (Home Front); Mark Strong (Unmade Movies: Harold Pinter’s Victory)
Best Debut Performance	Karen Bartke (My Name is...) (BBC Scotland for BBC Radio 4)	Eleanor Tomlinson (Dead Girls Tell No Tales); Richard Hawley (Monster)
Best Audio Drama (Single play)	Cuttin’ It by Charlene James; Producer: Jessica Brown (BBC Radio Drama London for BBC Radio 4)	Dream of White Horses by Linda Marshall Griffiths Producer: Nadia Molinari; Monster by Tony Pitts Producer: Sally Harrison
Best Audio Drama (Series or Serial)	Children in Need: D for Dexter by Amanda Whittington; Producer: Mary Ward-Lowery (BBC Bristol for BBC Radio 4)	A Fine Balance by Rohinton Mistry, dramatized by Ayeesha Menon & Kewel Karim Producer: John Dryden; War and Peace by Leo Tolstoy, dramatized by Timberlake Wertenbaker Producer: Celia de Wolff
Best Audio Drama (Adaptation)	The Master and Margarita by Mikhail Bulgakov, dramatized by Lucy Catherine; Producer: Sasha Yevtushenko (BBC Radio Drama London for BBC Radio 3)	Between the Ears: Mr Rainbow by Franz Kafka, dramatized by Sebastian Baczkiewicz Producer: Joby Waldman (BBC Radio 3); King Charles III by Mike Bartlett Producer: Toby Swift
Best Use of Sound in an Audio Drama	Fugue State, sound by Julian Simpson and David Thomas; Producer: Karen Rose (Sweet Talk Productions for BBC Radio 4)	Mayday Mayday, composed by Aaron May Producer: Becky Ripley; Fright Night: Ring, sound by Catherine Robinson Producer: James Robinson
Best Scripted Comedy Drama	In and Out of the Kitchen by Justin Edwards; Producer: Sam Michell (BBC Radio Comedy for BBC Radio 4)	Cabin Pressure – Finale ("Zurich") by John Finnemore Producer: David Tyler (BBC Radio 4); The Dad Who Fell to Earth by Toby Hadoke Producer: Charlotte Riches
Best Scripted Comedy (Studio Audience)	Reluctant Persuaders (Episode 3) by Edward Rowett; Producer: Gordon Kennedy (Absolutely Productions for BBC Radio 4)	Dead Ringers by Bill Dare, Jim Farthing, Jon Culshaw, Debra Stephenson and Lewis MacLeod (BBC Radio 4); The Penny Dreadfuls Present: Macbeth Rebothered by David Reed with Humphrey Ker
Best Online or Non-Broadcast Audio drama	The Kindness of Time by Deirdre Burton and Tom Davis; Producer: Rosie Boulton (Monty Funk Productions)	Hood: King's Command by Iain Meadows Producer: Iain Meadows (Spiteful Puppet); The Omega Factor: The Old Gods by Phil Mulryne Producer: David Richardson (Big Finish Productions)
Imison Award	30 Eggs by Eoin O'Connor (BBC Northern Ireland for BBC Radio 4)	A Thing Inside a Thing Inside a Thing by Iain AJ Ross; The Churchill Barriers by Emma Spurgin Hussey
Tinniswood Award	Fugue State by Julian Simpson; Producer: Karen Rose (Sweet Talk Productions for BBC Radio 4)	Far Side of the Moore by Sean Grundy; Vampyre Man by Joseph O'Connor

=== 2015 ===
The ceremony took place on 1 February 2015 and covers audio dramas first broadcast in English in the UK between 1 October 2013 and 31 October 2014 – or first uploaded / published for free listening online in the UK during the same period. 2015 saw the two Best Supporting Performance awards merged once again into a single category covering both male and female performers, but introduced a new category; Best Debut Performance.

4th annual awards – Host: Lenny Henry
Award	Winner	Other finalists
Lifetime Achievement	Stanley Baxter	–
Outstanding Contribution	Neil Gaiman	–
Best Actor	Ian McKellen (Eugénie Grandet) by Honoré de Balzac, dramatised by Rose Tremain; Producer: Gordon House (BBC Radio 4)	Andrew Scott (Slipping) by Claudine Toutoungi Producer: Liz Webb (Radio 4); Julian Rhind-Tutt (The Real Trial of Oscar Wilde) by Nick Stafford Producer: David Hunter (Radio 4)
Best Actress	Aisling Loftus (Educator) by Hayley Squires; Producer: Helen Perry (BBC Radio 3)	Charlotte Riley (Slipping) by Claudine Toutoungi Producer: Liz Webb (Radio 4); Ellie Kendrick (How to Say Goodbye Properly) by E. V. Crowe Producer: Abigail Le Fleming (Radio 4)
Best Supporting Performance	Michelle Terry (Educator) by Hayley Squires; Producer: Helen Perry (Radio 3)	Siân Phillips (Hide The Moon) by Martyn Wade Producer: Marion Nancarrow (Radio 3); Toby Jones (Pride and Prejudice) by Jane Austen, dramatised by Charlotte Jones Producer: Sally Avens (Radio 4)
Best Debut Performance	Jade Matthew (A Kidnapping) by Andy Mulligan; Producers: John Dryden and Nadir Khan (Radio 4)	Alex Jordan (Frankenstein or The Modern Prometheus) by Mary Shelley, dramatised by Jonathan Barnes Producer: Scott Handcock (Big Finish Productions); Sam Hattersley (Magpie) by Lee Mattinson Producer: Sharon Sephton (Radio 4)
Best Audio Drama (Single play)	Everything, Nothing, Harvey Keitel by Pejk Malinovski; Producer: Pejk Malinovski (Radio 3)	Everyday Time Machines by Al Smith Producer: Sally Avens (Radio 3); Men Who Sleep in Cars by Michael Symmons Roberts Producer: Susan Roberts (Radio 4)
Best Audio Drama (Series or Serial)	Ambiguous Loss by Michael Butt; Producer: Toby Swift (Radio 4)	Holding On To You by D. L. Weller Producer: Nadia Molinari (Radio 4); The Seventh Test by Ayeesha Menon & John Dryden Producers: John Dryden and Nadir Khan (Radio 4)
Best Audio Drama (Adaptation)	Come to Grief adapted by Hannah Vincent; Producer: Gordon House (Radio 4)	Porcelain adapted by Ian Kershaw Producer: Susan Roberts (Radio 4); The Seventh Test adapted by Ayeesha Menon & John Dryden Producer: John Dryden and Nadir Khan (Radio 4)
Best Use of Sound in an Audio Drama	The Boy at the Back by Juan Mayorga, sound design by Steve Bond; Producer: Nicolas Jackson (Radio 3)	The Exorcist by William Peter Blatty, dramatised by Robert Forrest, sound design by Gary Newman Producer: Gaynor Macfarlane (Radio 4); The Illustrated Man by Ray Bradbury, dramatised by Brian Sibley, sound design by Anne Bunting Producer: Gemma Jenkins (Radio 4)
Best Scripted Comedy Drama	Lunch by Marcy Kahan; Producer: Sally Avens (Radio 4)	Believe It: Victor by Jon Canter Producer: Clive Brill (Radio 4); I'm a Believer by Jon Canter Producer: Jonquil Panting (Radio 4)
Best Scripted Comedy (Studio Audience)	John Finnemore's Souvenir Programme by John Finnemore; Producer: Ed Morrish (Radio 4)	The Brig Society by Marcus Brigstocke, Jeremy Salsby, Toby Davies, Nick Doody, Steve Punt and Dan Tetsell Producer: David Tyler (Radio 4); Trodd En Bratt Say ‘Well Done You’ by Ruth Bratt and Lucy Trodd Producer: Ben Worsfield (Radio 4)
Best Online or Non-Broadcast Audio drama	Hood: The Scribe of Sherwood by Iain Meadows; Producer: Iain Meadows (Spiteful Puppet)	The Child by Sebastian Fitzek (Audible UK); Survivors by Matt Fitton Producer: David Richardson (Big Finish Productions)
Imison Award	How To Say Goodbye Properly by E. V. Crowe	Goodbye by Morwenna Banks; The Man in the Lift by Tom Connolly; Paris, Nana and Me by Caroline Horton
Tinniswood Award	Goodbye by Morwenna Banks	The Good Listener by Fin Kennedy; Men Who Sleep in Cars by Michael Symmons Roberts

=== 2014 ===
The ceremony took place on 26 January 2014 and covers audio dramas broadcast between 1 October 2012 and 31 October 2013 or first uploaded / published for free listening online in the UK during the same period. The award for Best Scripted Comedy was split into two (Best Scripted Comedy Drama and Best Scripted Comedy – Studio Audience) and two new awards were introduced; the Lifetime Achievement award and the Outstanding Contribution award.

3rd annual awards – Host: Lenny Henry
Award	Winner	Other finalists
Lifetime Achievement	June Spencer	–
Outstanding Contribution	Claire Grove	–
Best Actor	Lee Ross (King David); Producer: Mary Peate (BBC Radio Drama London for BBC Radio 3)	Simon Russell Beale (Copenhagen) Producer: Emma Harding (BBC Radio Drama London for BBC Radio 3); Joseph Millson (The Real George Orwell: Jura) Producer: Jeremy Mortimer (BBC Radio Drama London for BBC Radio 4)
Best Actress	Christine Bottomley (My Boy); Producer: Polly Thomas (Somethin' Else for BBC Radio 4)	Carly Bawden (The Colour of Milk) Producer: Susan Roberts (BBC Radio Drama Salford for BBC Radio 4); Marcia Warren (Tony and Rose) Producer: Celia de Wolff (Pier Productions for Radio 4)
Best Supporting Actor	Shaun Dooley (The Gothic Imagination: Frankenstein); Producer: Marc Beeby (BBC Radio Drama London for Radio 4)	Geoffrey Bretton (Imaginary Boys) Producer: Scott Handcock (BBC Radio Drama Cymru/Wales for Radio 4); David Rasche (Warrior Class) Producer: Judith Kampfner (Corporation For Independent Media for Radio 4)
Best Supporting Actress	Claire Rushbrook (King David); Producer: Mary Peate (BBC Radio Drama London for Radio 3)	Lia Williams (FindthePerfectPartner4u.com) Producer: Gordon House (Goldhawk Essential for Radio 4); Lacey Turner (The One About the Social Worker) Producer: Jonquil Panting (BBC Radio Drama London for BBC Radio 4)
Best Audio Drama (Single play)	Billions by Ed Harris; Producer: Jonquil Panting (BBC Radio Drama London for Radio 4)	The Gestapo Minutes by Adam Ganz Producer: Catherine Bailey (Catherine Bailey Productions for Radio 4); The Sleeper by Michael Symmons Roberts Producer: Susan Roberts (BBC Radio Drama Salford for Radio 4)
Best Audio Drama (Series or Serial)	An Angel at My Table by Janet Frame, adapted by Anita Sullivan; Producer: Karen Rose (Sweet Talk for Radio 4)	The Pursuits of Darleen Fyles by Esther Wilson Producer: Pauline Harris (BBC Radio Drama Salford for Radio 4); Takes Two to Tandem by Lavinia Murray Producer: Sharon Sephton (BBC Radio Drama Salford for Radio 4)
Best Audio Drama (Adaptation)	Sword of Honour by Evelyn Waugh, dramatised by Jeremy Front; Producer: Sally Avens (BBC Radio Drama London for Radio 4)	The Aeneid by Virgil, dramatised by Hattie Naylor Producer: Kate McAll (BBC Cymru Wales for Radio 4); The Wind in the Willows by Kenneth Grahame, adapted by Neil Brand Producer: Ann McKay (BBC Radio Drama London for Radio 4)
Best Use of Sound in an Audio Drama	He Died with His Eyes Open; sound design by Caleb Knightley; Producer: Sasha Yevtushenko (BBC Radio Drama London for Radio 4)	Forever Mankind Producers: Judith Kampfner and Jonathan Mitchell (Corporation For Independent Media for Radio 4); Saturday Night & Sunday Morning; sound design by David Chilton Producer: Lucinda Mason Brown (Goldhawk Essential production for BBC Radio 4)
Best Scripted Comedy Drama	Love and Sweets 3: Grand Canyon by Richard Marsh; Producer: Ben Worsfield (Lucky Giant for Radio 4)	Cabin Pressure by John Finnemore Producer: David Tyler (Pozzitive for BBC Radio 4)
Best Scripted Comedy (Studio Audience)	Sketchorama: Absolutely Special by Peter Baikie, Morwenna Banks, Moray Hunter, Gordon Kennedy and John Sparkes; Producer: Gus Beattie (The Comedy Unit for BBC Radio 4)	Cabin Pressure by John Finnemore Producer: David Tyler (Pozzitive for BBC Radio 4); Love and Sweets 2: The Perfect Match by Richard Marsh Producer: Ben Worsfield (Lucky Giant for Radio 4)
Best Online or Non-Broadcast Audio drama	Doctor Who: Dark Eyes by Nicholas Briggs; Producer: Martin Montague (Big Finish Productions)	Hood: Noble Secrets by Iain Meadows Producer: Iain Meadows (Spiteful Puppet); Trimble written by Ed Greenwood Producer: John Wakefield (University Radio York)
Imison Award	The Loving Ballad of Captain Bateman by Joseph Wilde with Tim Van Eyken	Fresh Berries by Catherine Johnson; Hangdog by Cat Jones
Tinniswood Award	Marathon Tales by Colin Teevan and Hannah Silva	Commendation: Once Upon A Time There Was A Beatrix by Lavinia Murray; Dusty Won’t Play by Annie Caulfield; Imo & Ben by Mark Ravenhill

=== 2013 ===
The ceremony took place on 27 January 2013 and covered audio dramas broadcast between 1 October 2011 and 30 September 2012 or first uploaded / published for free listening online in the UK during the same period. The award for Best Audio Drama Award was split into two (Single Play and Serial) as was the award for Best Supporting Performance (Best Supporting Actor and Best Supporting Actress). The Innovation award was retired.

2nd annual awards – Host: David Tennant
Award	Winner	Other finalists
Best Actor; Presented by Penelope Wilton	Andrew Scott; Betrayal by Harold Pinter (BBC Scotland, BBC Radio 4)	Henry Goodman Ulysses by James Joyce, dramatised by Robin Brooks (Radio 4); Richard Johnson Tennyson and Edison by David Pownall (Radio 3)
Best Actress; Presented by Stephen Tompkinson	Michelle Fairley; The Grapes of Wrath by John Steinbeck, dramatised by Donna Franceschild (BBC Scotland, Radio 4)	Lorraine Ashbourne Seven Scenes by Nicola Baldwin (Radio 3); Fenella Woolgar An American Rose by Charlotte Jones (Radio 4)
Best Supporting Actor; Presented by Maxine Peake	David Troughton; Singles and Doublets by Martyn Wade (BBC Radio 3)	David Crellin Craven by Amelia Bullmore (Radio 4); Carl Prekopp Pilgrim by Sebastian Baczkiewicz (Radio 4)
Best Supporting Actress; Presented by Stephen Mangan	Vicky McClure; Kicking the Air by Christine Murphy (BBC Northern Ireland, Radio 4)	Niamh Cusack The Man with Wings by Rachel Joyce (Radio 4); Gillian Kearney Songs and Lamentations by Michael Symmons Roberts (BBC North, Radio 4)
Best Audio Drama (Single play); Presented by Lenny Henry	On It by Tony Pitts; Producer: Sally Harrison (Radio 4)	Betrayal by Harold Pinter Producer: Gaynor Macfarlane (BBC Scotland, Radio 4); Zen and the Art of Motorcycle Maintenance by Robert M. Pirsig, dramatised by Peter Flannery Producer: Melanie Harris (Radio 4)
Best Audio Drama (Series or Serial); Presented by Patricia Cumper	The Lost Honour of Katharina Blum by Heinrich Böll, abridged by Helen Meller; Producer: Polly Thomas (Radio 4)	Pink Mist by Owen Sheers Producer: Tim Dee (BBC Bristol, Radio 4); The Mumbai Chuzzlewits dramatised by Ayeesha Menon (from Martin Chuzzlewit by Charles Dickens) Producer: John Dryden (Radio 4)
Best Audio Drama (Adaptation); Presented by Nick Dear	A Doll's House by Henrik Ibsen, dramatised by Tanika Gupta; Producer: Nadia Molinari (BBC North, Radio 3)	The Mumbai Chuzzlewits dramatised by Ayeesha Menon (from Martin Chuzzlewit by Charles Dickens) Producer: John Dryden (Radio 4); Zen and the Art of Motorcycle Maintenance by Robert M. Pirsig, dramatised by Peter Flannery Producer: Melanie Harris (Radio 4)
Best Use of Sound in an Audio Drama; Presented by Siân Phillips	The Cruel Sea by Nicholas Monsarrat, dramatised by John Fletcher; Producer: Marc Beeby (Radio 4)	Use it or Lose It by Peter Blegvad Producer: Iain Chambers (Radio 3); The Chrysalids by John Wyndham, dramatised by Jane Rogers Producer: Nadia Molinari (BBC North, Radio 4)
Best Scripted Comedy; Presented by Nicholas Parsons	Believe It! by Jon Canter; Producer: Clive Brill (Radio 4)	Alice's Wunderland by Alice Lowe Producer: Sam Bryant (Radio 4); I, Regress by Matt Berry Producer: Sam Bryant (Radio 4)
Best Online Only Audio Drama; Presented by Joseph Millson	Above and Below by Daniel Macnaughton; Producer: Daniel Macnaughton (Aboveandbelowseries.co.uk)	The Minister of Chance by Dan Freeman Producer: Dan Freeman (Radio Static for ministerofchance.com); Varanasi by Silva Semerciyan Producer: Graham Pountney (Screentest Productions for varanasi.theradioplay.com)
Imison Award (2012); Presented by Andrew Davies	Do You Like Banana, Comrades? by Csaba Székely (Radio 4)	The Day We Caught the Train by Nick Payne; The Takeover by Paul Sellar
Tinniswood Award (2012); Presented by Andrew Davies	Kafka the Musical by Murray Gold (Radio 3)	Angarrack by Christopher William Hill (Radio 4); Like Minded People by David Eldridge (Radio 4)

=== 2012 ===
The inaugural ceremony took place on 29 January 2012 and covered audio dramas broadcast between 1 October 2010 and 30 September 2011 or first uploaded / published for free listening online in the UK during the same period.

Inaugural awards – Host: David Tennant
Award	Winner	Other finalists
Best Audio Drama; Presented by Johnny Vegas	Lost Property – The Year My Mother Went Missing by Katie Hims; Producer: Jessica Dromgoole (BBC Radio 4)	A Shoebox of Snow by Julie Mayhew (Producer: Justine Potter (Radio 4); The First Domino by Jonathan Cash Producer: Frank Stirling (Radio 3)
Best Actor; Presented by Tim Davie	David Tennant; Kafka the Musical by Murray Gold (BBC Radio 3)	Damian Lewis Giovanni's Room dramatised by Neil Bartlett (Radio 3); Rory Kinnear Flare Path by Terence Rattigan (Radio 3); Commendation: Tom Riley Henry's Demons by Patrick and Henry Cockburn (Radio 4)
Best Actress; Presented by Don Warrington	Rosie Cavaliero; Lost Property: A Telegram from the Queen by Katie Hims (Radio 4)	Candis Nergaard Atching Tan by Dan Allum (Radio 4); June Whitfield A Montrous Vitality by Andy Merriman (Radio 4)
Best Supporting Actor/Actress; Presented by June Whitfield	Andrew Scott; Referee by Nick Perry (Radio 4)	Carl Prekopp The History of Titus Groan dramatised by Brian Sibley (Radio 4); Rupert Penry-Jones Flare Path by Terence Rattigan (Radio 3)
Best Scripted Comedy Drama; Presented by Richard Wilson	Floating by Hugh Hughes; Producer: James Robinson (Radio 4)	Cabin Pressure by John Finnemore Producer: Dawn Ellis (Radio 4); Ed Reardon's Week by Christopher Douglas Producer: Dawn Ellis (Radio 4)
Best Online Only Audio Drama; Presented by Julie Myerson	Rock by Tim Fountain; Producer: Iain Mackness (The Independent)	Wild Hackney Producer: Francesca Panetta (Hackney Podcast)
Best Adaptation; Presented by Nina Wadia	The History of Titus Groan dramatised by Brian Sibley; Producers: David Hunter, Gemma Jenkins and Jeremy Mortimer (Radio 4)	Alone in Berlin dramatised by Shelagh Stephenson Producer: Eoin O'Callaghan (BBC Northern Ireland, Radio 4); Five Days in May by Matthew Solon Producer: John Dryden (Radio 4)
Best Use of Sound in an Audio Drama; Presented by Bertie Carvel	Bad Memories by Julian Simpson; Producer: Karen Rose (Radio 4)	Can You Hear Me? by Margaret Wilkinson Producer: Nadia Molinari (Radio 4); The History of Titus Groan dramatised by Brian Sibley Producers: David Hunter, Gemma Jenkins and Jeremy Mortimer (Radio 4)
Innovation Award; Presented by Niamh Cusack	The Unfortunates adapted by Graham White; Producer: Mary Peate (Radio 3)	Blue Eyed Boy by Helen Cross Producer: Mary Ward-Lowery (BBC Bristol, Radio 4); Wild Hackney Producer: Francesca Panetta (Hackney Podcast)
Imison Award (2010); Presented by David Edgar	Amazing Grace by Michelle Lipton (Radio 4)	Atching Tan by Dan Allum (Radio 4); The Pursuit by Matt Hartley; The Barber and the Ark by Marcia Layne
Tinniswood Award (2010); Presented by David Edgar	Gerontius by Stephen Wyatt (Radio 4)	The Climb by Andrea Earl (Radio 4); Sarah and Ken by Rebecca Lenkiewicz (Radio 3); Setting a Glass by Nick Warburton (Radio 4)
