= Ed Harris (playwright) =

British playwright

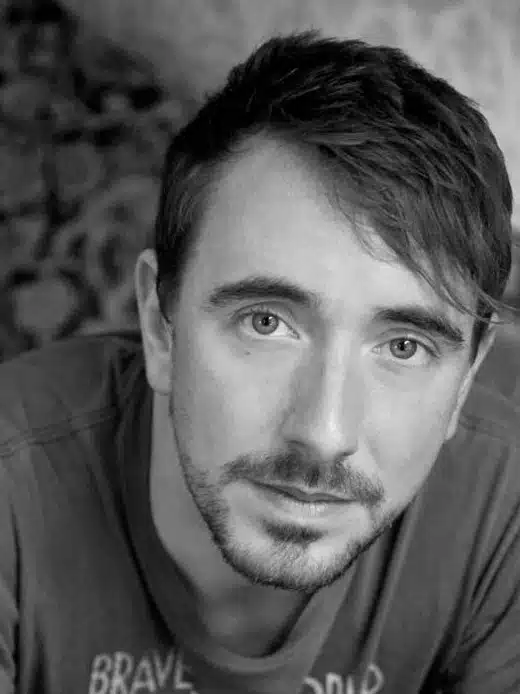
- Born: West London
- Occupation: Playwright
- Writing career
- Notable works: Mongrel Island (2011); The Cow Play (2013); Dot (2015)
- Notable awards: The Prix Europa Award; BBC Audio Drama Award; Writers' Guild Award; Radio Academy Award

Ed Harris is a playwright, radio dramatist, comedy writer, librettist, poet and performer based in Brighton, England.

== Early life ==
Harris grew up in West London and attended Drayton Manor High School and Twyford Church of England High School in Acton. He is dyslexic. After finishing high school, he worked for several years as a bin man and later as a care worker, as well as travelling and working abroad, including waiting tables in Turkey and training huskies in Kiruna, Sweden. He received his first theatrical commission after being ‘discovered’ at a poetry gig he performed at in Brighton in 2002. He is the son of television presenter Fred Harris.

== Career ==
Harris's first play, Sugared Grapefruit, received a full staged reading directed by Andrea Brooks at The Old Vic in 2003, as part of The Old Vic’s New Voices programme.

In 2005, he wrote The Cow Play, which received an Arts Council-funded tour in 2007, and was later revived for the Edinburgh Festival Fringe to great critical acclaim .

His next play, Never Ever After, was shortlisted for the Meyer-Whitworth Award in 2008.

His first major stage play, Mongrel Island, was commissioned by Soho Theatre and opened Steve Marmion's first season as artistic director in July 2011. It was later produced in Mexico City in 2014 as Perro Sin Raza, where it ran for six months, directed by Fernando Rozvar.

His first play for children, What The Thunder Said, won the Writers' Guild Award for Best Children's Play 2017.

Ed has written extensively for BBC Radio drama and comedy. His first radio play, Porshia, was produced in 2007 and starred Robert Webb. Between 2011 and 2015 he won a Sony Gold Radio Academy Award for his series The Resistance Of Mrs Brown, a Writers' Guild Award for Troll and a BBC Audio Drama Award for Billions. Harris also wrote and starred in the semi-autobiographical play, The Slow Kapow

As well as many stand-alone plays, Harris has written numerous series, including an adaption of Franz Kafka's The Castle. in 2015. More recently, he was the lead writer for BBC Radio 4’s Kafkaesque season, commemorating the centenary of Kafka’s death, adapting two further Kafka novels, The Trial and The Man Who Disappeared, and a new biographical piece about Kafka, Franz and Felice, which won the prestigious international Prix Europa Award in 2024. He was also made the Writer in Residence for Kafka’s Transformative Communities’ Project, Wadham College, University of Oxford.

He is the writer of Dot, a sitcom that follows the exploits of some of the female staff of the Cabinet War Rooms during the Second World War, starring Fenella Woolgar, Kate O'Flynn, Freya Parker, Jane Slavin and David Acton.

In 2018, Harris wrote the libretto for a new opera A Shoe Full Of Stars for Opera Schmopera with composer Omar Shahryar. It won a Best Opera For Young Audiences YAMAward / RESEO award in 2018. In 2025 Harris and Shahryar collaborated again on The Little Zombie Girl, a heartwarming horror for teens, for London Youth Opera.

In 2023, Ed Harris wrote Strangers Like Me, a comedy about grief for young adults, commissioned by The National Theatre and produced as part of the National Theatre Connections 23 programme.

Harris is also a published poet. He became a Royal Literary Fellow in 2021.

== Works ==
=== Awards ===
- War With The Newts - currently shortlisted for the BBC Audio Drama Award (2026)
- Franz and Felice - shortlisted for The BBC Audio Drama Award (2025)
- Franz and Felice - Prix Europa Best Fiction Award Winner (2024)
- A Shoe Full Of Stars - YAM Award - RESEO Prize for Best Opera.(2018)
- Unspoken Spoken – One Dance UK Dance On Screen – Impact Award (2018)
- What The Thunder Said - Writers' Guild Award for Best Children's Play (2017)
- Billions - BBC Audio Drama Award (2014)
- The Resistance Of Mrs Brown - Radio Academy Award (2011)
- Troll - Writers' Guild Award (2011)
- The Moment You Feel It – shortlisted for the Tinniswood Award (2009)
- Never Ever After - shortlisted for Meyer-Whitworth Award (2008)
- Nourish - (Directing) – Brighton Fringe Festival Award (2008)

=== Stage ===
- The Little Zombie Girl (2025) - The London Youth Opera
- Strangers Like Me (2023) – National Theatre Connections
- A Dummy’s Guide to Being Lost (2022) – Turtle Key Arts
- A Shoe Full of Stars (2018) – Opera Schmopera / Gestalt Arts
- Chevalier D'eon (2016) - Menagerie Theatre / Hotbed (2016)
- Chicken Shop (2014) - Islington Community Theatre
- The Cow Play (2014) - Smoke & Oakum / Edinburgh Festival
- What The Thunder Said (2014) - Theatre Centre / UK tour (revived in 2016)
- Piglet (2012) - Menagerie Theatre / Hotbed Festival
- Mongrel Island (2011) - Soho Theatre / Mexico (2014)
- Total (2008) - Squaremoon / Brighton Festival Fringe
- Never Ever After (2007) - Chalkfoot / UK tour
- Lucy (2006) - National Youth Theatre / Brighton Fringe Festival
- Sugared Grapefruit (2005) - Zygo Arts / Brighton Fringe Festival

=== Radio ===
- The War With The Newts (2024) - BBC 3 (1 X 1hr 39')
- The Man Who Disappeared (2024) – BBC Radio 4 Classic Serial (2x60’)
- The Trial (2024) – BBC Radio 4 Classic Serial (1x60’)
- Franz and Felice (2024) – Radio 4 Afternoon Drama
- Dot (2015–present) - BBC Radio 4 (1x30’ pilot & 3 4x30’ series)
- Dot and The Russian Dossier (2021) – BBC Radio 4 (45’ Dot special)
- Wasteland (2021) – BBC Radio 4 Afternoon Drama
- Dot (2015–present) - BBC Radio 4 (1x30’ pilot & 3 4x30’ series)
- The Slow Kapow (2017) - BBC Radio 4 Afternoon Drama
- Your Perfect Summer, On Sale Here! (2016) - BBC Radio 4 Afternoon Drama
- The Castle (2015) - BBC Radio 4 Saturday Play (2x60’)
- Pixie Juice (2014) - BBC Radio 4 Afternoon Drama
- The Interplanetary Notes of Ambassador B (2014) - BBC Radio 4 15-Minute Drama (5x15’)
- Take Me To The North Laine (2013) - BBC Radio 4 Afternoon Drama
- Billions (2013) - BBC Radio 4 Afternoon Drama
- The Resistance Of Mrs Brown (2012) - BBC Radio 4 15-Minute Drama (5x15’)
- The Wall (2011) - BBC Radio 3 The Wire
- Troll (2010) - BBC Radio 4 Afternoon Drama
- The Moment You Feel It (2009) - BBC Radio 4 Afternoon Drama
- Aromatherapy (2009) - BBC Radio 4 Afternoon Drama
- Porshia (2007) - BBC Radio 4 Friday Play
- Bespoken Word (2006) - BBC Radio 4
- Absolute Silence (2005) – BBC 7
