= Drama Queen =

Drama Queen(s) may refer to:

== Music ==
=== Albums ===
- Drama Queen (Ivy Queen album), 2010
- Drama Queen (Neurosonic album), 2006
- Drama Queen, by Autozamm, 2008
- Drama Queen, by Idina Menzel, 2023
- Drama Queen, by Veena Malik, or the title song, 2012

=== Songs ===
- "Drama Queen" (DQ song), 2007
- "Drama Queen" (Vanessa Petruo song), 2004
- "Drama Queen (That Girl)", by Lindsay Lohan from the soundtrack of the 2004 film Confessions of a Teenage Drama Queen
- "Drama Queen", by Alessia Cara from In the Meantime, 2021
- "Drama Queen", by Family Force 5 from Family Force 5, 2005
- "Drama Queen", by Green Day from ¡Tré!, 2012
- "Drama Queen", by Meghan Trainor from Takin' It Back, 2022
- "Drama Queen", by Switches from Heart Tuned to D.E.A.D., 2007
- "Drama Queen", by Vishal–Shekhar, Shreya Ghoshal and Vishal Dadlani from the film Hasee Toh Phasee, 2013

== Print media ==
- DramaQueen, a manga/manhwa publisher
- Drama Queen (manga), a 2024 manga by Kuraku Ichikawa
- Drama Queen, a 2013 memoir by Suchitra Krishnamoorthi
- Drama Queen: One Autistic Woman and a Life of Unhelpful Labels, a 2021 memoir by Sara Gibbs

== Television ==
- Drama Queens (TV series), a British reality programme
- Drama Queens (podcast), a 2021 One Tree Hill rewatch podcast
- "Drama Queens" (Drag Race Holland), a 2020 episode
- "Drama Queens" (RuPaul's Drag Race), a 2013 episode
- "Drama Queens" (Sex and the City), a 2000 episode

== Other media ==
- Drama Queen, a 2006 short film featuring Joris Jarsky
- Drama Queens, a Nintendo DS game published by Majesco

== See also ==
- Histrionic personality disorder
- Make a mountain out of a molehill
- Queens of Drama (disambiguation)
