= Home Front (BBC radio series) =

British radio drama series

- Genre: Drama
- Running time: 12 minutes (omnibus episodes: 57-59 mins)
- Country of origin: United Kingdom
- Language: English
- Home station: BBC Radio 4
- Syndicates: BBC Radio 4 Extra
- Written by: Sebastian Baczkiewicz; Sarah Daniels; Georgia Fitch; Katie Hims; Caroline Horton; Shaun McKenna; Richard Monks; Melissa Murray; Mike Walker; Claudine Toutongi
- Directed by: Lucy Collingwood; Jessica Dromgoole; Allegra McIlroy
- Produced by: Lucy Collingwood; Allegra McIlroy
- Edited by: Jessica Dromgoole
- Recording studio: Studio 9D, The Mailbox, BBC Birmingham
- Original release: 4 August 2014 – 11 November 2018
- No. of series: 15
- No. of episodes: 561 (560 regular and one 45 minute episode); 112 omnibus episodes
- Audio format: Stereo
- Website: Programme website
- Podcast: Home Front omnibus podcasts

Home Front is a British radio drama, broadcast on BBC Radio 4 between 4 August 2014 and 11 November 2018. Based on historical events exactly one hundred years before the date of broadcast, Home Front tells the story of World War I from the perspective of those managing life in wartime Britain. It is part of the BBC's World War I centenary season, with its final episode broadcast on the 100th anniversary of the Armistice. In total, there are 561 episodes.

== Production ==
Each twelve-minute episode tells a fictional story set against a background of historical truth with at least one historical ‘fact of the day’ built into each episode. Each episode follows one character’s day. Together, they build into a mosaic of experience from a wide cross-section of British society. For series one and two, Ciaran Bermingham and Sarah Morrison were production co-ordinators, the assistant producer was Leo McGann and the studio manager Martha Littlehailes. The theme music was composed by Matthew Strachan and performed by the BBC Concert Orchestra.

Episodes were broadcast Monday to Friday at 12:04 on BBC Radio 4, with an omnibus edition (combining all of that week's episodes) on Fridays at 21:02. Episodes from the start of series 5 (both individual and omnibus) are available for download as MP3s and will remain so indefinitely. There were fifteen series in total, each season with a subtitle and a particular theme. Series average eight weeks duration, with an eight-week break in-between.

== Overview ==
=== Series 1: The Lost Boys ===
Series one of Home Front was first broadcast between 4 August and 3 October 2014. It is set in Folkestone, a fashionable Edwardian seaside resort that quickly became one of the hubs of the military machine and close enough to France to hear the fighting. The lead writer for series one was Katie Hims.

=== Series 2: What Will You Do? ===
Series two was broadcast from 1 December 2014 to 9 January 2015. It is, once again, set in Folkestone and focuses on volunteering. The lead writer for series two was Katie Hims.

=== Series 3: A New Deal ===
In series three the action moves to Tynemouth and the focus shifted to war industry in the factories and shipyards of North East England. The season was broadcast from 2 February to 27 March 2015. The lead writer for series three was Shaun McKenna.

=== Series 4: Where There's A Need ===
In series four the story returns to Folkestone with a focus on profit and profiteering. The series was broadcast from 25 May to 17 July 2015. The lead writer for series four was Sebastian Baczkiewicz.

=== Series 5: Whisky On The Other Side ===
In series five the action remains in Folkestone and focuses on the church and a growing widespread belief in spiritualism. The series was broadcast from 7 September to 30 October 2015. The lead writer for series five was Sarah Daniels.

=== Series 6: Angels In All But Name ===
In series six the action moves to nearby Sandgate in Kent and the Bevan Hospital and focuses on nursing and casualties, both physical and emotional. The series was broadcast from 21 December 2015 to 12 February 2016. The lead writer for series six was Shaun McKenna.

=== Series 7: Moral, Medical, Family & Economic ===
In series seven the action moves to Devon and focuses on the impact of conscription on a farming community. The series was broadcast from 4 April to 27 May 2016. The lead writer for series seven was Richard Monks.

In an episode broadcast on 29 April 2016 and referencing the Irish Easter 1916 rising, an Irish character talked about the terrible destruction of O'Connell Street in Dublin. Though Sackville Street was only officially renamed O'Connell Street in 1924, it had been called O'Connell Street by nationalists since the 19th century.

=== Series 8: Espionage & Propaganda ===
Series eight was set in Folkestone once more and was broadcast from 8 August to 30 September 2016. The lead writer for series eight was Katie Hims.

=== Series 9: Foreign Bodies ===
The story returned to Tyneside and focused on xenophobia and suspicion. The series broadcast from 12 December 2016 to 3 February 2017. The lead writer for series nine was Sebastian Bacziewicz.

=== Series 10: Our Daily Bread ===
Back in Folkestone once more, the story focuses on the Church and Class. The lead writer for series 10 was Sarah Daniels and the series broadcast from 17 April 2017 to 9 June 2017. On 25 May 2017, a special 45-minute edition of Home Front was broadcast in addition to the regular episode. This broadcast marked the centenary of Britain's first Gotha Air Raid, which devastated Folkestone on this day in 1917.

=== Series 11: Broken and Mad ===
Series eleven is set in Folkestone and focuses on illness and recovery. The lead writer for the series is Katie Hims. It began broadcast on 31 July 2017 and ended on 22 September 2017.

=== Series 12: Giddy With Possibility ===
Running from 13 November 2017 until 5 January 2018, Series 12 returns to Tyneside. Its focus is on fears around Bolshevism and strike action by the munitionettes, female factory workers.

=== Series 13: A Woman's Place ===
Starting on 5 March, and concluding on 27 April 2018, Series 13 is set in Folkestone. Its themes are relationships - within families, lovers, parents and children - and the strains and changes placed on them by the war. Prostitution, and the difficulties facing unmarried mothers, are also explored.

=== Series 14: Needs Must When The Devil Drives ===
Series 14, only the second to take place in Devon, began on 18 June 2018. It opens with the launch of the WI (the Women's Institute), conscientious objectors, and pressure to farm all available land ahead to pre-empt the loss of European supply chains.

== Selected awards ==
Year	Award	Category	Notes	Result	Ref.
2016	BBC Audio Drama Awards	Best Supporting Actor or Actress	Nominee: Billy Kennedy	Finalist	
2018	BBC Audio Drama Awards	Best Audio Drama (series or serial)		Finalist	
2019	BBC Audio Drama Awards	Outstanding Contribution		Won	
2020	BBC Audio Drama Awards	Tinniswood Award	"A Fragile Peace"	Commendation	

== Reception ==
The first series received generally favourable press coverage. The Home Front has also been described as a 'well-crafted and addictive radio drama.'
