= Theatre Renegade =

Theatre Renegade is a theatre company based in the United Kingdom which produces socio-political theatre and has a strong focus on putting story, engagement and empathy at the heart of the theatrical experience.

== Overview ==
The company was founded in late 2012 by current Artistic Director Ryan Forde Iosco. Focusing on new writing, collaboration and innovation Theatre Renegade produces full productions, theatrical response nights to political/world events and created Courting Drama.

== Courting Drama ==
Originally produced in 2013 at the Bush Theatre, Courting Drama showcases five new collaborative partners and the five pieces that they create and mould together over a two-week period. Previous writers include: Anna Jordan, Judy Upton, Phoebe Eclair-Powell, Joseph Wilde, Hassan Abdulrazzak, Vinay Patel and James Fritz and have been nominated/won Laurence Olivier Award, Bruntwood Prize for Playwriting, Verity Bargate Award, George Devine Award, BAFTA and Emmy Award.

Moving to The Little at Southwark Playhouse in 2014 and then subsequently The Large in 2015, Courting Drama is one of the pre-eminent nights of short plays in London.

== Selected work ==
- In Response To... Politics by various writers (The Other Palace, 2017)
- In Response To... The Orlando Attack by various writers (The Other Palace, 2016)
- Scarlet by Sam H Freeman (Southwark Playhouse, 2015)
- Courting Drama by various writers (Southwark Playhouse, 2014/15/16)
- Courting Drama by various writers (Bush Theatre, 2013)
- Kingdom Come by Nia Da Costa (Leicester Square Theatre, 2012)
- How the Heart Works by Shapour Benard (Leicester Square Theatre, 2012)

== Award nominations ==
- Nomination - 2016 Offie for Best Ensemble - Scarlet (Heida Reed, Jade Ogugua, Lucy Kilpatrick and Asha Reid)
- Nomination - 2016 Offie for Best Production - Scarlet
