= Sebastian Baczkiewicz =

English writer

Sebastian Baczkiewicz (born 1962, Hammersmith, London) is an English writer.

== Biography ==
As a teenager, Baczkiewicz was a member of Questors Theatre in West London before training as an actor at The Drama Centre. He was the BBC's first writer in residence in 2000.

== Work ==
Author of a number of episodes of Holby City, Baczkiewicz has written a range of plays for BBC Radio including adaptations of Les Miserables and The Count of Monte Cristo and ten series of Pilgrim, starring Paul Hilton as William Palmer, the immortal title character.

His stage plays include The Lives of the Saints, Hello Paris, The Man Who Shot the Tiger and Dancing under the Bridge.

In 2004, he wrote half of a six-part series, Arthur, for BBC Radio 4 using characters from Arthurian legend.

In 2012, his radio drama Pilgrim was nominated for the Prix Italia and awarded silver at the Prix Europa.

Baczkiewicz was lead writer on Radio 4's Home Front, a radio drama series broadcast across the centenary of the First World War, in 14 series, from 2014 to 2018, and in which William Palmer makes a brief one-word appearance.

Ghosts of Heathrow, with Paul McGann was broadcast in 2014. Recorded on location, An Angel in Miami and Elsinor were broadcast on Radio 4 in 2019.

In 2023 he co-wrote (with Paul Cornell) an adaptation of Tom Clancy’s Splinter Cell: Firewall (2022), originally broadcast on BBC Radio 4, adapted from James Swallow's novel of the same name, itself based on the video game. Winner of the 2023 Scribe Award for Best Audio Drama.
