= Richard Imison Award =

Radio drama award

The Richard Imison Award is an award which recognises the best radio drama, generally by a writer new to the industry, and is now awarded as part of the BBC Audio Drama Awards. It was established in 1994 and commemorates the life and work of Richard Imison.

Richard Imison was Script Editor for BBC Radio Drama from 1963 to 1991. In the thirty years that Imison worked for BBC Radio Drama it was the largest patron of original creative dramatic writing in Britain. In his role as Script Editor no other single individual therefore had as much influence in either the discovery of new talent or the encouragement of established writers such as Edward Albee, Ludmilla Petrushevskaya, Alexander Gelman, Harold Pinter and Samuel Beckett in the production of Drama for this genre.

After his death in 1993 the Society of Authors established the Imison Award in recognition of Imison's enduring influence on the development of high quality dramatic writing.

Submissions for the award must consist of a completed nomination form as well as three copies of the writer's original script and recording of the broadcast. Further copies may be requested if the work is short-listed. Further details can be found on the Society of Authors website.

== List of prize winners ==
The prize winners

- 2025: Tether by Isley Lynn and Edson Burton
- 2024: Benny & Hitch by Andrew McCaldon
- 2023: The Making of a Monster by Connor Allen
- 2022: The Lemonade Lads by Faebian Averies
- 2021: Maynard by Fraser Ayres
- 2020: Bathwater by Vicky Foster
- 2019: Of A Lifetime, Lulu Raczka
- 2018: The Book of Yehudit, Adam Usden
- 2017: Comment Is Free, James Fritz
- 2016: 30 Eggs, Eoin O'Connor
- 2015: How to Say Goodbye Properly, E.V. Crowe
- 2014: The Loving Ballad of Captain Bateman, Joseph Wilde with composer Tim Van Eyken
- 2013: Do You Like Banana, Comrades?, Csaba Székely
- 2012: Amazing Grace, Michelle Lipton
- 2010: The Road Wife, Eoin McNamee
- 2009: Girl from Mars, Lucy Caldwell
- 2008: The Magician's Daughter, Adam Beeson
- 2007: Not Talking, Mike Bartlett
- 2006: Mixed Blood, Nazrin Choudhury
- 2005: Mr. Sex, Steve Coombs
- 2004: All You on the Good Earth, Stephen Sharkey
- 2003: Milk; Celia Bryce for The Skategrinder, N.Leyshon and S. McAnena
- 2002: The Waltzer, Rhiannon Tise
- 2001: Electricity, Murray Gold
- 2000: A Matter of Interpretation, Peter Morgan
- 1999: Skin Deep, Ben Cooper
- 1998: Earthquake Girl, Katie Hims
- 1997: Holy Secrets & Wilde Belles, John Waters joint winner Rosemary Kay Holy Secrets & Wilde Belles
- 1996: I Luv You Jimmy Spud, Lee Hall
- 1995: Daisy the Cow who Talked & Kissing the Gargoyle, Gerry Stembridge joint winner James Stock
- 1994: The Long Hot Summer of '76, Gabriel Gbadamosi
