= Tomorrow, Today! =

Radio sitcom

- Genre: Comedy
- Running time: 30 minutes
- Country of origin: United Kingdom
- Language: English
- Home station: BBC Radio 4
- Starring: Peter Bowles; Cheryl Campbell; John Fortune; Jon Glover; Joseph Kloska
- Written by: Christopher William Hill
- Original release: 2006 – 2008
- No. of series: 2
- No. of episodes: 10 (4, 6)
- Audio format: Stereophonic sound
- Website: https://www.bbc.co.uk/radio4/tomorrowtoday/

Tomorrow, Today! is a radio sitcom written by Christopher William Hill, broadcast on BBC Radio 4 between 2006 and 2008. It was itself a spoof of radio science fiction dramas of the late 1950s and early 1960s. The writer was Christopher William Hill.

The sitcom takes place in a BBC studio in 1961, where a group of "bright young things" and aging actors produce a futuristic drama set in the year 2006, containing space flight, ray guns, and contact with aliens.

The lead roles are played by Nigel Lavery (Peter Bowles) and Sylvia Hann (Cheryl Campbell) who hate their jobs only slightly more than they hate each other. Their off-mike conversations are laced with carping comments and innuendo about each other's long-lost youth and popularity. Sylvia was once the voice of "Listen with Mother". The "comic relief" for the radio production is provided by a stereotypical Welshman, "Taffy" Jones, played by a non-Welsh actor, Douglas Bennings (Jon Glover).

Both series are regularly rebroadcast on Radio 4 Extra.

== Plot ==
The show is about to be terminated, much to the relief of the contractually committed leads. However, the BBC decides that thanks to the Soviet Union's apparent lead in space travel, national morale requires it to continue with a new pro-British, anti-Soviet slant. Writer and producer Hugo Kellerman (Joseph Kloska) introduces new aliens with a Communist philosophy and has them do battle with his heroes. BBC executive Godfrey Winnard (John Fortune) watches over the new production and keeps adding new elements to the mix, such as a member of the Royal Shakespeare Company (Leslie Phillips) brought in to play an android.

In the second series, set in 1962, Hugo is commissioned to devise a science fiction series for children's television and, thanks to a series of mishaps on the way to the Television Centre, has the idea for "Professor Fabula and the Diloks," featuring a scientist who travels through time and space in a police call box, accompanied by a robotic dog. However, the idea is squelched due to salacious interpretations of the Professor's status as a single man wandering in time and space with a dog.

In the final episode of the second series, the entire production relocates to Wales as the Cuban Missile Crisis threatens to cause a holocaust. There, they discover that Jones, killed off and replaced by an equally stereotypical Scot (also voiced by Douglas), was immensely popular among the locals. Faced with mobs of angry Welsh fans calling him "Taffy killer," Hugo writes in a resurrection for the character, but Douglas's "more authentic" reading of the part causes the disgusted locals to cut power to the studio, which the team interprets as the arrival of Armageddon.
