= Pilgrim (Baczkiewicz) =

2008 fantasy radio series

- Genre: Radio drama
- Country of origin: United Kingdom
- Language: English
- Home station: BBC Radio 4
- Starring: Paul Hilton
- Created by: Sebastian Baczkiewicz
- Original release: 26 November 2008 – 31 October 2024
- No. of series: 10
- No. of episodes: 35

Pilgrim is a fantasy radio series by Sebastian Baczkiewicz and produced by BBC Radio and starring Paul Hilton as William Palmer, known as Pilgrim. It is a tale of a hero cursed with immortality and forced to wander for eternity between the worlds of magic and mortals.

The first series was first broadcast on Radio 4 in 2008.

== Premise ==
In 1185, while making a pilgrimage to Canterbury, William Palmer happens to mention in conversation that he hopes the Church in England will soon eradicate the foolish belief in the Otherworld. Unfortunately for William, his fellow pilgrim angrily reveals himself to be the king of the Greyfolk and places a curse on him that condemns him to roam endlessly between the two worlds. Known as Pilgrim, his mission is to maintain the uneasy balance between the worlds and to protect the human race from the enemy whose existence it stubbornly refuses to acknowledge. He undertakes a series of quests in the hope that the curse will be lifted, and finds himself, centuries later, in modern times.

== Cast ==
- Paul Hilton as William Palmer/Pilgrim

=== Recurring ===
- Jamie Foreman as Puck (Series 1-2)
- Adrian Lukis as Haddonfield (Series 1)
- Susan Engel (Series 1) and Judy Parfitt as Doris (Series 2)
- Janice Acquah as Mirabella (Series 1, 6)
- Malcolm Tierney (Series 1) and Dudley Sutton (Series 3) as Macadam
- Gunnar Cauthery as Trent (Series 1
- Donnla Hughes as Wilson (Series 1)
- Sean Baker as Mr Hazelbury (Series 2) and Zach (Series 7)
- Agnes Bateman as Legend (Series 2, 4) and the Girl (Series 8)
- Adeel Akhtar as Becker (Series 2, Series 7
- Adam Billington as Henselow (Series 3
- Kate Fleetwood as Birdie (Series 3-4)
- Justin Salinger as Morgan Hambleton (Series 6-7)
- Matthew Tennyson as Hartley (Series 6)
- Shaun Mason as Liam (Series 6)
- Adie Allen as Laura (Series 7)
- David Schofield as Delancey (Series 7
- Joseph Kloska as Mr Hibbens (Series 7)
- Scarlett Brookes as India (Series 7)
- Ewan Bailey as Boris (Series 7)
- Carolyn Pickles as Moira (Series 7) and Roxanna (Series 8)
- Nick Underwood as Frank (Series 7)
- Nicola Ferguson as Leila (Series 7)
- Fenella Woolgar as Mrs Bronson (Series 8)
- Tony Turner as Sam Notice (Series 8)
- Cameron Percival as Matt (Series 8)
- Tayla Kovacevic Ebong as Donny (Series 8)
- Don Gilet as Jack Sweet (Series 8)
- Jeanette Percival as Klara (Series 8)
- Lewis Bray as Lloyd (Series 8)
- Stefan Adegbola as John Wayne (Series 9)
- Louis Jay Jordan as Rabbit Owens (Series 9)
- Charlotte East as Amy Lister (Series 9)
- Katie Redford as Piper Lawrence (Series 9)
- Luke Nunn as Vaughan Richards (Series 9)
- Roger Ringrose as Eddie/Mr Buttoner (Series 9)
- Jane Whittenshaw as Sally Mop (Series 9)
- Ellie Piercy as Janice Wayne (Series 9)
- Emma Handy as Ginger Richards (Series 9)
- Toby Jones as Vass (Series 10)
- Holli Dempsey as Kara (Series 10)
- Sirine Saba as Clemira (Series 10)
- Shreya Lallu as Rana (Series 10)
- David Hounslow as Keith (Series 10)
- Carl Prekopp as Mr Summerskill (Series 10)
- Nuhazet Diaz Cano as Benji (Series 10)
- Agnes Dromgoole as The Girl (Series 10)

== Episodes ==
=== Series 1 ===
First broadcast 26 November-17 December 2008.

- Episode 1: "He Who Would Valiant Be" – A stolen dragon's egg must be retrieved by a hero cursed with immortality.
- Episode 2: "Then Fancies Flee Away" – Humankind's hero is forced to help a young lad who has lain in a coma for seven years.
- Episode 3: "No Foes Shall Stay His Might" – A hunter is after Pilgrim, who tries to save himself by rescuing a young girl.
- Episode 4: "'Gainst All Disaster" – Humankind's immortal hero must help Joseph of Arimathea, held captive by a malevolent angel.

=== Series 2 ===
First broadcast 31 August-21 September 2010.

- Episode 1: "The Drowned Church" – Humanity's ageless champion returns to stop a sinister church congregation under the sea.
- Episode 2: "The Lost Hotel" – The mystical, timeless man finds himself an unwilling guest at a sinister hotel.
- Episode 3: "The Lady in the Lake" – The ageless wanderer is drawn to a magical fiddle player and finds a tragic love triangle.
- Episode 4: "Hope Springs" – The roaming immortal reunites with his daughter, Doris but learns that an old foe is on his trail.

=== Series 3 ===
First broadcast 26 January-16 February 2012.

- Episode 1: "Crowsfall Wood" – An old friend of Pilgrim's is possessed by a deadly forest spirit.
- Episode 2: "Sookey Hill" – Pilgrim investigates a story about a man being turned into a hare.
- Episode 3: "Aisley Bridge" – Pilgrim is drawn into the world of the Lanes, and the immortal children who live there.
- Episode 4: "Lindie Island" – Pilgrim is asked to sacrifice a man he has kept safe for centuries.

=== Series 4 ===
First broadcast 21 February-14 March 2013.

- Episode 1: "Mullerby Fair" – The immortal wanderer William Palmer has to fight the malevolent Mr Speed.
- Episode 2: "Tregarrah Head" – Pilgrim has to rescue the Old Man of Tregarrah Head from his fate.
- Episode 3: "Wedlowe Sound" – Pilgrim must tackle an old adversary and save the community of Wedlowe Sound.
- Episode 4: "Bleaker Lake" – Pilgrim hopes to find an end to the war of attrition with Birdie.

=== Series 5 ===
First broadcast 21 November-12 December 2013.

- Episode 1: "Lyall Park" – The immortal wanderer William Palmer comes to Lyall Park.
- Episode 2: "Gallowstone Hill" – Pilgrim comes to a village cursed with a dangerous collective madness.
- Episode 3: "Woolmere Walter" – Pilgrim is forced to assist an odd couple in their very unusual courtship.
- Episode 4: "Parsons Mount" – Pilgrim's quest for Radiant Boy forces him to the one place he has been forbidden to go.

=== Series 6 ===
First broadcast 22 December 2014-12 January 2015.

- Episode 1: "Jackson's Mill" – Pilgrim discovers that an old friend is being haunted by a malevolent spirit.
- Episode 2: "St Lewin" – In search of silver and gold, Pilgrim comes to St Lewin.
- Episode 3: "Ouldmeadow Jack" – Pilgrim is still in search of gold to rescue those trapped in Hartley's mine.
- Episode 4: "Daventree Mansions" – Pilgrim returns to Jacksons Mill where Morgan and Hartley have prepared a nasty surprise.

=== Series 7 ===
First broadcast 29 February-4 March 2016.

- Episode 1: "Clennan Court" – Pilgrim is on the trail of murderous magician Morgan Hambleton.
- Episode 2: "Stickton General" – Mushrooms and a dead body help Pilgrim track down his former close friend Morgan Hambleton.
- Episode 3: "Shoulder Hill" – Pilgrim meets some old friends when he takes Morgan Hambleton to a stone circle.
- Episode 4: "Caudley Fair" – Pilgrim learns that Mr Delancey's daughter, India, has been abducted.
- Episode 5: "Bayldon Abbey" – Mr Delancey must release Pilgrim and his daughter from the enchantment of Caudley Fair.

=== Series 8 ("The Winter Queen") ===
First broadcast 10-11 December 2018.

- Episode 1: "Revenge Served Cold" – Every year, on the winter solstice, the small town of Melcombe observes a custom the roots and meaning of which are lost in the mists of time. A torchlit procession to the ancient tomb of Cairndale Knapp, overlooking the town, puts the old sun to bed and greets the new sun in the morning, restoring balance to the year.
- Episode 2: "Blizzard" – This year, however, Mr Sam Notice has bought the Knapp and has set about landscaping it. And with the felling of an ancient yew tree, the roots and meaning of the old custom spring malevolently to life, as the Winter Queen is finally released from her prison and bent on revenge.

=== Series 9 ("The Timbermoor Imp") ===
First broadcast on BBC Radio 4 in October 2020 and billed as "a Hallowe'en adventure for the immortal mediator".

- Episode 1 – Pilgrim donates an impossibly valuable artwork to Timbermoor Museum in order to keep it open and maintaining a particular shabby exhibit.
- Episode 2 – Sally Mop's out and doing the bidding of a vindictive teenager, whether he likes it or not.

=== Series 10 ("Belle Meadow Fayre") ===
First broadcast 30-31 October 2024.

- Episode 1 - Each year at Belle Meadow Fayre, the Greyfolk meet to celebrate the burial of John Barleycorn, a ritual to mark autumn's end. But this year there’s a problem: Old Johnny John John has gone missing. Autumn shows no sign of abating and without the sacred ceremony at Belle Meadow, winter will not come. The Greyfolk are angry. It's down to Pilgrim to find Old Johnny John John and face down his kidnapper, the rogue faerie Kara.
- Episode 2 - The rogue faerie Kara has caused havoc in the village of Woodwarthing by taking Old Johnny John John hostage, whose annual sacrifice is required for the seasons to change. It's down to Pilgrim to find him and face down his kidnapper.
