= Ken Cheng =

British comedian and former poker player

- Born: Kenneth Yuan-Ke Cheng; Cambridge, United Kingdom
- Relatives: Hsiung Shih-I (great-grandfather)

Kenneth Yuan-Ke Cheng is a British-Chinese former professional poker player and comedian. Cheng has won the 2017 Funniest Joke of the Fringe, and a 2023 BBC Audio Drama Award for Best Comedy. He additionally became popular on LinkedIn in 2024 for his satirical posts in which he poses as a CEO. In 2025, he won the ITV game show Genius Game.

== Early life and education ==
Cheng was born in Cambridge to mother Xin, a freelance Mandarin interpreter for the British police, and father Jen, who designed bank security software and whose parents were from Hong Kong, immigrating to the United Kingdom from Beijing in the 1980s. Cheng's father returned to China when Cheng was 11. His great-grandfather on his mother's side was academic and playwright Hsiung Shih-I. At school, he came to be known as "the human calculator". He studied mathematics at Cambridge University, directing The Footlights International Tour Show 2015: Love Handles, which toured the UK, Paris and North America. He later dropped out of university after a year, to become a professional poker player.

== Comedy career ==
Cheng was a finalist at the 2015 BBC New Comedy Awards, which he said was a "game changer" in his career. Reviewing for Chortle, Steve Bennett stated that Cheng had "deserved to win" the award.

In 2017, Cheng performed at the Edinburgh Festival Fringe for the first time, and won Funniest Joke of the Fringe for the joke "I'm not a fan of the new pound coin, but then again, I hate all change." The joke obtained 33% of 2,000 votes. He was also listed on the Fringe's New Talent Hotlist. That September, he authored a viral Twitter thread which insulted the national flag of every country in the world, later stating that "people are getting worked up at the idea of disrespecting a flag, but I thought it would be fun to do all of them, in the true spirit of equality."

Cheng stopped playing poker professionally in 2018, stating that he had both won and lost more than $100,000 in one day. His stand-up series Chinese Comedian, which explored British Chinese culture, was broadcast on BBC Radio 4 in 2018. For this, he won a BBC Audio Drama Award for Best Comedy in 2023. He toured his show Best Dad Ever in 2019, named after the side of a Toblerone bar, and including discussion of the 100 toy lambs Cheng had as a child; The Guardian described him as a "calculating and capable young comic", giving the show three stars out of five. In 2022, he featured in Season 3 of 'Dave TV' comedy series 'Comedians Giving Lectures'. In 2023, another of Cheng's stand-up specials, I Can School You, in which he speaks about the education system, was broadcast on BBC Radio 4.

In 2024, Cheng became popular on LinkedIn for crafting a satirical CEO personality and posting parodic versions of LinkedIn posts. Satirical claims made on this account included the idea that taking away employees' desk chairs would make them more alert and inspired, that it was okay for men to cry if it was about the end of tax loopholes, and that watching pornography at work would be justifiable in certain contexts. This gained him thousands of followers on the platform, with his posts being shared to other platforms such as Reddit and Twitter. Commenting on this, Cheng has said he has "always been against corporate structure", and has been able to get comedy gigs through the posts.

Cheng is set to tour his show, The Big Brain Show for People with 3,000 IQ, in 2025.

== Filmography ==
=== Television ===
| Year | Series | Role | Notes | Ref. |
|---|---|---|---|---|
| 2021 | This Time with Alan Partridge | Tommy | 1 episode | |
| 2022 | Comedians Giving Lectures | Himself | Participant | |
| 2025 | Genius Game | Himself | Winner | |
