= Ryan Forde Iosco =

American actor

- Born: Chicago, Illinois, U.S.
- Occupations: Video Game voice artist, actor and theatremaker

Ryan Forde Iosco is an American artist, actor, and theatremaker.

== Biography ==
Iosco was born in Chicago, Illinois and trained as an actor at Tring Park School for the Performing Arts and the Royal Central School of Speech and Drama.

== Voice work ==
=== Video games ===
- Anthem (2019) - Various characters
- Pillars of Eternity II: Deadfire (2018) Player Voice and Various
- Lego Marvel Super Heroes 2 (2017) - Triton
- Mass Effect: Andromeda (2017) - Various Characters
- Dragon Age: Inquisition (2015) - Various Voices
- Magrunner: Dark Pulse (2013) - Kram Gruckezber

=== Radio plays ===
- Doctor Who: The Vanity Trap (2020) - Dr Karp
- Around the World in 80 Days (2019) - Commander
- The War Master: The Coney Island Chameleon (2019) - Fletcher
- Missy: The Broken Clock (2019) - The Actor Playing Joe Lynwood
- A Thousand Words (2015) - Mikey
- Doctor Who: Shield of the Jötunn (2015) - Bryce/Talessh

=== Commercials ===
Ryan's voice has featured in commercials for brands including Coca-Cola, Absolut, Samsung, Trebor, Axe, Universal Studios, and Christies.

== Theatre Renegade ==
Founded in 2012, Theatre Renegade is a theatre company based in the United Kingdom which produces socio-political theatre and has a strong focus on putting story, engagement and empathy at the heart of the theatrical experience.

Iosco continues as the artistic director since its inception and created the infamous new writing night Courting Drama and political response night In Response To.
