= Queens of Drama =

Queens of Drama may refer to:

- Queens of Drama (film), a French musical drama film from 2024
- Queens of Drama (TV series), an American television series from 2015

== See also ==
- Drama Queen (disambiguation)
