= Story of a Rabbit =

Stage Production by Hugh Hughes

Story of a Rabbit is a mixed-media stage production created and performed by Shôn Dale-Jones, in collaboration with British touring theatre company Hoipolloi, and is one of several stage shows written and performed by Dale-Jones as his fictional alter-ego Hugh Hughes. The production spent part of its run at the Barbican Theatre in London.

== Themes ==
In the production, Hughes discusses his father's death and the impact it had upon him, explored by the simultaneous telling of a second story featuring the death of a rabbit he was once looking after for a friend. As he weaves the two stories together, he explores the mysteries surrounding mortality and how different perspectives affect storytelling.

Hughes additionally addresses themes of human connection, examining the audience as a whole and as individuals. During performances, Hughes interacted with the audience before the show, and even went on to directly address them during the performance. Alongside this audience participation, live music by Aled Williams, various props, and slideshow images were utilized by Hughes.

== Related ==
Story of a Rabbit is the second show created by Hughes, the first being Floating. Story of a Rabbit was nominated for a Total Theatre Award and won a Scotsman Fringe First Award at the 2007 Edinburgh Festival Fringe.
