= Floating (play) =

Stage production created by Hugh Hughes

Floating is a 2005 stage production created and performed by "emerging Welsh performance artist" Hugh Hughes (aka Shôn Dale-Jones) in collaboration with British touring theatre company Hoipolloi. It tells the story of the Isle of Anglesey floating away from the mainland of Wales and voyaging around the world. Hughes performs alongside actor Sioned Rowlands. Hughes introduces the story to the audience and re-enacts the story, playing himself, with Rowlands playing all the other parts.

Floating won a Total Theatre Award at the 2006 Edinburgh Festival Fringe. Following its run in Edinburgh, the show continued to tour to venues and festivals across the World including Sydney Opera House, Barbican Centre, Barrow Street Theatre in New York City and PuSh International Performing Arts Festival in Vancouver.

Since Floating, Hugh Hughes has created two new stage shows, Story of a Rabbit and 360.

In September 2011, BBC Radio 4 broadcast a new version of Floating as an Afternoon Play.
