= Mair Bosworth =

British radio producer

Mair Bosworth FRSL is a British radio producer. After leaving the nonprofit industry, she began a career in radio production, where she won a student award for her work while studying at Bournemouth University. She works at BBC Bristol's Arts Unit as a producer for the BBC Radio 4 nightly programme Book at Bedtime.

== Biography ==
Bosworth was educated at the University of Warwick and Bournemouth University, where she studied as a Radio Production student. She had originally worked for nonprofits prior to her radio career, at one point working at ActionAid as Research and Information Manager.

Bosworth later decided to switch careers from nonprofits to the radio industry after "years of scribbling down programme ideas on buses". While studying at Bournemouth, her university production on swimmers at the Hampstead Heath Ponds, "Winterswimming", won 2011 Gold Charles Parker Prize.

Bosworth later started working for BBC Bristol, where she began working at their Arts Unit as an assistant producer. She has worked at BBC Radio 4 nightly programme Book at Bedtime, where her work includes reading novels being considered for adaptation to the radio format and commissioning short stories original to the programme. In addition to her work at Book at Bedtime, she also collaborates with other writers and poets on other audio content, including radio dramas, radio broadcasts of poetry, and podcasts.

Bosworth was nominated for Best Arts Producer at the 2018 Audio Production Awards. She was appointed Honorary Fellow of the Royal Society of Literature in 2020.
