= Tinniswood Award =

British radio award

The Tinniswood Award is a British annual award for original radio drama. It is named in memory of Peter Tinniswood, who died in 2003, and was established by the Society of Authors and the Writers' Guild of Great Britain; it is sponsored by the Authors' Licensing and Collecting Society. The prize is for original radio drama broadcast within the United Kingdom, and is open to stand-alone plays or first episodes of series or serials; entries are submitted by their producer. It is worth £3,000.

With the establishment of the BBC Audio Drama Awards, the Tinniswood Award has been incorporated into the ceremony.

== Eligibility ==
Any work submitted for the award must be an original piece for radio and may also include the first episode from an original series or serial first transmitted within the United Kingdom of Great Britain and Northern Ireland over the year before the year of the award and scheduled for transmission to 31 October in the year of the award. The award for each year is presented in January of the following year.

30-minute plays are eligible, provided that they are stand-alone and that characters and situations are original to the writer. Adaptations for radio of pieces originally written for other mediums are not eligible. The entry fee is £50.

== Past winners ==
- 2024: Cracking by Shôn Dale-Jones
- 2023: End of Transmission by Anita Sullivan
- 2022: Blis-ta by Sonya Hale
- 2021: Tristram Shandy: In Development by Christopher Douglas
- 2020: The Hartlepool Spy by Ian Martin
- 2019 When The Pips Stop, Oliver Emanuel
- 2018 Borderland, Sarah Woods
- 2017 Comment is Free, James Fritz
- 2016 Fugue State, Julian Simpson
- 2015 Goodbye, Morwenna Banks
- 2014 Marathon Tales, Hannah Silva and Colin Teevan
- (2013 Year changed to reflect date of award, rather than the drama's transmission)
- 2012 Kafka the Musical, Murray Gold
- 2011 Gerontius, Stephen Wyatt
- 2010 Ivan and the Dogs, Hattie Naylor
- 2009 Goldfish Girl, Peter Souter
- 2008 Memorials to the Missing, Stephen Wyatt
- 2007 Not Talking, Mike Bartlett and To Be A Pilgrim, Rachel Joyce
- 2006 Beast, Nick Warburton
- 2005 Norman, Mike Stott
- 2004 Killing Maestros, Christopher William Hill
