= Nis-Momme Stockmann =

German writer and theater director (born 1981)

Nis-Momme Stockmann (born 17 August 1981 in Wyk auf Föhr, on a North Frisian Island) is a German writer and theater director. His work includes plays, radio plays, prose, essays and poetry. He also teaches dramaturgy and scenic writing at the Zurich University of the Arts and at the Academy of Arts in Ludwigsburg.

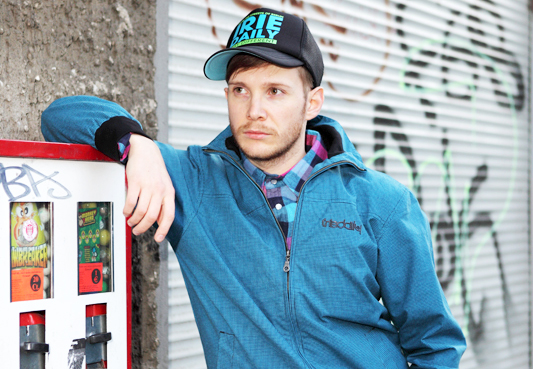
Nis-Momme Stockmann in Berlin, 2009

== Biography ==
Nis-Momme Stockmann went to Duborg-Skolen, a Danish gymnasium operated by members of the Danish minority of Southern Schleswig. After graduating from school he studied Tibetian Language and Culture in Hamburg, Media Studies in Odense (Denmark) and was trained as a cook. In 2008 he started studying scenic writing at the Universität der Künste Berlin.

Since 2002, he has been working as a freelance artist - writing, filming, photographing and painting/drawing. In 2005 he founded the „Laboratorium“ - a studio and housing project in an empty primary school.

His multi-award-winning debut play The Man Who Ate The World premiered on 17 December 2009. Since then the play has been restaged at numerous theaters – among others at the Residenztheater München and the Theater Basel. His plays have been performed at the Deutsches Theater Berlin, Schauspiel Frankfurt, Staatstheater Stuttgart, Residenztheater München, Staatstheater Hannover and Badisches Staatstheater Karlsruhe. They have been translated into several languages and are also staged abroad, e.g. in France, Denmark, Italy and Japan.

Since the 2009/10 season he has been writer in residence at Schauspiel Frankfurt.

== Journey to Japan ==
In February 2012, on the invitation of the Goethe Institute of Japan, Stockmann travelled to Tokyo and from there to the protection zone of the destroyed reactor Fukushima-Daiichi. In his blog http://stockmann.posterous.com Stockmann reported about his journey and wrote about his impressions and encounters. Among many interviews, he also wrote a report for the magazine Konkret (April 2012).

On the basis of his travel journals a scenic collage with the title Happy Island was presented at the Deutsches Theater Berlin.

== Awards and Fellowships ==
2005

- Stockmann wins the First Prize for his short film Ignorans at the International Filmfestival in Odense (DK)

2009

- Stockmann receives the Main Prize and the Audience Choice Award for his play The Man Who Ate The World at the Heidelberger Stückemarkt
- He wins the Stückemarkt Commission of the Berliner Theatertreffen[6].
- The play No Ship Will Come is produced by Staatstheater Stuttgart and is nominated for the Mülheim Dramatist’s Prize[7].
- Together with four writers Stockmann was a scholar at the Düsseldorfer Autorenlabor led by Thomas Jonigk.
- The Man Who Ate The World is chosen one of the best European plays by the European Theater Convention – ETC.[12]

2010

- He receives the Schiller Memorial Prize’s Promotional Fellowship.
- The Man Who Ate The World is invited to the Theaterbiennale Wiesbaden New Plays From Europe“.
- The Blue Blue Sea – his first play written as author in residence at the Schauspiel Frankfurt – is invited to the Autorentheatertage at the Deutsches Theater Berlin.
- Stockmann is named young dramatist of the year in the Theater Heute critics’ survey.

2011

- He receives the Friedrich-Hebbel-Preis. The jury justifies its decision with the fact that Stockmann „has revived the German theater scene with his plays“.
- In June, Stockmann is invited to the Festival of European Contemporary Playwrights in Copenhagen.

2012

- In February, Stockmann is invited by the Goethe-Institut Japan and by Tokyo Wonder Site for a one-month residency.
- In April, he is invited to the Festival „New Plays“ at the Théâtre de la Manufacture Nancy, Lorraine and in May to the Festival "Regards croisés" in Grenoble.
- Since May he has been Artist in Residence at the KKI-Laboratorium

== Author in Residence in Frankfurt ==
From the 2009/10 season to the 2011/12 season Stockmann has been author in residence at the Schauspiel Frankfurt.

His first play written as author in residence The Blue Blue Sea premiered on 22 January 2010 at the Kammerspiele. It was directed by Marc Langhuss. The radio play version was produced and broadcast by RBB, brought to live by Milan Peschel, Jaecki Schwarz and Chris Pichler in the main roles.

Stockmann also wrote and created a literary Varieté in Frankfurt: Herkules Manhattans’ Holistic Compendium of Modern Being Christian Prasno (Video), Les Trucs (Music), Yassu Yabara (Stage).

In addition, he runs a literary blog on the website of Schauspiel Frankfurt – Stockmanns’ Appendix.

In the 2010/2011 season his second play Die Ängstlichen und die Brutalen premiered in Frankfurt.

Der Freund krank was his third and last work as author in residence in Frankfurt. It premiered on 27 April 2012.

== Collaboration with Les Trucs ==
Stockmann works with the 2-piece-thing-orchestra Les Trucs. Together they created the "transmedial Varieté" Herkules Manhattans Holistic Compendium of Modern Live at the Schauspiel Frankfurt. They also developed and created the theaterproduction "Expedition und Psychiatrie" at the Theater Heidelberg. In April 2012, they toured with "Fuchs frisst Weltraum" – a micro-tour with lyric and music.

== Works ==
- "Der Mann der die Welt aß / The Man Who Ate the World" (Theater und Medien Schaefersphilippen); Premiere: 17 December 2009, Theater der Stadt Heidelberg, director: Dominique Schnitzer
- "Das blaue blaue Meer / The Blue Blue Sea" (Theater und Medien Schaefersphilippen); Premiere: 22 January 2010, Schauspiel Frankfurt, director: Marc Lunghuss
- "Kein Schiff wird kommen / No Ship Will Come" (Theater und Medien Schaefersphilippen); Premiere: 19 February 2010, Staatstheater Stuttgart, director: Annette Pullen
- "Inga und Lutz - Oder: Die potentielle Holistik eines Schnellkochtopfs im Kosmos des modernen Seins" (Theater und Medien Schaefersphilippen); Premiere: 8 October 2010, Staatstheater Braunschweig, director: Alexis Bug
- "Die Ängstlichen und die Brutalen" (Theater und Medien Schaefersphilippen); Premiere: 2 November 2010, Schauspiel Frankfurt, director: Martin Klöpfer
- "Expedition und Psychiatrie" (Theater und Medien Schaefersphilippen); Premiere: 4 March 2011, Theater der Stadt Heidelberg, director: Nis-Momme Stockmann
- Der Freund krank (Theater und Medien Schaefersphilippen); Premiere: 27 April 2012, Schauspiel Frankfurt, director: Martin Schulze
- Tod und Wiederauferstehung der Welt meiner Eltern in mir (Theater und Medien Schaefersphilippen); Premiere: September 2012, Staatstheater Hannover, director: Lars-Ole Walburg
- "The Power" (명동예술극장; Myungdong Theatre in Seoul, South Korea); World Premiere: 5 June 2015, National Theatre of Korea, director: Alexis Bug
