= Paul Hilton (actor) =

English actor (born 1970)

- Born: 1970 (age 55–56); Oldham, Lancashire, England, United Kingdom
- Education: North Chadderton School; Royal Welsh College of Music & Drama
- Occupation: Actor
- Years active: 1997-present
- Spouse: Anastasia Hille
- Children: 2

Paul Hilton (born 1970) is an English actor on stage, radio, and TV. He is an alumnus of the Royal Welsh College of Music & Drama.

== Early life ==
Hilton was born in Oldham, Lancashire in 1970 to Dorothy and David Hilton. He has described his background as working-class, "a million miles away" from the theatre world that he now works in.

Hilton said to have been inspired to pursue acting by his drama teacher at North Chadderton School, as well as his school trips to local theatres in and around Manchester. “I was intoxicated by regional theatre. At Oldham Coliseum Theatre, I saw the thing that I could be and, once I’d done my first school play aged 14, there was no stopping me.”

Hilton trained at the Royal Welsh College of Music & Drama and moved to London upon graduation.

== Career ==
=== Acting ===
Hilton's work ranges from radio drama, television series and features, as well as film and theatre.

Hilton has appeared in TV programmes including Garrow's Law (as freethinker Joseph Hamer), The Bill, Silent Witness, Wire in the Blood, Midsomer Murders (in the episode "The Oblong Murders"), Robin Hood, and has had regular character roles in True Dare Kiss (as Dennis Tyler) and Casualty 1909 (as Henry Percy Dean). Since 2008, he has starred as William Palmer/Pilgrim in the BBC Radio 4 supernatural drama series Pilgrim.

Hilton also appeared in the film Klimt and as Mr. Earnshaw Snr. in Andrea Arnold's 2011 adaptation of Wuthering Heights.

In 2010, he appeared as Sandy in Mark Haddon's play Polar Bears at the Donmar Warehouse, and in 2011 played the title role in Marlowe's Doctor Faustus at Shakespeare's Globe. In July 2015, he was part of the premiere cast of Damon Albarn's musical Wonder.land at the Manchester International Festival. For director Rufus Norris he was The Boson in Lucy Kirkwood's Mosquitoes (2017) at London's National Theatre.

He played the character of The Fool in the Deep Time Walk Mobile Guide, produced in 2016/7 by Jeremy Mortimer.

He appeared as Alexander, the husband of the protagonist Katherine (played by Florence Pugh) in the 2016 film Lady Macbeth, which transposed the action of the novel by Nikolai Leskov to the Northeast of England.

In 2017, he starred in the title role in a National Theatre Live production of Peter Pan.

He played the part of David Holmes in the television drama series A Very English Scandal, based upon John Preston's non-fiction book about the Thorpe affair.

In 2018, Hilton played E. M. Forster in the world premiere of Matthew Lopez's play The Inheritance at London's Young Vic, reprising his role in the West End (at Noël Coward Theatre) and Broadway transfers (at Ethel Barrymore Theatre). In 2020, he received a Tony Award nomination for Best Featured Actor in a Play, a Drama League Award nomination for Distinguished Performance, and won the Drama Desk Award for Outstanding Featured Actor in a Play for his performance.

In 2023 and 2024, he played Father Manders in Henrik Ibsen's play Ghosts in the Sam Wanamaker Playhouse.

In 2024, Hilton played Peter Stockmann in an adaptation of Ibsen's An Enemy of the People at Duke of York's Theatre. This performance led to his nomination for Best Actor in a Supporting Role at the Lawrence Olivier Awards in the same year.

From September until November 2024, he starred as 'Joxer' Daly in Juno and the Paycock at the Gielgud Theatre.

From 12 November 2025 to 10 January 2026, Hilton starred as Ebeneezer Scrooge in A Christmas Carol at the Old Vic.

=== Audiobook ===
Hilton narrated the audiobook version of Mark Bowles's debut novel, All My Precious Madness, co-published by Galley Beggar Press and Spiracle in 2025. For this work, Hilton was nominated in the New Voice and Best Audiobook Fiction categories in the inaugural British Audio Awards. He won the latter.

Hilton's narration of All My Precious Madness was also highly acclaimed by critics. The Bookseller noted his ability to "[capture] all the emotion, empathy and humour". The Guardian praised that Hilton "brilliantly inhabits [the protagonist's] hopeless grouch and conveys his many contradictions".

== Personal life ==
Hilton is married to actress Anastasia Hille and they have two adult children.

Hilton identified as "bicurious and fluid" as a teenager during the AIDS crisis in the 1980s. He credited the role of E.M. Forster in The Inheritance for "allow[ing] me to unearth aspects of myself that I hadn’t really addressed from my earlier years".

In 2023, Hilton was among the signatories of the campaign led by actress Julie Hesmondhalgh to save the Oldham Coliseum Theatre in his hometown from closure. The campaign succeeded in reversing Oldham's decision to demolish the building, as well as securing a £10 million refurbishment. The venue is set to reopen in 2026.

== Filmography ==
=== Film ===
Year	Title	Role	Notes
2006	Klimt	Duke Octave	
2010	Edge	Glen	
2011	Wuthering Heights	Mr. Earnshaw	
2012	Doctor Faustus	Dr. Faustus	
2015	London Road	Tim	
2015	Swansong	Mark Prince	
2016	Lady Macbeth	Alexander Lester	
2019	Eternal Beauty	Tony	
2021	Earwig	Albert Scellinc	
2025	Wake Up Dead Man: A Knives Out Mystery	Reverend Delancy	

=== Television ===
Year	Title	Role	Notes
1997	The Bill	John Palmer	Episode: "Added Bonus"
2004	Silent Witness	William Gould	Series 8, 2 episodes
2004	The Last Dragon	Dr. Tanner	Docufiction
2005	Wire in the Blood	Lawrence James	Episode: "Bad Seed"
2005	Princes in the Tower	King Henry VII	Television film
2006	The Family Man	Philip Dickson	Television film
2007	Trial & Retribution	Lee Casper	2 episodes
2007	Dalziel and Pascoe	Oliver Taylor	2 episodes
2007	True Dare Kiss	Dennis Tyler	6 episodes
2007	The Relief of Belsen	Leslie Hardman	Television film
2008	Heist	Adam de Warefield	Television film
2009	Robin Hood	Sir Roger	Episode: "Bad Blood"
2009	Casualty 1909	Henry Percy Dean	Main role; 6 episodes
2009	Garrow's Law	Joseph Hamer	Episode #1.4
2011	The Sinking of the Laconia	Henry Bates	Miniseries; 2 episodes
2011	Silk	Gary Rush	4 episodes
2011	Twenty Twelve	Jason Topper	Episode: "Raising The Bar"
2011	Midsomer Murders	Dominic Segal	Episode: "The Oblong Murders"
2012	Room at the Top	Bob Storr	2 episodes
2012	Labyrinth	Francois	Miniseries; 2 episodes
2013	Case Histories	Fergus Banks	Episode: "Jackson and the Women"
2014	The Crimson Field	Pte. Greville Parry	Episode #1.6
2014	The Driver	Blake	Episode #1.3
2014	Grantchester	Robert Miller	Episode #1.6
2018	Moving On	Ben	Episode: "Invisible"
2018	A Very English Scandal	David Holmes	2 episodes
2019	The Crown	Michael Straight	Episode: "Olding"
2022	Slow Horses	Robert Hobden	4 episodes
2023	All Creatures Great and Small	Clifford Slavens	Episode: "Broodiness"
2025	Silent Witness	Grant Townsend	Series 28, 2 episodes
2025	A Cruel Love: The Ruth Ellis Story	Christmas Humphreys	Episode #2

== Awards and nominations ==
Year	Award	Category	Work	Result
1998/99	Ian Charleson Award		As You Like It	Third Prize
2004	Laurence Olivier Awards	Best Actor in a Supporting Role	Mourning Becomes Electra – National Theatre Lyttelton	Nominated
2020	Tony Award	Best Featured Actor in a Play	The Inheritance – Ethel Barrymore Theatre	Nominated
2020	Drama Desk Award	Outstanding Featured Actor in a Play	The Inheritance – Ethel Barrymore Theatre	Won
2020	Drama League Award	Distinguished Performance	The Inheritance – Ethel Barrymore Theatre	Nominated
2024	Laurence Olivier Awards	Best Actor in a Supporting Role	An Enemy of the People – Duke of York's Theatre	Nominated
2025	The British Audio Awards	Best Audiobook: Fiction	Narrator of the audiobook version of All My Precious Madness by Mark Bowles	Won
2025	The British Audio Awards	Best Performance: New Voice	Narrator of the audiobook version of All My Precious Madness by Mark Bowles	Nominated
