= Hattie Naylor =

English playwright

Hattie Naylor is an English playwright whose 2009 Ivan and the Dogs won the Tinniswood Award for original radio drama and was nominated in the 2010 Olivier Awards for Outstanding Contribution to Theatre. She is a lecturer in stage and screen at Sheffield Hallam University.

== Early life and education ==
Naylor studied dance at Nottingham Trent University and fine art at Slade School of Fine Art. She then studied at the Desmond Jones School for Mime and Physical Theatre, and completed one year of an MA in screenwriting at the London College of Printing.

== Writing ==
Naylor has had more than 50 plays broadcast on BBC Radio 3 or BBC Radio 4.

Her first play, The Box, was broadcast in 1988 as part of Radio 4's "Young playwrights festival".

Her 2009 Ivan and the Dogs won the Tinniswood Award for original radio drama and was nominated in the 2010 Olivier Awards for Outstanding Contribution to Theatre. It has since been developed into a film directed by Andrew Kôtting called Lek and the Dogs (2018).

Other productions include Weighting Extraordinary Bodies, national tour 2015/16. Her work as a librettist includes Piccard in Space with Will Gregory (Goldfrapp) directed by Jude Kelly, for the Electronica Festival at the Southbank 2012. The Night Watch, her adaptation of Sarah Water’s novel, Manchester Royal Exchange, was listed as one of the top theatre plays of the year by the Suzanna Clapp, Observer for 2016. Further credits include Yana and the Yeti with Pickled Image 2017, and As the Crow Flies Pentabus and Salisbury Playhouse 2017. Going Dark was co-written and created with Sound&Fury, Young Vic and Science Museum 2013/14, and her controversial Bluebeard directed by Lee Lyford and created with their own company Gallivant, Soho theatre, Bristol Old Vic 2013. She has written extensively for BBC Radio 4 notably: The Diaries Of Samuel Pepys nominated Best Radio Drama 2012, The Aeneid nominated Best Radio Adaptation, BBC Audio awards 2013, and How to Survive the Roman Empire, by Pliny and me 2015-2018. She is a lecturer in stage and screen at Sheffield Hallam University.

In 2018 she adapted Alexandre Dumas' The Three Musketeers for The Dukes' promenade production in Williamson Park, Lancaster; in her version D'Artagnan, played by LJ Parkinson, was a young woman aspiring to become a musketeer.

Her works include:

- The Night Watch, Royal Exchange, Manchester 2016
- The Diaries Of Samuel Pepys (2012)
- The Aeneid (2013)
- Bluebeard, Soho Theatre (2013)
- Going Dark co-written with Sound&Fury
- Redeveloping Weighting with Extraordinary Bodies, 2015
