= Shôn Dale-Jones =

Welsh writer and performer

- Born: Llangefni, Isle of Anglesey, Wales, UK
- Awards: Total Theatre Award (Floating 2006) Fringe First Award (Story of a Rabbit 2007, The Duke 2016) Tinnis Wood Award (Cracking 2024)
- Website: https://sdjproductions.co.uk/

Shôn Dale-Jones is a Welsh writer and performer. He is known for creating the character of Hugh Hughes, and being involved with Hoipolloi Theatre from its founding on the 21st of October 1994 to its close on the 20th of June 2020.

== Education ==
He was educated at the University of East Anglia graduating in 1990. Afterwards, he attended the Lecoq School of physical theatre in Paris from 1990–1992.

== Career ==
=== Theatre & Live Performance ===
Dale-Jones has written, directed and performed in a number of productions including The Imposter, My Uncle Arly and more recently The Doubtful Guest. In the guise of his character Hugh Hughes, Dale-Jones created three awarding-winning shows; Floating, Story of a Rabbit and 360. He was also nominated for the 2012 Offies for The Wonderful World of Hugh Hughes: Best Male Performance/Best Production/Best Entertainment & Best Music.

=== Radio ===
Dale-Jones has adapted and performed radio versions of five of his previous works as BBC Radio 4 afternoon dramas (Floating, A Disappearing Town, The Duke, Me and Robin Hood, Cracking). The 2011 radio adaptation of Floating, produced by James Robinson and written by Dale-Jones as well as Sioned Rowlands, won Best Scripted Comedy Drama in the 2012 BBC Audio Drama Awards.

=== Film & Other ===
Dale-Jones again wrote, directed and performed in his film How I Got Here. In 2012 he was developing an interactive website 'Invisible Town Stories'.
