= Christopher William Hill =

British playwright and children's writer

Christopher William Hill is a British playwright and children's novelist.

== Early life ==
Christopher William Hill was born in Truro, Cornwall.

== Career ==
Hill's first children's books were his series Tales From Schwartzgarten, consisting of four novels published between 2012 and 2015. The first book, Osbert The Avenger (2012), won the East Sussex Children's Book Award in 2014, and was shortlisted for both the Northern Ireland Book Award in 2013 and the Leeds Book Award in 2014. His fifth children's novel, What Manor Of Murder? was published in 2018.

He has written two plays, Multiplex and Heartbreak Beautiful, for the National Theatre's Connections festival. His play Mister Holgado was co-winner of Best Show for Children and Young People at the UK Theatre Awards in 2013. He has written many plays for BBC Radio 4, which include Killing Maestros (2003), starring Bill Nighy and Henry Goodman, which won the inaugural Tinniswood Award for the best original audio drama script in 2004; Love Me, Liberace (2004), starring Henry Goodman and Frances Barber; Accolades (2007), starring Ian Richardson as the British author and historian A. L. Rowse; Hush! Hush! Whisper Who Dares! (2013), starring Oliver Ford Davies as the British illustrator E H Shepard, and three plays about the writer and architectural historian James Lees-Milne: Sometimes Into The Arms Of God, The Unending Battle and What England Owes.

His comedies for BBC Radio 4 include two series of Tomorrow, Today! (2006-2008), Says On The Tin (2008), and two series of On The Rocks from 2013 to 2015. His comedy-drama series, Clutch, Throttle, Brake (2017) for the 15 Minute Drama slot in BBC Radio 4's Woman's Hour programme, starred Bill Paterson, Samantha Spiro and Alison Steadman.

He has previously written for The Guardian and he is a regular tutor at the Arvon Foundation.

== Bibliography ==
=== Plays ===
- Lam (Northcott Theatre, Exeter, 1999)
- Blood Red, Saffron Yellow (Plymouth Theatre Royal, 2001)
- Inglorious Technicolour (Stephen Joseph Theatre, 2006)
- Song Of The Western Men (Minerva Theatre, Chichester, 2002)
- Mister Holgado (Unicorn Theatre, 2013)
- Pinocchio (The Dukes, Lancaster, 2016)
- Clockwork Canaries (Plymouth Theatre Royal, 2018)

=== Radio drama ===
- Killing Maestros (BBC Radio 4, 2003)
- Love Me, Liberace (BBC Radio 4, 2004)
- Accolades (BBC Radio 4, 2007)
- Hindenburg (BBC Radio 4, 2009)
- Angarrack (BBC Radio 4, 2012)
- Hush! Hush! Whisper Who Dares! (BBC Radio 4, 2013)
- Sometimes Into The Arms Of God (BBC Radio 4, 2013)
- The Unending Battle (BBC Radio 4, 2013)
- What England Owes (BBC Radio 4, 2013)
- Clutch, Throttle, Brake (BBC Radio 4, 2017)

=== Radio comedy series ===
- Tomorrow, Today! (BBC Radio 4, 2006-2008)
- Says On The Tin (BBC Radio 4, (2008)
- On The Rocks (BBC Radio 4, (2013-2015)

=== Children's books ===
- Osbert The Avenger (Orchard Books, 2012)
- The Woebegone Twins (Orchard Books, 2013)
- The Lily-Livered Prince (Orchard Books, 2014)
- Marius And The Band Of Blood (Orchard Books, 2015)
- What Manor Of Murder? (Orchard Books, 2018)
