= Sara Gibbs =

British comedy writer and autism advocate

Sara Gibbs (born 1987) is a British comedy script writer, author of a memoir and autism advocate.

== Biography ==
Gibbs was a script writer for the British television shows HIGNFY, Dead Ringers, The News Quiz, The Now Show and The Mash Report, amongst others. She is the co-founder (Elsa Williams being the other) of The Daily Tism, an on-line satirical comedy sketch in the guise of a news site. Marketed as being by and for autistics, it is produced by Turtle Canyon Comedy. She variously serves as composer, executive producer, writer, and ensemble actor. She is also the writer, director and show-runner for the audio comedy podcast It's a Superpower?? which made its debut July 2026.

She grew up in East Grinstead, England in a culturally Jewish (which sustained her socially) New Age family who made occasional shul visits, and was given a Waldorf education. She is a graduate of the National Film and Television School's Writing & Producing Comedy course.

She was diagnosed with autism spectrum at thirty. She regards her diagnosis "like returning to my own planet" and explanatory of much of her lifelong experiences, behaviour and idiocyncracies.

== Memoir ==
Her 2021 memoir Drama Queen: One Autistic Woman and a Life of Unhelpful labels was well received.

== Personal life ==
Gibbs lives with her husband in southeast England, and is bisexual.
