= Joseph Wilde =

British playwright, screenwriter and dramatist

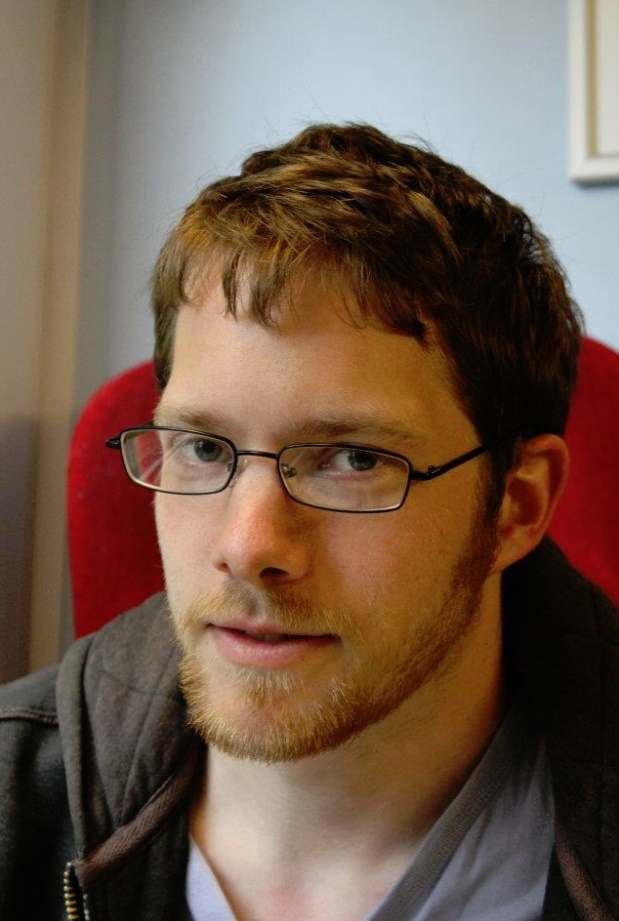
- Occupations: Screenwriter, Playwright

Joseph Wilde is a British playwright, screenwriter and dramatist.

== Career ==
In 2011, his debut play Cuddles won the Capital Theatre Award for Best New Play. Cuddles was then staged at Ovalhouse in May 2013, directed by Rebecca Atkinson-Lord (theatre director). The production was nominated for multiple Off-Westend Awards and subsequently toured the UK before transferring to 59E59 Theatres in Manhattan in 2015 where it was awarded a New York Times Critic's Pick and named as one of the best theater shows of 2015 by the New York Times. In 2016, the production was nominated for two Manchester Theatre Awards for Best Production and Best Performance. Actress Carla Langley won Best Performance for her role as Eve in the production.

His first radio play The Loving Ballad of Captain Bateman won the 2014 Imison Award for UK radio drama writing.

Since 2013, Wilde has written for long-running BBC Drama series Doctors. He later wrote on Casualty and the seventh episode of the second series of Sky's A Discovery of Witches.

In May 2016 Nicole Kidman and her production company Blossom Films announced that she had optioned the rights to "Cuddles" and that Wilde would be adapting the play for screen.

== Politics ==
One of Wilde's early plays, Last of the Pigs, was inspired by his home town's fight against a planned Tesco store. Supported by Hightide Festival, it documented the contrasting motivations of different generations - 20 somethings struggling in austerity Britain, who wanted jobs, and their parents' interest in maintaining a traditional town. The play became associated with the local council's decision to block the Tesco development in 2013. Local journalists even speculated Wilde's writings may have affected Tesco's sales.
