= Toby Swift =

British radio director (active 1999–2011)

Toby Swift (born 20th century) is a radio drama director and producer for BBC Radio.

His numerous credits, from 1999 to 2011, include the crime dramas The Recall Man and Trueman and Riley. He also directs contemporary and periodic radio dramas.

== Awards ==
Swift won the Prix Italia for Adapted Drama in 2004 for M, and again in 2005 for My Arm and for a third time in 2007 for Metropolis. The Loop won a Bronze Sony Radio Academy Award for Best Drama Production in 2010.

== Radio plays ==
Radio Plays Directed or Produced by Toby Swift
Date first broadcast	Play	Author	Cast	Synopsis Awards	Station Series
20 January 1999	Goodbye Moses	Jennie Buckman	Andrew Rajan, Dominic Carter, Angela Wynter, Giles Fagan and Elizabeth Conboy	As London swelters in a heatwave, Moses Perkes, a Trinidadian ghost, embarks on a quest to find his killers.	BBC Radio 4 Afternoon Play
12 July 1999	For The Love Of Strangers	Susan Stern	Kathryn Hunt, Robin Bowerman and Brigit Forsyth	Amidst the chaos of a family weekend, Jayne stumbles upon a dark and little-known episode in York's rich history – the 12th-century massacre of the city's Jewish population.	BBC Radio 4 Afternoon Play
13 September 1999 – 8 October 1999	Vital Signs (Note: Episodes 1–10 directed by Kate Rowland, 11–20 directed by Toby Swift)	Sarah Woods and Peter Straughan	Rachel Davies, Gillian Hanna, Derek Walmsley and Keith Drinkel	Carol Weaver, chief executive of the Nightingale NHS Trust, balances a difficult home life with complex issues of millennium planning.	BBC Radio 4 Woman's Hour Drama
30 June 2000	Gin and Rum	Philip Palmer	Caroline Catz and Philip Whitchurch	Every weekday Judy and Bob meet on the roof of a London office block for their lunch break. This romantic ghost story scratches beneath the surface of two lonely lives, offering a tantalising glimpse of the secrets of the city.	BBC Radio 4 Afternoon Play
8 September 2000	The Salt March	Nasser Memarzia	Paul Bhattacharjee, Josephine Welcome and Kulvinder Ghir	On 12 March 1930, Gandhi and 78 volunteers set out from Sabarmati Ashram to walk the 240 miles to Dandi in protest at the British-imposed salt laws. This bid to unite the Indian independence movement meant some difficult decisions for those in the villages en route.	BBC Radio 4 Afternoon Play
14 September 2000	Pot Shot	Jennie Buckman	Katy Cavanagh and Jonathan Coy	Hannah and Martin are trying for a baby. Unfortunately Hannah is trying rather harder than Martin whose behaviour becomes ever more strange the further down the road to fertility treatment the couple goes.	BBC Radio 4 Afternoon Play
8 December 2000	Soap Gets In Your Eyes	Brian B Thompson	Michelle Holmes, Peter-Hugo Daly and Duncan Preston	Danny is the chief storyliner on the nation's best-loved soap. It is his life, and he is even engaged to its wholesome leading lady. But when a new, hard-nosed, ratings-chasing producer arrives, his cosy life is turned upside down.	BBC Radio 4 Friday Play
29 December 2000	The League of Gentlemen	John Boland adapted for radio by Mike Walker	Jonathan Coy, Raymond Coulthard and Adam Kotz	A decade after the end of the Second World War, ex-major Gregory Hemmings recruits a team of disgraced former army officers to undertake a daring raid on a central London bank.	BBC Radio 4 Friday Play
23 January 2001	Fallen	Philip Palmer	Owen Teale, Francine Morgan, Robert Pugh and Steven Meo	Raymond Thomas quickly rose to become the youngest bank manager in South Wales. But then he had an affair, stole money, lost his job and went to jail. Can his family and the town accept him back, after he has so betrayed their trust?	BBC Radio 4 Afternoon Play
16 March 2001	Ecce Homo – Behold The Man!	David Napthine	Paul Bown, Helen Atkinson Wood, Philip Whitchurch and Rachel Atkins	Comedy in which Birmingham decides to appoint a philosopher-in-residence in a bid to improve its intellectual standing. From the moment when free thinker Diogenes Walker steps through the door, chaos envelops City Hall.	BBC Radio 4 Friday Play
28 April 2001	City of Spades	Colin MacInnes adapted by Biyi Bandele	Chiwetel Ejiofor, Raymond Coulthard, Ray Fearon and Clare Corbett	Nigerian immigrant Johnny finds himself caught up in the new ethnic subculture in 50s London.	BBC Radio 4 Saturday Play
17 June 2001	The Conquest of the South	Manfred Karge adapted by Anthony Vivis, from the translation by Anthony Vivis and Tinch Minter; Music by Simon Fraser	Matthew Dunster, James Weaver, Ralf Little, Andrew Lancel, Katy Cavanagh, Nicholas Gleaves, Lucy Akhurst and John Lightbody	Four of society's rejects seek to escape the depressing emptiness of their lives by acting out Amundsen's famous expedition to the South Pole.	BBC Radio 4
8 August 2001 – 12 September 2001 (Note: Although episode 6 was scheduled for 12 September 2001 its first broadcast may have been pre-empted by news coverage of world events and postponed until 31 July 2002)	Steven Appleby's Normal Life (Six episodes)	Steven Appleby	Paul McCrink, Rachel Atkins, Nigel Betts and Rosalind Paul	Cartoonist Steven Appleby takes an abnormal look at everyday life.	BBC Radio 4
30 September 2001 – 7 October 2001	The Faerie Queene	Edmund Spenser dramatised by Philip Palmer	Simon Russell Beale and Holly Aird	Inventive dramatisation of Edmund Spenser's towering Elizabethan epic poem.	BBC Radio 4 Classic Serial
27 November 2001	The Present	Jackie Pavlenko	Kathryn Hunt, Alice Gardiner, Christine Brennan, Jim Millea, James Swanton	Eva's life is a chaotic whirl of missed appointments and mad dashes as she tries to keep up with the demands of her children, her work and her withering social life. But only when she starts to keep a diary does the real problem emerge.	BBC Radio 4 Afternoon Play
7 December 2001	Doctor Joe Aston Investigates	David Napthine	Jeremy Swift, Rosie Cavaliero, Carolyn Pickles, Colin MacLachlan, Paul Brennen and Sue Scott Davison	Scientist Grace Hayle and her boss were working alone in the laboratory. Now he's dead and she's the only suspect in a murder case. She claims to have no memory of what happened and there's little evidence to go on. Forensic psychologist Dr Joe Aston, an expert in "recovered memory", attempts to uncover the truth. This single play later developed into The Recall Man series.	BBC Radio 4 Afternoon Play
4 January 2002	The Condition of the Virgin	Boothby Graffoe	Jason Isaacs and Nicholas McGaughey	Theological satire about a statue which shows some odd changes.	BBC Radio 4 Friday Play
17 April 2002	Trueman	Brian B Thompson	Robert Daws, Duncan Preston, Polly Hemingway, Katy Cavanagh, Richard Lintern and Sandra Clark	Was the murder of a student a drug wars killing, or are more sinister forces at work? The investigation falls to Trueman, a former high-flying detective. This single play later developed into the Trueman and Riley series.	BBC Radio 4 Afternoon Play
23 April 2002	The King's Coiner	Philip Palmer	Ian McDiarmid, Katy Cavanagh, Barnaby Kay, Jeremy Swift, Freddie Annobil-Dodoo, Peter Marinker and Colin Adrian	True life detective drama about Isaac Newton. By the 1690s Isaac Newton, already the world's greatest mathematician, was hungry for a new challenge and became Warden of the Royal Mint. His pursuit of London's most notorious counterfeiter, William Chaloner, confirmed him as a man prepared to go to any lengths to solve a problem.	BBC Radio 4 Afternoon Play
13 September 2002	Man with Travel Hairdryer	Katie Hims		The lives of many people are changed forever after an unarmed man is mistakenly shot dead by a police officer.	BBC Radio 4 Friday Play
7 November 2002	Tricycles	Colin Teevan	Laura Hughes, Conleth Hill, Cathy White, Abigail McGibbon, Nikki Doherty, Darran Williams, Packy Lee, Hannah R Gordon, Dario Angelone, Richard Dormer, Roger Jennings, Stella McCusker and Oisin Teevan	Colin Teevan's impressionistic and fast-moving drama dips in and out of everyday lives in Belfast to create a picture of a city and its people as they seek to make their modest dreams a reality. A suspected meningitis outbreak turns lives and routines on their head, perhaps for years to come.	BBC Radio 3 The Wire
19 December 2002	Full English	Brian B Thompson	Ray Burdis, Sheyla Shehovich, Bruce Byron, Sharon Duce and Ewan Bailey	Terry and Inna meet through a Russian internet dating agency. When she visits him in London, they are both in for some surprises. She's expecting opportunity and prosperity, but it doesn't always work out like that.	BBC Radio 4 Afternoon Play
2 February 2003	M	Thea von Harbou and Fritz Lang adapted by Peter Straughan	John Lightbody, Kevin McKidd, Nicholas Woodeson, Mark Lewis Jones, Jonathan Tafler, Gilly Tompkins, Ewan Bailey, Peter Marinker, Michael Wildman, Clare Corbett, Ben Crowe, Rebecca Manley, Cressida Whyte, Emily Button, Gregg Prentice, Ruby Stokes and Jack Durrant	Berlin is gripped with fear as a murderer preys on the city's children against a backdrop of political turbulence and rising criminality. Fritz Lang's cinema classic has been voted the most important German film of all time in its home country. Peter Straughan's kaleidoscopic adaptation exploits the emphasis Lang placed on sound in his first steps beyond the silent movie era. Won the Prix Italia for Adapted Drama in 2004.	BBC Radio 3 Drama on 3
19 February 2003 – 26 March 2003	Steven Appleby's Normal Life (Series 2) (Six episodes)	Steven Appleby	Paul McCrink, Rachel Atkins, Nigel Betts and Rosalind Paul	Cartoonist Steven Appleby takes an abnormal look at everyday life.	BBC Radio 4
1 May 2003	Creamie	Luke Sutherland	Clive Russell, Sophie Okonedo, Matthew Dunster, Indira Varma, Nicola Stapleton and Derek Ezenagu	As Glasgow cop Tony finds a surveillance operation unravelling spectacularly, his thoughts return to last summer and a turbulent reunion with the daughter he'd only seen once since her birth.	BBC Radio 3 The Wire
11 July 2003	At the Beach	Tom Kelly	Gerard Horan, Glyn Grimstead, Ben Tibber, Joseph Tremain and Ray Lonnen	Thirty years after they were last there, childhood friends Roy and Danny journey back to the remote beach where they shared an experience, and a secret, that has shaped their lives ever since.	BBC Radio 4 Afternoon Play
9 September 2003	Madonna's Plumber	Christopher Matthew	Robert Daws and Ted Robbins	Nigel Breezer, the self-styled plumber to the stars and star among plumbers, takes a tortuous trip to a film premiere in a courtesy limo giving him ample opportunity to give us the benefit of an insider's view of the famous and not-so-famous, as well as a few tricks of the trade.	BBC Radio 4 Afternoon Play
15 September 2003	A Fire in the West	Michael Butt	Ken Sharrock, Kate Fitzgerald, Lucy Akhurst and David K S Tse	Ciera Thomas set herself alight outside the Ministry of Defence, apparently in protest at a recent arms deal. There were no warnings, no final farewells. Three years later those left behind, her father, mother, sister, and a former boyfriend, bear witness to a shocking event, as they continue to try to make sense of what happened.	BBC Radio 4 Afternoon Play
31 October 2003	Making Waves	David Napthine	Jeremy Swift, Paul Brennen, Andrew Harrison, James Gaddas and Elizabeth Carling	A diver suddenly remembers what he thinks was a murder. Forensic psychologist Dr Joe Aston must try to make sense of his confused memory of that night. When the case reaches court, they both face tough sessions in the witness box.	BBC Radio 4 Afternoon Play
25 November 2003	Wild Lunch	Katie Hims	Claudia Harrison, Ben Miles, Richenda Carey, Ian Masters, Stephen Critchlow, Tracey Wiles and Kenny Blyth	A terribly civilised English lunch party gradually disintegrates on the day a man is hanged by an unspecified government. Even when the world is falling apart around them, there are those who will cling to the reality which suits them.	BBC Radio 4 Afternoon Play
14 December 2003	Serjeant Musgrave's Dance	John Arden; Original music by Simon Fraser	Iain Glen, Shaun Dooley, Paul Copley, Edward Hogg, Carolyn Pickles, James Weaver, Roger Walker, Katy Cavanagh, John Banks, Paul Rider, Jeremy Swift, John Davitt and Nick Malinowski	Four soldiers arrive in a strike-bound mining town intent on convincing its inhabitants that the violence and killing being perpetrated across the colonies in their name is wrong.	BBC Radio 3 Drama on 3
17 January 2004	The IPCRESS File	Len Deighton dramatised by Mike Walker	Ian Hart, James Laurenson, Jonathan Coy, Fenella Woolgar, Peter Marinker, Jamie Bamber, Kerry Shale, Adam Tedder, Rachel Atkins, John Sharian, Raad Rawi and Declan Wilson	Len Deighton's gripping cold war thriller became a popular icon of British cinema. Mike Walker's dramatisation re-discovers the novel and its unnamed and defiantly non-establishment narrator as his new job in the intelligence service ensnares him in a plot to brainwash scientists and trade them across the iron curtain.	BBC Radio 4 Saturday Play
18 February 2004	The Travels of Marco Polo	Philip Palmer	Conleth Hill and Paul Rhys	Marco Polo's famous and controversial book was written in a prison in Genoa at the end of the 13th century. It became one of the most popular in Europe, despite the common view that it was full of extravagant invention. Perhaps this account of Marco's relationship with the sceptical cellmate who wrote it all down involves a little invention too?	BBC Radio 4 Afternoon Play
23 April 2004	The Lights	Mark Tuohy	Luke Hamill, Cal MacAninch, Clare Cathcart, Marion Bailey, John Banks, Becky Hindley and Narinder Samra	Paul and Liam used to be best mates. Perhaps by the end of their weekend in Blackpool they'll have learnt to have a laugh together again. But it won't be easy not least because they've barely seen each other since the accident that changed their lives.	BBC Radio 4 Friday Play
5 June 2004	The Long Wait	Sarah Daniels, based on a story by Mike Walker		In Normandy on 5 June 1944, Nicole is getting ready to go out with her German boyfriend, despite the nightly air raids. A German army band is throwing a jazz concert in a hall in Caen when the singer, Mitzi, is called away on urgent business by Father Pierre. He is the blind, elderly padre who realises that his cover as a double agent has been blown, just as coded messages are coming through to the French resistance that the invasion is about to happen.	BBC Radio 4
1 July 2004	My Arm	Tim Crouch soundscape by Chris Dorley-Brown	Tim Crouch and Owen Crouch	'At the age of ten, for want of anything more meaningful to do, I put my arm above my head and kept it there. Now thirty years on, I'm so full of meaning, it's killing me.' This is a study of bloody-mindedness, modern art and how the things we do when we're ten stick with us for life. Won the Prix Italia for Adapted Drama in 2005.	BBC Radio 3 The Wire
11 July 2004	How Many Miles to Basra?	Colin Teevan	Michelle Fairley and Cal MacAninch	Set in Iraq in April 2003, a new drama exploring the aftermath of a fictional incident at a checkpoint near Basra.	BBC Radio 3 Drama on 3
6 December 2004	Lifestyles of the Trapped and Cabbaged	Roy Boulter	Paul Bown, Jeff Rawle and Wai-Keat Lau	Two holidaying accountants leave their wives in the lurch when they manage to get trapped in a Shanghai warehouse for days. Never have the social lives of the Cheshire set seemed so important.	BBC Radio 4 Afternoon Play
23 December 2004	Steven Appleby's Normal Christmas	Steven Appleby	Paul McCrink, Rosalind Paul, Nigel Betts, Ewan Bailey and Rachel Atkins	A Christmas special of Steven Appleby's Normal Life, in which Steven meets Father Christmas and his unfaithful wife, and finds out about legal problems regarding the toys the elves make.	BBC Radio 4
27 December 2004	Boxing Clever	Mike Yeaman	Thelma Barlow, Jeremy Swift, Edward Hogg, Helen Longworth and Paul McCrink	Wily pensioner Amy may be at the front of the queue for the Boxing Day sales, but she's going to have to work hard to get the better of the rival bargain hunters camping overnight outside Marshall's department store.	BBC Radio 4 Afternoon Play
16 March 2005 – 6 April 2005	The Great Pursuit (Four episodes)	Tom Sharpe dramatised by Ryan Craig	Mark Heap, Laurel Lefkow, Adam Godley, John Guerrasio, Sandra Dickinson, Nicholas Boulton, Susan Engel, Susan Jameson, Emily Wachter, Kerry Shale, Hugh Dickson, Robert Hastie and Alex Tregear	Anarchic satire about literary agent Frederick Frensic.	BBC Radio 4
8 April 2005	Family Cover	Jonathan Holloway	Polly Walker, Martin Wenner, Katia Linden, Jonas Finlay, Kim Romer, Jon Glover, Leagh Conwell and Thomas Brown-Lowe	A family holiday to Sweden goes tragically wrong when Alisdair McNair is found dead at a remote beauty spot. In shock, miles from home and with her two young sons in tow, Emma is alarmed to find herself the subject of the police investigation that follows.	BBC Radio 4 Friday Play
5 May 2005	Stone Baby	Sean Buckley	Louis Dunsford, Edna Doré, Carl Prekopp, Chenade la Roy John, Alex Matten, Joseph Tremain, Richard Katz, Susan Jameson, Nicholas Boulton and Hugh Dickson	Xavier has no brothers or sisters or mates at school. But he's got a bump. Something inside. Someone. He feels it move; hears its tiny heart beat in tandem with his. It's true and real and mine and... stop blowing smoke in my face! It's very bad for his health.	BBC Radio 3 The Wire
15 July 2005	Angel Heights	Brian B Thompson	Robert Daws, Duncan Preston, Michael Cochrane, Gerard McDermott and Sammy Dobson	A young stable jockey has been killed by a horse in what appears to have been an accident. When Trueman and Riley come sniffing round, they discover a corner of the horse racing world riddled with double-dealing: a trainer who deliberately runs horses over the wrong distance to bring down their handicap before landing a betting coup when they go over the right trip; a telephone tipster who gives one tip on his recorded message and a different one to his special clients; stable lads prepared to give inside information in return for favours. Can Trueman penetrate this closed world and discover the truth behind Emma Slater's death?	BBC Radio 4 Afternoon Play
12 August 2005	Blame	Philip Palmer	Caroline Catz, Ann Mitchell, Tanya Franks, Gerard Horan, Mark Lewis Jones and Harry Myers		BBC Radio 4 Friday Play
11 September 2005	The Orchid Grower	Sebastian Baczkiewicz based on an idea by Tom Mangold	Kenneth Welsh, John Cleland, Michael Murphy, Leo Vernik, Emma Campbell, Greg Ellwand, Rod Wilson, John Robinson, Tara Samuels, Chuck Shamata, Michael Caruana, Patrick McManus, Barry Flatman, Jonathan Higgins and Gerry Mendicino	In 1964, KGB officer Yuri Nosenko defected to the US in what should have been a major coup for the CIA. Sebastian Baczkiewicz tells the incredible story of Nosenko's four years of torture and imprisonment without trial as civil war raged within the CIA over his bona fides.	BBC Radio 3 Drama on 3
26 September 2005	Taken By Surprise	David Napthine	Jeremy Swift, Paul Brennen, Andrew Harrison, James Gaddas and Elizabeth Carling	A financial adviser is abducted and only released when his employer pays the ransom. Forensic psychologist Dr Joe Aston resorts to unorthodox methods to secure a positive identification of the main suspect.	BBC Radio 4 Afternoon Play
23 November 2005	The Waterbucks	Adrian Penketh	Geoffrey Streatfeild, Tracy Wiles, Mike Sengelow, Hannah Storey, Chooi Beh and Matthew Paris	Hong Kong, 1997. Justin has been riding out the last few months of British rule before the handover to China. This is not the only change he is forced to confront over the course of a tense 24 hours that will turn his life upside down forever.	BBC Radio 4 Afternoon Play
29 November 2005	French Sex at the Wilmslow Rex	Peter Vickers	Jason Done, Helen Longworth, Scarlett Perdereau, Pearce Quigley, Colleen Prendergast, Gerard McDermott, Harry Myers and John Cummins	In 1962, Bernard's innocent attempt to have the French new wave film 'Jules et Jim' shown at the local cinema leads to him being branded a pervert and an adulterer. The ensuing row also puts a strain on his marriage to Helen. A comic love story that captures a moment just before the 'swinging sixties' had begun to 'swing'.	BBC Radio 4 Afternoon Play
2 December 2005	Comeback	Luke Sutherland	Richard Ridings, Desmond McNamara, Stephanie Fearon, Tanya Franks, Richard Katz, Harry Myers and Everal A Walsh	Wrestling man-mountain King Magnitude is on the comeback trail at the age of 60. It may be 20 years since his glory days but he's determined to show the world he's still got what it takes. What he doesn't expect is to be floored by a 15-year-old girl.	BBC Radio 4 Friday Play
17 January 2006	Once a Friend	Stephen Phelps	Jamie Foreman, Gerard McDermott, Joseph Tremain, Steven Williams and Ella Smith	John and Leo, inseparable in childhood, meet for the first time in 30 years. Will Leo's need to rake over the past prevent them from rekindling their friendship?	BBC Radio 4 Afternoon Play
10 March 2006	After the Affair	Michael Butt	Claire Rushbrook, Daniela Denby-Ashe, Simon Grover and Christopher Fox	In the complex and messy world of an extra marital affair with all its exaggerated highs and lows, two couples are left facing a future they hadn't anticipated, and since Sarah and Janey are sisters, the sense of betrayal runs deep.	BBC Radio 4 Friday Play
24 March 2006	Metropolis	Thea von Harbou and Fritz Lang adapted by Peter Straughan	Edward Hogg, Tracy Wiles, Damian Lynch and Peter Marinker	Thea von Harbou's novel became husband Fritz Lang's 1927 silent movie classic. Its terrifying vision of the future was born in an age of booming heavy industry. Peter Straughan's new version finds its hero, F T Fredersen, caught up in a nightmarish world all too recognisably drawn from the one we find ourselves in today. Won the Prix Italia for Adapted Drama in 2007.	BBC Radio 4 Friday Play
13 June 2006	Headwrecked, Shanghaied and Shipless	Roy Boulter	Gabrielle Glaister, Katherine Dow Blyton, Liz Sutherland and Wai-Keat Lau	Two holidaying Cheshire housewives hit Shanghai and come off second best. Will they ever be reunited with their husbands? And where are they anyway?	BBC Radio 4 Afternoon Play
30 June 2006	The Conversation		Harry Towb and Jonathan Tafler	Dramatic reconstruction of a conversation between Trevor Friedman and Roman Halter, whose fathers were Jewish slave labourers in Poland and then Germany. Trevor knew almost nothing of his father's extraordinary story until 24 years after his death.	BBC Radio 4 Afternoon Play
13 October 2006	Walking the Line	Stephen Phelps	Andy Nyman, Ralph Ineson, Saikat Ahamed and Sam Dale	A prison officer finds himself caught between a vulnerable young prisoner and a senior colleague who believes that his job is to discipline and control and no more. Then the separate worlds of home and work start to overlap.	BBC Radio 4 Friday Play
21 October 2006	Cry Hungary	Paul Viragh	Lee Ingleby, Naomi Frederick, Christopher Fox, Larry Lamb, Mark Straker, Joseph Kloska, Sam Dale, Paul Richard Biggin and Emma Noakes	In October 1956, thousands of Hungarians rise up against the oppressive Soviet-backed government. Peter, a chosen son of the working classes, arrives in Budapest to study at the university. He falls in love with Eva, a committed communist. When Peter becomes involved in the demonstrations, Eva finds her loyalties severely tested.	BBC Radio 4 Saturday Play
18 December 2006	This Is My Car Park	Mark Tuohy	Adam Kotz, Pippa Haywood, Emma Noakes and Steve Edwards	Luke's brush with the big time has left him bruised and sleeping rough in a scruffy London car park. But why does he refuse to set foot outside it? Two locals strike up a friendship with him, but is it enough to restore his faith in humanity?	BBC Radio 4 Afternoon Play
18 February 2007	Hooligan Nights	Mike Walker; Music by Mike Woolmans	James Daley, Pamela Banks, Stephen Greif, Carl Prekopp, Gerard Horan, Freddy White, Gerard McDermott, Jamie Borthwick, David O'Dell, Sam Dale, Bethan Walker, Paul Richard Biggin, Joseph Kloska, Emma Noakes and Saikat Ahamed	The brutal world of London gangland in the 1890s is brought vividly to life in an innovative new musical created by writer Mike Walker and composer Mike Woolmans. Loosely based on the book by Clarence Rook, it recounts the criminal career of Alf, a self-styled Lambeth hooligan.	BBC Radio 3 Drama on 3
12 March 2007 – 15 March 2007	Trueman and Riley	Brian B Thompson	Robert Daws and Duncan Preston	Drama series about two bickering detectives. The stories are set in Leeds where Trueman and Riley solve a case in each episode.	BBC Radio 7
28 March 2007	Going for Broke	Mike Yeaman	Les Dennis, Felicity Montagu, Sam Dale, Christine Kavanagh and Jasmine Callan	With debts rising and their pension scheme in meltdown, Colin and Marion set out to milk the system for all it's worth. But will the price they pay be more than they bargained for?	BBC Radio 4 Afternoon Play
5 June 2007	Clear Air Turbulence	Dana Fainaru	Tara Fitzgerald, Aidan McArdle, David Thorpe, Ashley Madekwe, Ian Masters, Sandra James-Young, Rachel Bavidge, John Dougall, Jasmine Callan and Anthony Glennon	Mel's idyllic existence is turned upside-down when she suddenly stops sleeping. As the sprawling nights become filled in increasingly risky fashion, a would-be accomplice demands to join in the nocturnal adventures.	BBC Radio 4 Afternoon Play
13 June 2007	A Man Cut in Slices	Adrian Penketh	Raymond Coulthard, John Guerrasio, John Dougall, Colin Stinton, Tom Clarke-Hill, Walter Lewis, Bonnie Engstrom, Jasmine Callan, Anthony Glennon and Rachel Bavidge	Paul Tate goes for a job interview and finds himself on front pages and TV screens across the world. He is unwittingly cast as the symbol of Londoners' defiance in the face of terrorism after an office block is blown up.	BBC Radio 4 Afternoon Play
7 July 2007	Eye Witness	Tom Kelly	Michael Smiley, Michael Colgan, JonJo O'Neill and Ciarán McMenamin	This powerful and intensely personal piece digs deep into the author's brutalising experiences growing up on the streets of Belfast. Will life continue to be seen through the prism of that time, or can he find a future without the burden of the past?	BBC Radio 3 The Wire
2 August 2007	Is He Still Breathing?	Howard Belgard, co-written with Nick Drake	Zita Sattar, Geoffrey Whitehead, Andrew Frame and Rosalind Paul	Sunita loves her job at the ambulance call centre, the camaraderie, the humour and the satisfaction of helping people when they need it most. So why is she leaving?	BBC Radio 4 Afternoon Play
10 August 2007	Breaking Point	Philip Palmer	Elliot Cowan, Naomi Frederick, Bertie Carvel, Simon Treves and John Dougall	The effect of a man's recruitment to military intelligence rub off as his married life becomes a brutal game of cat and mouse.	BBC Radio 4 Friday Play
10 September 2007 – 14 September 2007	Nightingale Sang in Fernhurst Road	Christopher Matthew	Christopher Matthew, John Dougall, Ifan Meredith, Sam Pamphilon, Liza Sadovy, Kim Romer, Martin Hyder and Piers Stubbs	Christopher Matthew's gently comic tale of life in postwar suburban Surrey.	BBC Radio 4 Woman's Hour Drama
1 December 2007	Gulf	Mark Kotting	Steven Hartley, Ann Mitchell, Ben Onwukwe, Emma Noakes, Tilly Vosburgh, Simon Treves and Peter Marinker	Crazy golf takes on a whole new meaning in this fiery portrait of a family in meltdown, as 30 years of smouldering tensions finally reach their flashpoint.	BBC Radio 3 The Wire
3 February 2008	The Devil Was Here Yesterday	Colin Teevan; Original music by Nikola Kodjabashia	Owen Teale, Haydn Gwynne, Greg Hicks, Stephen Greif, Clare Higgins, Rufus Wright, Alex Lanipekun, Nadine Marshall, Martin Hyder, Nancy Crane and Laura Molyneux	Will civil servant Simon deliver the report the evidence appears to support or the report the minister seems to want the evidence to support?	BBC Radio 3 Drama on 3
19 March 2008	The City Speaks: Broken Chain	Mark Norfolk	Jeffery Kissoon, Jimmy Akingbola, Sheri-An Davis and Troy Glasgow	Short radio drama based on Peter Ackroyd's specially commissioned short story in which the Virgin Mary makes an appearance in the City of London. On the day Bert is released from prison, Leon takes him to see the Virgin.	BBC Radio 4 Afternoon Play
10 June 2008	Dropping Bombs	Paul Cotter	Rosemary Leach, Nigel Anthony, Ivan Kaye, Susan Engel, Kenneth Collard and Dan Starkey	Sixty five years after a bungled bombing raid, a former RAF pilot, with wife and son in tow, makes the long drive to Germany to deliver an apology. The trip turns out to be explosive for all concerned.	BBC Radio 4 Afternoon Play
6 July 2008	Piper Alpha	Stephen Phelps	Ewan Bailey, Nigel Betts, Kenny Blyth, Mark Bonnar, Liam Brennan, Stephen Critchlow, Ben Crowe, Nyasha Hatendi, Chris Pavlo, Roshan R Rohatgi, John Rowe, Dan Starkey, John Kay Steel and Joan Walker	On 6 July 1988, a North Sea oil rig was destroyed by a series of explosions and a massive fire, resulting in the death of 167 men. Based on Lord Cullen's Public Inquiry, the play chronicles the disaster minute-by-minute as it happened 20 years ago.	BBC Radio 3 Drama on 3
11 July 2008	One Chord Wonders: Parallel Lines	Frank Cottrell Boyce	Doon Mackichan, Siân Reeves, Rosie Cavaliero, Ivan Kaye, Paul Viragh, Joseph Tremain, Sarah Bedi, John Rowe and Ben Crowe	Frank Cottrell Boyce's series of plays about the punk generation 30 years on begins with the story of Julie, the singer in an ageing Blondie tribute band. An invitation to the reunion of the audience at an Adverts gig in 1977 brings some skeletons dancing from the cupboard.	BBC Radio 4 Friday Play
18 July 2008	One Chord Wonders: Blitzkrieg Bop	Frank Cottrell Boyce	Pauline Quirke, Adam Kotz, Manjinder Virk, Ivan Kaye, Ben Crowe, Harry Myers, Sanjay Shelat, Stephen Critchlow and Amy Enticknap	In 1977, self-styled Mo Motormouth was writing a punk fanzine. She now presents the travel news for a radio station. An attempt to relaunch her ailing career brings some unwelcome attention from her livelier listeners.	BBC Radio 4 Friday Play
25 July 2008	One Chord Wonders: Damned, Damned, Damned	Frank Cottrell Boyce	Richard Ridings, Lloyd Thomas, Chris Pavlo, Richie Campbell, Paul Richard Biggin, John Rowe and Ben Crowe	Hard man Mick's career in the music business imploded after a brush with an over-enthusiastic fan. Now in prison, can he find salvation in his treasured memories of 'that night' in 1977?	BBC Radio 4 Friday Play
1 August 2008	One Chord Wonders: This is the Modern World	Frank Cottrell Boyce	Danny Webb, Stephanie Leonidas, Ann Beach, Carl Prekopp, John Biggins, Alex Tregear, John Cummins, Sam Dale and Liz Sutherland	Earth toilet pioneer and former 'anarcho-punk' Muttley is living in an eco-commune in Wales with his teenage daughter, Lineel, when an invitation to the reunion turns up. Lineel is desperate to find out more about her late mother's previous life in Camberley. Muttley reluctantly agrees to accompany her on a pilgrimage back to his home town...on foot. There Lineel learns the unlikely truth about her parents' past, as well as getting an abrupt introduction to life in the 'real world' beyond the confines of the commune.	BBC Radio 4 Friday Play
8 August 2008	One Chord Wonders: Television's Over	Frank Cottrell Boyce	Kristopher Milnes, Freddy White, Gerard Horan, Fenella Woolgar, Leanne Rowe, James Daley, Ben Crowe, John Hasler, Amy Enticknap, John Rowe, Dan Starkey, Nyasha Hatendi, Sarah Bedi, Joan Walker and Tim James	March, 1977. Punk rock is rumoured to be arriving in suburban Surrey. Is anarchy about to overwhelm civilized society or is this salvation for the bored teenagers of Camberley?	BBC Radio 4 Friday Play
1 September 2008	Peter Lorre vs Peter Lorre	Michael Butt	Stephen Greif, Peter Marinker, Helen Longworth, Kenneth Collard, Nathan Osgood, John Rowe, Kerry Shale and John Chancer	Towards the end of his unique career, movie star Peter Lorre found himself at the centre of a strange legal case. Incorporating verbatim extracts from the court transcripts, Michael Butt's play wonders what was going through Lorre's troubled mind as he fought to protect his name.	BBC Radio 4 Afternoon Play
2 November 2008 – 9 November 2008	On The Beach	Nevil Shute dramatised by Mike Walker	Richard Dillane, Claudia Harrison, William Hope, Indira Varma, James Gordon-Mitchell, Jonathan Tafler, Inam Mirza, Stephen Critchlow, Chris Pavlo, Dan Starkey, Jill Cardo, Robert Lonsdale and Gunnar Cauthery	In the aftermath of a nuclear war, a deadly radioactive cloud is moving slowly towards Australia, one of few places on Earth where life still exists.	BBC Radio 4 Classic Serial
25 November 2008	Flaw in the Motor, Dust in the Blood	Trevor Preston	Rory Kinnear, Susan Engel, Fenella Woolgar, Janice Acquah, Paul Rider, Jonathan Tafler, Manjeet Mann and Inam Mirza	Exploration of life with bipolar disorder. When Thomas dreams, he's in the world of the crime thriller; his daily life is rather less glamorous.	BBC Radio 4 Afternoon Play
6 March 2009	Success Story	Brett Goldstein	Geoffrey Streatfeild, Caroline Catz, Sasha Pick and Laurel Lefkow	When Ray's low-budget film is picked up by a major studio his dreams of Hollywood start to become a reality. Then, holed up in a hotel room doing endless publicity interviews, he finds the past coming back to bite him.	BBC Radio 4 Afternoon Play
16 March 2009 – 20 March 2009	Trueman and Riley (Series 2)	Brian B Thompson	Robert Daws and Duncan Preston	Drama series about two bickering detectives. The stories are set in Leeds where Trueman and Riley solve a case in each episode.	BBC Radio 7
1 June 2009	The Tent	Tom Green	Siân Reeves, Jeremy Swift, Joanna Scanlan and Janice Acquah	Gavin and Fay bravely attempt to plan their long-overdue wedding. It could be in a 19th-century 'medieval' castle or it could be the zoo, but it definitely won't be the church.	BBC Radio 4 Afternoon Play
22 June 2009 – 26 June 2009	The Art of Deception	Philip Palmer	David Schofield, Indira Varma, Matt Addis, Jonathan Keeble, Belinda Lang, John Biggins, Malcolm Tierney, Philip Fox and Benjamin Askew	Notorious art forger Daniel Ballantyne, newly released from prison but now dying, agrees to help art critic Jessica Brown to write a book about forgery. So begins a game of cat-and-mouse that will have deadly consequences.	BBC Radio 4 Woman's Hour Drama
29 June 2009	Accomplices	Simon Passmore	Claudia Harrison, Emily Joyce, Stephen Hogan, Lizzy Watts and Paul Rider	What would you be prepared to do to escape the grind of a life going relentlessly downhill? For former City lawyer Alice, the price is getting higher by the minute.	BBC Radio 4 Afternoon Play
11 August 2009	The Mouse House	Adrian Penketh	Adam Kotz, Raquel Cassidy, Nicholas Gleaves, Giles Fagan and Stephen Hogan	Wannabe cultural terrorist Mike is determined to make a splash; make a statement; make more of his life. But has he got what it takes to pull it off and light up the skies above London?	BBC Radio 4 Afternoon Play
18 September 2009	The Milk Race	Mark Tuohy	Ivan Kaye, Amarjit Bassan, Kate Binchy, Mairead Conneely, Melissa Advani, Stephen Hogan, David Hargreaves, Kate Layden, Piers Wehner, Rhys Jennings, Tessa Nicholson and Emerald O'Hanrahan	Two west London milkmen race each other to Bognor Pier in their milk floats to decide which of them wins exclusive rights to their local round.	BBC Radio 4 Afternoon Play
21 October 2009	Those Hard to Reach Places	Daniel Thurman	Geoffrey Whitehead, Anne Reid, Janet Dibley, Piers Wehner and Emerald O'Hanrahan	'Cleaner...only dirtier' is a slogan unlikely to be used by your average domestic cleaner. But Rita is anything but your average domestic cleaner; as an unfortunate former mayor is about to discover.	BBC Radio 4 Afternoon Play
16 November 2009	Forty-Three Fifty-Nine - Wake	Katie Hims	Claire Rushbrook, Rachel Davies, John Lightbody, Emily Beecham, Tom Meredith, Kate Fitzgerald and David Webber	The story of Jess' day trip to kiss her dead first love, Danny, goodbye. One lie leads to another and, before they know it, Jess and her mother Avril are in a real pickle.	BBC Radio 4 Afternoon Play
18 November 2009	The Loop	Nick Perry	Ivan Kaye, Edward Hogg, Peter Marinker, Rhys Jennings, Emerald O'Hanrahan and Melissa Advani	When a young boy toys with his dad's mobile phone, middle-aged Englishman Nick Perry finds himself speaking to a young stranger called Jim in New York - in 1959. As they talk, they discover that they are both writers: Nick is struggling with his first radio play and Jim's just started on an ambitious new TV show, The Twilight Zone. Bronze Sony Award – Best Drama Production 2010	BBC Radio 4 Afternoon Play
6 December 2009	The Hairy Ape	Eugene O'Neill	Dominic West, Shaun Dingwall, Jim Norton, Sasha Pick, Annabelle Dowler, John Guerrasio, John Kay Steel, Joe Montana, Matt Addis, David Hargreaves, Stephen Hogan, Benjamin Askew and Philip Fox	Classic American expressionist drama from 1921. The play tells the tragic tale of Yank, a stoker whose whole world is turned upside down when a young heiress ventures into the engine room of a transatlantic ocean liner.	BBC Radio 3 Drama on 3
10 April 2010	The Believers	Frank Cottrell Boyce; Original music by Carl Hunter and Mel Bowen	Ray Quinn, Samantha Robinson, Kieran Lynn, John Biggins, Rufus Wright, Gary Bleasdale, Alison Pettitt, Joanna Monro, David Seddon, Laura Molyneux, Jill Cardo and Keely Beresford	Liverpool, 1963. The Merseybeat boom is about to take off. And with it, The Believers, a Christian pop band determined to spread the Word. If only they were all singing from the same hymn sheet.	BBC Radio 4 Saturday Play
30 April 2010	The Weighing Room	Justin Hopper	Lloyd Hutchinson, Michael Legge, James Weaver, Paul Rider, David Seddon, Alison Pettitt, Nigel Hastings, Joanna Monro, Bruce Alexander, Michael Shelford and Keely Beresford	Noel is a jump jockey anxious to get his career back on track after a spell on the sidelines. Just what does it take to survive in the demanding and dangerous world of National Hunt racing?	BBC Radio 4 Afternoon Play
10 July 2010	Going to Ground	Simon Passmore	Ivan Kaye, Anthony Flanagan, Rupert Evans, Guy Henry, Joshua Jenkin, Alison Pettitt, Christine Kavanagh and Sam Dale	1940, Kent. England is on full alert in anticipation of a German invasion. As church bells sound the alarm, a secret resistance unit springs into action. Whatever happens, none of them expects to see their families again.	BBC Radio 4 Saturday Play
22 August 2010 – 29 August 2010	No Highway	Nevil Shute dramatised by Mike Walker	William Beck, Alison Pettitt, Paul Ritter, Naomi Frederick, Fenella Woolgar, Lauren Mote, Tony Bell, William Hope, Jude Akuwudike, Sean Baker, Sam Dale, Michael Shelford, David Seddon and Christine Kavanagh	1948. The future of Britain's transatlantic aviation industry rests on the success of a new plane - the Rutland Reindeer. One has crashed already and an eccentric government scientist believes more will follow. The race is on to prove his theory before Reindeers start to fell from the sky.	BBC Radio 4 Classic Serial
22 September 2010	For Ever England	Tom Green	Gerard Horan, Claire Harry, Tracie Bennett, Alison Pettitt and Carl Rice	Now living abroad, Steve discovers his estranged son Matt has been killed serving in Afghanistan. He returns to England anxious to do the right thing. But how do you begin to grieve for a child you never really knew?	BBC Radio 4 Afternoon Play
20 December 2010 – 24 December 2010	The Art of Deception	Philip Palmer	David Schofield, Hattie Morahan, Matt Addis, Harry Myers, Stephen Greif, Pandora Colin, Jude Akuwudike, Sally Orrock and Iain Batchelor	Two years after faking his own death, notorious art forger and conman Daniel Ballantyne re-emerges to resume his cat and mouse game with biographer Jessica Brown.	BBC Radio 4 Woman's Hour Drama
21 January 2011	The Wild Ass's Skin Reloaded	Honoré de Balzac adapted by Adrian Penketh	Elliot Cowan, Naomi Frederick, Don Gilet, Chris Porter, Inam Mirza, Lloyd Thomas, Sally Orrock, Jude Akuwudike and Christine Kavanagh	Balzac's classic novel is relocated to contemporary London. Rupert, an unemployed investment banker, is distracted from his suicidal despair by a magic skin which can grant his every wish. Inevitably, there is a price to pay.	BBC Radio 4 Friday Play
6 February 2011	Massistonia	Colin Teevan; Original music by Nikola Kodjabashia	Darren Boyd, Nikola Kodjabashia, Ewan Bailey, Sasha C. Damjanovski, Dolya Gavanski, Ivan Marevich, Iain Batchelor and Leah Brotherhead	A tale of Western hubris and Eastern European manipulation of the system, 'Massistonia' follows an English theatre director and his creative team as they try to mount an international touring production of 'Alcmaeon in Corinth'. He embarks on the project with little idea of the forces about to be unleashed against him.	BBC Radio 3 Drama on 3
15 March 2011	Small Acts of Kindness	Trevor Preston	Stephen Greif, Ann Beach, Susan Penhaligon, Joanna Monro, Sean Baker, Gethin Anthony, Sally Orrock and Christine Kavanagh	In the late 1950s Charlie was a violent and uncontrollable entrant to art school. His teacher changed the course of his life. In his late sixties his mentor's death shifts everything once more.	BBC Radio 4 Afternoon Play
8 June 2011	The 40 Year Twitch	Daniel Thurman	Paula Wilcox, Philip Jackson, Anne Reid and Brian Bowles	When Yvonne loses her job at the age of 64, she starts to fear that husband Neil's devotion to birding - birdwatching to the uninitiated - is actually all about escaping her and their humdrum life together. Thus begins a somewhat overenthusiastic pursuit of the truth as she trains her binoculars firmly on Neil's every move. Can best friend Wendy bring her back to earth?	BBC Radio 4 Afternoon Play
27 August 2011	Life After Life	Frank Cottrell Boyce	Gbemi Ikumelo, Don Gilèt, Damian Lynch, Elaine Claxton, Susie Riddell, Alex Tregear, Carl Prekopp and Gerard McDermott	Miranda was undergoing what should have been a routine operation. Now she finds herself 'on the other side', but whatever notions of what the future might hold beyond her life on Earth Miranda may have had, they were certainly not like this. It's not even her afterlife, it's Toby's and he's in control. Inspired by the ways that internet users are increasingly responding to death online, Frank Cottrell Boyce's comic drama follows Miranda as she tries to make sense of the strange cyberworld she has been sucked into.	BBC World Service BBC World Drama
3 September 2011	September in the Rain	John Godber	John Godber and Jane Godber	Jack and Liz are in Blackpool for one last time. John Godber's classic stage play tells the touching and funny story of a marriage through a lifetime of holidays together.	BBC Radio 4 Saturday Play
15 October 2011	The Last Executioner	Peter-Jakob Kelting	Paul Copley, Ralph Ineson, Bryan Dick, Simon Bubb and Kenneth Collard	Switzerland, 1938. Triple murderer Paul Irniger has been sentenced to death. Over 120 men have spontaneously applied to be his executioner. Based on research by a psychiatrist at the time, Peter-Jakob Kelting's play imagines 5 of the applicants competing for the job.	BBC Radio 3 The Wire

Notes:

Sources:

- Toby Swift's radio play listing at Diversity website
- Toby Swift's radio play listing at RadioListings website
