= John Rowe (actor) =

British actor (born 1941)

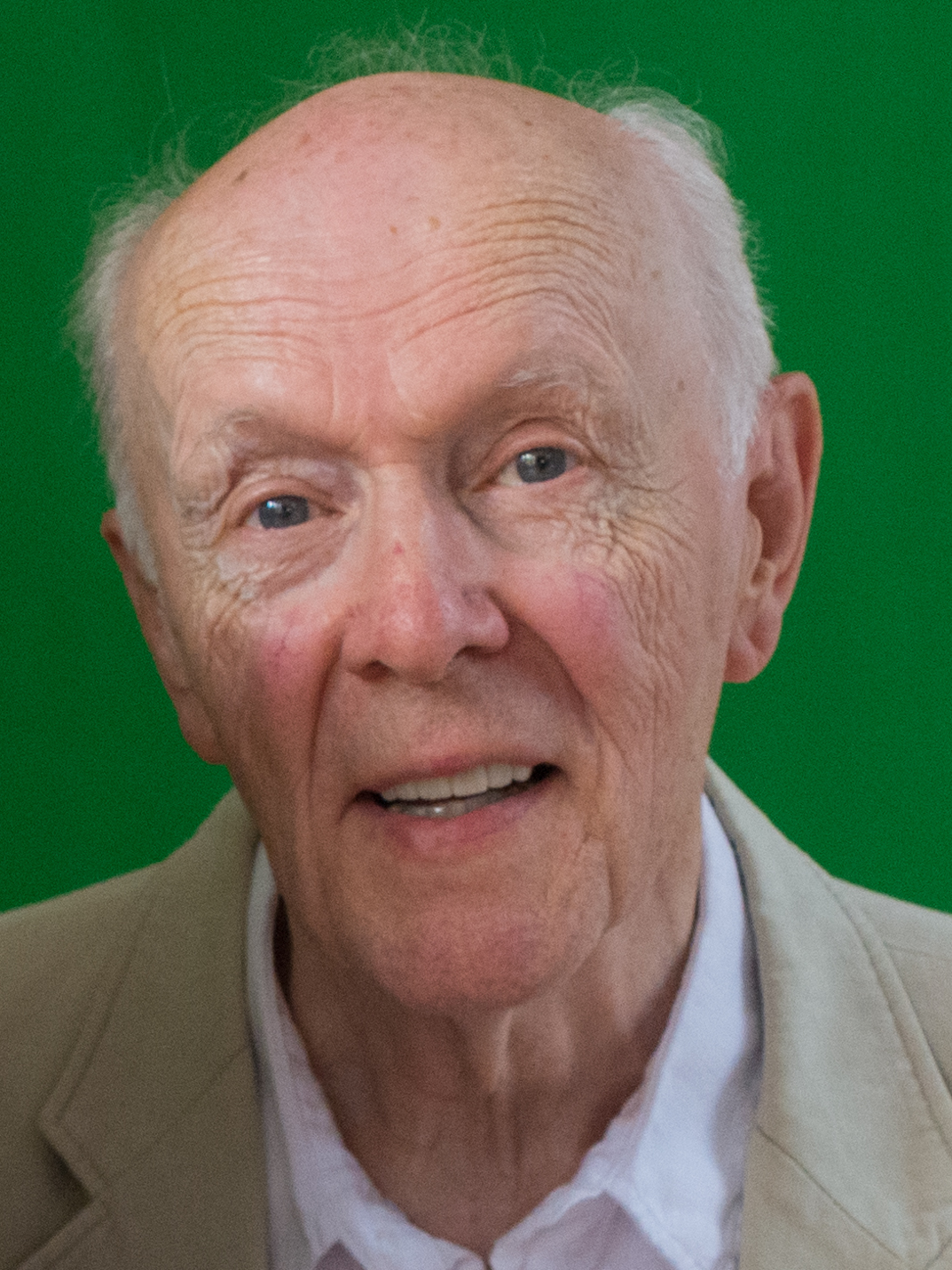
Rowe in 2019

John Rowe (born January 1941) is a British actor.

After reading English at Oxford he worked as a teacher before training at the Birmingham School of Speech and Drama. After some years in repertory theatre he joined the BBC Radio Drama Company at Broadcasting House and has been a prolific radio actor ever since, notably as Professor Jim Lloyd in The Archers. He has also played numerous character roles on television and film and his extensive stage work includes touring with the Old Vic in Europe, China, the Middle East and Australia.

== Filmography ==
=== Film ===
- The Chain (1984)
- Clockwise (1986)
- The Heart of Me (2001)
- Lagaan (2001)
- The Lost Prince (2003)
- Victoria & Abdul (2017)

=== TV ===
- BBC Television Shakespeare - Henry VIII (Cromwell, 1979)
- BBC Television Shakespeare - Macbeth (Lennox, 1983)
- Juliet Bravo (1980–85)
- When the Boat Comes In (Hector Smith-Jameson, 1981)
- Intimate Contact (Managing Director, 1987)
- Chambers (Judge Riseby, 1990)
- Agatha Christie's Poirot (The Cornish Mystery, 1990)
- Seekers (1992)
- The Final Cut (Sir Clive Watling, 1995)
- Trial & Retribution (2006)
- Law & Order: UK (series 5) (2011)
- Casualty (2013)
- Mr Selfridge (2015)
- BBC Television - Holby City Series 18, Episode 24: Who You Are (Thomas Bell Humphries, 2016)
- Vera (TV series) (2016 - episode: The Moth Catcher)
- The Crown (2016)
- Anna Lee (TV series 1994) as Commander Martin Brierly; Anna's boss

=== Radio ===
Date	Title	Role	Director	Station
March 1973	Henry IV Part 1 by William Shakespeare	Prince Hal	Martin Jenkins (Producer)	BBC Radio 3
1983	The Honourable Schoolboy	Peter Guillam	Roger Pine	BBC Radio 4
April 1984	An Uncommon Love by Michelene Wandor	Arthur Munby	Richard Wortley	BBC Radio 4
1992	Inspector Purbright- Charity ends at home by Colin Watson, dramatised by Christopher Denys	Inspector Purbright		BBC Radio 4
1997	The Chimes of Midnight by Nick Fisher	Jonathan Tempray	Marion Nancarrow	BBC Radio 4 Fear on 4 Drama
October 1997	Miss Marple: A Caribbean Mystery by Agatha Christie	Dr Graves	Enyd Williams	BBC Radio 4 Drama
30 July 1999	Flight to Arras by Antoine de Saint-Exupéry		David Hunter	BBC Radio 4 Afternoon Play
23 February 2004 – 5 March 2004	The L-Shaped Room		Alison Hindell	BBC Radio 4 Woman's Hour Drama
3 May 2004	Inspector Cadaver		Ned Chaillet	BBC Radio 4 Afternoon Play
23 January 2006 – 27 January 2006	To Serve Them All My Days	Howarth	Marc Beeby and Cherry Cookson	BBC Radio 4 Afternoon Play
2007–08, 2009–	The Archers	Jim Lloyd		BBC Radio 4
4 September 2007	The Architects	Alan & Policeman	Lu Kemp	BBC Radio 4 Afternoon Play
2008	The Karla Trilogy - Tinker, Tailor, Soldier, Spy; The Honourable Schoolboy; Smiley's People by John Le Carré	Control	adapted by Shaun McKenna	BBC Radio 4 Drama
27 January 2008 – 2 March 2008	Fortunes of War	Inchcape	Colin Guthrie	BBC Radio 4 Classic Serial
16 June 2008 – 4 July 2008	The Way We Live Right Now	Anthony Trollope	Jonquil Panting	BBC Radio 4 Woman's Hour Drama
17 June 2008	The Ring and the Book	The Judge	Abigail le Fleming	BBC Radio 4 Classic Serial
18 June 2008	Listen to the Words	Clive	Jessica Dromgoole	BBC Radio 4 Afternoon Play
6 July 2008	Piper Alpha		Toby Swift	BBC Radio 3 Drama on 3
11 July 2008	One Chord Wonders: Parallel Lines	Announcer	Toby Swift	BBC Radio 4 Friday Play
25 July 2008	One Chord Wonders: Damned, Damned, Damned	Announcer	Toby Swift	BBC Radio 4 Friday Play
8 August 2008	One Chord Wonders: Television's Over	Voke	Toby Swift	BBC Radio 4 Friday Play
1 September 2008	Peter Lorre vs Peter Lorre	Judge Burnett Wolfson	Toby Swift	BBC Radio 4 Afternoon Play
23 November 2008	The Pattern of Painful Adventures	Richard Burbage	Jeremy Mortimer	BBC Radio 3 Drama on 3
24 November 2008 – 28 November 2008	Aubrey's Brief Lives	Anthony Wood	Abigail le Fleming	BBC Radio 4 Woman's Hour Drama
16 March 2009	Where Three Roads Meet	Shepherd	Kirsty Williams	BBC Radio 4 Afternoon Play
11 June 2010	Philip and Sydney	Hotel Keeper & Drinker	Kirsty Williams	BBC Radio 4 Afternoon Play
22 December 2010	Alice Through the Looking-Glass	The White Knight	Stephen Wyatt	BBC Radio 4 Saturday Drama
3 November 2013	Sword of Honour	Peregrine Crouchback	Tracey Neale	BBC Radio 4 Classic Serial
7 January 2015	Wants and Desires: the Ferryhill Philosophers	Rollo Ironside	Marilyn Imrie	BBC Radio 4 Afternoon Play
14 February 2020	24 Kildare Road (episodes 7-10)	Joe Kelly	Mary Peate	BBC Radio 4

John Rowe has also appeared in two audio dramas published by Big Finish.
