= Jessica Dromgoole =

British director (active 1988– )

Jessica Dromgoole is a British director of contemporary theatre and radio-plays, as well as a former Artistic Director of the Finborough Theatre from 1988 to 1991. In 1991 she became New Writing Co-ordinator for BBC Drama, Entertainment and Children's programmes.

== Early life ==
Dromgoole is the daughter of schoolteacher Jenny Davis and Patrick Dromgoole, a former managing director of Harlech Television. Dromgoole is the older sister of Dominic Dromgoole and Sean Dromgoole.

== Selected awards ==
Year	Work	Award	Category	Role	Result	Ref.
2007	The Incomplete Recorded Works of a Dead Body by Ed Hime	Prix Italia	Original Radio Drama	Director	Won	
2012	Lost Property: The Year My Mother Went Missing by Katie Hims	BBC Audio Drama Awards	Best Audio Drama	Producer	Won	
2012	A Tale of Two Cities by Charles Dickens (dramatised by Mike Walker)	Sony Radio Academy Awards	Best Drama	Director	Bronze	
2018	Home Front by Katie Hims & Sarah Daniels	BBC Audio Drama Awards	Best Audio Drama (series or serial)	Producer	Finalist	
2019	Home Front	BBC Audio Drama Awards	Outstanding Contribution	Editor	Won	
2020	Home Front: A Fragile Peace by Katie Hims	BBC Audio Drama Awards	Tinniswood Award	Producer	Commendation	

== Radio plays ==
Radio plays directed by Jessica Dromgoole
Date first broadcast	Play	Author	Cast	Synopsis Awards	Station Series
31 March 2007	The Incomplete Recorded Works of a Dead Body	Ed Hime	Khalid Abdalla, Ameet Chana, Elaine Lordan, Saikat Ahamed, John Dougall, Mark Straker, Anthony Glennon and Jasmine Callan	Ed Hime's blackly comic fictional documentary combines a collage of deliberate recordings, from police surveillance tapes to an unfinished installation piece on pigeons, as it follows Babak Beyrouti, famous Iranian sound recordist and agoraphobic, as he braves London in his quest for lost love. Won the Prix Italia for Original Radio Drama in 2007.	BBC Radio 3 The Wire
18 June 2008	Listen to the Words	Ed Hime	Joe Dempsie, Lizzie Watts, Sam Crane, Lisa Stevenson, Nyasha Hatendi, Helen Longworth, Ben Crowe, John Rowe, Liz Sutherland, Stephen Critchlow and Dan Starkey	Tim has a problem with empathy, and justifies tapping fellow student Sophie's phone as the only way to understand her. When it all goes wrong, he books the media room of the secure unit where he is being held and creates a broadcast for his college radio station.	BBC Radio 4 Afternoon Play
2 August 2010 – 6 August 2010	The Shooting Party	Isabel Colegate dramatised by D J Britton	Olivia Colman, Ellie Kendrick, Sam Dale, Jaimi Barbakoff, Michael Shelford, Christine Kavanagh, Joshua Swinney, Sean Baker, Sally Orrock, Jude Akuwudike and David Seddon	Autumn 1913; a shooting party takes place on an Oxfordshire country estate. An error of judgement results in a death.	BBC Radio 4 Woman's Hour Drama
18 November 2010	All the Blood in My Veins	Katie Hims	Elaine Lordan, Shannon Tarbet, Tyger Drew-Honey, Katie Angelou, Alfie Browne-Sykes, Jude Akuwidike, Lloyd Thomas, Deeivya Meir and Shirena Watt	Viola, a 14-year-old girl, has responsibilities beyond her age.	BBC Radio 4 Afternoon Play
3 May 2011	Lost Property: The Wrong Label	Katie Hims	Rosie Cavaliero, Alex Tregear, Katie Angelou, Daniel Cooper, Daniel Rabin, Stuart McLoughlin, Bethan Walker, Sally Orrock, Sean Baker and Joanna Monro	London, 1941, and Alice knows that to stop your children from being evacuated is tantamount to siding with Hitler.	BBC Radio 4 Afternoon Play
10 May 2011	Lost Property: The Year My Mother Went Missing	Katie Hims	Rosie Cavaliero, Shannon Flynn, Cel Spellman, Elliot Griffiths, Ralph Ineson, Daniel Rabin, Jane Whittenshaw, Sally Orrock, Stuart McLoughlin and Sean Baker	It's 1979, and it's not the first time that Ruthie's mother Queenie has gone missing, but usually she leaves a note. Won the BBC Audio Drama Award for Best Audio Drama in 2012.	BBC Radio 4 Afternoon Play
17 May 2011	Lost Property: A Telegram from the Queen	Katie Hims	Rosie Cavaliero, Edna Doré, Gary Beadle, Daniel Rabin, Stuart McLoughlin, Sean Baker, Jane Whittenshaw, Alex Tregear, Joanna Monro and Sally Orrock	It's 2011, and, as Alice's 100th birthday present, Ruthie sets out to put her family back together again. The final play in Katie Hims' trilogy of heartbreak and redemption.	BBC Radio 4 Afternoon Play
26 December 2011 – 30 December 2011	A Tale of Two Cities (Note: Directed by Jessica Dromgoole and Jeremy Mortimer)	Charles Dickens dramatised in five parts by Mike Walker; Music by Lennert Busch	Robert Lindsay, Jonathan Coy, Alison Steadman, Karl Johnson, Lydia Wilson, Andrew Scott, Paul Ready, James Lailey, Tracy Wiles, Simon Bubb, Carl Prekopp, Adjoa Andoh, Daniel Cooper, Clive Merrison, Gerard McDermott, Paul Moriarty, Christopher Webster, Adam Billington, Rikki Lawton and Alex Rivers	In London and Paris before and during the French Revolution, these five episodes show the plight of the French people under the brutal oppression of the aristocracy in the years leading up to the revolution, and the corresponding savage brutality of the revolutionaries toward the former aristocrats in the years immediately following. Won the Bronze Sony Radio Academy Award for Best Drama in 2012.	BBC Radio 4 Afternoon Play

Notes

Sources

- Jessica Dromgoole's radio play listing at Diversity (suttonelms.org.uk)
- Jessica Dromgoole's radio play listing at RadioListings
