= Emerald O'Hanrahan =

English actress

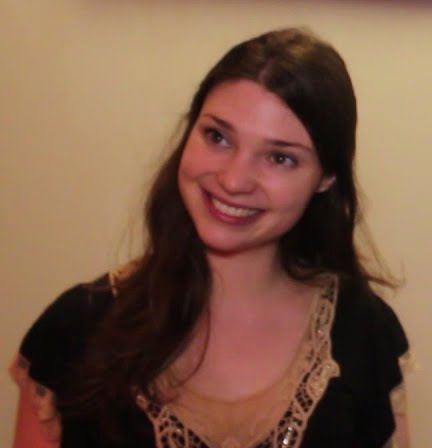
- Emerald O'Hanrahan at the Triforce SFF Awards in 2014
- Born: 1986 (age 39–40); Cambridgeshire, England
- Occupation: Actress
- Years active: 2009-present

Emerald O'Hanrahan (born 1986) is an English actress best known for playing Emma Grundy in The Archers on BBC Radio 4.

== Early life ==
She was born and raised in Cambridgeshire. Educated at St Mary's School, Cambridge, until 2002, where she took part in school and amateur productions, playing Susan in The Lion, the Witch and the Wardrobe, Juliet in a tour of Romeo and Juliet around East Anglia, and at the Cambridge Arts Theatre as Miranda in The Tempest. She studied for A Levels at the Long Road Sixth Form College, then took a BA in Acting at Bristol Old Vic Theatre School, where she won the Carleton Hobbs Bursary.

== Career ==
After graduation in July 2009, she joined the BBC's Radio Drama Company for five months, participating in more than 40 productions for BBC Radio 3, BBC Radio 4 and BBC Radio 4 Extra, bringing her to the attention of the producers of The Archers who were looking to recast the role of Emma Grundy following Felicity Jones's decision to depart.

O’Hanrahan has taken to the stage in productions such as Birmingham Repertory Company 2011 double-production of Oscar Wilde’s The Importance of Being Earnest and Tom Stoppard’s Travesties.

In 2014, she voiced Nina Taylor in Creative Assembly's survival horror game Alien: Isolation.

In 2015, she starred in Martin Delaney's short film Queen's Mile.

In 2017, she appeared in the BBC Television series Father Brown as Victoria Nicholson in episode 5.10, "The Alchemist's Secret".

In 2025, she narrated Channel 5's The Taste Test Restaurant.

== Radio ==
| Date | Title | Role | Director | Station |
|---|---|---|---|---|
| 2009 – | The Archers | Emma Grundy née Carter | | BBC Radio 4 |
| 18 September 2009 | The Milk Race | [Other parts] | Toby Swift | BBC Radio 4 Afternoon Play |
| 21 October 2009 | Those Hard to Reach Places | Phone voice | Toby Swift | BBC Radio 4 Afternoon Play |
| 18 November 2009 | The Loop | Dolores | Toby Swift | BBC Radio 4 Afternoon Play |
| 20 December 2009 – 27 December 2009 | Matilda | Miss Honey | Claire Grove | BBC Radio 4 Classic Serial |
| November 2010 | Wives and Daughters | Molly Gibson | Peter Leslie Wild | BBC Radio 4 Extra |
| 16 January 2015 | Take Me to the Necropolis | Alice | Kirsty Williams | BBC Radio 4 Afternoon Play |
