= The Recall Man =

BBC radio drama series by David Napthine

- Genre: Drama
- Running time: 45 minutes
- Country of origin: United Kingdom
- Language(s): English
- Home station: BBC Radio 4
- Starring: Jeremy Swift
- Written by: David Napthine; Steven Chambers (one episode)
- Directed by: Toby Swift
- Original release: 7 December 2001 initially as Doctor Joe Aston Investigates
- No. of series: 2
- No. of episodes: 7
- Audio format: Stereophonic sound

The Recall Man is a BBC radio drama series by David Napthine. It grew from a single Afternoon Play Doctor Joe Aston Investigates broadcast on 7 December 2001. This plus three new episodes were originally broadcast in 2003, and three more in 2005. It is a crime drama revolving around Dr. Joe Aston, a forensic psychologist who specializes in memory. A native of Middlesbrough, Aston returns to his home town for a six-month attachment to the local Police force. The series covers seven cases he investigates.

Few if any television or radio dramas have been set in Middlesbrough. Episodes of this drama contain references to local streets and landmarks, such as Parliament Road, the Newport Bridge and "Over the Border", a local reference to the oldest part of the town which, for a time, was notorious for prostitution and crime. The "Border" is generally taken to be the railway tracks which are the southern boundary of the old town, the other boundary being the River Tees. There are also references in Making Waves to the local Teesside "delicacy", the Parmesan.

Joe has several conversations with his father and friends in local pubs. The subtext to these conversations is another Middlesbrough truism, namely that the best thing a smart local lad can do is leave.

== Episodes ==
1. Doctor Joe Aston Investigates — A laboratory researcher working in a clean room is suspected of strangling her boss. She has no memory of the death. Nobody else could possibly have been in the room.
2. Making Waves — A man returns to Middlesbrough and contacts the Police to tell them he remembers witnessing an old murder. Can his memory be trusted?
3. Over the Border — A taxi driver may have witnessed a gangland murder in the crime-ridden old part of town. Even if he can remember the killer's face, will he want to?
4. Stepping Out — Joe has to deal with a rival psychologist and a series of attacks on women.

Series 2:

1. Taken by Surprise — A financial adviser is abducted and only released when his employer pays the ransom. Joe resorts to unorthodox methods to secure a positive identification of the main suspect.
2. Can't See for Looking — A witness to an arson attack thinks she saw a rhinoceros throwing a petrol bomb, and Joe tries to discover what she really saw.
3. Best Forgotten (by Steven Chambers) — Joe uncovers some information about an unsolved robbery case in 1952 implicating Joe's elderly uncle Tom and his friend.

== Cast ==
- Dr. Joe Aston - Jeremy Swift
- DC Jeff Patton - Paul Brennen
- DI Ann Reynolds - Janet Dibley
