= The Empty Child =

164a – "The Empty Child"
- Doctor Who episode

Cast
- Doctor: Christopher Eccleston – Ninth Doctor
- Companions: Billie Piper – Rose Tyler; John Barrowman – Jack Harkness
- Others: Kate Harvey – Nightclub Singer; Albert Valentine – The Child; Florence Hoath – Nancy; Cheryl Fergison – Mrs Lloyd; Damian Samuels – Mr Lloyd; Robert Hands – Algy; Joseph Tremain – Jim; Jordan Murphy – Ernie; Brandon Miller – Alf; Richard Wilson – Dr Constantine; Noah Johnson – Voice of the Empty Child; Dian Perry – Computer Voice

Production
- Directed by: James Hawes
- Written by: Steven Moffat
- Produced by: Phil Collinson
- Executive producers: Russell T Davies; Julie Gardner; Mal Young
- Music by: Murray Gold
- Production code: 1.9
- Series: Series 1
- Running time: 1st of 2-part story, 45 minutes
- First broadcast: 21 May 2005

Chronology
← Preceded by "Father's Day"	Followed by → "The Doctor Dances"

"The Empty Child" is the ninth episode of the first series of the British science fiction television programme Doctor Who, which was first broadcast on BBC One on 21 May 2005. It was directed by James Hawes, and was the first canonical episode written by Steven Moffat, who previously wrote the Comic Relief mini-episode "The Curse of Fatal Death" in 1999. He would later become the showrunner and main writer of Doctor Who from the fifth to tenth series. "The Empty Child" is the first of a two-part story, which continued and concluded with "The Doctor Dances", on 28 May.

In the episode, the alien time traveller, the Doctor and his companion Rose Tyler arrive in 1941 during the London Blitz, where they find that the city has been terrorised by a strange child in a gas mask repeatedly asking for his mother. The episode marks the first appearance of John Barrowman as Captain Jack Harkness, who would become a recurring character in Doctor Who and the lead character of the spin-off series Torchwood.

"The Empty Child" was watched by 7.11 million viewers in the UK. The two-part story has been cited by critics amongst the best of the show, and it won the 2006 Hugo Award for Best Dramatic Presentation, Short Form.

== Plot ==
The Ninth Doctor and Rose follow a time-travelling metal cylinder to London in 1941, during the Blitz. The Doctor tries to track the cylinder, while Rose discovers a strange young boy wearing a gas mask on a nearby roof. Rose climbs on a nearby rope to escape, but she realises too late that the rope is the tethering cable of a barrage balloon, and is carried off the ground. Captain Jack Harkness, a former time agent from the future posing as a Royal Air Force officer, rescues Rose with his camouflaged spaceship before Rose falls from the balloon. Jack mistakes Rose for a potential customer of an object that he is willing to sell. Rose plays along, but insists she needs to discuss the matter with her partner before buying.

Meanwhile, the Doctor returns to the TARDIS to find its phone ringing; despite caution from Nancy, a young woman nearby, not to answer it, he does, only to hear the voice of a child asking "Are you my mummy?" He follows Nancy to a house left empty from the recent air raid sirens, where Nancy and some orphaned children she cares for eat the meal abandoned by the homeowners. The Doctor tries to learn more from Nancy, but the boy in the gas mask knocks at the door. Nancy orders the children to leave by the back entrance, and warns the Doctor not to touch the boy. The Doctor opens the door anyway, but the child is gone. The Doctor catches up to Nancy and convinces her to give him more information. Nancy reveals that she knew the cylinder fell near a nearby hospital, and its appearance is tied to the boy.

The Doctor arrives at the hospital and discovers several patients with identical symptoms, including gas masks fused to their bodies. Dr Constantine explains that Jamie, Nancy's brother, was the first patient with these symptoms. Suddenly, Constantine changes into another gas mask-wearing person as Rose and Jack arrive. Jack admits that the crashed cylinder is just a worthless Chula medical transport which he sent to earth in order to con the Doctor and Rose. The converted patients suddenly rise from their beds and converge on the trio, all asking "Are you my mummy?" Nancy, who had returned to the home to get more food, is also cornered by Jamie, the boy, as he reaches out to her.

== Production ==
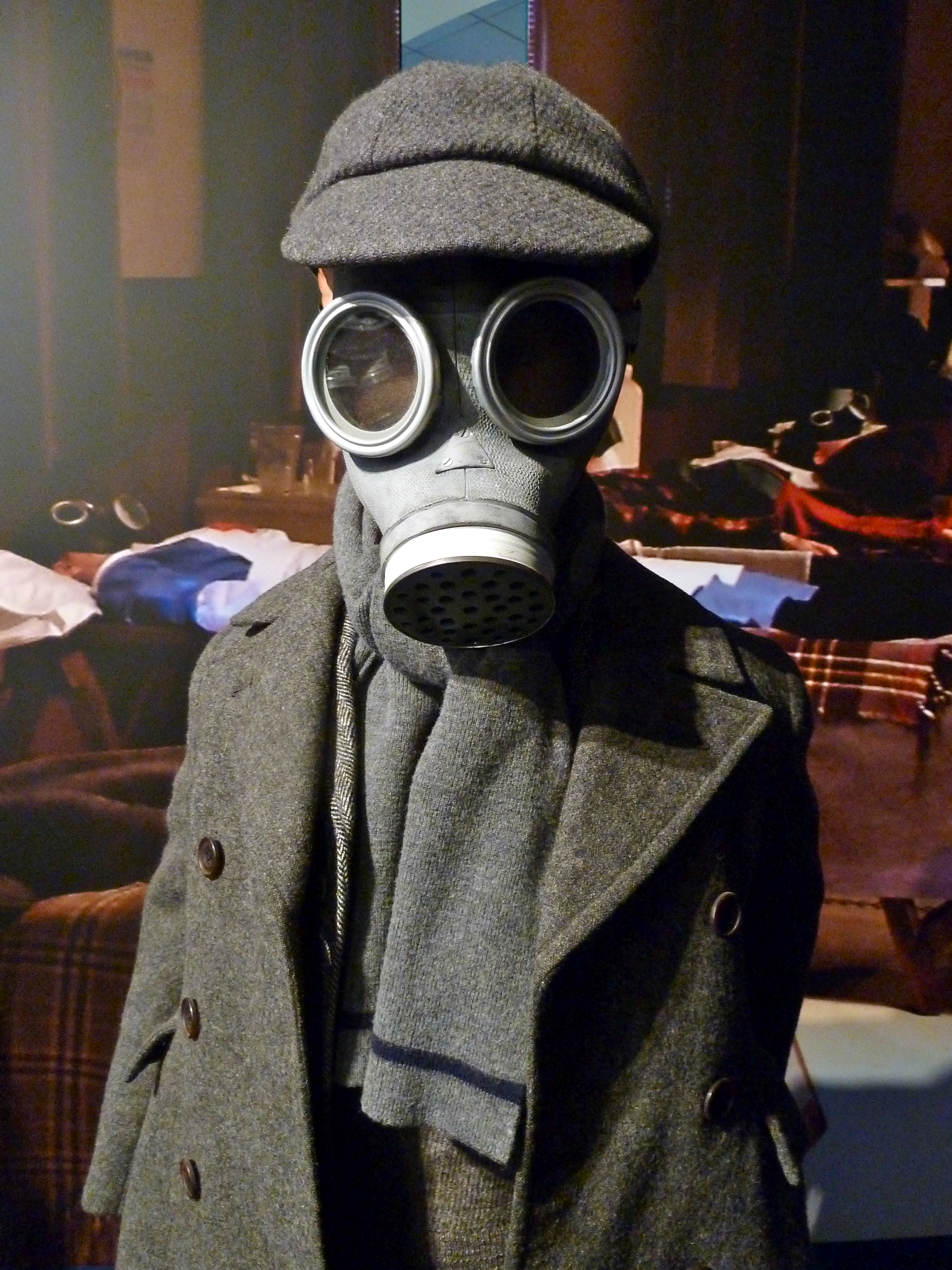
The titular Empty Child, as shown at the Doctor Who Experience.

This episode had the working title "World War II". Early versions of this script quoted this episode's title as being "An Empty Child". This is a reference to "An Unearthly Child", the very first episode of Doctor Who. The episode's television listings information and the DVD cover also mention that "London is being terrorised by an unearthly child". In Davies's initial pitch, Captain Jack was originally called 'Captain Jax', an interstellar alien soldier. The name Jax was eventually dropped, as was Jack's original characterisation, instead being a human conman from the 51st century.

The filming took place during the fourth production block. Special effects shots were completed at Unit Q2 in Newport on 17 and 18 December 2004. From 4 to 8 January and from 11 to 14 January scenes at Cardiff Royal Infirmary were filmed. On 9 and 10 January scenes shot in alleyways were filmed in Womanby Street, Cardiff. The bar scenes were also shot on 10 January at Headlands School in Penarth. The scene in which Rose hangs from the barrage balloon was filmed in a hangar at RAF St Athan and then in the Vale of Glamorgan, on 17 January. From 18 to 20 January filming involving Jack's ship and the TARDIS took place at the studio at Unit Q2. Extra TARDIS scenes were shot on 7 February. Scenes in the Lloyd's house were filmed on 28 January. Glamorgan House in Cardiff was used for the officers' club scene on 8 February. Location filming also took place at the Barry Tourist Railway. Barry Island and its now-demolished Butlins holiday camp had previously been the filming location of the Seventh Doctor serial, Delta and the Bannermen.

The sound of Dr Constantine's skull cracking as his face changes into a gas mask was considered too horrific in its full form by the production team and was cut before broadcast. However, writer Steven Moffat claims on the DVD commentary to this episode that the sound was discussed but never put on. According to the Doctor Who Confidential episode "Fear Factor", the effect was added in the version of the episode presented on The Complete First Series box set. Casting for Captain Jack Harkness began around June with particular consideration to John Barrowman per the request of executive producer Julie Gardener.

Unlike previous episodes, the "next episode" trailers were shown after the end credits instead of immediately preceding them, possibly in reaction to comments after "Aliens of London" about having the cliffhanger for that episode spoiled.

Writer Steven Moffat says in the DVD commentary for this episode that the Doctor's reply to Rose asking him what she should call him ("Doctor who?") was originally going to be, "I'd rather have Doctor Who than Star Trek," a metafictional dig at the latter programme. This is the first televised Doctor Who story to make a direct reference to Star Trek. The Chula ships are named after Chula, an Indian/Bangladeshi fusion restaurant in Hammersmith, London where the writers celebrated and discussed their briefs on the scripts they were to write for the season after being commissioned by Russell T Davies. This meeting was videotaped, and is available on the DVD release of Doctor Who — The Complete First Series.

The episode was initially smaller in scale and personal with writer Steven Moffat saying that "there was no big enemy and the major fear factor was a little boy looking for his mummy. Doctor Who can be small and domestic, and brilliantly effective."

== Broadcast and reception ==
"The Empty Child" received overnight ratings of 6.6 million viewers, a 34.9% audience share. When final ratings were calculated, the figure rose to 7.11 million viewers. The episode received an Audience Appreciation Index score of 84.

SFX stated that the two-part story had "everything", particularly praising Moffat's script. In 2012, Dave Golder of the magazine labelled "The Empty Child" as a good example of the science fiction "Creepy Kid Episode". Dek Hogan of Digital Spy disliked Barrowman as Captain Jack, but called it a "particularly creepy episode of the series" despite Jack and "the brevity of Richard Wilson's neat and spooky little cameo". He later called "The Empty Child" and "The Doctor Dances" the best episodes of the series. Now Playing magazine reviewer Arnold T. Blumburg gave the episode a grade of a B, describing it as "solid" with elements of the original series, though he noted a lot was thrown at the audience and he was not impressed with Barrowman's Jack yet.

In a poll conducted by Doctor Who Magazine in 2009, the two-part story was ranked the fifth best episode of Doctor Who. In a similar poll conducted in 2014, readers ranked the two-part story the seventh best Doctor Who story of all time. The Daily Telegraph named the story the fourth best of the show in 2008. In 2011 before the second half of the sixth series, The Huffington Post labelled "The Empty Child" and "The Doctor Dances" as one of five essential episodes for new viewers to watch. In 2013 Doctor Who TV rated The Empty Child as the twentieth scariest villain.

"The Empty Child", along with its conclusion "The Doctor Dances", won the 2006 Hugo Award for Best Dramatic Presentation (Short Form).
