= Philip Palmer =

British novelist and screenwriter (born 1960)

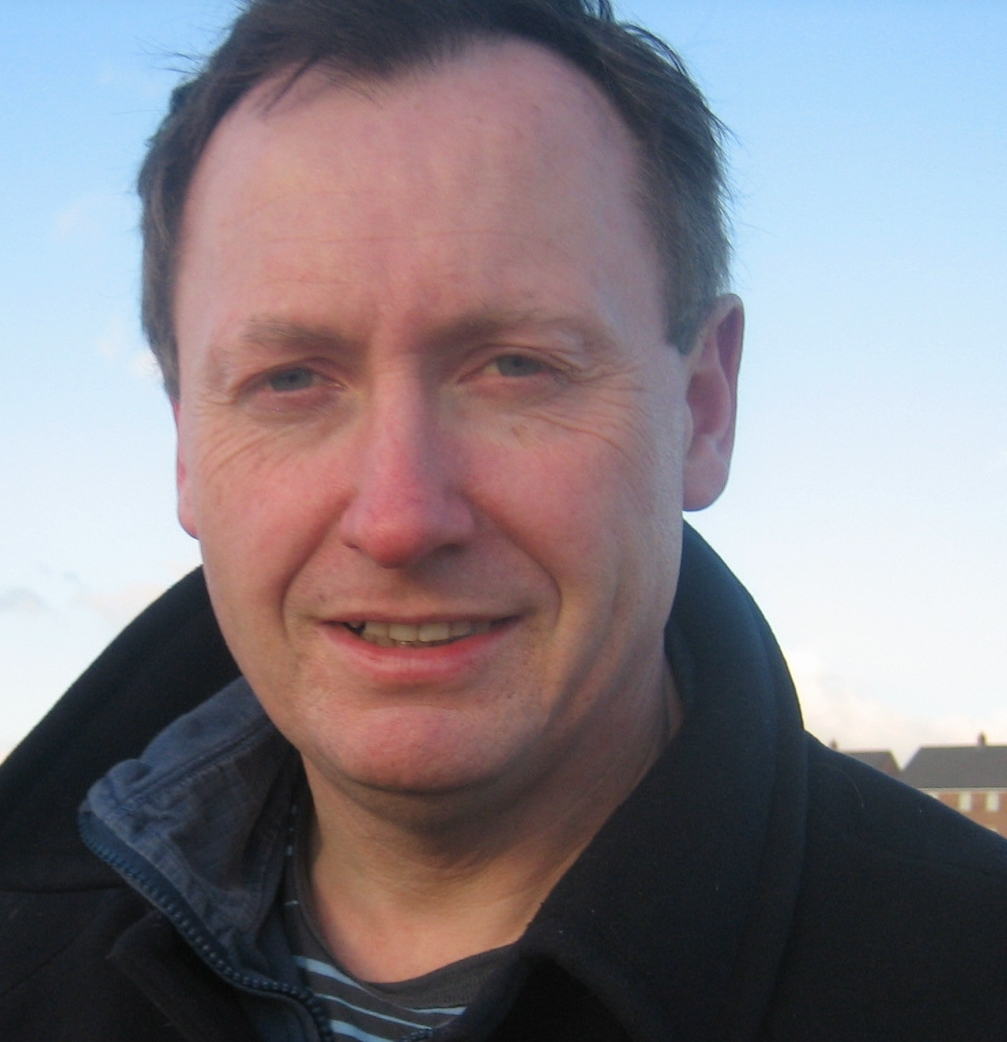
- Philip Palmer in 2005
- Born: 7 June 1960 (age 66); Port Talbot, Wales, United Kingdom
- Occupation: Author
- Writing career
- Genre: Science fiction
- Website: www.philippalmer.net

Philip Palmer is a British novelist and screenwriter. Originally from Port Talbot, Wales, he studied English at Jesus College, Oxford, matriculating in 1978.

== Writing career ==
His first novel was Debatable Space, published in January 2008 by Orbit Books in the United Kingdom and the United States. Philip Palmer describes himself as "...a glamorous hyphenate. Writer-writer-toolazytogetaproperjob-writer."

== Works ==
=== Radio Plays ===
For BBC Radio 4:

- Gin and Rum, about ghosts, 30 June 2000
- Fallen, 23 January 2001
- The Faerie Queene, a very free version of Spenser’s epic poem, in the outlet's Classic Serial, 30 September 2001 – 7 October 2001
- The King’s Coiner, about the older-age anti-counterfeiter Isaac Newton, amid the cut-throat nature of serious fraud at the time, 23 April 2002
- The Travels of Marco Polo, 18 February 2004
- Rubato, about music, 11 February 2005
- Blame, about industrial manslaughter, 12 August 2005
- Breaking Point, Day of the Dead, 10 August 2007
- The Art Of Deception, 22–26 June 2009
- The Art of Deception, Day of the Dead (series 2), 20–24 December 2010
- Bearing Witness, legal drama inside the International Criminal Tribunal for the former Yugoslavia in The Hague, 12 December 2012
- Speak, amid dystopian "Globish", a 1500-word version of English, a dangerous romance makes a case for how words – and even more, their paucity – can control, confine, leach emotion and trap minds, 18 June 2018

=== Novels ===
- Debatable Space (2008)
- Red Claw (2009)
- Version 43 (2010)
- Hell Ship (2011)
- Artemis (2011)
- Hell on Earth (2017)
