= The Doctor Dances =

164b – "The Doctor Dances"
- Doctor Who episode

Cast
- Doctor: Christopher Eccleston – Ninth Doctor
- Companions: Billie Piper – Rose Tyler; John Barrowman – Jack Harkness
- Others: Richard Wilson – Dr Constantine; Florence Hoath – Nancy; Luke Perry – Timothy Lloyd; Albert Valentine – Jamie (The Child); Cheryl Fergison – Mrs Lloyd; Damian Samuels – Mr Lloyd; Robert Hands – Algy; Joseph Tremain – Jim; Jordan Murphy – Ernie; Martin Hodgson – Jenkins; Vilma Hollingbery – Mrs Harcourt; Noah Johnson – Voice of the Empty Child; Dian Perry – Computer voice

Production
- Directed by: James Hawes
- Written by: Steven Moffat
- Script editor: Elwen Rowlands
- Produced by: Phil Collinson
- Executive producers: Russell T Davies; Julie Gardner; Mal Young
- Music by: Murray Gold
- Production code: 1.10
- Series: Series 1
- Running time: 2nd of 2-part story, 45 minutes
- First broadcast: 28 May 2005

Chronology
← Preceded by "The Empty Child"	Followed by → "Boom Town"

"The Doctor Dances" is the tenth episode of the first series of the revival of the British science fiction television programme Doctor Who, which was first broadcast on BBC One on 28 May 2005. It is the second of a two-part story, following the broadcast of "The Empty Child" on 21 May.

The episode is set in London in 1941. In the episode, the Ninth Doctor, his companion Rose Tyler, con man Captain Jack Harkness, and homeless woman Nancy investigate a spaceship that crashed the same time as patients at a nearby hospital began turning into undead beings with gas masks for faces. The episode saw Jack join the Doctor as a companion.

The episode was well praised by critics, just like its first part, with the ending particularly praised. The two-parter was also praised as the best in the series. Together with "The Empty Child", it won the 2006 Hugo Award for Best Dramatic Presentation, Short Form.

== Plot ==
The Ninth Doctor, Rose, and Jack are cornered in a London hospital during the Blitz by patients wearing gas masks fused to their faces asking for their "mummy". The Doctor, pretending to reprimand them for bad behaviour, tells them "Go to your room!", after which the patients return to their beds. Jamie, the index case of the "epidemic", also responds to this, leaving Nancy alone. The Doctor, Rose, and Jack investigate the hospital room Jamie was treated at, and learn from recordings that the child is growing stronger, and its powers may become unstoppable. Jamie arrives shortly thereafter, having returned to "his room", along with other patients. Jack teleports himself, the Doctor and Rose to Jack's spaceship. The Doctor uses the ship's Chula nanogenes to heal his wounds while learning more about Jack's past.

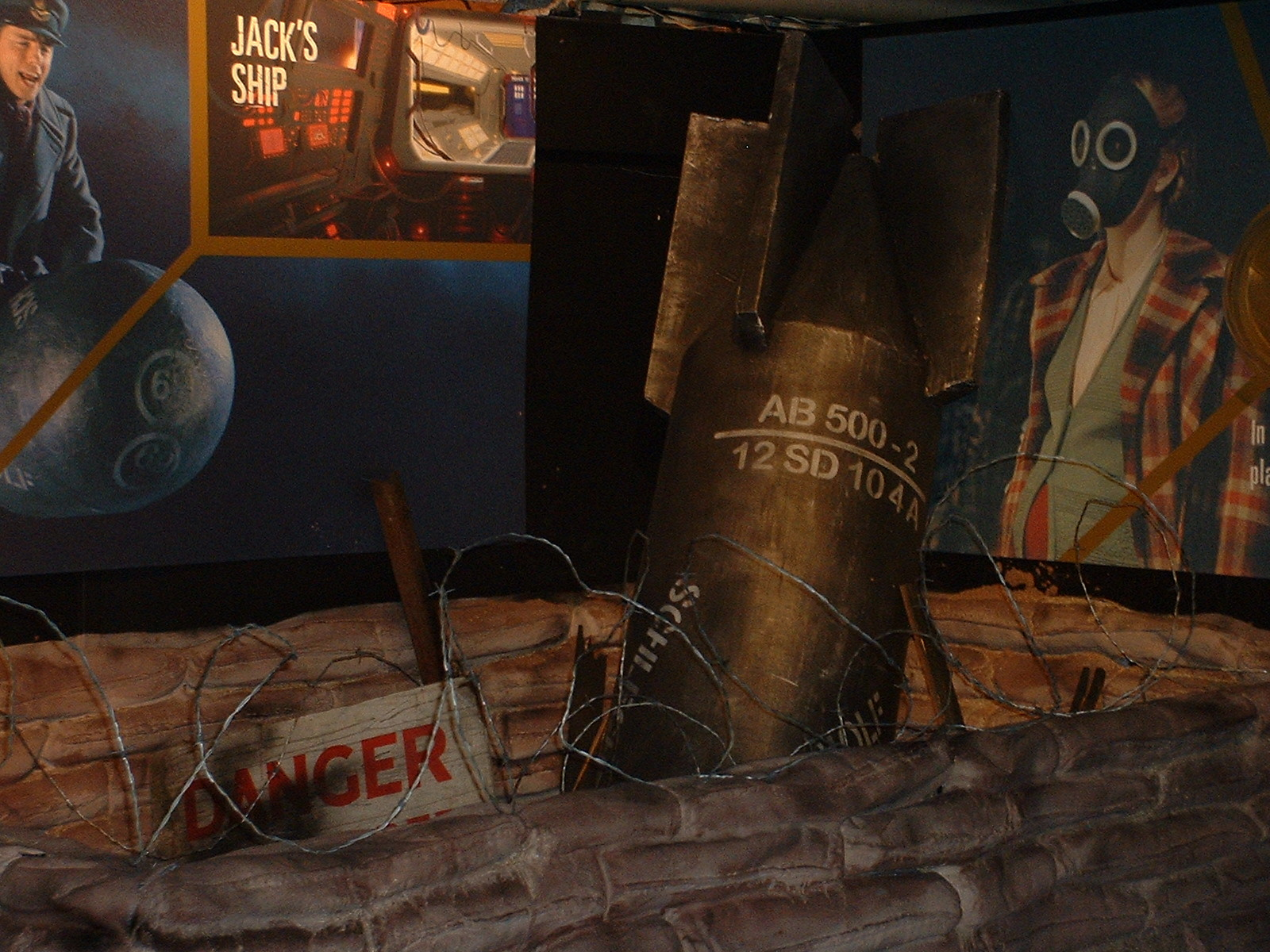
The bomb prop, on display at a Doctor Who exhibition

Nancy returns to the site where the cylinder crashed near the hospital on the night Jamie had gained his powers, only to be captured by soldiers. The Doctor, Rose, and Jack return to the site, and discover the guards' faces transforming into gas mask-wearing people, as the contagion becomes airborne. Examining the cylinder, the remains of a Chula medical ship, the Doctor deduces what has happened: as with Jack's ship, the Chula medical ship carried nanogenes. They had scanned the first human they encountered, Jamie, who died that night whilst wearing a gas mask, and presumed it was a template for all humans, transforming them into the gas mask-wearing people.

Meanwhile, the transformed humans approach the cylinder. The Doctor realises that Jamie is the template controlling all these humans, searching for his "mummy", and that Nancy is not Jamie's sister, but his mother. The Doctor convinces Nancy to tell Jamie she is Jamie's mother. Nancy accepts Jamie into her arms; the nanogenes determine that Nancy is Jamie's parent and that her DNA is the proper template for humans. The Doctor directs the nanogenes to undo their previous transformations, and restores Jamie to life.

A German bomb approaches the site. Jack returns to his ship and uses it to tether the bomb and steer it away from Earth. The Doctor orders everyone to flee the area, and destroys the medical ship as history recorded. Jack is unable to stop the bomb or escape from it, but the Doctor comes to rescue Jack, who joins the Doctor and Rose in the TARDIS. Rose dances with the Doctor whilst Jack watches.

== Production ==
=== Writing ===
The two-parter was originally outlined by Russell T Davies as "World War II" and "Captain Jax". The story was allocated to Steven Moffat, an award-winning writer, who had written a short story and a spoof for Doctor Who before. Moffat celebrated this with the other writers who had also been allocated episodes in Chula, an Indian/Bangladeshi fusion restaurant in Hammersmith. Moffat named the Chula ships seen in the episodes after it. A tone meeting was held for the episode in Cardiff, with Davies stating that the key word was "romantic". As a result, the episode depicted a nostalgic instead of a realistic view for World War II.

In the DVD commentary for this episode, writer Steven Moffat reveals that up until a very late stage, the nanogenes in this story were called "nanites". However, script editor Helen Raynor decided this name sounded too much like similar nanotechnological devices in Star Trek: The Next Generation. Moffat had first used the line "Life is just nature's way of keeping meat fresh" in the second series of his 1990s sitcom Joking Apart. He reused it here as he thought it was a good line, but laments that people quote other lines from this episode instead of that one.

Anachronistically, Jamie's voice is recorded on tape. While compact magnetic tape recorders were developed in Germany in the 1930s, the technology did not make its way to the rest of the world until after World War II. Wire recording was used by the BBC during this period, but recording gramophones, using wax discs as a medium, were more common. Steven Moffat acknowledges this mistake in the DVD commentary, but jokingly suggested that an ancestor of Brigadier Lethbridge-Stewart stole the machine from Germany to help with the war effort.

=== Casting and filming ===
Casting began early for the role of Captain Jack, getting underway in June. John Barrowman, a Scottish-American actor, was the only one considered for the role, as Julie Gardener was impressed by his performance in a West End musical.

The climactic scene of the episode at the alien crash site was filmed on Barry Island, Wales. Several scenes of this story were filmed at the Vale of Glamorgan Railway sites at Plymouth Road on Barry Island.

== Broadcast and reception ==
=== Broadcast ===
"The Doctor Dances" was broadcast on BBC1 on 28 May, at its usual slot of 7pm, unlike the previous episode. A corresponding behind-the-scenes episode of "Doctor Who Confidential" was broadcast afterwards on BBC3 under the title "Weird Science". It was repeated twice on BBC3 during the week, once at midnight, and again at 7pm on the following day.

=== Ratings ===
"The Doctor Dances" received overnight ratings of 6.17 million viewers, a 35.9% audience share; this was the lowest figure yet for the series, but it was during a bank holiday weekend and was the most-watched programme on Saturday. It received a final rating of 6.86 million viewers. The episode received an Audience Appreciation Index score of 85.

=== Reception ===
SFX stated that the two-part story had "everything", particularly praising Moffat's script. They highlighted the ending of "The Doctor Dances" as "funny, surprising, heartwarming and life-affirming without slipping into syrupy schmaltz". Dek Hogan of Digital Spy disliked Barrowman as Captain Jack, but named the two-part story as the best episodes of the series. Arnold T Blumburg of Now Playing gave "The Doctor Dances" a grade of A, writing that it "may be the production and plotting high point of the first series to date". He said that the episode "manages to smoothly present a ton of technobabble with clarity and precision" and praised the dialogue and the "exhilarating" climax.

The scene where the child surprises the Doctor, Rose, and Jack in Room 802 was voted television's "Golden Moment of 2005" by viewers, as part of the BBC's 2005 TV Moments programme. In a poll conducted by Doctor Who Magazine in 2009, the two-part story was ranked the fifth best episode of Doctor Who. The Daily Telegraph named the story the fourth best of the show in 2008. In 2011 before the second half of the sixth series, The Huffington Post labelled "The Empty Child" and "The Doctor Dances" as one of the five essential episodes for new viewers to watch.

"The Empty Child" and "The Doctor Dances" won the 2006 Hugo Award for Best Dramatic Presentation (Short Form).
