= Joanna Monro =

British actress (born 1956)

Joanna Munro
- Born: Joanna Hale Monro; 26 July 1956 (age 70); Marylebone, London, England
- Occupations: Actress; presenter

Joanna Monro (born 26 July 1956) is a British actress and former television presenter. In the 1980s, she was notable for appearing on the BBC television show That's Life! with Esther Rantzen.

== Early life ==
Hale's father was actor Sonnie Hale (whose real name was Robert John Hugh Monro); she was born as a result of his affair with her mother, actress Frances Bennett (real name Felicité Barnes). Following Hale's death in 1959, when she was only three years old, Monro was brought up by her stepfather, theatrical agent John McMichael and considered him to be her real father.

== Career ==
Fascinated by her mother's acting career, Hale was desperate to follow in her footsteps. At nine years old, she got a part in Brown Eye, Evil Eye. Bennett was against her daughter appearing in the film, but was pressured by the agent and her daughter's pleading, eventually giving in. Monro went over to Yugoslavia during the summer holidays for filming, and afterwards wanted to continue acting, but was forbidden by her mother until she was 16, so as to concentrate on her schoolwork. However, at 15, Bennett allowed Monro to do television work during the school holidays, in order to secure her union card with Equity.

Leaving school at 17, Hale went for an audition at Birmingham Repertory Theatre, only to be told that she was not properly trained, and was advised to go to drama school. As a result, she entered the London Academy of Music and Dramatic Art, but left a few months early after being seen in an end-of-term play by the producer of Vienna's English Theatre, who was recruiting in Britain. He gave Monro a part in his production of Simon Gray's play Butley, which was followed by roles on television.

In 1974, Hale appeared in the Doctor Who story Planet of the Spiders, followed by a lengthy spell as Anna Newcross in the BBC soap opera Angels. For three years in the mid-1980s she was a regular in the BBC children's sketch show Fast Forward, and was a member of the BBC's Radio Drama Company.

In the 1990s, she played Mrs Lyons in the musical Blood Brothers in the West End, and was on the 1995 London cast recording, as well as The International Recording. She also appeared in the episode "The Photographer" (1999) in the first BBC series of People Like Us (which aired from 1999 to 2001).

Monro appeared as Rosie in the musical Mamma Mia!. She was in the international tour for two years, then joined the London cast for a period of five years at the Prince of Wales Theatre, and subsequently at the Novello Theatre. She appeared in character on 31 December 2008 in a West End special edition episode of The Weakest Link on BBC One. She was the 'strongest link', winning over £14,000, which she donated to breast cancer research.

In 2017, Monro played the part of June in Sandi Toksvig's play Silver Lining, which toured the UK.

== Personal life ==
In 1978, Monro became engaged to actor Andy Secombe. However, the following year, they called their wedding off, feeling they had rushed into it without proper consideration, but remained friends. The wounds were healed while working in fringe theatre at London theatre restaurant La Bonne Crepe, where she met producer Peter Wise, marrying him in 1982. Subsequent marriages were to Peter Matthews in 1989 and actor Granville Saxton in 2001.

== Radio ==
Date	Title	Role	Director	Station
15 June 1998	Stations of the Cross		Ned Chaillet	BBC Radio 4 Afternoon Play
17 March 2003	The Case of the Perfect Carer		Jeremy Mortimer	BBC Radio 4
10 April 2010	The Believers		Toby Swift	BBC Radio 4 Saturday Play
30 April 2010	The Weighing Room	Steward	Toby Swift	BBC Radio 4 Afternoon Play
15 March 2011	Small Acts of Kindness	Annie	Toby Swift	BBC Radio 4 Afternoon Play
3 May 2011	Lost Property: The Wrong Label	Mrs Jones	Jessica Dromgoole	BBC Radio 4 Afternoon Play
17 May 2011	Lost Property: A Telegram from the Queen	Ella May	Jessica Dromgoole	BBC Radio 4 Afternoon Play
