= Red Claw =

Red Claw may refer to:

- Australian red claw crayfish
- Red Claw (novel), a 2009 science fiction novel by Philip Palmer
- "Red Claw", a 2014 dubstep song from Aleksander Vinter's album Orakel
- Red Claw, a fictional character in The Land Before Time series
- Red Claw, a fictional character in Batman: The Animated Series
- Red Claw, a fictional organization in Arthur
- Maine Red Claws, an NBA D-League basketball team affiliated to the NBA Boston Celtics
