= Trueman and Riley =

British radio drama series

- Genre: Drama
- Running time: 45 minutes (Radio 4 plays); 30 minutes (Radio 7 series)
- Country of origin: United Kingdom
- Language: English
- Home station: BBC Radio 4 BBC Radio 7
- Starring: Robert Daws; Duncan Preston
- Written by: Brian B. Thompson
- Directed by: Toby Swift
- Original release: 17 April 2002 – March 2012
- No. of series: 3
- No. of episodes: 13 (Radio 4 Plays: 4, Series 1: 4, Series 2: 5)
- Audio format: Stereophonic sound
- Opening theme: I Have Seen by Zero 7

Trueman and Riley is a British radio drama series written by Brian B. Thompson and produced by Toby Swift. It stars Robert Daws and Duncan Preston as a pair of ill-matched, middle-aged, marginalised Leeds detectives who are consigned to work on cases deemed too trivial for their more high-powered colleagues.

Originally titled Trueman, it began life as a BBC Radio 4 Afternoon Play on 17 April 2002 with Detective Inspector Trueman being called back to work after a nervous breakdown in order to solve a high profile murder case, backed up by Detective Sgt. Riley. That play was repeated, followed by three new plays in July 2005.

Renamed Trueman and Riley for a relaunch on BBC7 (now BBC Radio 4 Extra) in March 2007, and relocated from Hull to Leeds, the new series saw the pair attempt to solve slightly more everyday crimes, and frequently disagreeing about the best way to proceed. The two men both complement and irritate each other, but each recognizes that he depends on the other. Trueman seems to have no family or friends, while Riley has grandchildren. At the end of series 3 Trueman begins a relationship with the widow of a man whose death he investigated as a cold case.

The most recent series was broadcast in 2012 on BBC Radio 4 Extra. It was selected as BBC Drama Download of the Week and also featured on the Danny Baker Show (BBC Radio 5 Live), where Riley was heard discussing the merits of red or brown sauce during the Sausage Sandwich Game.

== Cast ==
- DI Trueman - Robert Daws
- DS Riley - Duncan Preston

== Episode list ==
=== Radio 4 Afternoon Plays (Trueman and Riley: The Early Years) ===
1. Trueman — Was the murder of a student a drug wars killing, or are more sinister forces at work?
2. Angel Heights — A young stable jockey has been killed by a horse in what appears to have been an accident.
3. The Road to Hull — Trueman and Riley are unhappy at the opening of Club Paradiso, a new lap dancing club in Hull.
4. High Windows — A film crew are in Hull, making a bio-pic of Philip Larkin, but they are being plagued by pranks and petty thefts.

=== Series 1 ===
1. Vanished - A husband is reported missing, but the wife is not who she claims to be.
2. Story - A reporter for an online news service falls from a building. Or was she pushed?
3. Bond - An item of James Bond movie memorabilia is stolen at a fan convention. As usual nobody is who they seem.
4. Speed - Riley gets a speeding ticket and is obliged to attend a "speed awareness" class, where he spots an ex-con who he thinks is back on his old games.

=== Series 2 ===
For the first two episodes of Series 2 in March 2009, Trueman and Riley are exiled to "Student Crime Prevention" at the University. The reason for their exile is not explained.

1. The Road to Nowhere - Student houses along one street are being burgled, but there is a connection to a trip to exotic places.
2. The Three Degrees - Three former students re-unite in their old digs, but one has to be fished out of a canal. He claims he fell in, but the CCTV says otherwise.
3. A Man's World - Items are being stolen from mothers on a maternity ward. Suspicion is cast on a man working in a woman's profession - midwifery.
4. The Other Chic - Arson and theft in the lingerie industry.
5. Love Bytes - A woman is missing, and online role-playing games are involved.

=== Series 3 ===
1. Every dog has his day - A "murder", but the victim is a dog.
2. Angel Delight - A robbery at a burlesque club.
3. Family Business - A man goes missing after winning "98 grand" from a bookmaker.
4. Green Machine - An environmental activist is knocked off his bicycle.
5. Home Truths - Trueman investigates an "accidental" death from 14 years ago. Riley gets into social media as a 14-year-old to "safeguard" his granddaughter.
