= Revelations (1994 TV series) =

- Genre: Soap opera
- Created by: Russell T Davies; Brian B. Thompson; Tony Wood
- Starring: Judy Loe; Emma Roberts; Paul Shelley
- Country of origin: United Kingdom
- Original language: English
- No. of seasons: 2
- No. of episodes: 37

Production
- Production company: Granada

Original release
- Network: ITV
- Release: 6 October 1994 – 12 September 1996

Revelations is a late-night soap opera created by Russell T Davies, Brian B. Thompson, and Tony Wood, produced by Granada and starring Judy Loe and Paul Shelley. It aired in the Granada, Central and Carlton ITV regions between 6 October 1994 and 12 September 1996. The series is family drama about the family of the priest Edward Rattigan (Shelley) and his wife Jessica (Loe). It follows and critiques the organisational structure of the Anglican Church at the turn of the millennium.

In one episode, a female vicar, Joan (Sue Holderness), comes out as a lesbian in a two-hander with Mary Beckett (Carole Nimmons). It was the first openly gay character written by Davies, who would later go on to create and produce the gay-centric series Queer as Folk, Bob & Rose, Torchwood and Cucumber. Davies attributes the storyline to the "pressure-cooker nature" of the series leading to larger storylines, and the recent ordination of female vicars in the Church of England; Davies recalls that "when they introduced women to the church, I was thinking 'Yes! We can do a lesbian vicar!'". He also revealed that a wedding storyline resulted in the groom falling in love with his best man, another landmark moment in TV.
