= Red Claw (novel) =

2009 novel by Philip Palmer

- First edition
- Author: Philip Palmer
- Language: English
- Genre: Science fiction, Space opera
- Publisher: Orbit Books
- Publication date: 01/10/2009
- Publication place: UK and US
- Media type: Print (Paperback)
- Pages: 496
- ISBN: 9781841496245
- Preceded by: Debatable Space
- Followed by: Version 43

Red Claw is a 2009 science fiction novel by British writer Philip Palmer.

== Plot ==
The plot follows Professor Richard Helms as he heads a team of scientists and soldiers sent to study and document all forms of life on the planet New Amazon. When this is done they will "terraform" the planet - destroy all life and make it fit for human habitation. The team comes under attack and Helms and his followers are forced to flee into the depths of the jungle, where they soon end up fighting for their lives.

== Literary significance and reception ==
The novel received mixed reviews. The Guardian reviewer wrote that "Palmer follows his much-praised debut, Debatable Space, with another riotous, wildly inventive space opera …crawling with over-the-top monsters and crazy biological dangers… Red Claw is that rare treat, an intelligent action adventure replete with intellectual rigour, human insight and superb storytelling."

A review in The Telegraph concluded that "This would make an ideal plot for a shoot ’em up computer game, but as literature it falls short."
