= St Mary's School, Cambridge =

Location
- 6 Chaucer Road (Junior Sch); Bateman St (Senior Sch); Brookside (Sixth); Cambridge, CB2 1LY; England; 52.195225°N 0.126891°E

Information
- Type: Private day and boarding school
- Religious affiliation: Catholic
- Established: 1898
- Local authority: Cambridgeshire
- Department for Education URN: 110912 Tables
- Head: Hannah Helliar
- Gender: Girls
- Age: 3 to 18
- Enrolment: c. 600 (2024)
- Alumnae: Pastonians Association
- Website: http://www.stmaryscambridge.co.uk/

St Mary's School, Cambridge, England, is a private school run in the Catholic tradition, offering day and boarding provision for girls aged three to eighteen. The school occupies three sites within walking distance of each other, and Cambridge city centre, close to the University Botanic Gardens, with sports facilities a short distance away on Long Road and a Boathouse for rowing on the River Cam.

== History ==
St Mary's School, Cambridge, was founded 1898 by the Sisters of Mary Ward and the Institute of the Blessed Virgin Mary, who had also founded a school of the same name in Ascot, Berkshire 13 years earlier. The sisters started out with two day girls and two day boarders. In 1904 the swelling numbers necessitated a change of venue and 'The Elms' on Bateman Street was purchased for £6,000. The house had a tradition that was very much in keeping with Mary Ward's vision. It had previously belonged to Benjamin Hall Kennedy, former Regius Professor of Greek at Cambridge University. As the school continued to grow, other premises were added. Paston House was purchased in 1909.

The Junior School was part of St Mary's School, Cambridge, until it closed in 1987, when it reopened as St Catherine's Prep School and was governed by a group of parents who became the board of directors. In 2007 St Catherine's became St Mary's School, Cambridge's junior section. Both schools are governed by a single board.

== Boarding ==
The school offers a full, weekly or flexi boarding programme for years 5 to upper sixth (ages 9 to 18). Approximately 20% of senior school pupils board. In 2016 the school purchased a new dedicated boarding house on Brooklands Avenue, Mary Ward House, to replace the two buildings previously used: Bateman House for sixth formers and 'The Elms' for girls from years 7–11.

== Alumnae ==
Former pupils are known as Pastonians, named after Paston House.

- Emerald O'Hanrahan, actress
- Maisie Ward, writer and publisher
