= A Perfect Hero =

- Genre: Drama
- Written by: Christopher Matthew; Allan Prior
- Directed by: James Cellan Jones
- Starring: Nigel Havers; James Fox; Fiona Gillies; Barbara Leigh-Hunt; Nicholas Pritchard; Amanda Elwes; Patrick Ryecart; Bernard Hepton; Joanna Lumley
- Composer: Richard Holmes
- Country of origin: United Kingdom
- Original language: English
- No. of series: 1
- No. of episodes: 6

Production
- Executive producers: Nick Elliott; Michael Whitehall
- Producer: James Cellan Jones
- Production companies: Havahall Pictures; LWT

Original release
- Network: ITV
- Release: 17 May – 21 June 1991

A Perfect Hero is a 1991 TV drama serial set in World War II England. It was produced by Havahall Pictures in association with LWT for ITV and first broadcast at 9:00pm on Friday, 17 May 1991, running for six episodes. It was broadcast in the US as part of Masterpiece Theatre during Season 21 that ran from 1991 to 1992.

== Plot summary ==
The miniseries is about a young RAF Fighter Pilot Flying Officer Hugh Fleming DFC, played by Nigel Havers, who is shot down during the Battle of Britain and is severely burned around the face and hands. While recovering and experiencing life as a scarred casualty of war, his colleagues and friends who had joined the RAF with him die one by one.

This series shows how burn victims are treated and how they have to recuperate. It is hard for Fleming because he was an extremely handsome young man who had no problem dating women. With his face deformed by the burns and the plastic surgery, his life becomes a rather more traumatic one.

Some aspects of the story are reminiscent of the life of Richard Hillary, as recounted in his 1943 book, "The Last Enemy."

== Music ==
Episode end credits play the song The Bells of Hell Go Ting-a-ling-a-ling, which somewhat lightens the mood.
