= Spike Island (film) =

- Spike Island film poster
- Directed by: Mat Whitecross
- Written by: Chris Coghill
- Produced by: Esther Douglas; Fiona Neilson
- Starring: Elliott Tittensor; Emilia Clarke; Lesley Manville
- Cinematography: Christopher Ross
- Edited by: Peter Christelis
- Music by: Ilan Eshkeri; Tim Wheeler
- Production companies: Bankside Films; BBC Films; Fiesta Productions; Head Gear Films; Metrol Technology; Revolver Entertainment
- Distributed by: Vertigo Films; Universal Pictures
- Release dates: 11 October 2012 (BFI London Film Festival); 21 June 2013 (United Kingdom)
- Running time: 105 minutes
- Country: United Kingdom
- Language: English
- Box office: £157,036

Spike Island is a 2012 British comedy film directed by Mat Whitecross and written by Chris Coghill. It was distributed by Universal Pictures and Vertigo Films and produced by Revolver Entertainment. The film is based on the Stone Roses' seminal gig on Spike Island in Widnes, Cheshire, England, and follows the story of a group of friends who idolise the band and try to get into the gig, but are faced with problems because they don't have tickets or a way to get there. Spike Island premiered on 11 October 2012 at the BFI London Film Festival and was released on DVD on 21 June 2013.

== Plot ==
Set in May 1990, the film follows the exploits of five lads: Gary 'Tits' Titchfield, Darren 'Dodge' Hodge, Chris 'Zippy' Weeks, 'Little Gaz' Gareth Barrett and 'Penfold' Andrew Peach. They are fans of the Stone Roses and members of wannabe band Shadowcaster. It starts 60 hours prior to the Stone Roses' legendary gig at Spike Island, Widnes, Cheshire. The group get an idea to give the Stone Roses their cassette tape via Sally, a girl whom both Tits and Dodge show interest in, although Dodge has never spoken to her. They hatch a plan to get tickets to the gig and kick-start their career. Tits' brother 'Ibiza' Steve gets the boys on the guest-list for the gig. But when Tits' dad becomes increasingly ill during the 60 hours, he fails to turn up and on the morning of the gig his dad worsens but his dad tells Tits to go to the gig. Penfold's dad burns his top in an effort to stop him from going and when he goes to hit him Penfold stands up to his dad after his dad has been abusing him and heads to the gig. They lure 'Uncle Hairy' out of his van and steal it but when they run out of fuel they have to stop but Penfold convinces them to walk to the M6. They hide in the baggage hold of the bus until they arrive at Spike Island. Once arrived they jump out of their hiding place and are chased by police and the bus driver but lose them in the crowd. They lose Penfold and are unable to find him, so they carry on to the entry zone but are turned away because they do not have tickets and are not on the guest-list. The remaining four make their way to the outside of the venue. They meet Sally who has lost her friends in the crowd and doesn't want to go in alone and gives Dodge her ticket. Dodge heads for the gig without the cassette tape because he was afraid "to fuck it up". On his way back to the boys, he sees Sally and Tits hooking up. Tits and Dodge later argue but when Tits' dad eventually dies they make up. At the end of the movie it is shown that Tits and Sally are together and all the boys have moved on as school has finished. The ending scene shows Tits looking at Dodge from his window while Dodge walks down the lane with his guitar and bags.

== Cast ==
- Elliott Tittensor as Gary Tits Titchfield
- Emilia Clarke as Sally "Cinnamon" Harris
- Lesley Manville as Margaret Titchfield
- Nico Mirallegro as Dodge
- Jordan Murphy as Zippy
- Adam Long as Little Gaz
- Oliver Heald as Penfold
- Chris Coghill as Uncle Hairy
- Matthew McNulty as Ibiza Steve Titchfield
- Nick Blood as Dave Famous
- Michael Socha as Carl
- Antonia Thomas as Lisa
- Jodie Whittaker as Suzanne
- Paul Popplewell as 'Roses Manager
- Andrew Knott as Voodoo Ray
- Rob James-Collier as Mr Milligan
- Philip Jackson as Mr Jackson
- Steve Evets as Eric Titchfield

== Reception ==
=== Critical response ===
On Rotten Tomatoes, the film has a rating of 43% based on 28 reviews; the average rating is 4.9/10. The 'Critics Consensus' on its Rotten Tomatoes page says: "Spike Island has energy and visual style to spare; unfortunately, they're lost within the movie's clichéd story and choppy direction."

=== Awards ===
- Elliot Tittensor was nominated for Most Promising Newcomer for the 2012 British Independent Film Awards.
