= Carl Prekopp =

English actor (born 1979)

- Born: Carl James Prekopp; 25 May 1979 (age 47); Sheffield, Yorkshire, England
- Occupations: Actor, voice actor, singer-songwriter
- Years active: 2002–present
- Website: carlprekopp.com

Carl James Prekopp (born 25 May 1979) is a British actor. He is acclaimed for his radio plays.

He played Richard III at the Riverside Studios (2010) and originated the part of Lawrence in Tim Firth's stage adaptation of Calendar Girls. Prekopp has appeared in BBC Radio 4 adaptations of Terry Pratchett's Mort (as the title character), Small Gods (as Brutha) and Night Watch (as young Sam Vimes). He directed the Afternoon Play Taken by Suzanne Heathcote for BBC Radio 4, and is a singer/songwriter and founding member of folk/rock band The Fircones featuring The Likely Lads actress Brigit Forsyth on cello.. In 2014, he voiced Lyman Lannister in the video game Game of Thrones. Since 2015, Prekopp has also been voicing the character of Bill Connolly in the audio drama series John Sinclair – Demon Hunter, which is based on the horror detective series of novels written by Helmut Rellergerd.

Prekopp was a supporting actor in the 2007 British feature film I Want Candy with Mackenzie Crook. He has also appeared in Law & Order: UK, Lewis, No Offence, Call the Midwife and Hard Sun. In 2015–16, Prekopp portrayed William III of England and Daniel Defoe in the Royal Shakespeare Company's production of Helen Edmundson's Queen Anne. In 2019, he appeared as Pat in the British psychological horror film Saint Maud.

== Radio ==
| Date | Title | Role | Director | Station |
|---|---|---|---|---|
| 13 May 2002 | Meet Mr. Mulliner: The Smile that Wins | A Small Bitter / Adrian | Ned Chaillet | BBC Radio 4 |
| 3 June 2002 | Meet Mr. Mulliner: Mulliner's Buck-U-Uppo | A Small Bitter / Augustine | Ned Chaillet | BBC Radio 4 |
| 24 December 2002 | Madame Maigret's Own Case | | Ned Chaillet | BBC Radio 4 Afternoon Play |
| 2004 | Mort | Mort | Claire Grove | BBC Radio 4 |
| 5 May 2005 | Stone Baby | Stone Baby | Toby Swift | BBC Radio 3 The Wire |
| 20 July 2005 | Dixon of Dock Green | Doug Beale | Viv Beeby and Jeremy Howe | BBC Radio 4 |
| 5 December 2005 – 30 December 2005 | David Copperfield | Traddles | Jeremy Mortimer | BBC Radio 4 Woman's Hour Drama |
| 18 February 2007 | Hooligan Nights | Harry | Toby Swift | BBC Radio 3 Drama on 3 |
| 28 December 2007 | A Warning to the Furious | Guy | Fiona McAlpine | BBC Radio 4 Afternoon Play |
| 1 August 2008 | One Chord Wonders: This is the Modern World | Hippie | Toby Swift | BBC Radio 4 Friday Play |
| 27 August 2011 | Life After Life | | Toby Swift | BBC World Service BBC World Drama |
| 6 May 2012 | The Tempest | Ariel | Jeremy Mortimer | BBC Radio 3 Shakespeare on 3 |
| 17 December 2012 – 21 December 2012 | Modesty Blaise - A Taste for Death | Willie Garvin | Kate McAll | BBC Radio 4 15 Minute Drama |
| 14 March 2025 | Your England | Narrator | Beth O'Dea | BBC Radio 3 Short Works |
| 12 January 2026 | The Cyberiad by Stanislaw Lem | Reader | | BBC Radio 4 |
