= The Good Guys (British TV series) =

- Genre: Comedy drama
- Starring: Nigel Havers; Keith Barron
- Country of origin: United Kingdom
- Original language: English
- No. of seasons: 2
- No. of episodes: 16

Production
- Executive producers: Nick Elliott; Michael Whitehall (season 1 only)
- Producers: Andrew Montgomery (season 1); Sue Bennett Urwin (season 2)
- Running time: 60 min
- Production company: Havahall Pictures (season 2 only) in association with LWT

Original release
- Network: ITV
- Release: 3 January 1992 – 26 February 1993

The Good Guys is a comedy-drama television series that ran for two series, starting on 3 January 1992 and ending on 26 February 1993. Produced by Havahall Pictures (season 2 only) in association with LWT for ITV, it starred Nigel Havers as Guy McFadyean and Keith Barron as Guy Lofthouse.

== Cast ==
- Nigel Havers as Guy McFadyean
- Keith Barron as Guy Lofthouse

== Episodes ==
Series	Episodes	Originally released	
Series	Episodes	First released	Last released
1	8	3 January 1992	21 February 1992
2	8	8 January 1993	26 February 1993

=== Season 1 (1992) ===
No. overall	No. in season	Title	Directed by	Written by	Original release date
1	1	"Horseplay"	Stuart Urban	John Flanagan, John Fortune and Andrew McCulloch	3 January 1992
2	2	"Easier for a Camel"	Simon Langton	John Fortune	10 January 1992
3	3	"The MacQuarrie Treasure"	Simon Langton	John Fortune	17 January 1992
4	4	"Relative Values"	Roy Ward Baker	John Flanagan	24 January 1992
5	5	"Her Finest Hour"	Stuart Urban	John Fortune	31 January 1992
6	6	"Tooth"	Simon Langton	John Fortune	7 February 1992
7	7	"Verschwinden"	Roy Ward Baker	Jeremy Burnham	14 February 1992
8	8	"Going West"	Stuart Urban	Unknown	21 February 1992

=== Season 2 (1993) ===
No. overall	No. in season	Title	Directed by	Written by	Original release date
9	1	"Moldavian Rhapsody"	Anthony Simmons	Unknown	8 January 1993
10	2	"Old School Ties"	Anthony Simmons	Christopher Matthew	15 January 1993
11	3	"Missing"	Gareth Davies	Christopher Matthew	22 January 1993
12	4	"Death at Sea"	Richard Stroud	Christopher Matthew	29 January 1993
13	5	"All That Sparkles"	Richard Stroud	Philip Martin	5 February 1993
14	6	"All for Love"	Gareth Davies	John Fortune	12 February 1993
15	7	"Dog Days"	Roy Ward Baker	Christopher Matthew	19 February 1993
16	8	"Find the Lady"	Anthony Simmons	Andrew McCulloch	26 February 1993

== Trivia ==
Footage of a young Jack Whitehall is shown during season 1, as the show was produced by his father.
