= Joseph Tremain =

English actor (born 1991)

- Born: 11 October 1991 (age 34); Romford, Havering, United Kingdom
- Occupations: Film, television, theatre actor

Joseph Tremain (born 11 October 1991 in Romford, Havering) is an English actor. He has appeared on radio and in theatre, TV and films. He has also appeared in a number of commercials for a variety of products. Tremain made his West End stage début in a production of The Full Monty at the age of 10. He is best known for starring in the first series (13 episodes) of the children's television series Morris 2274 in 2003 for Five television. He has also appeared in an episode of Half Moon Investigations for the BBC. He attended the Sylvia Young Theatre School in London.

== Filmography ==
=== Film ===
Year	Film	Role	Notes
2002	Veronique	Boy on Bus	Short film
2004	A Christmas Carol	Jonathon	Television film
2005	Oliver Twist	Hungry Boy	
2015	Cusp	Kyle	Short film
2016	The Receptionist	Leo	
2018	Webcast	Ed Dickens	
2019	A Slowdance With Time	Lee	Short film
2020	Education		
2021	The Human Solution	Second Boy	
2021	Many Moon's Strife	Lucas	
2022	D Is For Detroit	Maddox	
2022	Boat Man.		Short film
2024	Don't F**k with Me	The Kingpin	Short film

=== Television ===
Year	Title	Role	Notes
2003	Waking the Dead	Boy 2	Episode: "Multistorey: Part 1"
2003	Morris 2274	Rory Busby	Series regular; 13 episodes
2005	Doctor Who	Jim	Episodes: "The Empty Child" & "The Doctor Dances"
2006	Judge John Deed	Jack Bridges	Episode: "Silent Killer"
2007	The Bill	Kevin Roberts	Episode: "End of the Affair"
2009	Half Moon Investigations	Dominic	Episode: "Red Moon Rising"
2009	M.I. High	Button	Episode: "Think Tank"
