= Tom Kelly (SDLP politician) =

British politician

Tom Kelly, OBE, DL, is an Irish and UK media commentator, businessman and former vice chairman of the Social Democratic and Labour Party in Northern Ireland. The grandson of the IRA War of Independence veteran and Irish Labour activist Tom Kelly, he attended the Abbey Grammar School in Newry followed by the University of Ulster.

He was political assistant to the former Deputy First Minister of Northern Ireland and MP for Newry and Armagh, Seamus Mallon. With the backing of the United States-based National Democratic Institute for International Affairs Kelly set up the Social Democratic Group on behalf of the SDLP. Kelly was the communications director in many of the key SDLP electoral campaigns until 2001. In 1994 he moved into public relations fronting a Belfast office for Dublin-based PR company Drury Communications. He subsequently bought that company out and renamed it Stakeholder Communications. In 2001 he was appointed by the British Secretary of State for Northern Ireland to serve on the first Northern Ireland Policing Board. In 2002 he won the prestigious PRCA Award for the best corporate communications campaign. Kelly was heavily involved in the credit union movement of Ireland. He served as chairman of Newry Credit Union Ltd and drove the media aspect of an all Ireland campaign for a taxation exemption for credit union members. He was the first chairman of Newry City Centre Management Partnership having jointly led the campaign for city status for Newry and Mourne District Council and Newry Chamber of Commerce in 2002. Kelly was also a former chairman of the County Down club - Cumann Naomh Eoin Bosco GFC from 1991 to 1995.

He is a regular media contributor to political and current affairs programmes on the BBC and has a popular weekly column in the leading morning nationalist paper in Northern Ireland, the Irish News. Kelly is a visiting professor at the University of Ulster's School of Communication. In 2005 he was named as one of the top 50 most influential Irishmen in Great Britain by a leading Irish Sunday newspaper. In 2006 he accepted an OBE.

In 2011 Kelly was appointed chairman of Square Up Media in London. He serves as an honorary consul for Malta. In February 2012 the University of Ulster announced the awarding of an honorary doctorate to Kelly for his contribution to the community.
