= Christopher Matthew =

British writer and broadcaster (born 1939)

- Born: Christopher Charles Forrest Matthew; 8 May 1939 (age 87); Lewisham, South London, England
- Education: The King's School, Canterbury; St Peter's College, Oxford
- Occupations: Writer, broadcaster
- Spouse: Wendy
- Children: Two sons, one stepdaughter
- Writing career
- Language: English
- Genres: Books, radio, television
- Notable works: Now We Are Sixty, Diary of a Somebody
- Website: christophermatthew.co.uk

Christopher Charles Forrest Matthew (born 8 May 1939) is a British writer and broadcaster. He is the author of Now We Are Sixty, inspired by the poems of A. A. Milne in the book Now We Are Six, and the chronicler of the life and times of the hapless hero, Simon Crisp, in Diary of a Somebody.

== Early life ==
Matthew was born in Lewisham, South London. As a child he lived in Merle Common, Surrey, and then in nearby Oxted. He spent most of his teenage years in Burnham Market in Norfolk. He was educated at The King's School, Canterbury, and read English at St Peter's College, Oxford.

== Career ==
After a year spent teaching in a girls' finishing school in Switzerland, Matthew worked as a copywriter in various London advertising agencies including JWT, before becoming a full-time writer in 1970.

His books include Diary of a Somebody, Loosely Engaged, The Long-Haired Boy (adapted for TV as A Perfect Hero, starring Nigel Havers), an annotated edition with Benny Green of Three Men in a Boat, The Junket Man, How to Survive Middle Age, Family Matters, The Amber Room, A Nightingale Sang in Fernhurst Road, Now We Are Sixty, Knocking On, Now We Are Sixty (and a Bit), Summoned by Balls, When We Were Fifty, The Man Who Dropped the Le Creuset on His Toe and Other Bourgeois Mishaps, and Dog Treats: An Assortment of Mutts, Mongrels, Puppies and Pooches.

As a journalist, he has been a travel writer for The Sunday Times, a restaurant critic for Vogue, a property correspondent for Punch, and a television and book reviewer for the Daily Mail.

He has written short stories for BBC Radio 4 and his radio plays include A Portrait of Richard Hillary, Madonna's Plumber, and A Nightingale Sang in Fernhurst Road.

He contributed scripts to the ITV series, The Good Guys with Nigel Havers and Keith Barron, and a stage play, Summoned by Betjeman, starring Robert Daws, was performed at the Yvonne Arnaud Theatre, Guildford, the Royal Theatre, Northampton, and Clwyd Theatr Cymru.

In 1983 Matthew, Tim Rice and Benny Green recreated Jerome K. Jerome's classic Thames journey in Three More Men in a Boat for BBC Television.

He has appeared many times over the years on BBC Radio 4 – among other things as chairman of The Travelling Show, presenter of Something to Declare, Points of Departure and Plain Tales from the Rhododendrons, and panellist on Quote Unquote. For several years he worked with Alan Coren on Freedom Pass (nominated for a Sony Award), and with Des Lynam on Touchline Tales. In 2012 he recorded a special Freedom Pass episode with Terry Waite, and in 2013 he and Martin Jarvis journeyed back to their childhood homes in Grey Shorts and Sandals. Most recently he presented a three-hour celebration of the life of Alan Coren – The Sage of Cricklewood – for Pier Productions on BBC Radio 4 Extra.

== Personal life ==
Matthew has two sons and a step-daughter and lives in London and Suffolk with his wife.

== Bibliography ==
- A Different World: Stories of Great Hotels, Paddington Press (1974)
- Diary of a Somebody, Hutchinson (1978)
- Loosely Engaged, Hutchinson (1980)
- The Long-Haired Boy, Hamish Hamilton (1980)
- The Crisp Report, Hutchinson (1981)
- Three Men in a Boat (annotated edition with Benny Green), Pavilion Books (1982)
- The Junket Man, Arrow (1983)
- How to Survive Middle Age, Pavilion Books (1983)
- Family Matters, Hodder & Stoughton (1987)
- The Amber Room, Sinclair-Stevenson (1995)
- A Nightingale Sang in Fernhurst Road, John Murray (1998)
- Now We Are Sixty, John Murray (1999)
- Knocking On, John Murray (2001)
- Now We Are Sixty (and a Bit), John Murray (2003)
- Summoned by Balls, John Murray (2005)
- When We Were Fifty, John Murray (2007)
- The Man Who Dropped the Le Creuset on His Toe and Other Bourgeois Mishaps, Little, Brown (2013)
- Dog Treats: An Assortment of Mutts, Mongrels, Puppies and Pooches, Little, Brown (2014)
- A Bus Pass Named Desire, Little, Brown (2016)
- The Old Man and the Knee: How to be a Golden Oldie, Little, Brown (2017)
