= Radio Drama Company =

- Type: Company of actors
- Industry: Radio broadcasting
- Predecessor: Repertory Drama Company
- Founder: Val Gielgud
- Area served: World

The Radio Drama Company is a company of actors formed by the British Broadcasting Corporation (BBC) in 1939, at the beginning of the Second World War. It is sometimes referred to as RDC, or the Rep, a survival from its original name, the Drama Repertory Company.

The cast of the company changes every six months, and auditions are held for the Carleton Hobbs Bursary, primarily for students graduating from drama courses, to recruit between four and six new members every year. There is also a Norman Beaton Fellowship to bring in actors from non-traditional backgrounds.

== History ==
The company has its origins in a short-lived BBC Repertory Drama Company formed in January 1930, but paid off after a few months. For some years BBC Radio and BBC Television simply hired all the actors they needed by the day. However, with the approach of the Second World War, the key executive, Val Gielgud, head of productions at BBC Radio, proposed that an in-house company of actors would be a useful thing to have in time of war. BBC Television was taken off the air on 1 September 1939 and did not return until some years later. According to one source, in September 1939, with the war now declared, actors were hired for a new radio company and sent to live and work at the Wood Norton Broadcasting Centre. Some actors took their families with them and even their pets, Gielgud himself bringing his cats with him. Another source states that this happened in 1940.

== 21st century ==
In 2015, Rebecca Wilmshurst, BBC production executive for Radio Drama, wrote an article to celebrate the seventy-five years' existence of the company. In the course of this, she boasted that "If your radio script requires actors to be mice, ants, naiads or dryads, men morphing into hares, maggots in a fisherman’s sack, or even a tray of fancy cakes – look no further than to the Radio Drama Company."

The cast of the company changes every six months. Auditions are held for the Carleton Hobbs Bursary, in memory of the veteran actor Carleton Hobbs (1898–1978), primarily for students graduating from drama courses, with the aim of recruiting between four and six new members of the Radio Drama Company every year. Those chosen receive a contract of employment for six months, and some runners-up are also offered work in particular productions.

The company aims to build links with theatre companies all over Britain, to develop new talent for radio and also to encourage applicants for its Norman Beaton Fellowship, which has the aim of bringing in actors "from non-traditional training backgrounds" and ethnic minorities. It encourages applications by letter from actors wishing to be auditioned.

== Carleton Hobbs Bursary winners ==
Until 1997 two bursaries were awarded each year, in 1998 the number was increased to six, and then in 2003 it fell back to five and in 2004 to four.

== Notable members ==
- Gladys Young (1887–1975)
- Laidman Browne (1896–1961), founder member
- Bessie Love (1898–1986)
- Richard Hurndall (1910–1984)
- Norman Bird (1924–2005)
- Edward Kelsey (1930–2019)
- John Forrest (1931–2012)
- Patrick Godfrey (1933–2026)
- Jeremy Kemp (1935–2019)
- Ann Beach (1938–2017)
- Nerys Hughes (born 1941)
- Petronella Barker (born 1942)
- Clive Merrison (born 1945)
- Anthony Daniels (born 1946)
- Carolyn Pickles (born 1952)
- Timothy Bentinck (born 1953)
- Janet Maw (born 1954)
- Joanna Monro (born 1956)
- Alex Jennings (born 1957)
- Ben Onwukwe (born 1957)
- Elizabeth Rider (born 1957)
- Suzanna Hamilton (born 1960)
- Adjoa Andoh (born 1963)
- Stephen Tompkinson (born 1965)
- Emma Fielding (born 1966)
- Mark Bonnar (born 1968)
- Annabel Mullion (born 1969)
- Jamie Zubairi (born 1972)
- Lydia Leonard (born 1981)
- Joseph Kloska (born 1983)
- Robert Lonsdale (born 1983)
- Ella Smith (born 1983)
- Emerald O'Hanrahan (born 1987)
