= Debatable Space =

2008 science fiction novel by Philip Palmer

- First edition
- Author: Philip Palmer
- Cover artist: Lee Gibbons
- Language: English
- Publisher: Orbit Books
- Publication place: United Kingdom
- Media type: Print (Paperback)
- Pages: 488
- ISBN: 978-0-316-01892-0

Debatable Space is a 2008 science fiction novel by novelist and screenwriter Philip Palmer.

The book alternates between telling the story of the main character, Lena Smith, in the form of a diary and a first-person narrative of events which take place roughly 1000 years from the present day. Each section of the POV narrative bears the name of the character it follows.

The book is billed as a space opera.

== List of characters ==
- Lena Smith - The main character of the novel, former president of humanity and mother of 'the Cheo'.
- Flanagan - Who is, for want of a better word, a pirate.
- Peter Smith aka The Cheo ("Chief Executive Officer") - The despotic ruler of the known universe

== Reception ==
It received mixed reviews, with the Guardian describing it as "a debut of rare accomplishment", and Strange Horizons describing it as having "a pretty good twisty plot at the core of the novel—but sadly [...] buried underneath layers of cinematic flash-bang frippery and clunky long-winded exposition." SF Signal described it as "not always successful, but [...] definitely a promising start."
