= David Seddon =

British academic

David Seddon is a noted British Development Studies academic, activist and consultant. For many years, he was a professor (Professor of Politics & Sociology) in the School of Development Studies (DEV) at the University of East Anglia. He has worked as a consultant for international institutions including the World Bank, ILO and NGOs such as Christian Aid, OXFAM and War on Want. He was for many years a member of the Labour Party before defecting to the Green Party. Among his academic research, particularly noteworthy is his work on Nepal.

== Selected publications ==
- Blaikie, P., Cameron, J., & Seddon, D. (2017). Understanding 20 years of change in West-Central Nepal: Continuity and change in lives and ideas. In Development (pp. 465-480). Routledge.
- Walton, J. K., & Seddon, D. (2008). Free markets and food riots: The politics of global adjustment. John Wiley & Sons.
- Seddon, D., Adhikari, J., & Gurung, G. (2002). Foreign labor migration and the remittance economy of Nepal. Critical Asian Studies, 34(1), 19–40.
- Seddon, D. (Ed.). (1978). Relations of production: Marxist approaches to economic anthropology. Psychology Press.
- Powell, M., & Seddon, D. (1997). NGOs & the development industry. Review of African Political Economy, 24(71), 3-10.
