= Brian B. Thompson =

British screenwriter and playwright

Brian B. Thompson is a BAFTA-nominated British television, theatre and radio writer whose work includes Byker Grove, Grafters, The Bill and Coronation Street. He also created the detective series Trueman and Riley, broadcast on BBC Radio 4 and Radio 4 Extra from 2002 to 2012 (Producer, Toby Swift). Brian co-created the regional soap Quayside (Director Tom Hooper) for Tyne Tees TV, and worked on the first series of Revelations for Granada Television. Theatre includes Derby Day (London Fringe Awards, Best Comedy) produced by Yorkshire Theatre Company. Thompson has also written a number of radio plays including Soap Gets in Your Eyes (Friday Play) and Full English (Afternoon Play).
