= John Dougall (actor) =

British actor

John Dougall is a British actor. He trained at the Royal Scottish Academy of Music and Drama. He is notable for his appearances on television, radio and the stage, including Anne Boleyn (2010, Shakespeare's Globe) and several productions for Propeller.

After leaving the Royal Scottish Academy of Music and Drama he spent two year in school and community theatre work in Inverness, Pitlochry and Glasgow. At the Swan Theatre in Worcester he played Jim Hawkins in Treasure Island and Kinesias in Lysistrata. He played Tommy Judd in Another Country at the Queen's Theatre in the West End. In 1983–84 Dougall played a twin in Peter Pan for the Royal Shakespeare Company at the Barbican Theatre in London.

Dougall has played a wide range of roles in Shakespeare plays, including Henry VIII, Measure for Measure, Coriolanus, and The Winter's Tale for the Globe Theatre, A Midsummer Night's Dream, Twelfth Night, The Taming of the Shrew, Henry V, The Winter's Tale, Richard III, The Comedy of Errors and The Merchant of Venice for Propeller, and Hamlet, Macbeth, and The Two Gentlemen of Verona for the Royal Shakespeare Company.

Other works has included The Devil is an Ass, The Cherry Orchard, and The Crucible for the RSC, Saint Joan at the Strand Theatre; Shadow of a Gunman and John Bull's Other Island for the Tricycle Theatre, and roles at Menier Chocolate Factory, Greenwich Theatre, the Oxford Stage Company, the Birmingham Repertory Theatre, Six Characters in Search of an Author for the National Theatre of Scotland, and The Comedy of Errors and Translations at the Lyric Theatre, Belfast.

Dougall has appeared on television (including Measure for Measure from the Globe) and has been cast in over 50 dramas on BBC Radio. These include Dracula, Dr Zhivago, Fortunes of War, Hamlet, Rosencrantz and Guildenstern are Dead, Arcadia, The Silver Fox, Conan Doyle: A Life in Letters, The Lamplighter and Real Recordings in a Fictional City.
