= Jordan Murphy (English actor) =

English actor

- Born: 14 January 1988 (age 37)
- Occupation: Actor

Jordan Murphy (born 14 January 1988) is an English actor.

== Career ==
Murphy is perhaps best known for his role as Arnold "Chop" Peters on the E4 teen comedy-drama series My Mad Fat Diary (2013–2015). He has also appeared in series such as The Project, Casualty, The Bill, and Doctor Who. In 2012, he appeared in the film Spike Island.

== Filmography ==
Year	Title	Role	Notes
2002	The Project	Young Ray	
2004	Casualty	Liam Fisher	'Episode: "A Life Lost"
2005	The Bill	Josh Giggs	2 episodes
2005	Doctor Who	Ernie	2 episodes
2005-2010	Shameless	Peter / Kid #1	2 episodes
2006	Waterloo Road	Hadleigh Flynn	2 episodes
2006	The Street	Scally	
2007	The Last Detective	Jerome	
2009	Two Pints of Lager and a Packet of Crisps	Mugger	Episode: "Flan Van"
2009	Hollyoaks	Sinclair	
2010	Grown Ups	Hoodie	
2012	Spike Island	Zippy	
2013–2015	My Mad Fat Diary	Arnold "Chop" Peters	13 episodes
2014	Marvellous	Laino	
2014	The Passing Bells	Ben	5 episodes
