= Classic Serial =

British radio drama

- Genre: Radio drama
- Running time: 1 hour (3:00 pm – 4:00 pm)
- Country of origin: United Kingdom
- Language(s): English
- Home station: BBC Radio 4

Classic Serial was a strand on BBC Radio 4, which broadcasts in series of one-hour dramas, "Adaptations of works which have achieved classic status." It is broadcast twice weekly, first from 3:00–4:00 pm on Sunday, then repeated from 9:00–10:00 pm the next Saturday.

Works adapted have included The Aeneid, On the Beach, and A Dance to the Music of Time, featuring such actors as Joss Ackland, Kenneth Branagh, and Judi Dench.
