= Drama (BBC Radio 4) =

BBC Radio 4 radio drama, broadcast every weekday

Drama (formerly Afternoon Theatre, Afternoon Drama, Afternoon Play) is a BBC Radio 4 radio drama, broadcast every weekday at 2.15pm. Generally each play is 45 minutes in duration and approximately 190 new plays are broadcast each year. More or less three-quarters are self-contained dramas. The remainder are short series of 2 to 6 episodes. As well as original drama series, the Afternoon Play has included a number of adaptations of popular works such as The No. 1 Ladies' Detective Agency.

== History ==
In one form or another, the Afternoon Play has been a feature of afternoons on Radio 4 since its launch in 1967, although the strict 45 minute format was not enforced until the reorganisation of Radio 4 by James Boyle in 1998, whereby the play directly follows the 2.00pm repeat of The Archers.

Several Afternoon Plays were amongst programmes held in 20 underground radio stations of the BBC's Wartime Broadcasting Service, to provide public information and morale-boosting broadcasts for 100 days after a nuclear attack.

The strand was retitled in February 2012, to bring it in line with BBC television's "Original British Drama" branding.

== Listening figures ==
In May 2009 it was announced that the listening figures for the Afternoon Play fluctuated between 800,000 and 1.1 million, making it one of the most popular outlets for new dramatic writing in the world. Monday's Afternoon Play is usually the most popular play of the week, and Thursday's is usually the least popular.
