= Cultural depictions of Richard I of England =

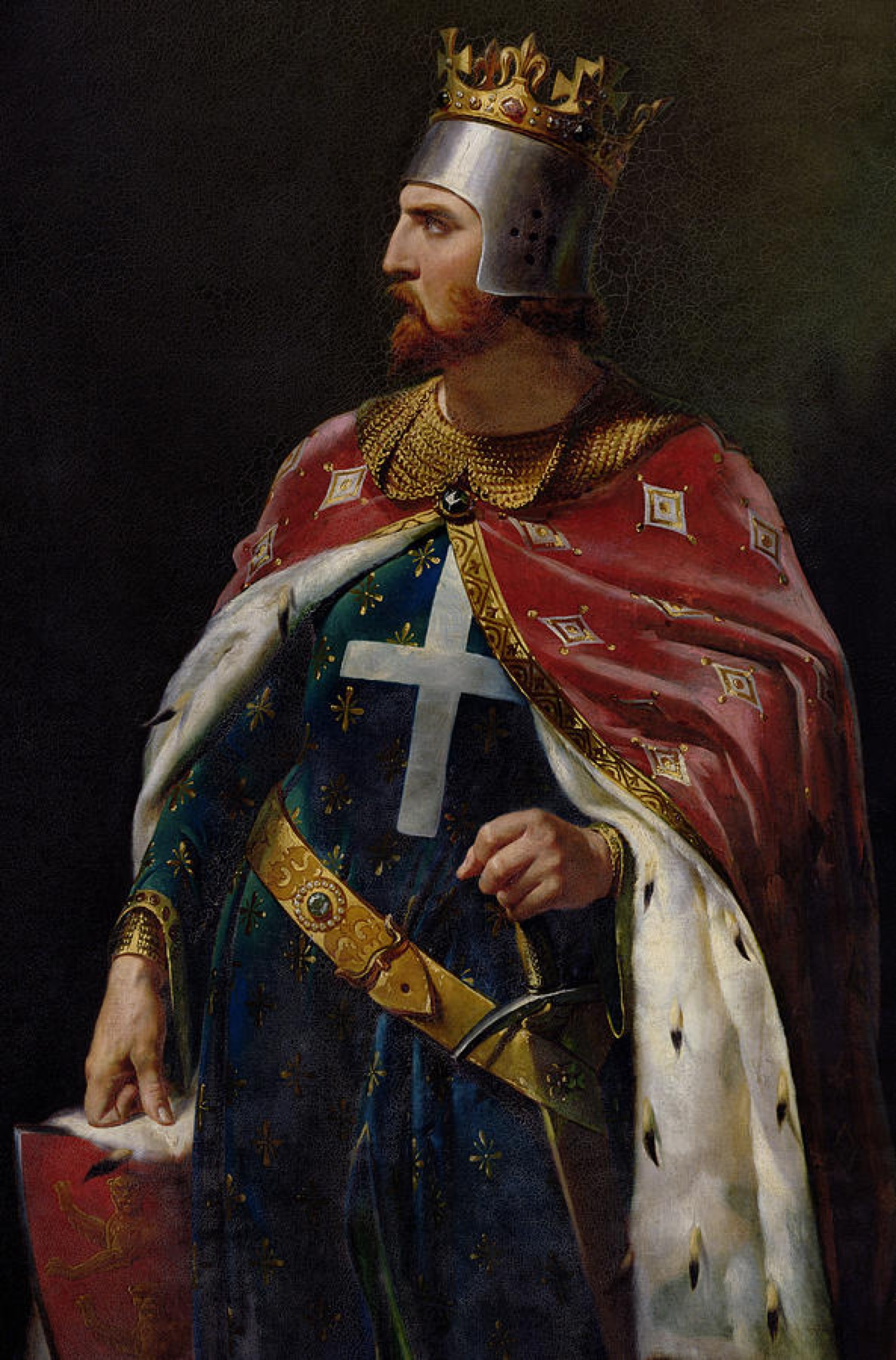
19th-century portrait of Richard I by Merry-Joseph Blondel

Richard I of England has been depicted many times in romantic fiction and popular culture.

== Robin Hood ==
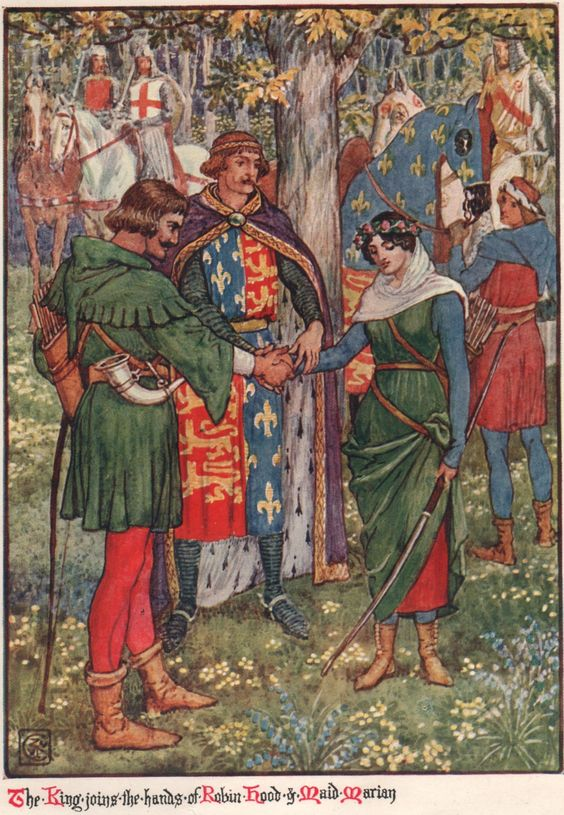
The King joins the hands of Robin Hood and Maid Marian, an illustration by Walter Crane from the book Robin Hood and the Men of the Greenwood by Henry Gilbert.

The Scots philosopher and chronicler John Mair was the first to associate Richard with the Robin Hood legends in his Historia majoris Britannae, tam Angliae quam Scotiae (1521). In the earliest Robin Hood ballads the only king mentioned is "Edward our comely king", most probably Edward II or Edward III. However, Sir Walter Scott's novel Ivanhoe popularised Mair's linking of the Hood legends to Richard's reign, and it was taken up by later novelists and by cinema. Typically Robin is depicted upholding justice in Richard's name against John and his officials during the king's imprisonment. Richard appears in the novella about Robin Hood, Maid Marian (1822), by Thomas Love Peacock.

== Other literature ==
Richard has appeared frequently in fiction, latterly as a result of the 'chivalric revival' of the Romantic era.

=== Medieval ===
- The verse romance Richard Coer de Lyon, written around the start of the fourteenth century, fictionalises and celebrates Richard's exploits on the Third Crusade. Two versions survive: the longer version incorporates more fantastical material and is unusual in its portrayal of Richard as - while also being the hero - a quasi-demonic figure and a cannibal.

=== Post-medieval ===
- The Adventures of King Richard Coeur-de-Lion (1791) by James White is a humorous historical novel about Richard's adventures.
- In 1822, he was the subject of Eleanor Anne Porden's epic poem, Cœur de Lion.
- After Ivanhoe, in which he is depicted as initially adopting the pseudonym of Le Noir Fainéant ("The Black Sluggard"), Sir Walter Scott portrayed Richard in The Talisman (1825), a highly fictionalized treatment of the Third Crusade.
- In her poem The Troubadour and Richard Cœur de Lion., Felicia Hemans relates how Richard was discovered in captivity by the troubadour, Blondel.
- Winning His Spurs: A Tale of the Crusades (1882) (a.k.a. Boy Knight) by G. A. Henty, is a novel about a young noble, Cuthbert, who accompanies Richard during the Third Crusade. According to historian Mike Horswell, Winning His Spurs depicts Richard as "a man of action, inspirational leader and phenomenal fighter".
- The Merry Adventures of Robin Hood (1883) by Howard Pyle, features a heroic and admirable depiction of King Richard. This book helped popularize the connection between the Robin Hood legends and Richard.
- Maurice Hewlett's novel The Life and Death of Richard Yea-and-Nay (1900) is a novel about Richard's life.
- The Assassins (1902), a novel by Nevill Myers Meakin (1876-1912), features Richard, Philip II of France and Saladin, in a plot involving the Order of Assassins.
- The juvenile novel Lion-Heart: A Story of the Reign of Richard I (1910) by "Herbert Strang" and Richard Stead, is a tale about Richard, that is influenced by Henty's work.
- Walter of Tiverton (1923) by Bernard G. Marshall, is another juvenile novel where two young knights help Richard resist the plots of Prince John.
- Unhurrying Chase (1925) by H. F. M. Prescott, revolves around the conflict between the novel's protagonist, a young Frenchman, and Richard.
- "Hawks of Outremer" (1931) by Robert E. Howard, is a short story that features a brief appearance by Richard.
- Kay, the Left-Handed (1935) by Leslie Barringer deals with Richard's travels abroad and the effects of his absence from England.
- The Golden Knight (1937), written by Frederick Schiller Faust under the pseudonym "George Challis", focuses on Richard's captivity in Austria.
- The Passionate Brood by Margaret Campbell Barnes (1945) is based on the legend of Blondel de Nesle's quest to find Richard.
- King's Man (1948) by C. M. Edmondston and M. L. F. Hyde, is a juvenile novel exploring the working relationship between William Marshal and Richard.
- Harold Lamb wrote a short story "Lionheart" (1949), which focuses on Richard near the end of his life.
- Gore Vidal's novel A Search for the King (1950) also retells the legend of Blondel and Richard.
- Ronald Welch's novel Knight Crusader (1954), depicts Richard as a hero.
- John Jakes published a novel, Sir Scoundrel (1962) about Richard and Blondel. Sir Scoundrel was published under Jakes' pen-name Jay Scotland. Jakes later revised the novel and published it under his own name as King's Crusader (1977). Jakes' novel is one of the first works of fiction to depict Richard as a homosexual.
- The young Richard is also a major character in James Goldman's play The Lion in Winter (1966), which depicts him as homosexual.
- Molly Costain Haycraft's My Lord Brother, the Lion Heart (1968) is a novel that centres on the relationship between Richard and his sister, Joan of England.
- He features in Graham Shelby's The Kings of Vain Intent and, more centrally, in The Devil is Loose, Norah Lofts' The Lute-Player, Jean Plaidy's The Heart of the Lion, Cecelia Holland's The King's Witch, and Sharon Kay Penman's The Devil's Brood and Lionheart.
- Richard is depicted in The Isle of Glass (1985) by Judith Tarr, the first volume of her historical fantasy trilogy The Hound and the Falcon.
- Swedish author Jan Guillou depicts Richard as a merciless Muslim killer in The Knight Templar (Crusades trilogy), while Rachel Bard's Queen Without a Country portrays him as Berengaria of Navarre's reluctant husband.
- Tariq Ali depicts Richard in his novel The Book of Saladin (1998). Here Richard is given the derisive nick-name "Richard the Lion-Arse" by Saladin's soldiers. According to Reed Way Dasenbrock, Ali's Richard "breaks his word repeatedly and falls quite short of the standard of chivalry and courtesy set by Salah-ud-din".
- Richard appears in several of the Crowner John historical mystery novels by Bernard Knight, beginning with The Sanctuary Seeker (1998).
- Kamran Pasha depicts Richard in his novel, Shadow of the Swords (2010). This depicts Richard during his conflict with Saladin, and also has Richard meeting the Jewish philosopher Maimonides.
- Richard is referenced in Jennifer Roberson's novels Lady of the Forest and Lady of Sherwood.
- Richard appears in the Japanese Light novel Fate/strange fake as a Saber class servant.

== Theatre ==
- In 1966 James Rado played Richard in the original Broadway production of The Lion in Winter by James Goldman.
- In 2011 Tom Bateman played Richard in The Lion in Winter in the plays West End theatre debut.
- In 2014 a play written by David Eldridge featuring Richard I, Holy Warriors, was performed at the Shakespeare's Globe. The 2014 run of Holy Warriors featured John Hopkins as Richard I, as well as Alexander Siddig as Saladin.

== Opera ==
- Isacio tiranno (1710) by Antonio Lotti is based loosely on Richard's conquest of Cyprus.
- Riccardo primo, re d'Inghilterra (1727) by George Frideric Handel is based Lotti's Isacio.
- Richard Coeur-de-lion (1784) by André Grétry recounts the story of Richard's imprisonment and the legend of his discovery by Blondel de Nesle.
- Richard en Palestine (1844) by Adolphe Adam
- Richard also appears in some operatic adaptations of Scott's novels Ivanhoe and The Talisman, including:
  - Il Talismano ossia La Terza Crociata in Palestina (1829) by Giovanni Pacini
  - Der Templer und die Jüdin (1829) by Heinrich Marschner
  - Il Talismano (1874) by Michael Balfe (completed by Michael Costa)
  - Ivanhoe (1891) by Sir Arthur Sullivan (1891)

== Film ==
Richard has been portrayed on film by:

- Arthur Hollingsworth in the silent short Robin Hood (1912)
- Walter Craven in the silent adaptation of Ivanhoe (1913)
- Walter Gibbs in the silent Robin Hood (1913)
- Wallace Beery in the silent films Robin Hood (1922), with Douglas Fairbanks as Robin, and Richard the Lion-Hearted (1923), based on The Talisman
- S. J. Bingham in the silent Robin Hood, Jr. (1923)
- Henry Wilcoxon in Cecil B. DeMille's The Crusades (1935)
- Ian Hunter in The Adventures of Robin Hood (1938), with Errol Flynn as Robin
- Patrick Barr in The Story of Robin Hood and His Merrie Men (1952), with Richard Todd as Robin and in The Adventures of Robin Hood (1955–59) with Richard Greene as Robin.
- Norman Wooland in Ivanhoe (1952), with Robert Taylor as Ivanhoe
- Patrick Holt in The Men of Sherwood Forest (1954)
- George Sanders in King Richard and the Crusaders (1954), loosely based on The Talisman
- Hamdi Geiss in Egyptian director Youssef Chahine's El Naser Salah el Dine (1963)
- Anthony Hopkins in the film adaptation of The Lion in Winter (1968), for which he was nominated for the BAFTA Award for Best Supporting Actor
- Lars Bloch in the Italian film L'Arciere di Sherwood (1970)
- Frankie Howerd in the comedy Up the Chastity Belt (1971), in which Richard is revealed to be the double of the main character, Lurkalot (also played by Howerd)
- Peter Ustinov in the Disney animated film Robin Hood (1973), in which he also voiced Prince John. Both were lions, in reference to his title 'Lionheart'. In this film, Richard is depicted as the uncle of Maid Marian.
- Richard Harris in Robin and Marian (1976). This is a revisionist version, depicting Richard as obsessive and murderous rather than heroic.
- Neil Dickson in Lionheart (1987)
- Sean Connery briefly (and uncredited) at the end of Robin Hood: Prince of Thieves (1991)
- Aleksandr Baluev in the Russian film Richard the Lion-Hearted (1992), based on The Talisman
- Patrick Stewart in Mel Brooks's parody Robin Hood: Men in Tights (1993)
- Iain Glen briefly (and uncredited) at the end of Kingdom of Heaven (2005)
- Danny Huston in Ridley Scott's Robin Hood (2010)
- Greg Maness in Richard The Lionheart (2013) and Richard the Lionheart: Rebellion (2015)

== Television ==
Richard has been portrayed on television by:

- David Markham in the BBC series Robin Hood (1953), with Patrick Troughton as Robin
- Bruce Seton in the British series Ivanhoe (1958)
- Dermot Walsh in the British children's series Richard the Lionheart (1962–1963)
- Jon Cypher in the "Robin Hood" episode of the American series Children's Theater (1964)
- Julian Glover in the Doctor Who story "The Crusade" (1965), set during Richard's conflict with Saladin, and again in the TV film Ivanhoe (1982)
- Douglas Fairbanks, Jr. in the American TV musical film The Legend of Robin Hood (1968)
- Bernard Horsfall in the BBC series Ivanhoe (1970)
- Michael J. Jackson in the BBC series The Legend of Robin Hood (1975)
- Lawrence Clark (aged 7), Paul Rose (aged 13), Glen Barlow (aged about 18), and Michael Byrne (as an adult) in the BBC series The Devil's Crown (1978), which dramatised his reign and that of his father and brother
- Stephan Chase in the BBC series The Talisman (1980)
- Robert Hardy in the American TV film parody The Zany Adventures of Robin Hood (1984)
- John Rhys-Davies in "The King's Fool" episode of the British series Robin of Sherwood (1984). This version depicts Richard as a villain, who tries to have Robin Hood killed when he realises he cannot control him.
- Forbes Collins in "The Whitish Knight" episode of the BBC children's comedy series Maid Marian and her Merry Men (1989), in which he also played Prince John.
- Mugihito voiced King Richard in the anime Robin Hood no Daibōken where he arrives near the end to assist Robin and his allies in overthrowing both his brother Prince John and Baron Alwyn.
- Marek Vašut in the TV film Young Ivanhoe (1995)
- Rory Edwards in the British series Ivanhoe (1997)
- Andrew Howard in the TV film adaptation of The Lion in Winter (2003)
- Steven Waddington in the "We Are Robin Hood!" episode of the BBC series Robin Hood (2007); he also portrayed King Richard in the BBC drama documentary "Heroes and Villains: Richard the Lionheart" (2008)
- Mathew Baynton, Adam Riches, Tom Stourton, James McNicholas and Paul G Raymond in the British children's sketchshow Horrible Histories (2009 - 2015)
- Nice Peter in a season 7 episode of Epic Rap Battles of History (2021), in which the Lionheart faces Ragnar Lodbrok as portrayed by EpicLLOYD.
- Yūki Ono voices Richard in the anime adaptation of Fate/strange Fake where he is summoned as the Saber class servant to Ayaka Sajō (voiced by Kana Hanazawa).

== Radio ==
- Richard is played by Ed Stoppard in Mike Walker's BBC Radio 4 series Plantagenet (2010).

== Comics ==
- Richard appeared in a 1950 storyline in the Alley Oop comic strip by V.T. Hamlin.
- Richard was depicted in two different issues of the Classics Illustrated comics series. The first was a 1953 adaption of Walter Scott's The Talisman, and the second was a 1955 adaption of Scott's Ivanhoe.
- Richard is a central figure in Nottingham (2021-2025), published by Mad Cave Studios. Nottingham is a medieval noir retelling of the Robin Hood legend focused on the Sheriff of Nottingham. The second volume (issues 6-10) describes the Sheriff and Robin Hood's attempt to free Richard from his post-Crusade kidnapping, while the third volume (issues 11-15) features Richard as a ruthless crusader king.

== Video games ==
- In the Robin Hood-inspired adventure game Conquests of the Longbow, Richard is featured as a prisoner of Leopold of Austria. As in the previously mentioned legends, Robin Hood is working to raise 100,000 marks in ransom to release Richard.
- The strategy game Medieval: Total War features two battles based on Richard's encounters with his rival Saladin: the battle of Jaffa and the battle of Arsuf.
- The sequel, Medieval II: Total War, shows Richard on the box cover, and the player has the opportunity to play the Battle of Arsuf. Richard is also included the expansion pack Medieval II: Total War: Kingdoms, where he makes an appearance during the Crusades campaign.
- In Empires: Dawn of the Modern World, his campaign is pre-1190 and sees him fight French King Philip II.
- Richard is one of the main Crusader characters in the real-time strategy game Stronghold: Crusader, appearing on the box cover, in one of the historical campings and as an AI Lord in the Skirmish mode.
- In Age of Empires 2, Richard can be played in battle against Saladin.
- In Age of Empires: The Age of Kings for Nintendo DS, Richard the Lionheart is a usable hero and the final campaign features six missions based upon him, including the Battle of Arsuf and a fictional assault on Jerusalem.
- In Lionheart: Legacy of the Crusader, the player character is a 16th-century descendant of Richard I. The game follows an alternate history timeline in which Richard's execution of the prisoners after the capture of Acre completed a ritual that unleashed magic and demons into the world.
- In the 2007 action-adventure video game Assassin's Creed, set in the time of the Third Crusade, Richard plays a major part in the story, making several appearances and at one point interacting with the main character. Richard speaks English with a French accent in the game as a reference to the fact that he spoke Occitan (native mother tongue), Latin, Anglo-Norman language and Old French, and barely knew Old English or Middle English in real life.
- In Civilization II, King Richard's Crusade is one of the Wonders of the World. This Wonder provides increased production.
