= Cultural depictions of William Marshal, 1st Earl of Pembroke =

William Marshal, 1st Earl of Pembroke (1146 or 1147 – 14 May 1219) was an Anglo-Norman soldier and statesman. He served five English kings – Henry II, his sons the "Young King" Henry, Richard I, and John, and John's son Henry III.

== Cultural depictions ==
- William Marshal appears in two romance novels by Marsha Canham: In the Shadow of Midnight and The Last Arrow
- William appears (named only as the Earl of Pembroke) in William Shakespeare's historical play King John.
- William Marshal is a central character in the traditional English ballad "Queen Elanor's Confession" (Child 156), in which he is (fictitiously) revealed to have seduced Eleanor of Aquitaine while escorting her to England.
- Four generations of the Marshal family, from Isabel de Clare's parents through William fitzWilliam's fictitious bastard son, are the subjects of a series of four historical romances by Mary Pershall. Dawn of the White Rose (1985) is the one about William Marshal and Isabel de Clare.
- William Marshal appears in four of the books authored by Jean Plaidy on the Plantagenet Kings: The Revolt of the Eaglets (where he fights for Henry II), The Heart of the Lion (his relation with Richard Coeur de Lion), The Black Prince (his relation with King John Lackland) and The War of the Queens (in his role as regent of Henry III). His daughter Isabella also appears in the next book of the Saga, The Queen from Provence, as Richard of Cornwall's first wife.
- King's Man (1948) by C. M. Edmondston and M. L. F. Hyde, is a juvenile novel exploring the working relationship between William Marshal and three of his royal masters - Henry II, Richard I, and John.
- William Marshal also appears as a supporting character in Thomas B. Costain's novel Below the Salt, and Sharon Kay Penman's novels Time and Chance and Devil's Brood, as well as a minor appearance in Penman's When Christ and His Saints Slept, illustrating the story about young William's time as King Stephen's hostage and John Marshal's defiance.

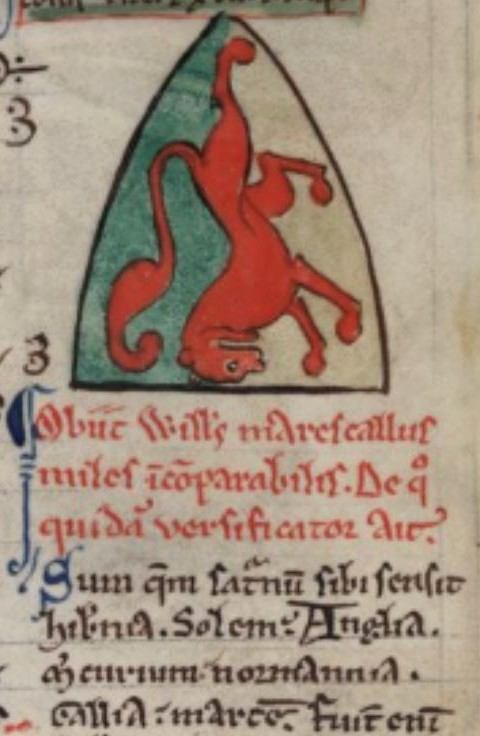
The incomparable knight by Matthew Paris in memoriam

- William Marshal makes an appearance in James Blish's historical novel, Doctor Mirabilis. He appears at the Convocation at Westminster, and in absentia on his temporary break with Henry III. Blish himself acknowledges the historicity of Marshall, and further notes that in the company of Sir Miles Bonecor that they appear "... as martial spear carriers in this account..." Ultimately, William is merely a figure present in the plot as opposed to a significant mover of events within this particular novel.
- William Marshal is the main character of the novel A Pride of Kings by Juliet Dymoke, published by the New English Library in 1978.
- William Marshal is a significant secondary character in the novel The Witch Hunter by Bernard Knight, in the author's John Crowner medieval mystery series, published in 2004.
- A new novel about William Marshal, The Greatest Knight by Elizabeth Chadwick, based on primary sources and the main secondary source biographies of professors Painter, Duby and Crouch was published by Time Warner Books on 3 November 2005. A sequel, The Scarlet Lion followed in 2006. As one of the prominent historical figures of the period, Marshal also appears as a minor character in several of her other novels set around the same time.
- In film, Marshal makes a minor appearance in 1968's The Lion in Winter, portrayed by Nigel Stock. Clive Wood portrays Marshal in the 2003 remake.
- The author of The Lion in Winter, James Goldman, also used William Marshal as a supporting character in his novel about King John Myself As Witness (1979).
- Another novel about William and his wife is Champion (in German "Der Ritter der Könige) from Christian Balling of the year 1988.
- William Marshal is a major character in the novels The Devil is Loose and its sequel, Wolf at the Door by Graham Shelby. The books are about Richard Lionheart and King John, and are historical fictions about the events after the death of Henry II and the fall of the Angevin Empire.
- William Marshal also has 2 appearances in the historical romance novels "The Falcon and the Flower" and "The Dragon and the Jewel" by author Virginia Henley.
- He is a major character in Mike Walker's BBC Radio 4 series of plays Plantagenet and is played by Stephen Hogan.
- William Marshal is a major character in Sir Ridley Scott's Robin Hood epic who tries to convince King John to agree to Magna Carta. He is played by William Hurt.
- In another Robin Hood film, The Bandit of Sherwood Forest (1946), as the regent William of Pembroke, played by Henry Daniell, an entirely fictitious characterisation as a scheming villain who kidnaps young Henry III and revokes Magna Carta.
- William Marshal is also a key character in Christopher Morley's new play The King's Disposition.
- Peter Robert's radio play Holy Fool is about William Marshal (played by William Chubb) narrated by his squire (played by Michael Williams).
- A character named "Marshal" (played by James Purefoy), based loosely on the historical William Marshal, is the central character in the 2011 film Ironclad.
- An alternate history of William Marshal is in Martin Archer's multi-book saga "The Archers" - the young William is revealed as a young archer who evolves into William the Marshal and places his grandson on the throne.
- William Marshal is also the main inspiration for Heath Ledger's character, William Thatcher, in the movie A Knight's Tale.
- William Marshal is also a major secondary character in the 2018 video game Vampyr.
- William Marshal is a secondary point-of-view character in Ben Kane's 2020 historical novel Lionheart.
