= Cultural depictions of Edward I of England =

Edward I of England has been portrayed in popular culture a number of times.

== Literature ==
Edward's life was dramatised in the Famous Chronicle of King Edward the First, a Renaissance theatrical play by George Peele.

Edward I was often featured in historical fictions written in the Victorian and Edwardian Eras. Novels featuring Edward from this period include Truths and Fictions of the Middle Ages (1837) by Francis Palgrave, G. P. R. James's Robin Hood novel Forest Days; or Robin Hood (1843), The Lord of Dynevor: A Tale of the Times of Edward the First (1892) by Evelyn Everett-Green, Simon de Montfort; or, The third siege of Rochester Castle by Edwin Harris (1902), and De Montfort's squire. A story of the battle of Lewes by the Reverend Frederick Harrison (1909) The Prince and the Page: A Story of the Last Crusade (1866) by Charlotte Mary Yonge, is about Edward's involvement in the Ninth Crusade, and depicts Edward as chivalrous and brave.

The 1921 play The King's Jewery (also known as The King's Jewry) by the playwright Halcott Glover (d. 1949) deals with Edward's relationship with England's Jewish community. The Baron's Hostage (1952) by Geoffrey Trease depicts Edward as a young man, and features Edward taking part in the Battle of Evesham.

Edward is unflatteringly depicted in several novels with a contemporary setting, including the Brothers of Gwynedd quartet by Edith Pargeter, where Edward is depicted as the antagonist of the novel's Welsh heroes. Edward I also appears in The Reckoning and Falls the Shadow by Sharon Penman, The Wallace and The Bruce Trilogy by Nigel Tranter, and the Brethren trilogy by Robyn Young, a fictional account of Edward and his involvement with a secret organisation within the Knights Templar. In the Hugh Corbett historical mystery novels by Paul C. Doherty, the titular hero is employed by Edward I to solve crimes.

Hungarian poet Janos Arany's ballad The Bards of Wales retells the legend of the 500 Welsh bards, who were burned at the stake by King Edward I of England for refusing to sing his praises during a banquet at Montgomery Castle, following the Plantagenet conquest of Wales.

The poem was meant as a veiled attack against Emperor Franz Joseph and Tsar Nicholas I of Russia for their roles in the defeat of the Hungarian Revolution of 1848 and for the repressive policies in the Kingdom of Hungary that followed the end of the uprising.

Edward I is an inspiration for Tywin Lannister in George R. R. Martin’s series of fantasy novels, A Song of Ice and Fire.

== Film and television ==
- Edward I has also been portrayed by Michael Rennie in the 1950 film The Black Rose, based on the novel by Thomas B. Costain.
- Edward was portrayed by Patrick McGoohan as a psychopathic tyrant in the 1995 film Braveheart, in which he is referred to as a 'pagan'. Though the film exaggerates Edward's brutality, his physical and mental abuse of his son and heir before the whole court, as well as his disdain for the Scots, is for the most part accurately depicted.
- Edward was played, as an idealist by Brian Blessed, in the 1996 film The Bruce.
- Edward was played by Donald Sumpter in the 2008 BBC TV comedy-drama Heist.
- Edward was played by Stephen Dillane in the 2018 Netflix historical drama film Outlaw King.
- Edward I served as an inspiration for Tywin Lannister in the HBO television series Game of Thrones.

== Radio ==
- Edward was played by Noel Johnson in a 1958 BBC Home Service Children's Hour adaption of Trease's The Baron's Hostage.
- Edward was played by Philip Jackson in Mike Walker's BBC Radio 4 series Plantagenet.

== Video games ==
Edward is featured as the main antagonist in the cutscenes of the tutorial campaign of the 1999 video game Age of Empires II: The Age of Kings. He is featured as the protagonist of his own campaign in the Age of Empires II: Definitive Edition expansion Lords of the West.
