= Witch hunter =

A witch hunter is a person who seeks witches in a witch-hunt.

Witch hunter or variations may also refer to:

== Film and television ==
- Witch Hunter Robin, a Japanese anime television series
- El Cazador de la Bruja (English: The Hunter of the Witch), a Japanese anime television series
- Hansel & Gretel: Witch Hunters, a 2013 American film
- The Last Witch Hunter, a 2015 American film

== Literature ==
- Witch Hunter (manhwa), a Korean manhwa series
- The Witch Hunter, a 2004 novel by Bernard Knight
- The Witch Hunters, a 1998 novel by Steve Lyons

== Other uses ==
- Witch Hunter (album), a 1985 album by Grave Digger
- The Witch Hunter, a 1993 album by Shinjuku Thief
- The Witch Hunter, a song by Insomnium from the album Anno 1696
- Witch Hunter: The Invisible World, a 2007 role-playing game

== See also ==
- Witch hunt (disambiguation)
- Witch trial (disambiguation)
- Witchfinder (disambiguation)
- Witchfinder General (disambiguation)
