= Witchfinder General (disambiguation) =

Witchfinder General was the self-styled title of English witch hunter Matthew Hopkins (c. 1620–1647).

Witchfinder General may also refer to:

- Witchfinder General (band), an English heavy metal band
  - "Witchfinder General", a song by Witchfinder General from the 1982 album Death Penalty
- Witchfinder General (novel), a 1966 novel by Ronald Bassett
  - Witchfinder General (film), a 1968 British film based on the novel
- "Witchfinder General", a song by Saxon from the 2004 album Lionheart
- A sketch in the TV series Sorry, I've Got No Head
- Tamacti Jun, a fictional character in the TV series See
- "Witchfinder General", a song by Carl Douglas from the 1974 album Kung Fu Fighting and Other Great Love Songs

== See also ==
- Witch hunt (disambiguation)
- Witch hunter (disambiguation)
- Witch trial (disambiguation)
- Witchfinder (disambiguation)
