= Kate McAll =

Executive producer of radio drama at BBC Wales

Kate McAll is an executive producer of radio drama at BBC Wales. There she is a radio director and producer for BBC Radio 3 and Radio 4. Her credits include How I Live Now (Radio 3) and The Worst Journey in the World (Radio 4), along with seven Torchwood radio episodes.

== Radio Plays ==
Radio Plays Directed or Produced by Kate McAll
Date first broadcast	Play	Author	Cast	Synopsis Awards	Station Series
28 July 2008	Goldengrove	Frances Byrnes	Jill Balcon, Jessica Jolleys, Siriol Jenkins, Beccy Alexander and Brendan Charleson	Story of the relationship between a young working-class girl and the woman who transforms her. Margaret, a spinster, teaches Narn, a city child, how to shake hands firmly, polish silver and identify birds. Most of all, she teaches her how to speak.	BBC Radio 4 Afternoon Play
21 November 2009	The Great Tennessee Monkey Trial	Adapted from the original trial transcript by Peter Goodchild	Neil Patrick Harris and Ed Asner	In 1925 this was one of the most unusual trials ever seen in a United States courtroom. Counsel for the Prosecution was three-time Democratic candidate William Jennings Bryan, a Christian Fundamentalist. For the defence was Chicago lawyer, and declared agnostic, Clarence Darrow, who had recently saved two brutal child killers from the death penalty. Earlier that year Tennessee had passed a law forbidding the teaching of evolution. In the stifling heat of July 24-year-old teacher John Scopes stood trial.	BBC Radio 4 Saturday Play
14 March 2011	The Gun Goes to Hollywood	Mike Walker	Steven Weber, Greg Itzin, Kate Steele, Jonathan Silverman, Jonathan Getz, Andre Sogliuzzo and Tom Virtue	Imagines the behind-the-scenes ructions from the notoriously troubled set of The Pride and the Passion, Hollywood's 1957 adaptation of The Gun, by C S Forester. Frank Sinatra left the production early because of marriage difficulties with Ava Gardner, and Cary Grant, then 53, fell in love with his co-star Sophia Loren, 23.	BBC Radio 4 Afternoon Play

Sources:

- Kate McAll's radio play listing at Diversity website
- Kate McAll's radio play listing at RadioListings website
