= Cedric the Forester =

Book by Bernard Marshall

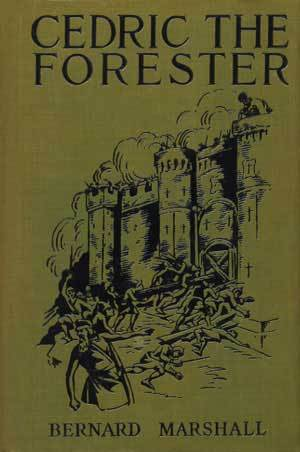
- Hardcover first edition cover
- Author: Bernard Marshall
- Illustrator: Bernard Marshall
- Language: English
- Genre: History
- Publisher: D. Appleton & Company
- Publication date: December 1921
- Publication place: United States
- Media type: Hardback
- Pages: 279

Cedric the Forester is a children's historical novel by Bernard Marshall which follows Cedric, a young boy in 13th century England, as he ascends to knighthood after saving a nobleman. It was published in 1921 and was a Newbery Honor recipient in 1922.

== Plot ==
Narrated by Sir Dickon Mountjoy, a twelfth-century Norman nobleman, the novel describes his lifelong friendship with Cedric of Pelham Wood, a Saxon yeoman. Cedric the forester saves Sir Dickon's life and is made his squire. The two men become friends and have many adventures. Cedric eventually becomes the best crossbowman in England and is knighted. Much of the novel is set in the time of King Richard the Lion Hearted, but in the final chapter, Cedric plays a pivotal role in the signing of Magna Carta.
