= Richard the Lionheart (2013 film) =

Richard The Lionheart
- Directed by: Stefano Milla
- Written by: Gero Giglio; Stefano Milla
- Screenplay by: Gero Giglio
- Produced by: Phil Gorn; Stefano Milla; Blinov Oleg Adrianovich
- Starring: Malcolm McDowell; Stewart Arnold; Veronica Calilli; Greg Maness; Maurizio Corigliano; Davide Ferricchio; Sharon Fryer; Christopher Jones; Daniele Lucca; Alice Lussiana Parente; Burton Perez; Umberto Procopio; Thomas Tinker; Carrion Yudith; Andrea Zirio
- Cinematography: Luca Grivet Brancot; Gary Rohan
- Edited by: Stefano Milla
- Music by: Giovanni Lodigiani
- Production companies: Claang Entertainment; DOMA Entertainment; WonderPhil Productions
- Distributed by: Grindstone Entertainment Group; Lionsgate Home Entertainment; New Select; WonderPhil Productions thefyzz
- Release dates: February 9, 2013 (Germany); January 8, 2014 (Japan); January 21, 2014 (United States)
- Running time: 104 minutes
- Countries: United States; Italy
- Language: English

Richard The Lionheart is a 2013 film, starring Greg Maness as Richard the Lionheart, Malcolm McDowell as King Henry II and Andrea Zirio as Henry the Young.

== Synopsis ==
While the war threatens with France, King Henry II decides to evaluate the courage of his son Richard the Lionheart, his possible successor. To do this, the King decided to place him into a mysterious castle, where Richard will have to face several trials.

== Cast ==
- Greg Maness as Richard the Lionheart
- Malcolm McDowell as King Henry II
- Stewart Arnold as Selector
- Veronica Calilli as Celtic Goddess
- Maurizio Corigliano as Barbarian
- Davide Ferricchio as Forgotten
- Sharon Fryer as Celtic Goddess (voice)
- Christopher Jones as One Eye
- Daniele Lucca as The Messenger
- Alice Lussiana Parente as Girl
- Burton Perez as Basileus
- Umberto Procopio as Caesar
- Thomas Tinker as Philippe
- Carrion Yudith as Ghaliya
- Andrea Zirio as Henry the Young

== Production ==
The film was directed by Stefano Milla and stars Greg Maness, Burton Anthony Perez, and Malcolm McDowell. According to the generic film, Richard the Lionheart was shot in different places : the fortress of Exilles, built in the 12th century, Casaforte di Chianocco, built in the 12th century (Italy). Some interiors are reconstituted in a Californian studio.

== See also ==
- Cultural depictions of Henry II of England
- Cultural depictions of Henry the Young King
- Cultural depictions of Richard I of England
