= Alpha and Omega (radio plays) =

BBC radio plays

Alpha and Omega are two radio plays written by Mike Walker, first broadcast on the BBC World Service in 2001 and 2002 respectively, and later on BBC Radio 4 and BBC 7. The plays address religious and philosophical issues like the existence of God, and the question of what separates humans from robotic automata.

Alpha won the Best Radio Drama Award in the 2001 Sony Radio Awards. Omega won two Worldplay awards in 2002, for Best Script and Best Production.

Both plays star David Calder as the lead actor, featured music composed and played by David Chiltern, and were produced by Gordon House.

== Alpha ==
=== Themes ===
Alpha examines issues of artificial intelligence from the viewpoint of established Christian teaching on the soul and human existence in the world. It addresses the existence of God and whether humans have free will or are nothing more than human automata.

=== Plot ===
The main character in Alpha is a priest employed by the Vatican as a sort of troubleshooter.

An all-knowing computer appears to have an independent life of its own - an abomination for those who believe in a supreme creator. Father Marquez is sent to interrogate ‘Alpha’ to decide whether or not it can be allowed to exist. During their conversations, Marquez finds out far more than he expects about both Alpha and - much more disturbingly - himself.

== Omega ==
=== Themes ===
Omega, focuses on belief in God and in miracles, contrasting these issues with the central character's belief in structure and reality. It addresses the question of what separates human beings from automata.

=== Plot ===
The central character of Omega is a civil engineer whose daughter has miraculously survived a car crash, and who comes to question his very existence.

It tells the story of John Stone, who is building the world’s tallest tower rising above London. He discovers God after his daughter makes a miraculous recovery from a car crash. But did a miracle really take place? Perhaps John's whole life is a fiction and he's merely the plaything of a group of controlling scientists.
