= The Witch Hunter =

2004 novel by Bernard Knight

- Author: Bernard Knight
- Series: Crowner John Mysteries
- Publication date: 5 April 2004
- Preceded by: Fear in the Forest
- Followed by: Figure of Hate

The Witch Hunter is a novel by Bernard Knight and the eighth book in his Crowner John Mysteries series. It was published in 2004 and like other books in the series, it is set in 12th century Exeter.

== Plot summary ==
The novel sees Devon's first county coroner, Sir John de Wolfe, investigating the sudden death of a wealthy guild-master and, although he is convinced the death has natural causes, the victim's widow is convinced that her husband has been done to death by an evil spell. Unsatisfied by Sir John's efforts, she embarks on a campaign to rid the region of its 'cunning women' leading to a hysteria (foreshadowing later witch-hunts, such as the European Inquisitions and the Salem witch trials) in which a number of women are persecuted and even executed.

When the Crowner's Welsh mistress Nesta is accused, Sir John is forced to step up his investigations to catch the culprits before she too faces the noose.
