= The Pride and the Passion =

1957 film by Stanley Kramer

- Theatrical release poster
- Directed by: Stanley Kramer
- Screenplay by: Edna Anhalt; Edward Anhalt
- Based on: The Gun; 1933 novel by C.S. Forester
- Produced by: Stanley Kramer
- Starring: Cary Grant; Frank Sinatra; Sophia Loren
- Cinematography: Franz Planer
- Edited by: Frederic Knudtson; Ellsworth Hoagland
- Music by: George Antheil
- Production company: Stanley Kramer Pictures
- Distributed by: United Artists
- Release dates: July 10, 1957 (U.S.); December 19, 1957 (Sweden); December 20, 1957 (Finland); February 2, 1959
- Running time: 132 minutes
- Country: United States
- Language: English
- Budget: $3.7 million
- Box office: $3.5 million (US rentals)

The Pride and the Passion is a 1957 American Napoleonic-era war film in Technicolor and VistaVision from United Artists, produced and directed by Stanley Kramer, starring Cary Grant, Frank Sinatra, and Sophia Loren. The film co-stars Theodore Bikel and Jay Novello.

The film's storyline concerns a British Royal Navy artillery officer who has orders to retrieve a huge siege cannon from Spain and transport it by ship to British forces. First, however, the leader of the Spanish guerrillas wants to transport the weapon 1,000 km (620 mi) across Spain to help in the recapture of the city of Ávila from the occupying French before he releases it to the British. Most of the film deals with the hardships of transporting the large cannon to Ávila across rivers and over mountains, while also evading the occupying French forces that have been ordered to find it. A sub-plot concerns the struggle for the love of the Spanish woman Juana (Loren) by the two male protagonists.

The film story and screenplay by Edna Anhalt and Edward Anhalt are loosely based on the 1933 novel The Gun by C. S. Forester. Earl Felton contributed an uncredited screenplay re-write, George Antheil composed the music score, and Saul Bass designed the opening title sequence.

The film's music score was the last important work by George Antheil, once famous as the "bad boy of music" in the 1920s. It is the only one of Antheil's many film scores to have been preserved on a commercial soundtrack recording.

== Plot ==
During the Peninsular War, Napoleon's armies overrun Spain. An enormous siege cannon, belonging to the Spanish army, is abandoned when it slows down the army's retreat. French cavalrymen are dispatched to find it.

Britain, Spain's ally, sends a Royal Navy ordnance officer, Captain Anthony Trumbull, to find the huge cannon and see that it is handed over to British forces before it can be retrieved by the French. However, when Trumbull arrives at the Spanish headquarters, he finds that it has been evacuated and is now occupied by a guerrilla band led by the French-hating Miguel. Miguel shows Trumbull the abandoned cannon's location at the bottom of a steep ravine. He says he will only help move the huge gun if it is first used against the fortified walls of Ávila, which Miguel is obsessed with capturing. During their association, the two men grow to dislike each other. One cause of their enmity is Miguel's mistress, Juana, who falls in love with Trumbull.

Meanwhile, sadistic General Jouvet, the French commander of the French forces in Ávila, orders the execution of 10 Spanish hostages daily until information on the cannon's whereabouts is surrendered. The cannon has, in fact, been recovered and undergoes an arduous journey across Spain toward Ávila.

The guerrilla band, whose ranks have swelled considerably, almost lose the cannon when General Jouvet deploys artillery at a mountain pass that they must use to get to Ávila. With help from the local populace, the band gets the cannon through, despite heavy losses, although it rolls down a long hillside and is damaged, becoming partially dismounted from its transport carriage.

The cannon is moved and hidden inside a cathedral while it is repaired. Afterwards, it is disguised as an ornamental processional platform during a Catholic Holy Week religious procession in order to move it past the occupying French. French officers, however, are informed of the cannon's cathedral location, but by the time they arrive, it has been repaired and moved, leaving no trace that it was ever there.

When the cannon finally arrives at the guerrillas' camp on the plains outside Ávila, Trumbull and Miguel prepare to attack the city. However, Ávila is defended by strong walls, eighty cannon and a garrison of French troops. Trumbull explains to the assembled guerilla force that half their number will be killed by various types of French artillery shot and grouped rifle fire during their assault wave. Later, he tries to convince Juana not to participate in the battle, but, having come so far, the next day she goes with the men.

Trumbull repeatedly fires the huge siege cannon, its large solid shot slowly demolishing one section of Ávila's high walls. Despite suffering heavy losses as they charge forward, the guerrillas pour through the city's breached wall and overwhelm the French forces. General Jouvet is killed, and the last French troops are overrun and killed in the town square. After the battle, Trumbull bids farewell to a dying Juana and then places Miguel's dead body at the foot of the statue of Ávila's patron saint Saint Teresa. After securing the huge cannon for its long journey to England, Trumbull leaves Ávila with troubled memories of his adventures across Spain.

== Cast ==
- Cary Grant as Capt. Anthony Trumbull
- Frank Sinatra as Miguel
- Sophia Loren as Juana
- Theodore Bikel as General Henri Jouvet
- John Wengraf as Sermaine
- Jay Novello as Ballinger
- Jose Nieto as Carlos
- Carlos Larranaga as Jose
- Philip Van Zandt as Vidal
- Paco el Laberinto as Manolo

== Production ==
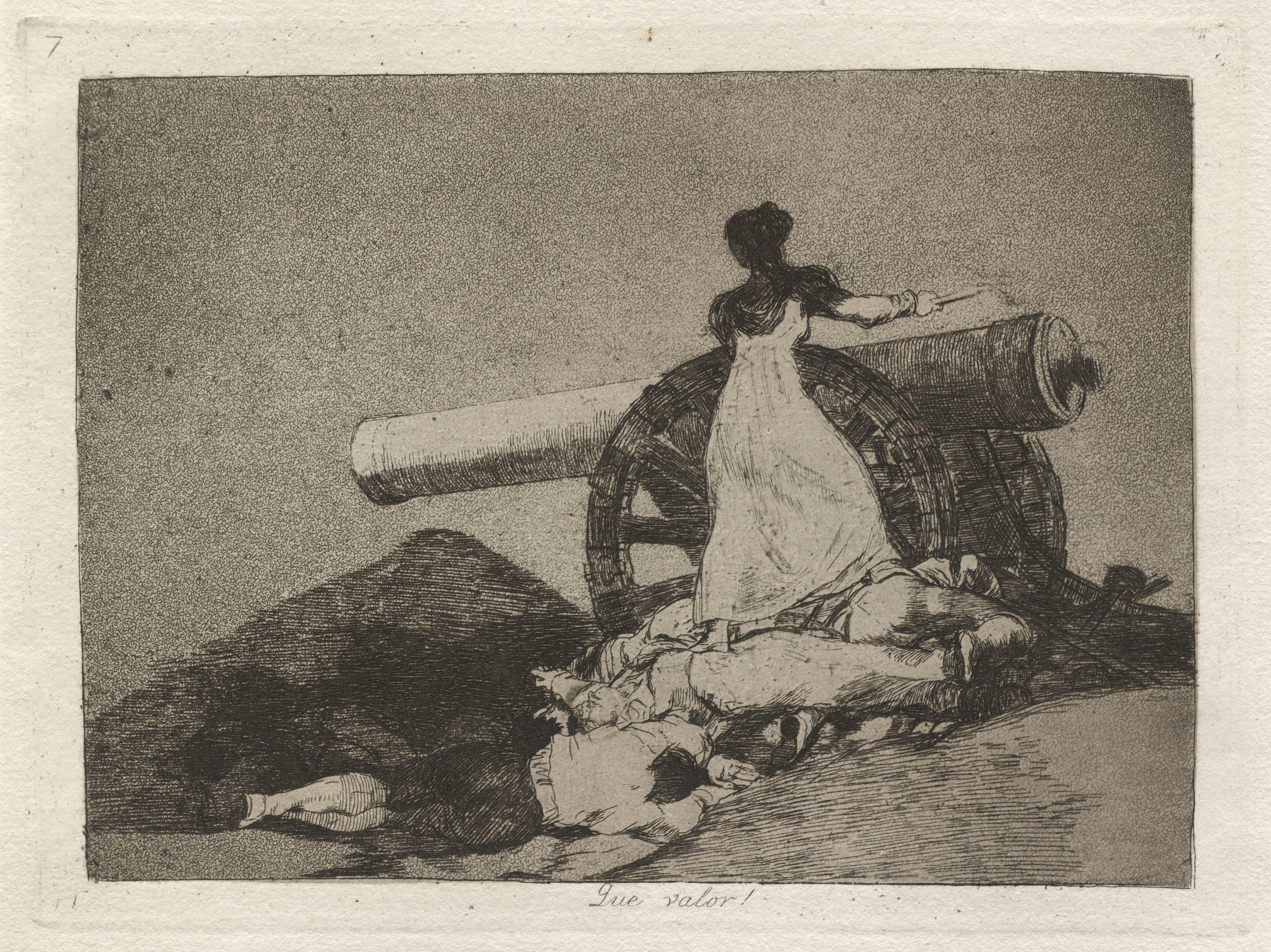
The title credits by Saul Bass are based on Francisco de Goya's print series The Disasters of War, such as this What Courage!.

The film was shot on location in Spain amid persistent rumors that Sinatra took his part only to be near his wife, Ava Gardner, with whom he was having marital problems. Gardner was away from Sinatra for her role in The Sun Also Rises (1957), which was being shot in various locales around Europe, including Spain. When he realized there was to be no reconciliation, Sinatra hurriedly left the production, asking director Stanley Kramer to condense his scenes into a more abbreviated shooting schedule; Kramer obliged. Conversely, Cary Grant was pleased to be away from his troubled marriage to Betsy Drake and pursued a serious romance with co-star Sophia Loren, but Loren went on to marry her mentor and agent Carlo Ponti later that year. They would remain together until his death in 2007.

Despite the film's production difficulties, Kramer was nominated by the Directors Guild of America for Outstanding Directorial Achievement.

On March 14, 2011, BBC Radio 4's Afternoon Play broadcast The Gun Goes to Hollywood by Mike Walker, which imagined the behind-the-scenes drama of the Kramer production, including Sinatra leaving the production early and Grant falling in love with co-star Loren. The play was staged from the viewpoint of script doctor Earl Felton, who had been drafted to save the day. The play was directed by Kate McAll, and the cast included Steven Weber as Earl Felton, Gregory Itzin as Cary Grant, Kate Steele as Sophia Loren, Jonathan Silverman as Frank Sinatra and Jonathan Getz as Stanley Kramer.

The cannon appears to have been based on the Jaivana Cannon, a real prototype from Jaipur, India, which still exists. It is one of the largest cannons ever constructed.

The color of Captain Turnbull's naval uniform appears more intended to show off Technicolor than to depict any historical British Navy Blue, which is much darker. This color choice brings his jacket very close to the French enemy's blue uniform color.

== Reception ==
Opening to mixed reviews on July 10, 1957, The Pride and The Passion was successful, spurred by the popularity of the leading actors. With US rentals of $3.5 million, from a gross of $8.75 million, and worldwide rentals of $6.7 million, it was one of the 20 highest-grossing films of 1957. However, high production costs caused the film to lose $2.5 million.

Variety praised the film's production values, saying "Top credit must go to the production. The panoramic, long-range views of the marching and terribly burdened army, the painful fight to keep the gun mobile through ravine and over waterway – these are major pluses." In 1998, Author Ephraim Katz described the film as "overblown empty epic nonsense."

Isabel Quigly reviewed the film for The Spectator on October 18, 1957: “With Stanley Kramer producing and directing, two such interesting actors as Frank Sinatra and Sophia Loren, a first-rate story (from C. S. Forester's The Gun), and some magnificent Spanish scenery, The Pride and the Passion might have been, and should have been, something very much better than it is. It ought to have been at least exciting, which it isn't. The fault lies mainly with three things: the script, Cary Grant, and the music. The script wins the year's prize for fatuity, Mr. Grant plays an English naval officer with the alarmed rigidity of an inexperienced sword- swallower, and the music bellows almost without pause from start to finish….Parts of this mostly dogged and long-winded film are impressive, mostly those where the landscape is allowed to take over…”

On review aggregator Rotten Tomatoes, 30% of ten critics gave the film a positive review, with an average rating of 4.8/10.

== Comic book adaptation ==
- Dell Four Color #824 (August 1957)

== See also ==
- Jaivana Cannon
- List of American films of 1957
- Tsar Cannon
- List of the largest cannon by caliber
