= Witchfinder =

A Witchfinder is a person who seeks witches in a witch-hunt.

Witchfinder may also refer to:

- "I, The Witchfinder", a song by Electric Wizard from the 2000 album Dopethrone
- The Witchfinder (TV series), a British television series
- "The Witchfinder", an episode of Merlin
- "The Witchfinder", a song by Amorphous Androgynous from the 2005 album Alice in Ultraland
- "The Witchfinders", an episode of Doctor Who

== See also ==
- Witch hunter (disambiguation)
- Witchfinder General (disambiguation)
