= Witch trial (disambiguation) =

A witch trial is a legal proceeding that is part of a witch-hunt.

Witch trial may also refer to:

- Salem witch trials, a series of hearings and prosecutions of people accused of witchcraft in colonial Massachusetts between February 1692 and May 1693
- "Witch Trial" (Charmed), an episode from Charmed season two
- The Witch Trials, an electropunk musical group (1980–1981)
- Witch Trial (game), a card game

== See also ==
- Witch hunt (disambiguation)
- Witch hunter (disambiguation)
- Witchfinder General (disambiguation)
- Category:Witch trials
