= Witch hunt (disambiguation) =

A witch hunt is a search for suspected or alleged witches. It is also used as a metaphor for investigation with real purpose of harming opponents.

Witch hunt may also refer to:

== Film ==
- The Witch Hunt, a 1981 Norwegian film
- Witch Hunt (1994 film), a television film
- Witch Hunt (1999 film), a film starring Jacqueline Bisset
- Witch Hunt (2008 film), a documentary about the Kern County child abuse cases
- Witch Hunt (2019 film), a documentary about the campaign against anti-semitism in the UK Labour Party
- Witch Hunt (2021 film), a fantasy-horror film featuring actress Gideon Adlon

== Television ==
- "Witch Hunt" (Legends of Tomorrow), an episode of Legends of Tomorrow
- "Witch Hunt" (NCIS), an episode of NCIS
- Witch Hunt (Once Upon a Time), an episode of Once Upon a Time
- "Witch Hunt" (Trinity Blood), an episode of Trinity Blood
- Witch Hunt (South Korean TV series), a South Korean TV series
- Witch Hunt (UK TV series), a 1967 British series

== Music ==
- Witch Hunt (band), a punk band from Philadelphia
- "Witch Hunt" (song), by Rush on their 1981 album Moving Pictures
- "Witch Hunt", a song by MDFMK from their self-titled album
- "Witch Hunt", a song by the Misfits from Famous Monsters
- "Witch Hunt", a composition by Wayne Shorter from Speak No Evil
- Witch-Hunts, a 1998 album by Darkwoods My Betrothed
- "Witch Hunt", a song by Jack Off Jill from Clear Hearts Grey Flowers
- "Witch Hunt", a song by Tarja from The Brightest Void
- "Witch Hunt", a song by Testament from Para Bellum

== Other uses ==
- Witch Hunt (novel), a 1993 novel by Ian Rankin writing as Jack Harvey
- Witch Hunt (role-playing game), a 1983 role-playing game
- Witch-Hunt, a translation group for the visual novel game Umineko no Naku Koro ni

== See also ==
- Witch hunter (disambiguation)
- Witch trial (disambiguation)
