= The Gun (novel) =

1933 historical novel by C. S. Forester

- First edition
- Author: C.S. Forester
- Language: English
- Genre: Historical fiction
- Publisher: The Bodley Head
- Publication date: 1933

The Gun is a novel by C.S. Forester about an imaginary series of incidents involving a single eighteen-pounder cannon during the Peninsular War (1807–1814). The book was first published in 1933 and has as its background the brutal war of liberation of Spanish and Portuguese forces (regular and partisans) and their British allies against the occupying armies of Napoleonic France.

== Plot ==
As the story begins, the titular huge bronze cannon is abandoned by the remnants of a regular Spanish army retreating after their defeat in the Battle of Espinosa. The local people wish to employ it in their resistance against the French, but are eventually forced to hide it away beneath a pile of stone to prevent its capture. Years later, a group of guerrilleros learn of its location and conscript the locals to outfit it with carriage and train. Over time, the gun is used in battle with ever-increasing success. It falls under the control of a series of guerrilla leaders; each achieves strong leadership through his connection to the gun, and each is eventually killed in some way (captured and executed, killed in battle, killed by rival leaders), until the gun finally comes under the control of the 18-year-old Jorge, who emerges as an untrained but naturally gifted leader and tactician. The exploits of the Spanish irregulars under Jorge eventually lead to the diversion of a large body of elite French troops from reinforcing the army opposing the Peninsular allies under the Duke of Wellington. The loose alliance of guerrilleros are scattered but the ultimate defeat of the French invaders is now in sight. The gun is destroyed but has changed history.

The book vividly portrays the violence of combat and the brutality displayed by both sides in the Peninsular War.

== Adaptations ==
- The novel was adapted into the large budget feature film The Pride and the Passion (1957), starring Cary Grant, Frank Sinatra, and Sophia Loren.
- It was adapted for radio by Mike Walker on 12 March 2011 and broadcast on BBC Radio 4's Saturday Play program. The cast included Scott Arthur as Jorge, Matthew Gravelle as El Balbanito, Keiron Self as Isadore, Don Gilet as Carlos O'Neill, Kevin Doyle as Father Bernard, Sule Rimmi as Duke Alonso and Richard Nicholls as Urquiola.
