= Bernard Marshall =

American children's writer, historical novelist

Bernard Gay Marshall
- Born: August 23, 1875; North Easton, Massachusetts, US
- Died: December 14, 1945 (aged 70)
- Occupations: Writer, editor
- Writing career
- Genres: Adventure fiction, historical fiction, children's literature (mainly for boys)
- Notable work: Cedric the Forester

Bernard G. Marshall (August 23, 1875 – December 14, 1945) was an American writer. His historical novel Cedric the Forester was one runner-up for the inaugural Newbery Medal in 1922.

== Life ==
Bernard Gay Marshall was born to Francis F. and Helen F. Doten Marshall in North Easton, Massachusetts, where he later attended high school. Wanting to be a writer, he "thought he could play in orchestras and make a living until he had a foothold as an author". He subsequently worked as a musician, legal stenographer, an advertising and technical writer, and as a ship builder during World War I. In July 1903 Marshall married Ida M. Conklin. The couple had one daughter, Harriet C.

Marshall wrote five historical fiction novels, romantic adventure stories set in great periods of the Anglo-Saxon struggle for freedom." The books are set in time periods ranging from the England of King Arthur to Andrew Jackson's United States. He also wrote short stories and articles for magazines, including Sunset, Boys' Life, St. Nicholas, Munsey's Magazine, The American Magazine and The American Boy. (Note: Marshall may have sometimes used the pen name Robert Wingate.) In addition, he wrote for technical magazines and edited several trade journals. By 1921 Marshall had moved to Berkeley, California, where he was a member of the San Francisco chapter of the Writer's Dinner Club.

Bernard Gay Marshall died Dec. 14, 1945.

== Critical reception ==
As a writer of historical fiction, Marshall's books were compared to Walter Scott's in length and desrciptive details, though another added that to call Cedric the Forester a second Ivanhoe was "a mistake", adding "Bernard Marshall has done a good piece of work, but he is not Sir Walter".

Marshall's novels were widely read, and reviewed for both children and adults. His first book, Cedric the Forester, received one of the inaugural Newbery Honor awards in 1922, for "the most distinguished contribution to American literature for children". (Note: This was not the last time the Newbery honored a book originally published for adults. Parravano, "Alive and Vigorous", The Horn Book, July/August 1999.) The American Boy issued part of his first book under the title "Churl and Overlord". The Unitarian Register Cedric the Forester referred to it as well written and informative, and the scouting magazine Boys' Life frequently reviewed his novels for its young readers.

Marshall's novels were also well received by adults. Walter of Tiverton received a star from The Bookman, which reviewed it as a book for adults, as did The Outlook, calling it a "spirited romance". The Saturday Review praised Redcoat and the Minuteman for the "clean, clear simplicity of his narrative", saying the plot was "skilfully handled".

== Books ==
Marshall's five books were all historical novels published by D. Appleton & Company. The first four were illustrated by J. Scott Williams.

- Cedric the Forester, illus. J.S. Williams, D. Appleton, 1921, 318 pages

When Saxon yeoman Cedric of Pellham Woods saves the life of Norman nobleman Dickon Mountjoy, he is made a squire, and a friendship begins between the two. Eventually Cedric becomes the best crossbowman in England, and is knighted. He then becomes instrumental in the establishment of Magna Carta. The frequency of deaths in Cedric the Forester sometimes drew criticism.

In 1922 Marshall was one runner-up for the inaugural Newbery Medal from the professional librarians, recognizing the previous year's "most distinguished contribution to American literature for children". Members of the American Library Association were asked to nominate a book and Cedric the Forester was one of six that received at least two votes; five were subsequently designated runners-up. Runner-up works are now called Newbery Honor Books, so latterday editions are authorized to display a silver seal on the cover.

- Walter of Tiverton, illus. J.S. Williams, Appleton, 1923, 263 pages

Two young knights, Walter of Tiverton and Sir Boris Delamar, find adventure in England during the time of Richard the Lionheart. They are often helped by the mysterious Knight of Ascalon, who always disappears before they can thank him.

- The Torch Bearers: A Tale of Cavalier Days, illus. J.S. Williams, Appleton, 1923, 317 pages

Myles Delaroche, a descendant of Cedric the Forester, is an English Puritan, though his friend Arthur Hinsdale is a Royalist. The two men find their friendship tested by the English Civil War. The story portrays both sides of the struggle with understanding and sympathy. At one point Delaroche "saw that no peace would be durable, on whatever victories founded, if those who triumphed sought to impose their sway upon the nation and to forbid all forms of worship save their own." Eventually Delaroche leaves England for the United States, allowing the series to continue there.

- Redcoat and Minuteman, illus. J.S. Williams, Appleton, 1924, 277 pages

Set during the American Revolution, this book tells the story of another Delaroche, Richard, who leaves Harvard to join the intelligence branch of the Minutemen. Delaroche encounters George Washington and Friedrich Wilhelm von Steuben, is mistaken for a loyalist, and takes part in the Battle of Bunker Hill.

- Old Hickory's Prisoner: A Tale of the Second War for Independence, Appleton, 1925, 254 pages

The United States is now involved in the War of 1812 and Hubert Delaroche is too young to join the army, so he volunteers as a messenger. He is present as Commodore Decatur attempts to run a British blockade. They don't succeed, and Delaroche is forced to escape through the Cumberland Mountains to Tennessee, where he joins Andrew Jackson's army, and makes a new friend, a Shawnee named Blue Feather.
