= Crowner John Mysteries =

The Crowner John Mysteries are a series of novels by Bernard Knight following the fictional life of Sir John de Wolfe, a former Crusading knight appointed to the office of Keeper of the Pleas of the King's Crown (custos placitorum coronas), i.e. the King's Crowner or Coroner, for the county of Devon.

Crowners were appointed in 1194, during the reign of Richard the Lionheart, in every county to check on the corruption of sheriffs, but also to raise as much money as possible towards the payment of the loans that covered the huge ransom after the king's capture in Austria on his return from the Third Crusade.

As Crowner, Sir John must investigate all sudden deaths, murders, rapes, assaults, fires, wrecks and catches of royal fish. He is also expected to increase custom (through fines and taking of property owned by convicted criminals) to the royal treasury, instead of the old manor and shire courts. Throughout the series, Sir John is assisted by Gwyn, his old Cornish retainer, and Thomas de Peyne, an unfrocked priest, who is his clerk.

In Crowner Royal, set in 1196, John is appointed the first Coroner of the Verge by the king. He returns to Exeter in late 1196 in the next novel, A Plague of Heretics.

== Historical Accuracy ==
Apart from John, many of the main characters are real historical figures and the depiction of twelfth-century England is heavily influenced by Knight's own research into the time period. Most of the places described in the stories are real locations that can be visited by readers today, including John's office in the gatehouse of Rougemont Castle in Exeter.

== Novels in the Crowner John Series ==
1. The Sanctuary Seeker (1998), set in November 1194
2. The Poisoned Chalice (1998), set in December 1194
3. Crowner's Quest (1999), set in Christmas 1194
4. The Awful Secret (2000), set in March 1195
5. The Tinner's Corpse (2001), set in April 1195
6. The Grim Reaper (2002), set in May 1195
7. Fear In The Forest (2003), set in June 1195
8. The Witch Hunter (2004), set in August 1195
9. Figure of Hate (2005), set in October 1195
10. The Elixir of Death (2006), set in November 1195
11. The Noble Outlaw (2007), set in December 1195
12. The Manor of Death (2008), set in April 1196
13. Crowner Royal (2009), set in Summer 1196
14. A Plague of Heretics (2010), set in November 1196
15. Crowner's Crusade (2012), actually a prequel to the series, taking place chronologically before The Sanctuary Seeker

== Short stories featuring Crowner John ==
Crowner John appears in a series of books formed of linked stories written by Philip Gooden, Susanna Gregory, Michael Jecks, Bernard Knight and Ian Morson under the common pseudonym of the Medieval Murderers:

- The Tainted Relic (2005)
- Sword of Shame (2006)
- House of Shadows (2007)
- The Lost Prophecies (2008)
