= Graham Shelby =

Graham Shelby (18 September 1939 – 20 December 2016) was a British historical novelist. He worked as a copywriter and book-reviewer before embarking on a series of historical novels, several of which are set in the twelfth century.

== List of works ==
- The Knights of Dark Renown (1969), set in the Kingdom of Jerusalem during the reigns of Baldwin IV, Baldwin V and Queen Sibylla, majoring on the real-life knights Balian of Ibelin, Raynald of Châtillon and their arch-enemy Saladin.
- The Kings of Vain Intent (1970), sequel to the above, dealing with the Third Crusade, depicting Conrad of Montferrat as the villain: the US edition contains an additional chapter.
- The Villains of the Piece (1972) (published in the US as The Oath and the Sword), is set in an England racked by anarchy and civil war. It tells of the conflict between King Stephen and Empress Matilda.
- The Devil is Loose (1973), is about a rise to power of Richard the Lionheart and his brother John, with the King of France playing off one against the other. And the great model of chivalry, William Marshal who remained unswervingly loyal to each of the Angevin kings.
- The Wolf at the Door (1975), a sequel to the above, following the fortunes and misfortunes of King John, and the continuing story of William Marshal.
- The Cannaways (1978), First of two books about a fictional family of 18th century coach builders in Wiltshire, tells of the picaresque adventures of Brydd Cannaway and his travels through Europe to Vienna.
- The Cannaway Concern (1980), a sequel to the above, following the story of Brydd's daughter, Charlotte, and her involvement with the dashing sea captain, Matcham Lodge, and the Jacobites.
- The Edge of the Blade (1986). A fictional story about Baynard Falkan and his travels to the Holy Land at the time of the Third Crusade to deliver treasure to the Cause, and win the hand of the beautiful Christiane de Magnat-Vaulmier.
- Demand the World (1990), The true story of Elisa Lynch who escaped poverty and the ravages of the Irish famine to become the mistress of Latin America's most powerful dictator, Solano Lopez.
- Columbus (1970) Written under the name of James Gant. A novelised biography of the famous explorer.
- The Besieged (1972) Also under the name of James Gant, tells the story of Jewish resistance to the yoke of Rome, culminating in the siege and massacre at Masada in AD 72.
- New Blood (1981) Under the name of Richard Salem, a horror story set in the US where an apparently peaceful rural town hides a hideous secret.

== Translations ==
The Knights of Dark Renown and The Kings of Vain Intent were translated into German as Ritter der Finsternis in 1975, and The Devil is Loose and The Wolf at the Door as Der ertrinkende Eber in 1980.

All four novels were translated into Hungarian as Sötét lovagok; Hiú királyok and A Sátán széttörte láncát; Farkas a kertek alatt in 1983.

The Edge of the Blade was translated into Hungarian as A penge éle in 1991.

Demand the World was translated into Spanish as El Fuego de una Vida in 1992.

New Blood was translated into Hungarian, appearing as a 5-part serial in Rakéta Magazine, Budapest in 1985 as Friss vér.

Blood Let (by Richard Salem) was unpublished in English, but appeared in Hungarian as a 4-part serial in Rakéta Magazine, Budapest in 1989 as Kiontott vér.
