= Bernard Knight =

British forensic pathologist and writer (born 1931)

Professor Bernard Knight CBE
- Born: 3 May 1931 (age 95); Cardiff, Wales
- Occupations: Doctor and Lawyer
- Writing career
- Genre: Crime Fiction
- Notable awards: Commander of the Order of the British Empire

Bernard Henry Knight CBE (born 3 May 1931) is a Welsh forensic pathologist and writer. He became a Home Office pathologist in 1965 and was appointed Professor of Forensic Pathology, University of Wales College of Medicine, in 1980.

== Early life ==
Knight was born on 3 May 1931 in Cardiff, Wales. Upon failing to gain a place to study agriculture, he began work at the Cardiff Royal Infirmary as a lab technician. He studied medicine at the Welsh National School of Medicine, University of Wales. He graduated in 1954 Bachelor of Medicine, Bachelor of Surgery.

== Career ==
=== Military service ===
As part of National Service, Knight was commissioned into the Royal Army Medical Corps on 3 September 1956 as a lieutenant. On 12 September 1956, he transferred from the National Service List to the Regular Army and was given seniority in the rank of lieutenant from 29 August 1955. He was promoted to captain on 12 September 1956 with seniority from 29 August 1956. He served as a medical officer in Malaya during the Malayan Emergency.

On 12 September 1959, he transferred to the Regular Army Reserve of Officers, signalling the end of his military service. He ceased to belong to the reserve on 12 September 1964.

=== Medical and legal career ===
Having graduated in 1954, Knight became a pre-registration house officer. He undertook one six-month job in medicine and one in surgery. He was then a Senior House Officer specialising in pathology from 1955 to 1956. He served in the British Army as a medical officer specialising in pathology from 1956 to 1959.

Upon returning to the United Kingdom and leaving the army, he began lecturing. From 1959 to 1962, he was a lecturer in forensic medicine at the University of London. He was a senior lecturer at the University of Newcastle from 1965 to 1968, during which time he also became a barrister. He then returned to his alma mater, the University of Wales, as a senior lecturer. He was promoted to reader in 1976 and to Professor of Forensic Pathology in 1980. He retired in 1996 becoming Emeritus Professor of the university.

He served as a Home Office pathologist from 1965 to 1996. In his thirty-one years in that role, he conducted over 25,000 autopsies. He was involved in a number of high-profile cases, including that of the serial killers Fred and Rosemary West, and the first use of DNA to confirm the identity of a body, that of Karen Price in 1989.

=== Author ===
He has been writing since before 1963, when his first crime novel was published. Since then, he has written about thirty books, including contemporary crime fiction, historical novels about Wales, biography, non-fiction popular works on forensic medicine, twelve medico-legal textbooks and the Crowner John Mysteries series of 12th-century historical mysteries featuring one of the earliest (fictional) coroners in England.

In addition, he has written scripts for radio and television dramas and documentaries, including the forensic series The Expert starring Marius Goring, in the 1970s. He has contributed to many other textbooks and has edited several medical journals - he was Managing Editor of Elsevier's Forensic Science International, the leading international publication in the field.

He is a founder member of The Medieval Murderers, a select group of historical crime-writers within the Crime Writers' Association, who give presentations at literary festivals, libraries and bookshops, to promote their work amongst the public. He is also one of the non-fiction judges for the annual 'Dagger' Awards of the Crime Writers' Association and a regular reviewer of crime books for the Internet site Tangled Web.

== Honours and decorations ==
In the 1993 Queen's Birthday Honours, Knight was appointed Commander of the Order of the British Empire (CBE). He received the General Service Medal with Malaya clasp for his service during the Malayan Emergency.

== Bibliography ==
=== Wye Valley Series / Dr Richard Pryor ===
- Where Death Delights (2010)
- According to the Evidence (2010)
- Grounds for Appeal (2011)

=== Tom Howden Series ===
- Dead in the Dog (2012)

=== Other ===
- Lion Rampant (1972)
- Madoc (1977)
- Brennan (2003)

=== Novels written under pseudonym Bernard Picton ===
1. The Lately Deceased (1963)
2. The Thread of Evidence (1965)
3. Mistress Murder (1966)
4. Russian Roulette (1968)
5. Policeman's Progress (1969)
6. Tiger at Bay (1970)
7. The Expert (1976)

=== Non-Fiction ===
- Murder, Suicide, or Accident: The Forensic Pathologist at Work (1971) (published under pseudonym Bernard Picton)
