= Mike Walker (radio dramatist) =

Radio dramatist

Mike Walker is a radio dramatist and feature and documentary writer. His radio work includes both original plays and adaptations of novels, classical and modern. He has won Sony Radio Awards for his play Alpha (2001) and for his script for Different States (1991), and a Silver Community Award for Oxford Road on BBC Radio Berkshire, as well the British Writers' Guild award for best dramatisation for his 1996 adaptation of The Tin Drum by Günter Grass. He was also part of the writing team for BBC Radio 4's The Dark House, which won a BAFTA Interactive Award.

He won the 2012 Bronze Sony Radio Academy Award for Best Drama with A Tale of Two Cities.

== Works ==
His plays include:

- for BBC World Service – Alpha, Omega, Tide Race
- for BBC Radio 3 – Babel's Tower, Darger and the Detective
- for BBC Radio 4 – D Day Project, The Dark House, Uncertainty, The Patrick Nicholls Story, Buried By Glass, Three Divided By Two, Silvertown, The Making of Napoleon, Act or Die, The Sound of Fury, Orphans, Something Happened, Texas and the Poppy Fields, Different States, Caesar! (three series of plays about the rulers of Rome [2003–2007]), Plantagenet (three series of plays about the Plantagenet kings of England [2010–2012]), Spitfire!, Tsar (three series of plays about the rulers of Russia from Ivan IV to Vladimir Putin), The Gun Goes to Hollywood, Landfall and The Stuarts (a series of plays about The House of Stuart, from Mary, Queen of Scots to Charlotte Stuart [2013–2015]).

His adaptations include:

- War and Peace (BBC Radio 4 Classic Serial, 1997)
- Nicholas Nickleby (BBC Radio 4, 1999)
- The Tin Drum (BBC Radio 4 Classic Serial, 2000)
- Crime and Punishment (BBC Radio 4 Classic Serial, 2000)
- The African Queen (BBC Radio 4, 2001)
- Neuromancer (BBC World Service Drama, 2002)
- The Old Curiosity Shop (BBC Radio 4 Woman's Hour Drama, 2002)
- Who Goes There? (BBC Radio 4, 2002)
- I Have No Mouth, and I Must Scream (BBC Radio 4, 2002)
- The Old Curiosity Shop (BBC Radio 4 Woman's Hour Drama, 2002)
- A Day in the Life of Ivan Denisovich (BBC Radio 4 Classic Serial, 2003)
- The Woman in Black (BBC Radio 4 Saturday Play, 2004)
- The IPCRESS File (BBC Radio 4 Saturday Play, 2004)
- David Copperfield (BBC Radio 4 Woman's Hour Drama, 2005)
- Dombey and Son (BBC Radio 4 Woman's Hour Drama, 2007)
- The Veldt (BBC Radio 4 Afternoon Play, 2007)
- On The Beach (BBC Radio 4 Classic Serial, 2008)
- Rendezvous with Rama (BBC Radio 4 Classic Serial, 2009)
- The Gun (BBC Radio 4 Afternoon Play, 2011)
- Our Mutual Friend, (BBC Radio 4 Woman's Hour Drama, 2010)
- A Tale of Two Cities (BBC Radio 4 Afternoon Play, 2011)
- Life and Fate (BBC Radio 4, 2011)
- The Man Who Would Be King (BBC Radio 4, 2018)
- Stalingrad (BBC Radio 4, 2019)
- The Mystery of Edwin Drood (BBC Radio 4, 2020)
- It Can't Happen Here (BBC Radio 4, 2024)

Radio plays written by Mike Walker
Date first broadcast	Play	Director	Cast	Synopsis Awards	Station Series
8 September 1990 (Recorded on 17 May 1990)	True Believers	David Greenwood	Dhirendra Kumar, Meera Syal and Elizabeth Mansfield	'Tony' has turned his back on his Sikh family and married an English girl. But his brother's activities threaten to destroy his happiness.	BBC Radio 4 Saturday Night Theatre
19 September 1990 (recorded on 18 April 1990)	Something Happened	Jeremy Mortimer	Ben Onwukwe, Diana Bishop, Jonathan Firth, Mmoloki Chrystie, Kelda Holmes, Lizzie McInnerny and Trevor Nicholls	How does a family recover from the kidnapping of a child, and how does the child cope?	BBC Radio 4
30 September 1996	American Faith	Ned Chaillet	Alan Marriott, Colin Stinton, William Roberts, William Dufris, John Sharian, Kate Harper, Ed Bishop, Garrick Hagon, Bob Sherman, Tara Hugo, Morgan Deare, Steven Crossley, Norman Chancer and William Hootkins	Richard Milhous Nixon's road to Watergate.	BBC Radio 4
6 July 1998 – 10 July 1998	What's Inside a Girl? (Note: Based on the original story by Michele Hanson)	Marilyn Imrie	Paola Dionisotti, Edna Doré and Luisa Bradshaw-White	Gillian and her friends tackle middle age head-on – with varying degrees of damage – as they wrestle with VPL and HRT.	BBC Radio 4 Woman's Hour Drama
26 March 1999	J Edgar Hoover: Red Scare	Ned Chaillet	William Hootkins, Bob Sherman, Kate Harper and Patrick Allen	The 24-year-old Hoover is assigned the task of overseeing America's first campaign against domestic communism.	BBC Radio 4 Afternoon Play
2 April 1999	J Edgar Hoover: Public Enemy	Ned Chaillet	William Hootkins, Michael Neill, John Guerrasio, William Roberts, Mac MacDonald, Adam Sims and Dave Brooks	Hoover sheds his younger self and moves into the orbit of Walter Winchell, America's radio pundit, as they wage war against gangsters, creating and destroying heroes.	BBC Radio 4 Afternoon Play
9 April 1999	J Edgar Hoover: They Call Him Bobby	Ned Chaillet	William Hootkins and John Sharian	A powerful duologue for US Attorney General Robert F. Kennedy and J Edgar Hoover. It is set in the volatile years of the Kennedy administration, when civil rights, Martin Luther King Jr. and the war against the American Mafia were high on the Kennedy agenda.	BBC Radio 4 Afternoon Play
16 April 1999	J Edgar Hoover: Private and Confidential	Ned Chaillet	William Hootkins and David Soul	J Edgar Hoover's life is reviewed by his lifelong companion and assistant director, Clyde Tolson.	BBC Radio 4 Afternoon Play
11 September 2010	Spitfire!	Amber Barnfather	Rory Kinnear, Joe Coen, Samuel West, Samuel Barnett, David Horovitch, David Troughton, Stephen Critchlow, Ben Crowe, Lucas Motion, Abigail Thaw and Ruth Wilson	Traces RJ Mitchell's design from creation to legend and the fortunes of two young pilots who join a frontline Spitfire squadron just as the Battle of Britain begins. Framed by recollections from veteran Geoffrey Wellum, the drama features specially made recordings of Battle of Britain Memorial Flight Spitfires. First broadcast in September 2010 to mark the 70th anniversary of the Battle of Britain.	BBC Radio 4 Saturday Play
14 March 2011	The Gun Goes to Hollywood	Kate McAll	Steven Weber, Greg Itzin, Kate Steele, Jonathan Silverman, Jonathan Getz, Andre Sogliuzzo and Tom Virtue	Imagines the behind-the-scenes ructions from the notoriously troubled set of The Pride and the Passion, Hollywood's 1957 adaptation of The Gun, by C S Forester. Frank Sinatra left the production early because of marriage difficulties with Ava Gardner, and Cary Grant, then 53, fell in love with his co-star Sophia Loren, 23.	BBC Radio 4 Afternoon Play
16 December 2011	Beyond Borders	Dirk Maggs	Timothy West, Lesley Manville, Daniel Weyman, Philip Jackson, Simon Jones and William Hope	1950, Jean Monnet is charged with planning the reconstruction of France after the Second World War. Monnet's vision is for a radical realignment of Europe, not by one nation asserting itself over another, but by negotiation, integration and ultimately, through political and economic unification.	BBC Radio 4 Afternoon Play
Radio plays adapted by Mike Walker
25 October 1999 – 3 December 1999	Nicholas Nickleby (Note: Dramatised by Mike Walker and Georgia Pritchett)	Marilyn Imrie and Jeremy Mortimer	Oliver Milburn, Alex Jennings, Nicola Radcliffe, Ken Campbell, Anna Massey, Richard Johnson, Tom Baker and David Bamber	The story is of Nicholas's triumph against adversity: he defeats his wicked Uncle Ralph and the loathsome Squeers to carve out a life for himself, his family and the pitiful boy, Smike. Eventually he wins the hand of a beautiful girl, Madeline Bray.	BBC Radio 4 Woman's Hour Drama
14 December 1999	Alphabox	Ned Chaillet	Conrad Nelson, Gemma Saunders, Beth Chalmers, Harry Myers, Christopher Kellem, Tom George and Rosie Cavillero	Alphabox is a mysterious and almost fairytale-like short story based on letters and their relationship to story-telling. In the book, a writer has his letters hand-delivered to him each day one by one, in a mysterious wooden box.	BBC Radio 4 Afternoon Play
22 December 2000	The Tunnel Under the World	Ned Chaillet	William Hope, Bob Sherman, Laurel Lefkow and Beth Chalmers	Guy wakes each morning from the same terrifying dream, but each day it is soothed away by special offers and an abundance of consumer goods. Then, one day, he begins to recall a little more.	BBC Radio 4 Afternoon Play
29 December 2000	The League of Gentlemen	Toby Swift	Jonathan Coy, Raymond Coulthard and Adam Kotz	A decade after the end of the Second World War, ex-major Gregory Hemmings recruits a team of disgraced former army officers to undertake a daring raid on a central London bank.	BBC Radio 4 Friday Play
14 January 2002	Philomel Cottage	Jeremy Mortimer	Lizzie McInnerny, Tom Hollander, Adam Godley and Struan Rodger	When Alex meets Terry she is swept off her feet. He persuades her to leave her job and set up a business with him.	BBC Radio 4
24 January 2002	Who Goes There?	Rachel Horan	Liam Brennan, Ioan Meredith, Cyril Nri, Christopher Godwin, Harry Myers and Colin Adrian	Six men are trapped by a vicious snowstorm in an Antarctic research station.	BBC Radio 4 Chillers
28 January 2002	Swan Song	Ned Chaillet	Maria Friedman, Emily Woof, Sylvester Morand and Ray Lonnen	As if from nowhere, a soprano has emerged to become the Tosca of our day – but like Tosca she carries in her heart a terrible need for revenge.	BBC Radio 4
31 January 2002	I Have No Mouth, and I Must Scream	Ned Chaillet	David Soul, Harlan Ellison, Abi Eniola, Ewan Bailey, David Timson and Jason O'Mara	After a computer wins mankind's last war, there is a final battle still to come, between it and the five surviving humans.	BBC Radio 4 Chillers
4 February 2002	Magnolia Blossom	Ned Chaillet	Emilia Fox, Julian Rhind-Tutt, Alex Jennings and Ewan Bailey	A woman's place is definitely not in the luxury home created for her by her financier husband. But in times of trouble a woman's loyalty can challenge the presumption of men – and infidelity can be a small crime compared to others.	BBC Radio 4
7 February 2002	Delta Sly Honey	Ned Chaillet	Corey Johnson, Robert Petkoff, Sam Douglas and Ben Onwukwe	A country boy exorcises his demons in Vietnam by making late-night broadcasts to phantom military units – until one of them answers his call.	BBC Radio 4 Chillers
14 February 2002	Corona	Rachel Horan	Josie Kook-Clarke, Walter Lewis, Doña Croll, John Moraitis, William Roberts and Bill Bailey	When a telepathic girl and a damaged young man are hospitalised, their two minds become entwined as the nightmares of his brutal past draw her in.	BBC Radio 4 Chillers
24 February 2003	In a Glass Darkly	Ned Chaillet	Neil Dudgeon and Rebecca Egan	In a mirror, a man witnesses a murderous attack on a young woman just before he meets the woman and falls in love with her.	BBC Radio 4
10 March 2003	The Dressmaker's Doll	Ned Chaillet	Juliet Aubrey, Beth Chalmers, Stephen Critchlow, Gemma Saunders, Emma Woolliams and Connie Gurie	When a doll with a mind of its own comes into your life, it might be worth finding out what it wants. Agatha Christie for the 21st century is no less chilling for moving to the driving rhythms of London's cat-walks in the cut-throat world of today's fashion.	BBC Radio 4
17 March 2003	The Case of the Perfect Carer retitled from The Case of the Perfect Maid	Jeremy Mortimer	Richenda Carey, Joanna Monro, Carla Simpson, Richard Firth and Joan O'Norman (Note: Joan O'Norman was included in the cast credits but is an anagram of Joanna Monro used to conceal one "character" being a disguise)	Renting a flat to elderly sisters in a converted dower house should be a simple job for an estate agent, but Kate finds Bernice anything but easy. Then valuables start to disappear.	BBC Radio 4
6 April 2003	One Day in the Life of Ivan Denisovich	Ned Chaillet	Neil Dudgeon, Philip Jackson, Paul Chan, Jonathan Tafler, Ben Onwukwe, Bruce Purchase, Matthew Morgan, Marty Rea, Stephen Critchlow, Ben Crowe, Seun Shote and Peter Darney	When Solzhenitsyn's shattering picture of Stalin's prison camps became an international best-seller in 1962, it seemed to signal a thaw in the Cold War. But Solzhenitsyn was a prophet about to be dishonoured in his own land, and the uncensored version of the novel did not appear until 1991 – the year after Solzhenitsyn's citizenship was restored in Russia. Following the routine of a single day in the camps, the story is a dynamic demonstration of human resilience.	BBC Radio 4 The Saturday Play
17 January 2004	The Ipcress File	Toby Swift	Ian Hart, James Laurenson, Jonathan Coy, Fenella Woolgar, Peter Marinker, Jamie Bamber, Kerry Shale, Adam Tedder, Rachel Atkins, John Sharian, Raad Rawi and Declan Wilson	Len Deighton's gripping cold war thriller became a popular icon of British cinema. Mike Walker's dramatisation re-discovers the novel and its unnamed and defiantly non-establishment narrator as his new job in the intelligence service ensnares him in a plot to brainwash scientists and trade them across the iron curtain.	BBC Radio 4 Saturday Play
5 June 2004	The Long Wait (Note: Written by Sarah Daniels based on a story by Mike Walker)	Toby Swift		In Normandy on 5 June 1944, Nicole is getting ready to go out with her German boyfriend, despite the nightly air raids. A German army band is throwing a jazz concert in a hall in Caen when the singer, Mitzi, is called away on urgent business by Father Pierre. He is the blind, elderly padre who realises that his cover as a double agent has been blown, just as coded messages are coming through to the French resistance that the invasion is about to happen.	BBC Radio 4
5 December 2005 – 30 December 2005	David Copperfield	Jeremy Mortimer and Mary Peate	Robert Glenister, Michael Legge, Gerard McDermott, Deborah Findlay, Colleen Prendergast, Susan Jameson, Amy Marston, Harry Myers, Paul Bradley, Richard Firth, Geoffrey Whitehead, Adrian Scarborough, Shaun Dingwall, Diana Quick, Eve Best, Emily Wachter, Flaminia Cinque, Nicholas Le Prevost, Alex Tregear, Carl Prekopp, Geoffrey Streatfield, Joanne Froggatt, Helen Longworth, Selina Griffith and Steven Williams	A new dramatisation of the semi-autobiographical novel which Dickens called "his favourite child".	BBC Radio 4 Woman's Hour Drama
18 February 2007	Hooligan Nights	Toby Swift	James Daley, Pamela Banks, Stephen Greif, Carl Prekopp, Gerard Horan, Freddy White, Gerard McDermott, Jamie Borthwick, David O'Dell, Sam Dale, Bethan Walker, Paul Richard Biggin, Joseph Kloska, Emma Noakes and Saikat Ahamed	The brutal world of London gangland in the 1890s is brought vividly to life in an innovative new musical created by writer Mike Walker and composer Mike Woolmans. Loosely based on the book by Clarence Rook, it recounts the criminal career of Alf, a self-styled Lambeth hooligan.	BBC Radio 3 Drama on 3
2 November 2008 – 9 November 2008	On The Beach	Toby Swift	Richard Dillane, Claudia Harrison, William Hope, Indira Varma, James Gordon-Mitchell, Jonathan Tafler, Inam Mirza, Stephen Critchlow, Chris Pavlo, Dan Starkey, Jill Cardo, Robert Lonsdale and Gunnar Cauthery	In the aftermath of a nuclear war, a deadly radioactive cloud is moving slowly towards Australia, one of few places on Earth where life still exists.	BBC Radio 4 Classic Serial
22 August 2010 – 29 August 2010	No Highway	Toby Swift	William Beck, Alison Pettitt, Paul Ritter, Naomi Frederick, Fenella Woolgar, Lauren Mote, Tony Bell, William Hope, Jude Akuwudike, Sean Baker, Sam Dale, Michael Shelford, David Seddon and Christine Kavanagh	1948. The future of Britain's transatlantic aviation industry rests on the success of a new plane – the Rutland Reindeer. One has crashed already and an eccentric government scientist believes more will follow. The race is on to prove his theory before Reindeers start to fell from the sky.	BBC Radio 4 Classic Serial
26 December 2011 – 30 December 2011	A Tale of Two Cities	Jessica Dromgoole and Jeremy Mortimer	Robert Lindsay, Jonathan Coy, Alison Steadman, Karl Johnson, Lydia Wilson, Andrew Scott, Paul Ready, James Lailey, Tracy Wiles, Simon Bubb, Carl Prekopp, Adjoa Andoh, Daniel Cooper, Clive Merrison, Gerard McDermott, Paul Moriarty, Christopher Webster, Adam Billington, Rikki Lawton and Alex Rivers	Set in London and Paris before and during the French Revolution, these five episodes show the plight of the French people under the brutal oppression of the aristocracy in the years leading up to the revolution, and the corresponding savage brutality of the revolutionaries toward the former aristocrats in the years immediately following. Won the Bronze Sony Radio Academy Award for Best Drama in 2012.	BBC Radio 4 Afternoon Play
