= Plantagenet (radio plays) =

Plantagenet is a three-series sequence of BBC Radio 4 radio plays by the British dramatist Mike Walker, broadcast in the Classic Serial strand, based on the account of the Plantagenet dynasty in Holinshed's Chronicles. Each series consisted of three weekly episodes, the first premiering from 14 February 2010, the second from 29 May 2011 and the third from 1 April 2012.

== Episode list ==
=== Series 1 ===
==== Henry II – What is A Man? ====
- King Henry II – David Warner
- Queen Eleanor – Jane Lapotaire
- Prince Richard – Joseph Cohen-Cole
- Prince Hal – Piers Wehner
- Prince Geoffrey – Rhys Jennings
- William Marshall – Stephen Hogan
- Bertran de Bourne – Bruce Alexander
- King Louis – Philip Fox
- Courtier – John Biggins

==== Richard I – Lionheart ====
- Queen Eleanor – Jane Lapotaire
- Richard – Ed Stoppard
- King Henry II – David Warner
- William Marshall – Stephen Hogan
- King Philip – John Biggins
- Saladin – Raad Rawi
- El-adel – Khalid Laith
- Baldwin – Ewan Hooper
- Prince John, later King John – Neil Stuke
- Hugh – Philip Fox
- Robert of Champagne – Rhys Jennings
- Conrad – Piers Wehner

==== John, by the Grace of God ====
- Queen Eleanor – Jane Lapotaire
- King Richard – Ed Stoppard
- King John – Neil Stuke
- William Marshall – Stephen Hogan
- Prince Arthur – Ryan Watson
- Queen Isabelle – Emerald O'Hanrahan
- King Philip – John Biggins
- Saladin – Raad Rawi
- El-Adel – Khalid Laith
- Doctor/Langton – Ewan Hooper
- Girard – Joseph Cohen-Cole
- De Roche – Bruce Alexander
- Fitzwalter – Piers Wehner
- Will Marshall – Rhys Jennings
- Prince Henry, later Henry III – Bertie Gilbert

=== Series 2 ===
==== Edward I – Old Soldiers ====
- King Edward I – Philip Jackson
- Margaret, Edward's second wife – Ellie Kendrick
- Ned, later King Edward II – Sam Troughton
- Piers Gaveston – Simon Bubb
- William Wallace – James Lailey
- Roger Bigod – Jonathan Forbes

==== Edward II – The Greatest Traitor ====
- King Edward II – Sam Troughton
- Isabella, Edward's wife and Mortimer's lover – Hattie Morahan
- Roger Mortimer – Trystan Gravelle
- Prince Edward, later King Edward III – Joseph Samrai
- Hugh Despenser – Jonathan Forbes

==== Richard II – And All Our Dreams Will End in Death ====
- King Richard II, Edward III's grandson and heir – Patrick Kennedy
- Henry Bolingbroke – Blake Ritson
- Queen Ann – Alex Tregear
- Gloucester – Peter Polycarpou
- John of Gaunt – Sean Baker

=== Series 3 ===
==== Henry V – True Believers ====
- Hal, later King Henry V ...Luke Treadaway
- Katherine of France, Henry V's wife...Lydia Leonard
- Thomas of Earlham...James Lailey
- Sir John Oldcastle...Nicky Henson
- King Henry IV...Paul Moriarty
- Badby...Simon Bubb
- Bradmore...Carl Prekopp

==== Henry VI – A Simple Man ====
- King Henry VI...Al Weaver
- Margaret...Aimee-Ffion Edwards
- Richard, Duke of York... Shaun Dooley
- Cardinal Beaufort...Paul Moriarty
- Earl of Warwick...Gerard McDermott
- Duke of Somerset...Carl Prekopp
- Edward of York...Simon Bubb

==== Richard III – The Three Brothers ====
- Queen Elizabeth Woodville, wife of Edward IV...Nancy Carroll
- King Edward IV...Simon Bubb
- King Richard III...Carl Prekopp
- Clarence...Christopher Webster
- Margaret, widow of Henry VI...Aimee Ffion Edwards
- Warwick...Gerard McDermott
- Stafford...Adam Billington
- Lewis...James Lailey
- Bishop...Paul Moriarty
