= List of Merlin characters =

This is a list of characters in the BBC fantasy drama television series Merlin.
Note: All characters, including main and recurring characters, are listed in alphabetical order by their first name.

= Main cast (credited)
= Recurring cast (4+)
= Guest cast (1-3)

| Character | Portrayed by | Series | | | | |
| Character | Portrayed by | Series 1 (2008) | Series 2 (2009) | Series 3 (2010) | Series 4 (2011) | Series 5 (2012) |
Main
| Merlin | Colin Morgan | Main | Main | Main | Main | Main |
| Guinevere | Angel Coulby | Main | Main | Main | Main | Main |
| Arthur Pendragon | Bradley James | Main | Main | Main | Main | Main |
| Morgana Pendragon | Katie McGrath | Main | Main | Main | Main | Main |
| Uther Pendragon | Anthony Head | Main | Main | Main | Main | Guest |
| Gaius | Richard Wilson | Main | Main | Main | Main | Main |
| Agravaine de Bois | Nathaniel Parker | | | | Main | |
Recurring
| The Great Dragon Kilgharrah | John Hurt | Recurring | Recurring | Recurring | Recurring | Recurring |
| Geoffrey of Monmouth | Michael Cronin | Recurring | Recurring | Recurring | Recurring | |
| Hunith | Caroline Faber | Guest | | | Guest | |
| Nimueh | Michelle Ryan | Recurring | | | | |
| Tom | David Durham | Guest | | | | |
| Sir Gregory | Gary Oliver | Recurring | | | | |
| Morris | Ed Coleman | Recurring | | | | |
| Sir Lancelot | Santiago Cabrera | Guest | Guest | Guest | Guest | |
| Mordred | Asa Butterfield (child) | Guest | Guest | | | |
| Mordred | Alexander Vlahos (adult) | | | | | Recurring |
| Iseldir | Trevor Sellers | Guest | | Guest | Guest | |
| Sidhe Elder | Michael Jenn | Guest | | Guest | | |
| Sir Leon | Rupert Young | | Recurring | Recurring | Recurring | Recurring |
| Morgause | Emilia Fox | | Guest | Recurring | Guest | |
| Ygraine Pendragon | Alice Patten | | Guest | Guest | | |
| Freya | Laura Donnelly | | Guest | Guest | | |
| Balinor | John Lynch | | Guest | | | Guest |
| Sir Gwaine | Eoin Macken | | | Recurring | Recurring | Recurring |
| Sir Elyan | Adetomiwa Edun | | | Guest | Recurring | Recurring |
| Cenred | Tom Ellis | | | Recurring | | |
| Sir Percival | Tom Hopper | | | Guest | Recurring | Recurring |
| Audrey | Zee Asha | | | | Guest | Guest |
| Helios | Terence Maynard | | | | Guest | |
| Alator | Gary Lewis | | | | Guest | Guest |
| Queen Annis | Lindsay Duncan | | | | Guest | Guest |
| The Dorchraid | Maureen Carr | | | | Guest | Guest |
| Princess Mithian | Janet Montgomery | | | | Guest | Guest |
| Beroun | Barry Aird | | | | | Guest |

== A ==
=== Aglain ===
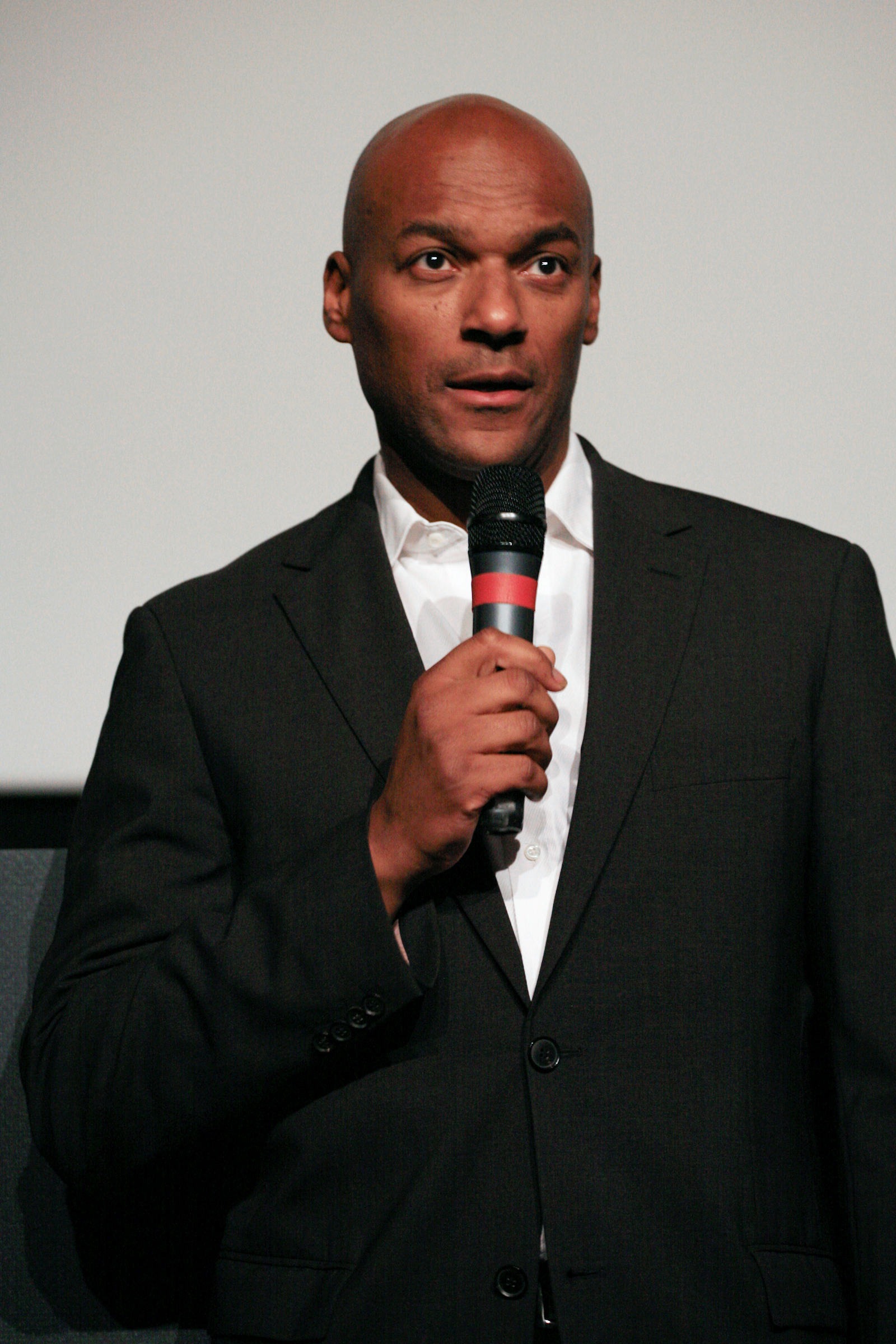
Colin Salmon

Aglain (portrayed by Colin Salmon) is a Druid man who resides in the Forest of Acestir. In the second-season episode, "The Nightmare Begins", he, with the assistance of Mordred, rescued Morgana from a group of serkets and later healed the injury she sustained from one of the creatures. While she resided with him and his fellow Druids, Aglain encouraged Morgana not to fear herself and her emerging abilities, telling her that magic was not evil and not something Uther should hate. When Arthur and his knights arrived in pursuit of Morgana, whom they thought had been kidnapped by the Druids, Aglain tried to help Morgana and Mordred flee with his people. However, in the process, he was shot dead by one of Arthur's men.

=== Agravaine de Bois ===
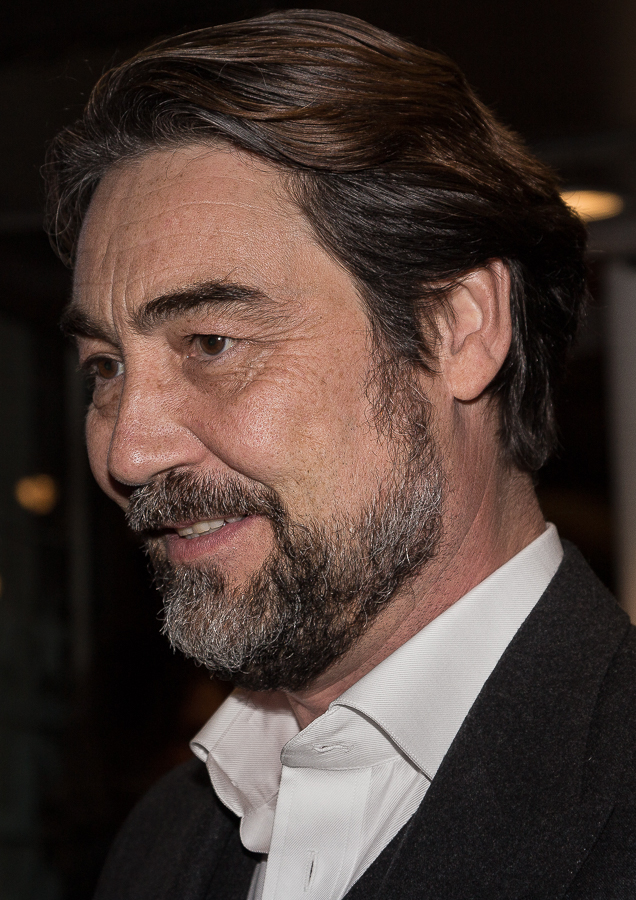
Nathaniel Parker

Agravaine de Bois (portrayed by Nathaniel Parker) was the brother of Ygraine and Tristan de Bois and the uncle of Arthur, who appeared in the fourth season. Though he was supposedly in Camelot to act as an advisor to Arthur, Agravaine was really there to help Morgana in her attempts to seize the throne. Holding Uther responsible for the deaths of his siblings, Agravaine placed a charmed necklace on the dying Uther's neck in "The Wicked Day" that would ultimately be responsible for the king's death in that episode.

Throughout the fourth season, Agravaine influences Arthur heavily in matters of state, even encouraging the young king to go against his instincts and wishes, such as killing the king of another kingdom who had been raiding inside Camelot's borders and distancing himself from Gwen in the episode, "His Father's Son." However, Morgana often has doubts about Agravaine's abilities throughout Season 4 and is often seen threatening him and he in return attempts to pacify her and assure Morgana of his abilities. Agravaine kept his cover as a seemingly loyal kinsman to Arthur until the penultimate episode, "The Sword and the Stone, Part One," when he cleared the way for Morgana and the warlord, Helios, to invade Camelot, even joining in the fighting during the battle. After Camelot was secured, Agravaine led a group of warriors in pursuit of Arthur and Merlin, who were fleeing to Ealdor. In the fourth-season finale, "The Sword in the Stone, Part Two," Agravaine was chased into a series of caves by Kilgharrah. He hunted Arthur in the tunnels but was baited into chasing Merlin toward a dead end. Here Merlin reveals his magic and throws aside Agravaine and his men. Agravaine survives the initial attack and realizes Merlin must be Emrys, the sorcerer Morgana has dreamt of. He laughs in shock and tries to deceive Merlin with words of praise so he can stab him, but Merlin sees through the ruse and kills Agravaine with a second attack.

=== Aithusa ===
Along with Kilgharrah the Great Dragon, Aithusa is the only other living dragon left in existence. She first appears in the episode "Aithusa" when, as an egg, she is rescued by Merlin from Jules Borden in the Tomb of Ashkanar. Due to his powers as a Dragonlord, Merlin is able to hatch her, and her status as a White Dragon is taken as a sign of good fortune by Kilgarragh. However, this changes when she heals Morgana in "The Sword in the Stone: Part 2". In "Arthur's Bane Part 2", she is revealed to have been imprisoned for two years with Morgana by Sarrum of Amata, and the trauma of the imprisonment was such that she is left unable to speak and walk with a noticeable limp. The episode "The Hollow Queen" also reveals that as Aithusa grew while imprisoned by Sarrum, the pit she and Morgana were housed in became too small for the growing dragon, and it caused her to become deformed, twisted, and stunted in her growth. She is revealed to be perhaps the only being Morgana cares for and is very much loyal to her. Morgana cares so much for Aithusa to the point where she willingly lets Sarrum imprison her to prevent harm from coming to Aithusa. She participates in attacking the forces of Camelot on several occasions in Season 5, and only Merlin's powers as Dragonlord prevent her from killing him and his allies. She also aids in forging Mordred's sword to aid him in killing Arthur. At the Battle of Camlann, she participates in the battle itself until Merlin drives her away, though her fate is unknown. Aithusa seems to be based on the white dragon that represented the Saxons in Arthurian legend and is noticeably small compared to Kilgarragh, only being as large as a wyvern at around 6 or 7 feet long. Her small size is, again, likely the result of her growth being stunted by imprisonment in Sarrum's dungeons for a long period of time.

=== Alator ===
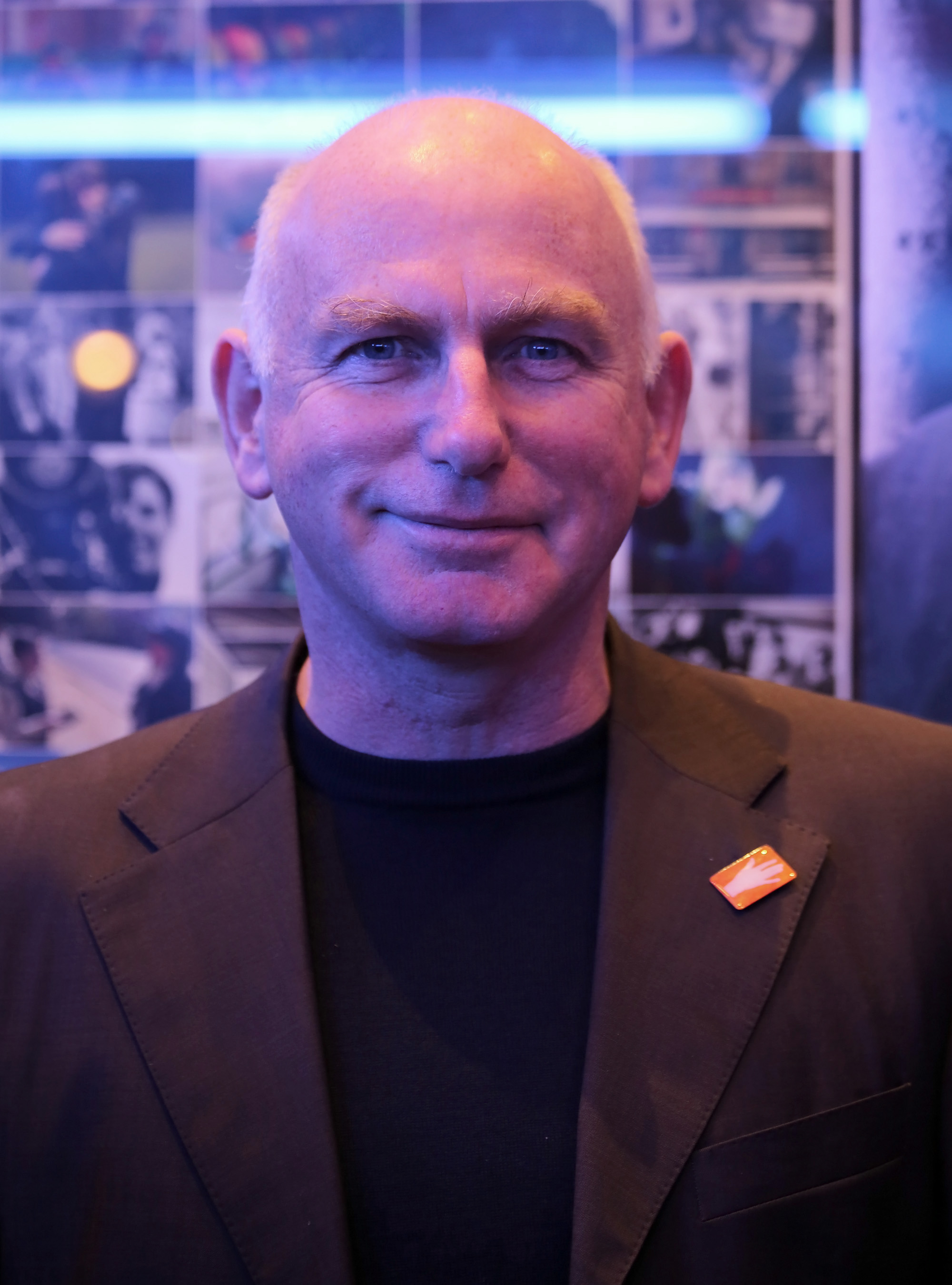
Gary Lewis

Alator, also known as Alator of the Catha. (portrayed by Gary Lewis) was an enigmatic, magical warrior and priest who briefly allied with Morgana in the episodes "The Secret Sharer" and "The Kindness of Strangers." In the episode "The Secret Sharer," seeking the true identity of Emrys, Morgana engaged his services in exchange for the healing bracelet Morgause had given her in the second season. Alator and his followers then kidnapped Gaius and proceeded to torture him for information about Emrys. When Gaius inevitably gave in and told Alator Emrys' true identity as well as the prophecies about him, Alator switched sides, rescuing Merlin from Morgana by knocking her out. After that, he tells Merlin that he knows Merlin's plans to make a better world and that he would gladly give his life for it. He did. Captured by Morgana three years later in the episode "The Kindness of Strangers," Alator refused to reveal Emrys' identity. Morgana used magic to break his neck, and the noble priest died. his servant, Finna, also dies protecting the identity of Emrys (Merlin).

=== Alice ===
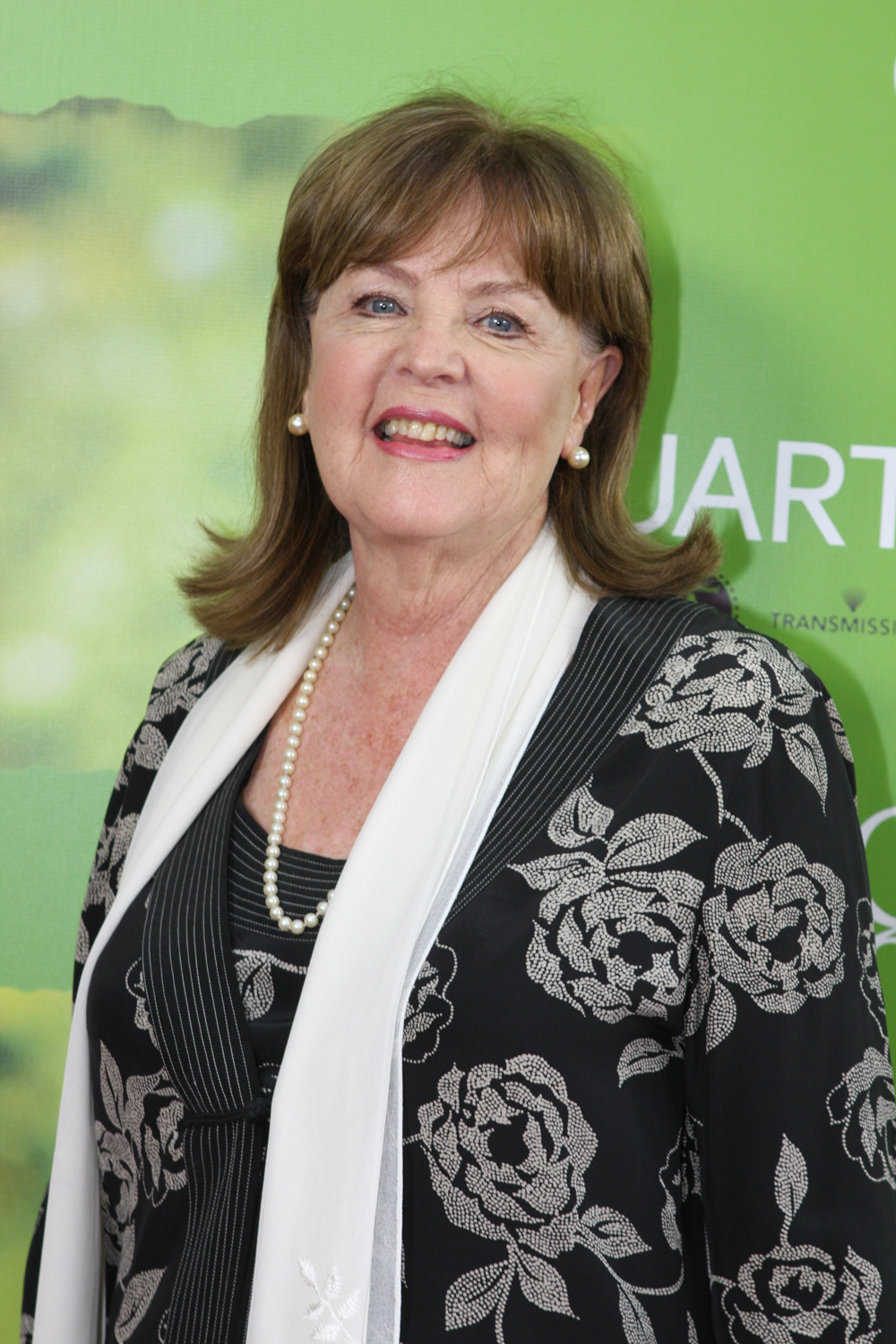
Pauline Collins

Alice (portrayed by Pauline Collins) is a sorceress who lived in Camelot before the Great Purge, possessing a great natural power with a specialty for healing spells. In the episode "Love in the Time of Dragons," it was revealed that she and Gaius were more than very close friends before the Great Purge due to their shared interests and were even engaged to be married. However, when the Great Purge began, Gaius was forced to help Alice flee Camelot by striking her name from Uther's lists and remaining behind to avoid drawing attention to his role in her escape.

In the episode, Alice returned to Camelot, supposedly hoping to see Gaius again. Although Gaius was happy to be reunited with her, Merlin soon discovered she was under the influence of a manticore, which Alice had summoned in the hope of using its dark magic for good. The manticore, however, had instead gained control of her and wished to use her relationship with Gaius to kill Uther. Despite the manticore's plan to poison the king succeeding, Merlin and Gaius were able to cure Uther by killing the manticore. Gaius subsequently helped Alice escape Camelot the night before her scheduled execution.

=== Anhora, Keeper of the Unicorns ===
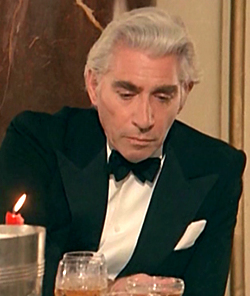
Frank Finlay

Anhora, Keeper of the Unicorns (portrayed by Frank Finlay) is the guardian of the unicorns. In the episode "The Labyrinth of Gedref," after Arthur kills a unicorn while hunting, Anhora informs him that he had unleashed a curse upon Camelot that could not be lifted unless Arthur makes amends. Anhora set a variety of 'tests' for the prince, the second of which Arthur failed when he 'killed' a thief for insulting his pride and honour.

After seeing Arthur's despondency, Merlin sought out Anhora and asked him to give the prince a second chance. Anhora instructed Arthur to go to the Labyrinth of Gedref. Arthur did so, with Merlin following behind him in secret. Anhora took that opportunity to kidnap Merlin, making the warlock part of Arthur's final test. When Arthur drank from a goblet that he thought was filled with poison, Anhora stated that because Arthur had been willing to sacrifice himself for Merlin, the curse would be lifted. Anhora later stated that when Arthur showed true remorse for killing the unicorn, proving himself pure of heart, the unicorn killed at the start of the episode was given a chance to live again.

=== Annis ===
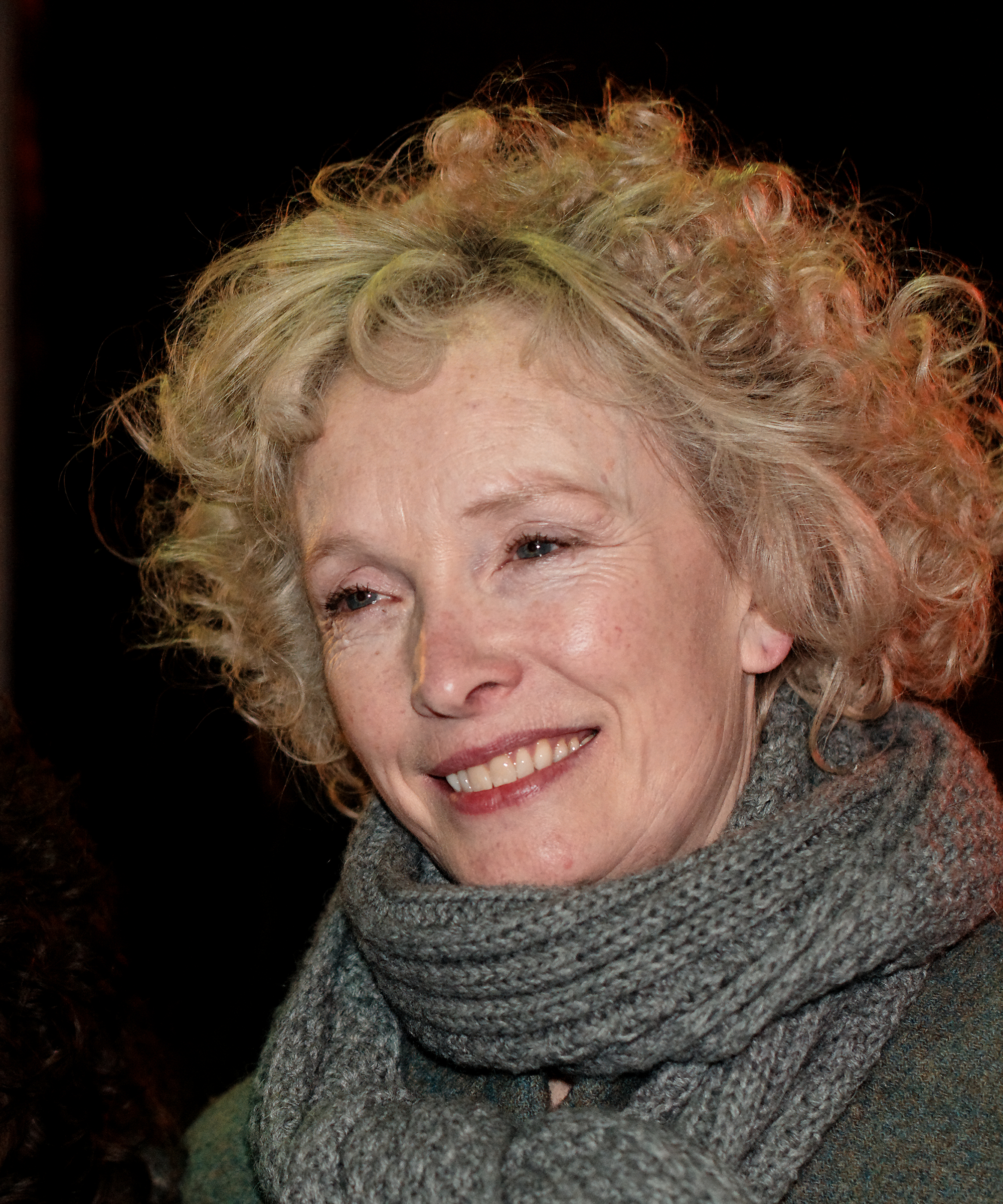
Lindsay Duncan

Queen Annis (portrayed by Lindsay Duncan) is the widow of King Caerleon. Annis is a fierce, strong, and courageous woman who, while grieving her husband's death, immediately rose in defiance to declare war on Caerleon's killer, Arthur Pendragon. She was seeking vengeance in her grief and had a strong sense of justice since she responded vehemently to what she saw as a crime on Arthur's part. However, Annis has also shown herself to be reasonable, rational, and wise. When Arthur came to her unarmed, she allowed him, despite her grief, to negotiate a single-combat match and leave her camp unharmed, thus sparing many lives on both sides. In addition, Annis is a fair and compassionate queen, sparing Merlin's life despite catching him spying and quickly forgiving Arthur's errors. Queen Annis proved to be an adept judge of character once she saw past her grief. She came to acknowledge Arthur's sense of justice and mercy despite his crime against Caerleon. She seemed to see Arthur in a good light and even glorified him by commenting that he brought hope to all of them. Annis also saw Morgana for what she was far more astutely than most, proclaiming that she was far more like her father than she would care to admit. Annis is ultimately a very just and fair woman, but also spontaneous and extreme in her actions, forgiving Arthur his misjudgment and homicide unusually quickly, withdrawing her army and restoring the peace contract that Uther originally signed with her father-in-law and refusing to cooperate further with Morgana. In Series 5, she gave Camelot's army safe passage through her lands in their mission to find a missing garrison so they could surprise the Saxons in league with Morgana.

=== Aredian ===
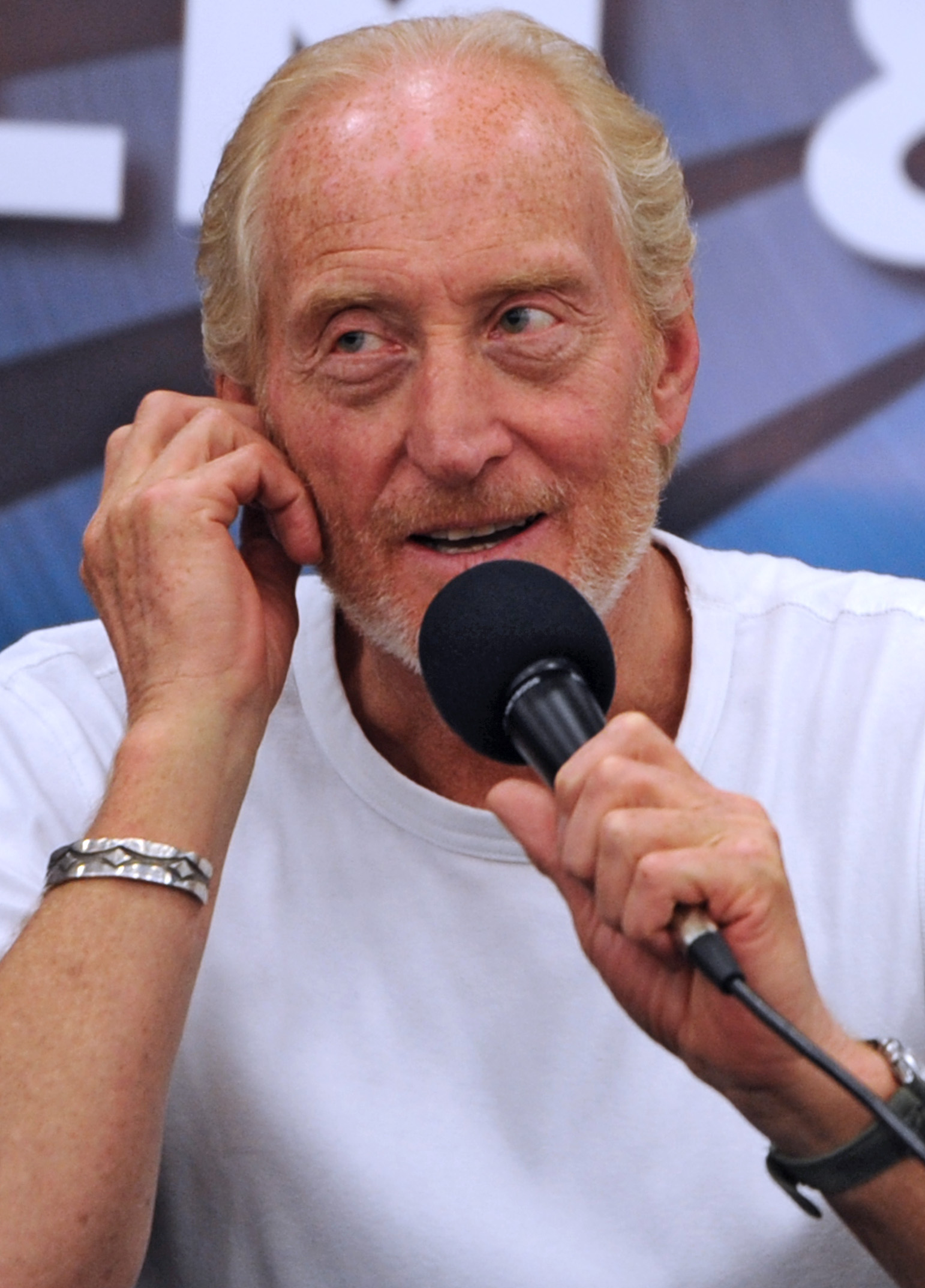
Charles Dance

Aredian (portrayed by Charles Dance) was a freelance sorcerer hunter nicknamed 'The Witchfinder'. In the second-season episode, "The Witchfinder", Uther hired Aredian to search Camelot for sorcerers after a smoke manipulation spell performed by Merlin was witnessed and reported by a citizen. After interrogating several people, Aredian accuses Merlin of sorcery. In a subsequent search of Gaius' workshop, an enchanted bracelet was found and taken as evidence of Merlin's guilt. Trying to protect Merlin, Gaius claimed ownership of the bracelet, which resulted in Gaius being taken into custody and Merlin being released.

Aredian then proceeded with an intense interrogation and then blackmailed Gaius into giving a false confession of sorcery, stating that if he did so, he would not accuse Merlin and Morgana before the king. Because of this confession, Uther reluctantly sentenced Gaius to death. The execution was halted, however, when Merlin brought forth proof that Aredian had orchestrated the entire event by drugging the witnesses. After having his chambers searched and evidence discovered, evidence that had, in fact, been planted by Merlin, Aredian panicked and took Morgana hostage in an attempt to get out of Camelot alive. Merlin intervened by heating the dagger in Aredian's hand and in the ensuing scuffle, Aredian fell out of a glass window from a high tower to his death.

=== Arthur Pendragon ===
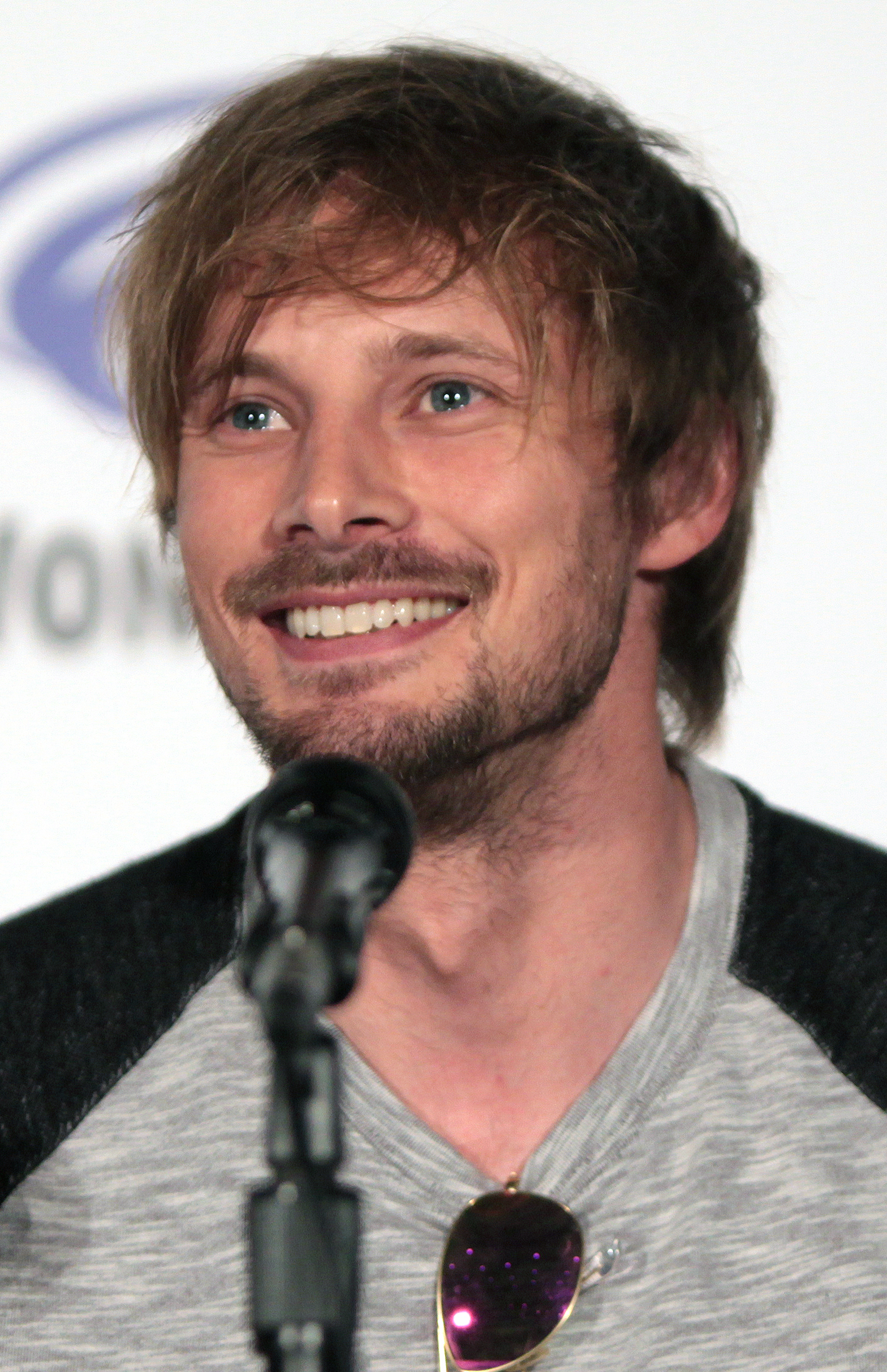
Bradley James

Arthur Pendragon (portrayed by Bradley James) was the king of Camelot and formerly the prince. He was the only son of Uther Pendragon and Ygraine, and the half-brother of Morgana Pendragon. He was prophesied to become the "once and future king who will unite the land of Albion", and was revealed in the episode "Excalibur" to have been conceived with the help of magic, due to his mother having been unable to have children. In the first season, Arthur began as a spoiled bully, shown throwing knives at a terrified servant, and picking a fight with Merlin on multiple occasions just for a laugh. After Merlin saved Arthur's life from an assassin in the pilot episode, "The Dragon's Call", Merlin was made his manservant. Their initial relationship was rocky, as both had little understanding of each other and their different personalities clashed frequently. However, over the course of the first season, Arthur began to mature, showing that he did care for other people and was not as selfish as he seemed. In "The Poisoned Chalice", Arthur disobeyed Uther to seek out a cure for Merlin after he drank from a poisoned goblet meant for Arthur himself and stated such a loyal servant was hard to find. On another occasion, in "The Beginning of the End", Arthur assisted Merlin in helping to free a Druid boy and returning him to his people (unknowing that the boy was actually Mordred, the person destined to one day kill him). Arthur also travelled to Merlin's home village of Ealdor to defend it from raiders in the episode, "The Moment of Truth", proving again that he cared more about Merlin than he generally let on. Arthur also cared deeply for the kingdom and its people, feeling immensely guilty when he brought a curse upon them after killing a unicorn in the episode, "The Labyrinth of Gedref". He underwent a series of tests to remove the curse, and even failed the second one. When faced with the choice of either him or Merlin drinking poison to stop the curse, Arthur took the responsibility upon himself, refusing to let Merlin or Camelot die because of him.

In the second season, Arthur's relationships with Merlin and Morgana's maidservant, Guinevere, deepen. In "The Once and Future Queen", Arthur spent a few days living with Gwen while he entered a jousting tournament under an assumed name. Called out on his rude and inconsiderate behaviour by Gwen, Arthur slowly began to develop feelings for her, and they even shared their first kiss on the last day of the tournament. Shortly thereafter in the episode, "Lancelot and Guinevere", Arthur and Merlin raced to rescue Gwen after she was kidnapped by a warlord, Hengist. He was devastated to see then that Gwen had discovered that she had feelings for Lancelot, who had also tried to rescue her at this time. Arthur's stance on the subject of magic was also explored in the second season. In the episode, "The Sins of the Father", Arthur voiced the thought that it was possible that not all magic users were evil when Merlin cautioned him not to trust the sorceress, Morgause, too quickly. When Morgause subsequently engineered the revelation of the truth of Arthur's magic-induced birth, which resulted in the death of Arthur's mother, Arthur returned to Camelot and nearly killed Uther in a blind rage. He was only stopped when Merlin intervened, who tearfully claimed that Morgause had been lying and faked the story. Arthur later claimed to believe that all magic was evil, which visibly devastated Merlin. Arthur's relationship with Morgana was also developed in the second season. He was greatly concerned when she was thought to have been kidnapped by the Druids and set off to rescue her in "The Nightmare Begins." In the penultimate episode, "The Fires of Idirsholas," Arthur is visibly devastated when Morgana is seemingly kidnapped by Morgause, blaming himself for having failed to protect her. In the finale episode, "The Last Dragonlord," Arthur was yet again called upon to defend Camelot against overwhelming odds. With the Great Dragon freed and repeatedly attacking Camelot, Arthur and Merlin set off in the faint hope that they could secure the aid of the last living Dragonlord, Balinor, who was also, unbeknownst to Arthur, Merlin's father. Though they eventually gained Balinor's willingness to help, mainly because Balinor was saved in the past by Gaius, the older man was killed on the journey back to Camelot. After returning to Camelot, Arthur gathered a group of knights to make a final assault in the hope of defeating the dragon, even over Uther's protests. He led them and Merlin, who insisted on accompanying him, out into a field beyond Camelot to engage the dragon. Arthur stabbed the dragon with a lance but was subsequently knocked out. When he came to, Merlin told him that he had dealt the dragon a mortal blow, when in reality, Merlin used his new status as a Dragonlord to command it to cease its attack.

The third season opened with Arthur and Merlin embarking on various missions to find the missing Morgana. After repulsing an attack by raiders, they found her and returned her to Camelot. Arthur was visibly relieved to have her home again, even hugging her, but remained unaware that in the year she had been gone, Morgana had switched sides and allied with Morgause to bring down Uther and Camelot. He did not discover her true allegiances or the fact that she was his half-sister until the penultimate episode, "The Coming of Arthur, Part One." Arthur's relationship with Gwen continued to develop over the third series as well. In the episode "The Castle of Fyrien," when she was faced with the decision of having to trade Arthur for her brother, Elyan, whom Morgause and Cenred had kidnaped, Arthur set out to help her rescue him along with Merlin and Morgana, the latter of whom was actually in on the plan. Later, in the episode "Queen of Hearts," Arthur stated that he would give up his right to the throne of Camelot for her after Morgana framed Gwen for witchcraft. He was visibly devastated when Uther sentenced her to death. But, after Gwen was saved by Merlin disguised as an old sorcerer who took responsibility for a poultice planted in Arthur's bed, Arthur and Gwen agreed to keep their relationship secret for the moment. By the end of the season, though, Arthur decided to throw caution to the wind, even kissing her in front of others on more than one occasion in "The Coming of Arthur, Part Two." Arthur also spent part of the third season being targeted for assassination at Morgana's hands. After discovering that she was his half-sister in "The Crystal Cave," Morgana sought to have him killed on numerous occasions to clear her path to the throne. In addition to the events of "The Castle of Fyrien," Morgana gave Arthur a phoenix bracelet in "The Eye of the Phoenix," which would sap him of his life while he was on a quest to prove his right to Camelot's throne by fetching the Fisher King's trident. In each of these situations, Merlin can save Arthur and is even aided by Gwaine during the incident in "The Eye of the Phoenix." In the next-to-last episode, "The Coming of Arthur, Part One," Arthur is sent on a mission to retrieve the Cup of Life from the Druids, unaware that Morgana and Morgause also sought it to use against Camelot. He and Merlin (and Gwaine, who joined them later) briefly gained the Cup, but it was taken from them while they fled from Cenred's men. By the time they returned to Camelot, Morgause had already utilised the Cup's power to make Cenred's army immortal and had taken command of it to storm the kingdom. Arthur and Merlin were then forced to watch as Morgause stripped Uther of his crown and throne, and Morgana declared herself Uther's daughter and Queen of Camelot. By the events of "The Coming of Arthur, Part Two," Arthur had lost faith in himself and was devastated by Morgana's betrayal. It took much cajoling from Merlin to lift his spirits and encourage him to stand up to Morgana. When Arthur and his group were reunited with Gwen and Leon and rescued by Lancelot and his friend, Percival, they retreated to a castle once owned by the old kings of Camelot. It was there that Arthur knighted Lancelot, Gwaine, Elyan, and Percival on the eve of their attempt to reclaim Camelot and rescue Uther. The following day, Arthur led his small band into the dungeons. He fought fiercely against Morgana's immortal soldiers, holding them off until Merlin destroyed them by emptying the Cup of Life of the blood it held. The aftermath of Morgana's occupation left Uther devastated and Arthur in charge for the foreseeable future.

The events of the fourth season, set a year later, began with Arthur as Camelot's regent, aided by the council and especially his uncle, Agravaine, who was his mother's brother. Just as he remained unaware of Morgana's true loyalties in the third season, Arthur remained unaware of Agravaine's allegiance to Morgana until the end of the season. In the first episode, "The Darkest Hour, Part One," Arthur found Camelot under threat when Morgana sacrificed a dying Morgause to release the Dorocha, the spirits of the dead, to wreak her revenge on the kingdom. After learning that only another blood sacrifice will seal the rift that released the Dorocha, Arthur decided that he would sacrifice himself and set off for the Isle of the Blessed, accompanied by Merlin, Lancelot, Leon, Gwaine, Elyan, and Percival. Along the way, Merlin was struck by one of the spirits after he threw himself in front of Arthur, and Arthur was visibly relieved when Merlin miraculously survived. In "The Darkest Hour, Part Two," Arthur continues his quest to sacrifice himself but is stopped when Merlin uses magic to knock him out. Arthur remained unaware that Merlin tried to take his place, but because the Cailleach decreed that Merlin's "time among men was not yet over," she accepted Lancelot's sacrifice instead. Arthur was deeply grieved by the loss of Lancelot, and even more so when Gwen later revealed that she had asked the knight to look after Arthur, indirectly inspiring him to sacrifice himself. Arthur did not remain regent of Camelot long after this when Uther was struck down by an assassin trying to kill Arthur in "The Wicked Day." As Uther lay dying, Arthur frantically sought out a sorcerer who might be able to heal his father's wounds, unknowing that the sorcerer was Merlin in the same disguise he wore in the third-season episode, "Queen of Hearts." He revealed his plan to seek magical assistance to Agravaine, who later planted a charmed necklace on Uther which would reverse the intent of any magic used on him. As a result, when the disguised Merlin tries to heal Uther, the magic is reversed and ends up killing him. Uther's death enraged Arthur and incited him further against magic, even causing him to confide in Merlin later that he despised magic and believed it truly evil. Arthur carried the weight of his father's death well after his subsequent coronation. In the episode, "His Father's Son", he allowed his uncertainty and the poisoned advice of Agravaine to drive him to execute an opposing king, Caerleon, which earned Arthur the enmity of the dead king's wife, Queen Annis. Agravaine also influenced Arthur to end his relationship with Gwen, saying that it was inappropriate for a king to be involved with a servant. Arthur could barely avert a full-on war with Queen Annis and even earned a tentative peace with her, and he later apologises to Gwen. Soon after this, Arthur remembered just how much he cared for and relied on Merlin when the other man was captured by bandits in "A Servant of Two Masters". He ordered a thorough search in the aftermath and even went out to search for him personally, accompanied by Gwaine. When Merlin was found, Arthur was thrilled to see him, even hugging him. Arthur's relationship with Gwen finally seemed to reach fruition in "Lancelot du Lac" when he asked her to marry him. She accepted, but their engagement was destroyed when Morgana revived an amnesiac Lancelot, bound him to her service, and ordered him to seduce Gwen with the help of an enchanted bracelet. Agravaine led Arthur into a chamber, allowing him to stumble upon Gwen and Lancelot in a passionate embrace. Arthur was enraged and even attacked Lancelot before ordering both of them to be imprisoned. Though many people of the court encouraged Arthur to put her to death, Arthur instead banished Gwen from Camelot and confided to Merlin that although he still loved her, he could never trust her again. The next few episodes after "Lancelot du Lac" saw Arthur visibly saddened by the loss of Gwen but also firmer and sometimes even cruel. On more than one occasion in "The Hunter's Heart." he even threatened to send Merl," to join Gwen in exile. In "The Sword in the Stone, Part One," Arthur was ambushed within Camelot itself by an army led by Morgana and the warlord, Helios. During the invasion, Arthur finally witnessed Agravaine's betrayal before he and Merlin were forced to flee Camelot. However, Merlin was forced to enchant Arthur to get him to leave the city. On the way to Ealdor, they encounter the smugglers Tristan and Isolde and are eventually attacked by the pursuing Agravaine and his forces. The four eventually made it to Ealdor, where Arthur was treated for his wounds and had a brief moment of reconciliation with Gwen, who had since come to stay with Merlin's mother, Hunith. This reconciliation did not initially last, however, and in "The Sword in the Stone, Part Two," Arthur dismissed her, calling it "a moment of weakness." Arthur, along with Merlin, Gwen, Tristan, and Isolde, had to flee Ealdor when Agravaine caught up to them. They hid in a series of caves, and unbeknownst to Arthur, Merlin had killed Agravaine at that time.

At this time, Arthur was again thoroughly demoralised by the betrayal of a family member. He doubted his destiny, saying he was only good at wielding a sword and was a terrible king. In the hope of restoring Arthur's faith, Merlin led him to where he had hidden Excalibur, telling him that "according to legend," only the true king of Camelot could pull the sword from the stone. Though initially doubtful, Arthur trusted Merlin enough to try and did pull the sword free, proving his worthiness and providing him with the boost of confidence needed to retake Camelot. After reuniting with a sizable force that included a large number of knights, including Leon and Percival, Arthur led them all, along with Merlin, Gwen, Tristan, and Isolde, in an invasion of the castle. During the ensuing battle, Arthur encountered Morgana for the first time since her coronation in "The Coming of Arthur, Part One" and sadly asked what had happened to her, visibly grieved to see that she had fallen so far. Morgana wavered briefly before him, showing some slight sign of guilt, but eventually told him that his stance on magic had led to this. She told him that he was just like Uther, but Arthur retaliated by saying that she was too, which visibly angered her. She tried to use magic to attack him, but Morgana was left powerless, thanks to Merlin sabotaging her power the night before. She ultimately fled, leaving Arthur once again in control of Camelot. Shortly after that, Arthur truly forgave Gwen for what had happened in "Lancelot du Lac" before finally marrying her and crowning her Queen of Camelot.

Three years later, Sir Gwaine's garrison goes missing, and Elyan returns from the search party disappointed, with no sign of Gwaine, Percival, or any of the men. But Elyan does have clues to where Gwaine is: at Morgana's new hideout, Ruadan's castle. So, due to his compassion, Arthur and his remaining knights try to get there, but openly (not for Morgana) using Annis' kingdom instead. They are later ambushed by Saxons, and a fight starts. Arthur comes to Leon's aid, allowing him to escape while Arthur fights Ruadan, but Ruadan almost knocks Arthur out. Elyan takes over, allowing Merlin to take Arthur to safety. Arthur wants to go back and rescue his men, while Merlin says otherwise. When Merlin finds food, he doesn't need to be asked twice to take it; Arthur on the other hand is puzzled why somebody would just leave dead rabbits lying around ... and they both trigger a trap. In the morning, Saxons threaten to kill the pair, but then Mordred appears and saves them. Merlin doesn't fully trust Mordred, a feeling echoed throughout the series. The final battle at Camlann sees Merlin at his most powerful, dispatching hordes of Saxons and the White Dragon. However, despite his efforts, Arthur is mortally wounded by Mordred's sword "Clemant" – which leaves a shard of the blade lodged in Arthur. Arthur kills Mordred outright with Excalibur, and then collapses. Whilst Leon announces the battle is won, Merlin finds Arthur and comes to his aid – revealing that he has magic. This crushes Arthur with devastation, but he soon comes to realise that Merlin hid this secret to protect Arthur and do his duty to his king. Merlin hid it also to protect Arthur from himself: Merlin feared what Arthur would really think and do. Merlin then tries to save Arthur by taking him to Avalon, where it's hoped the magic from the sword used to stab Arthur could be lifted. However, Arthur gives Gaius the Royal Seal, telling him to give it to Guinevere as he hopes she will succeed him. Morgana finds where they are heading and attacks them, hoping to watch Arthur die slowly, but Merlin kills her. However, just as they arrive, Arthur dies in Merlin's arms. The dying king tells Merlin that he is thankful for everything he has done – something which Arthur had never said before. Arthur reaches his hand to touch Merlin's hair, knowing it is the last time he ever will. The Great Dragon confirms that Arthur is dead; however Merlin realises his destiny is to protect the King's resting place. The series ends with Merlin returning Excalibur to the lake, which is then shown in modern times, safeguarded by an immortal Merlin, waiting for Arthur to return to Albion.

=== Aulfric ===
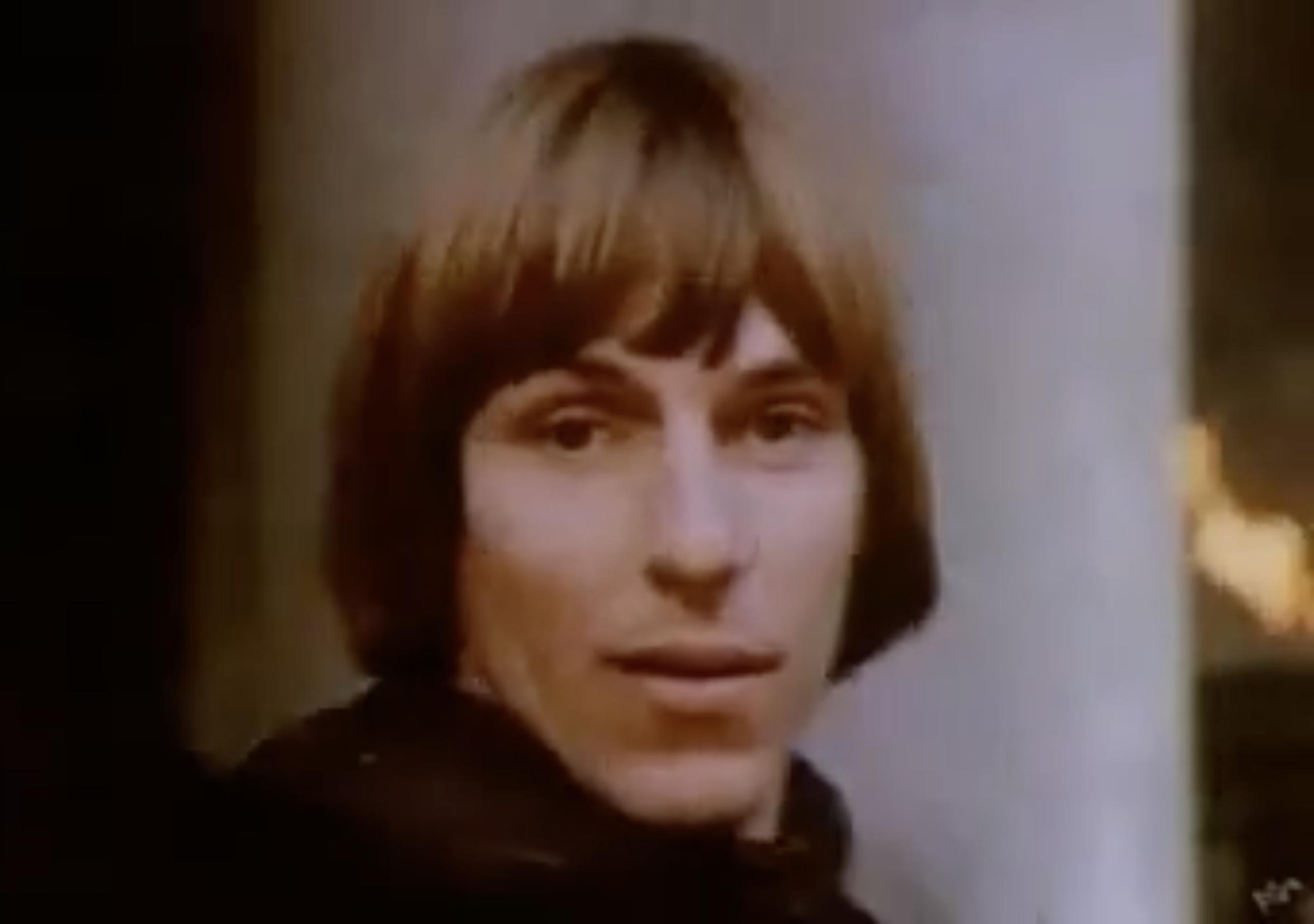
Kenneth Cranham

Aulfric (portrayed by Kenneth Cranham) was a Sidhe in human form. In the first-season episode, "The Gates of Avalon", he and his daughter, Sophia, seek to return to Avalon, the land of eternal youth, after they were banished to Camelot to live as humans as punishment for Aulfric killing another Sidhe. To return, the Sidhe elders demanded a "princely sacrifice", and Aulfric chose Arthur. After they had thrust him into the water of the Lake of Avalon, Aulfric urged his daughter to return, though he was forced to remain behind as penalty for his crime. Merlin prevented them both from finishing the sacrifice and killing Arthur, using Sophia's discarded magical staff to kill both Aulfric and his daughter.

== B ==
=== Bayard ===
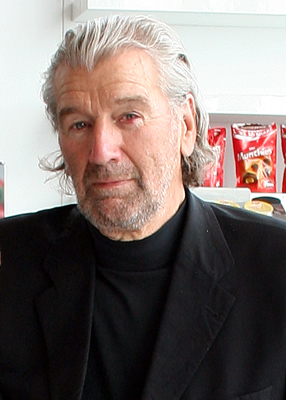
Clive Russell

Bayard (portrayed by Clive Russell) is the king of Camelot's neighbouring kingdom of Mercia. In "The Poisoned Chalice", Bayard and many of his knights visited Camelot with the intention of signing a peace treaty with Uther. When Merlin drank from a poisoned goblet at the celebratory feast that was meant to be a gift for Arthur, Uther had Bayard and his entire entourage imprisoned. Bayard's army was dispatched to begin a war with Camelot, but the crisis was averted when Gaius revealed to Uther that the poisoned cup had actually been planted by Nimueh, who hoped to foment trouble for the kingdom. Subsequently, Uther released Bayard and his court, and they returned to Mercia. Despite this awkward situation, Bayard appeared to remain on good terms with Camelot. In "Beauty and the Beast, Part Two", he sent his congratulations on Uther's marriage to Lady Catrina and was mentioned as planning to visit Camelot in the near future.

=== Balinor ===
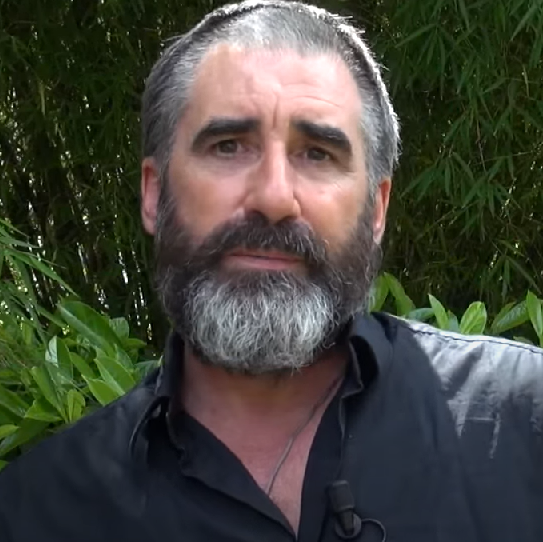
John Lynch

Balinor (portrayed by John Lynch) was the last known Dragonlord. In the second-season finale, "The Last Dragonlord", Gaius revealed to Merlin that Balinor was also the warlock's father. During the Great Purge, Uther contacted Balinor to express his desire to make peace with the Great Dragon. Balinor brought the dragon to Camelot, but they were then betrayed and Uther imprisoned the creature in the caverns beneath the city. Gaius helped Balinor to flee Camelot and sent him to Ealdor, where he stayed for a brief time with Merlin's mother, Hunith. He was then forced to run when Uther's soldiers pursued him there, and he left before learning that Hunith was pregnant with Merlin.

After the Great Dragon was freed in "The Fires of Idirsholas" and began a series of repeated attacks on Camelot in the second-season finale, Arthur and Merlin went on a desperate search to find Balinor, hoping to convince him to stop the dragon's assault. They found him living in a cave, away from civilisation. When first asked to help, Balinor refused, bitter and resentful of Uther's treatment of the dragon and of his own people, who had been slaughtered along with many other magic users at the time. Before Arthur and Merlin left him, Merlin revealed that Gaius was one of the people under threat and that Merlin himself was Balinor's son, and a short time later, Balinor rejoined the two, agreeing to help.

In their brief time together, Balinor described the power of the Dragonlords to Merlin, explaining that they were the dragons' kind and that the power passed down from father to son. He even carved a wooden dragon and left it beside Merlin for him to find. Before the three travellers could reach Camelot, however, they were attacked by soldiers of Cenred, and Balinor sacrificed his life to save Merlin, dying in his son's arms. With his death, Merlin became the last remaining Dragonlord.

Balinor appeared in the "Diamond of the Day, Part One" as a cameo in the Crystal Cave, who gives Merlin strength and courage to find Arthur.

== C ==
=== Caerleon ===
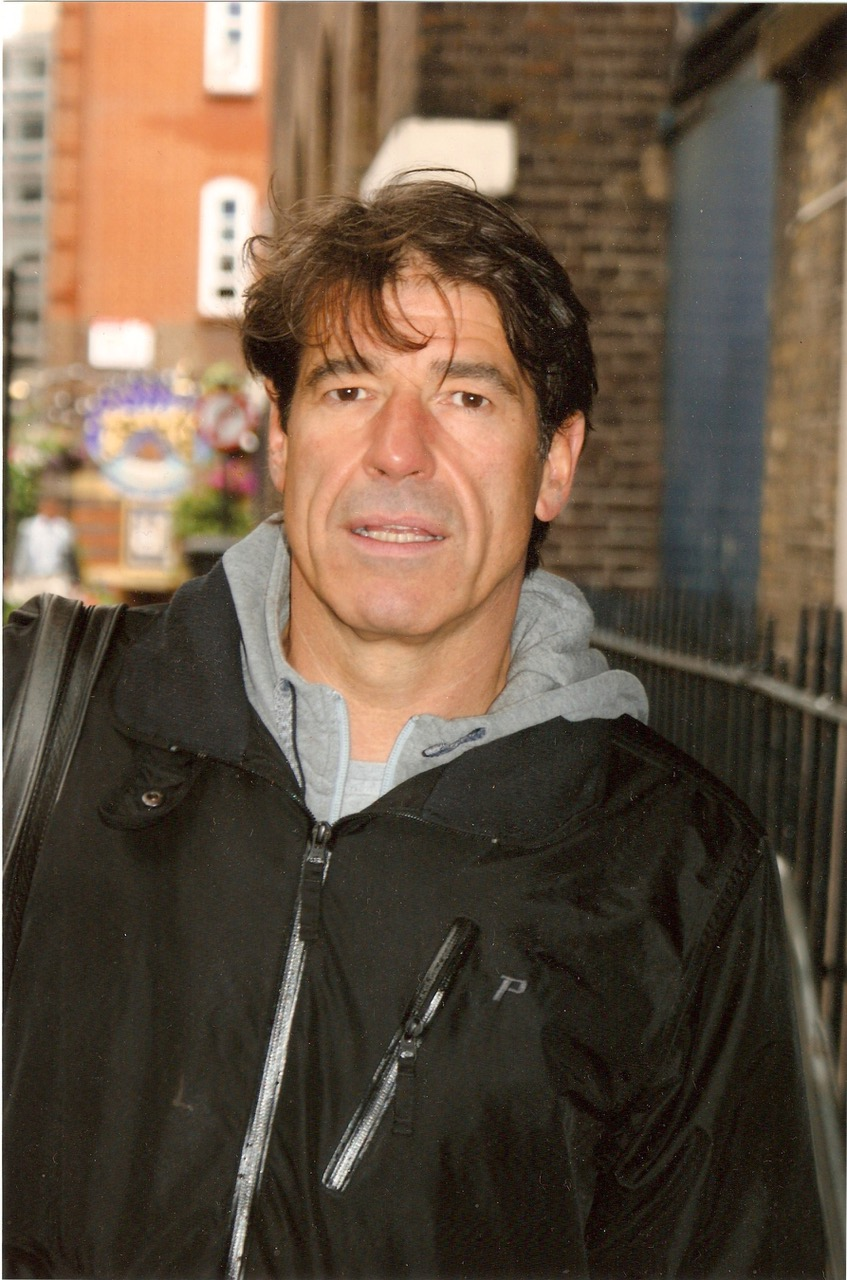
Steven Hartley

King Caerleon (portrayed by Steven Hartley) led mercenaries around Camelot to conquer land. He ran with them, carrying a sword. It is unknown if he was good at sword fighting, but it is assumed that this would be the case since he appeared to lead from the front. Several years before, he fought in the Battle of Denaria and survived which implies that he was skilled in battle. Little is known about Caerleon's personality. It is unknown how exactly he treated his wife, Annis. However, it is assumed that he loved his wife, and she proved to love him back, with the grief for her husband's death fuelling her vengeance on Arthur over his death. He appeared to not care much about his kingdom as he was willing to leave it when he wanted more land. Caerleon was also very stubborn and proud as he refused to sign a peace treaty and appear weak, even when his life was threatened.

=== Catrina ===
Catrina (portrayed by Sarah Parish) was a noble of the House of Tregor. In the second-season episodes, "Beauty and the Beast, Part One" and "Part Two", she was impersonated by a troll who wished to gain control of Camelot's wealth and power. Using a potion that allowed her to temporarily take on the form of Lady Catrina, the troll and her servant, Jonas, infiltrated Camelot and arranged a meeting with Uther. The troll soon enchanted Uther, causing him to fall in love with her. Merlin and Gaius quickly realised that the troll was an imposter when she refused a tonic Gaius had prepared for her, a tonic that, many years before, Gaius had used to ease the pain the real Catrina suffered from an incurable bone disease. Upon learning that the troll was an imposter, Gaius and Merlin attempted to get rid of her, but were unable to stop her from marrying Uther and having herself crowned Queen of Camelot at the conclusion of "Beauty and the Beast, Part One".

In "Beauty and the Beast, Part Two", the fake Catrina utilised the enchantment she held over Uther even further, creating a rift between him and Arthur and even persuading him to disinherit his son and leave her as next in line for the throne. She also used her power over Uther to frame Merlin for theft, which forced him to go into hiding. It was during this time that Merlin discovered that the troll had to continually take a potion to maintain the form of Catrina. He had Gaius replicate the potion, only without the magical effect, and replaced the troll's own store. The troll's true form was subsequently exposed just after she was named as Uther's new heir, but the enchantment was so strong that Uther remained blind to her true appearance even after everyone else saw it and she could now show herself without fear. Due to her greed Uther placed harsh taxes on the people of Camelot to satisfy her lust for wealth. Merlin was then forced to ask the Great Dragon for help, and discovered that the only way to break the enchantment was to have Uther cry tears of "true remorse". Merlin and Gaius persuaded Arthur to take a tincture that simulated death, and Gaius retrieved Uther, who wept over his son's seemingly dead body. The troll attempted to pull Uther away, but was unable to prevent the enchantment from being broken. In the subsequent fight, both the troll and Jonas were slain by Arthur assisted by Merlin's magic.

The fate of the real Catrina was left uncertain, although Uther stated in "Beauty and the Beast, Part One" that her city was devastated by invaders. She may have perished along with the rest of her family in the destruction.

=== Cedric ===
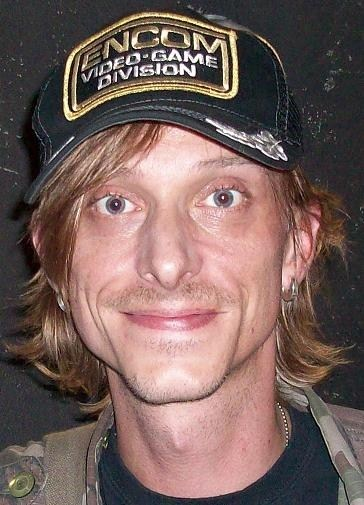
Mackenzie Crook

Cedric (portrayed by Mackenzie Crook) was a conman who set out to usurp Merlin's place as Arthur's manservant. In the second-season premiere, "The Curse of Cornelius Sigan", Cedric sought to gain access to Arthur's personal rooms in order to steal the keys to an underground burial chamber where a great treasure had been discovered. When Merlin used magic to spear a wild boar that attacked Arthur during a hunt, Cedric took credit for the kill and was rewarded with a position in the royal household. He then set Arthur's horses loose and knocked Merlin out so that he would be blamed for it. Arthur subsequently sent Merlin home and appointed Cedric in his place, giving the conman the access he needed. He entered the burial chamber and attempted to steal the jewel set in the tomb of Cornelius Sigan, but was instead possessed by Sigan's spirit. Inhabiting Cedric's body, Sigan animated the citadel's gargoyles and unleashed a raven-like monster to destroy Camelot, forcing Merlin to go to the Great Dragon for help. Armed with a spell, Merlin sought out the unconscious Arthur and refused to abandon him and join Sigan. Sigan then left Cedric's body and attempted to possess Merlin's, but was then trapped back in the jewel that had been his previous prison. It was left uncertain as to Cedric's ultimate fate.

=== Cenred ===
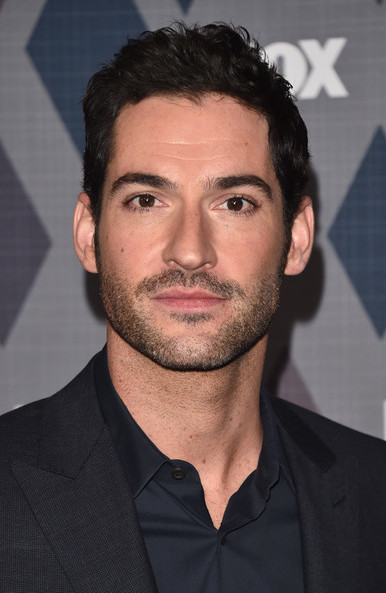
Tom Ellis

Cenred (portrayed by Tom Ellis) was the ruler of a neighbouring kingdom of Camelot's, the kingdom that held Merlin's home village, Ealdor, as in the first-season episode, "The Moment of Truth", Uther stated that the safety of Ealdor was "Cenred's responsibility". Cenred was also an ally of Morgause's and spent much of the third season assisting her and Morgana in their plots to take over Camelot or assassinate Arthur and Uther. In "The Coming of Arthur, Part One", however, Morgause betrayed him by taking control of Cenred's army, which had just been made immortal via the Cup of Life, and ordered one of the soldiers to kill him.

=== Cornelius Sigan ===
Cornelius Sigan (portrayed by Mackenzie Crook when possessing Cedric's body) was the greatest sorcerer Camelot had ever known. In the second-season premiere, "The Curse of Cornelius Sigan", it was revealed that he was executed for his use of evil magic. He cursed Camelot on his death, swearing to one day return and destroy the city. His fabulous wealth was buried with him and was later discovered during an excavation ordered by Uther. Unaware that the glowing jewel set into Sigan's sarcophagus contained the sorcerer's soul, the conman Cedric attempted to steal the jewel but was possessed by Sigan's spirit instead. Sigan then unleashed a raven-like monster (Sigan's name meaning 'raven' in the language of the Old Religion) and animated the citadel's gargoyles to destroy Camelot.

Merlin was eventually able to destroy the creature and the gargoyles, revealing himself as a sorcerer to Sigan. Sigan attempted to convince Merlin to join forces with him, tempting him with promises that they would rule Camelot together and that Arthur would "tremble at Merlin's feet", but Merlin refused. Sigan then tried to possess him, but Merlin was able to imprison Sigan's soul back in the jewel with the help of a spell given to him by the Great Dragon. The jewel and Sigan's treasure were subsequently returned to the burial chamber and sealed off.

== D ==
=== The Dolma ===
The Dolma (portrayed by Colin Morgan) is one of two characters who Merlin uses as a disguise (the other is Dragoon The Great). She appears only once, in Series 5's episode "With All My Heart", after Queen Guinevere is possessed by a spell cast by Morgana. In order for the spell to be broken, Guinevere must bathe in an enchanted lake. Due to the nature of the spell, she must enter of her own free will. King Arthur therefore must persuade her in. Due to Arthur's essential role and the requirement that there be a sorcerer on hand to break the spell once Guinevere is in position, Gaius informs Arthur that he has found a woman to perform the task. Merlin therefore assumes the role of The Dolma, an elderly, reclusive sorceress who has trouble getting clothes and who is the alleged guardian of the lake. This "difficulty in getting clothes" is the cover that Merlin needs to bring a dress with him to change into it when they arrive at the lake.

The Dolma's most memorable line is, "Nothing is hidden from ... The Dolma!". She also refers to Merlin as "the gangly boy" and uses him as surety to ensure that Arthur does not attempt to kill her for practicing magic.

=== Dragoon The Great ===
Dragoon The Great is one of the two characters whom Merlin uses as a disguise (the other being The Dolma). Merlin transforms himself into Dragoon by means of an aging spell, usually when he wishes to carry out a plan in which it is essential that he is not recognised. Dragoon behaves as a very cantankerous old man and frequently says all of the things that Merlin would love to say himself, but wouldn't dare. The disguise also allows Merlin to use his magic more openly than he can as himself. Dragoon is seen as an enemy of Camelot, but has more than once allied with Prince Arthur in order to fulfil a plan. It is in this form that Merlin helps Camelot defeat the Saxons at Camlann, throwing down Morgana with ease. Given that Merlin made up the name on the spot, there is speculation that he based it on a variation of "The Great Dragon" (Kilgarrah).

=== Drea ===
Drea (portrayed by Katie Moore) is a young woman who lived in the village of Howden. In the fourth-season premiere, "The Darkest Hour, Part One", her village was attacked by the Dorocha, the spirits of the dead. She managed to escape to Camelot, heavily traumatised by what she experienced, and managed to tell Arthur what had happened, as well as giving a vague description of the Dorocha. Drea had a mother, father, and younger sister, all of whom possibly perished in the attack.

== E ==
=== Edwin Muirden ===
Edwin Muirden (portrayed by Julian Rhind-Tutt) was a sorcerer who wore the guise of a physician. In "A Remedy to Cure All Ills", it was revealed that his parents were killed during the Great Purge. He blamed Uther, who ordered that they be burned, and Gaius, who did not attempt to save them because they had turned to dark magic. Edwin himself was also burned when he attempted to rescue his dying parents, and Gaius treated the wounds. As an adult, Edwin returned to Camelot, seeking revenge on Gaius and Uther. In order to gain access to Uther, he framed Gaius for incompetence and had himself named as Gaius' replacement as the court physician. Edwin then sent a magical beetle through Uther's ear to consume his brain. While waiting for Uther to die, Gaius, who had fled Camelot after being dismissed, returned and attempted to intervene. Edwin attempted to kill Gaius using flames, likely an attempt to mirror the flames Gaius had consigned Edwin's parents to, but Merlin appeared and stopped him. Edwin attacked Merlin then, but was defeated when Merlin magically returned an axe Edwin had thrown at him, hitting him in the head. Merlin was also able to save Uther, thus foiling Edwin's plot.

=== Elena ===
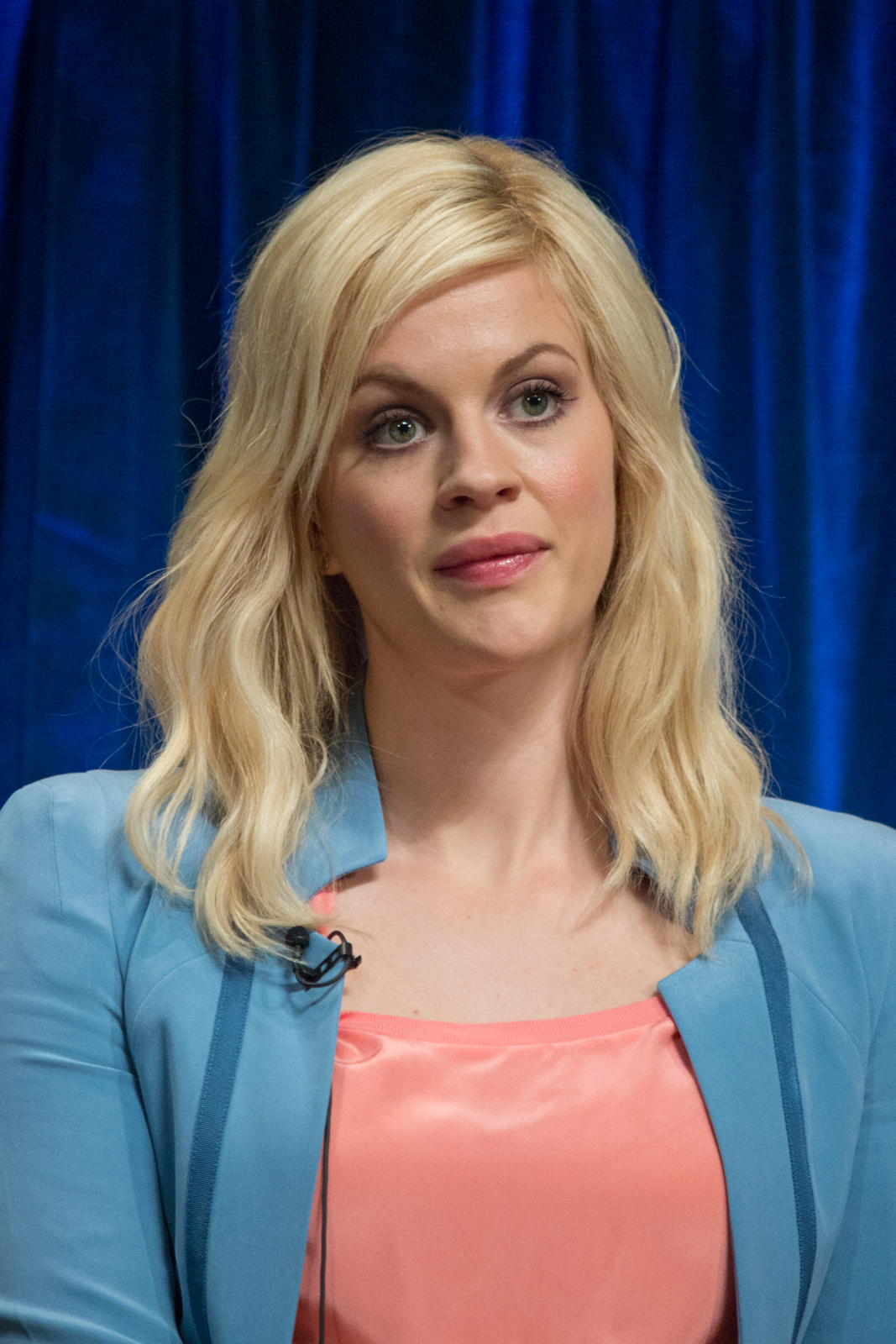
Georgia King

Elena (portrayed by Georgia King) is a princess and daughter of Lord Godwyn, an old friend of Uther's. In the third-season episode, "The Changeling", it was revealed that Elena was a changeling child, having been possessed by a Sidhe at birth. The Sidhe's possession had various side-effects in Elena, such as clumsiness and uncouth behaviour. Knowing that Godwyn would seek to improve his kingdom's ties with Camelot through a marriage between Elena and Arthur, the Sidhe King intended that the Sidhe within Elena would awaken after her marriage, placing a Sidhe on Camelot's throne. He even sent a pixie, Gruinhilde, to serve as Elena's nurse and guard the Sidhe inside her.

Merlin and Gaius eventually learned of the Sidhe's presence inside of Elena and took steps to remove it. Merlin defeated Gruinhilde in a magical battle in the corridor outside of Elena's chambers, and then fed Elena a potion Gaius had prepared to expel the Sidhe from her body. Once free from the Sidhe's influence, Elena was still willing to go through with marrying Arthur, for the sake of her father's wishes, but when Arthur asked if she was genuinely in love with him, she confirmed that she was not. They then mutually decided that they would not go through with the marriage if they were only there out of duty, rather than love.

=== Elyan ===
Elyan (portrayed by Adetomiwa Edun) was the younger brother of Gwen. In the third season, it was revealed that he had left Camelot some years previously, before the series began, and that he had not remained in touch with his family, leaving Gwen uncertain as to whether he was dead or alive. He did not even return after their father, Tom, was killed in the first-season episode, "To Kill the King". In "The Castle of Fyrien", Elyan and Gwen were reunited when Cenred and Morgause kidnapped the siblings in order to capture Arthur. When traveling to rescue him, Gwen described her brother to Arthur, calling him "one of those people who never settled down, never thinks about the future; just follows his heart wherever it leads him," and that he had a tendency to "always be in the wrong place at the wrong time." During the fight to escape Cenred and Morgause's clutches, Arthur was impressed and surprised with Elyan's skill with a sword and complimented him on it. After escaping the castle, Elyan travelled back to Camelot with the others, taking over his father's blacksmith shop and living with Gwen.

In "The Coming of Arthur, Part One", Elyan aided Merlin, Arthur, and Gwaine in rescuing Gaius from Camelot, which had been occupied by Morgana and Morgause's immortal army, before retreating to a nearby cave. In the third-season finale, "The Coming of Arthur, Part Two", Elyan agreed to join Arthur in his attempt to retake Camelot, stating that it was "his turn to lay his life down" for Arthur, since the prince had been willing to do the same for him back in "The Castle of Fyrien". Elyan was one of the four subsequently knighted in recognition of his loyalty to Camelot, despite his lack of noble birth. He aided in the battle in the dungeons, and was even wounded at the time.

In the fourth season, Elyan continued to serve as a knight of Camelot, and seemed to have developed an especially close friendship with Percival. In "The Darkest Hour, Part One", Elyan rescued Percival as he fled from the rampaging Dorocha, carrying several children. Elyan participated in several quests with Arthur throughout the season, and even swore to die for him when Camelot was on the cusp of war with Queen Annis in "His Father's Son". In "Lancelot du Lac", Gwen became engaged to Arthur, but when she was banished for supposedly betraying Arthur with Lancelot, Elyan did not accompany Gwen into her exile, remaining as a knight. In the following episode, "A Herald of a New Age", Elyan was possessed by the spirit of a dead Druid boy after disturbing his resting place. The spirit used Elyan to try and avenge his death by killing Arthur. Elyan's sudden attack on the king was at first thought to have been motivated by anger over Gwen's earlier banishment, but it was later discovered that he truly was being possessed. He was released by the spirit when Arthur returned to the site of the Druid resting place and swore that he would do everything he could to prevent another massacre, even promising to give the Druids "the respect they deserved".

In the fourth season's two-part finale, "The Sword in the Stone", Elyan was captured, along with Gaius and Gwaine, when Morgana again took over Camelot. Seeking Arthur's location, Morgana tortured Elyan with a Nathair snake, which caused him "pain beyond all imagining" and, according to Gaius, stresses the body to the full extent of human endurance. Elyan broke under the torture and revealed that Arthur was traveling to Ealdor and was locked in a cell with Gaius and Gwaine. Gaius recognised what had been done to him and was able to save him, but he was left weak from his ordeal. The three men were eventually released by Percival and Leon when Arthur and his forces reclaimed Camelot.

Three years later, Sir Gwaine and Sir Percival went lost away in the far North. Arthur entrusted the mission to Elyan to lead a search party for them. Elyan returned to Camelot, without much luck. He said he couldn't find where they were, but he guessed that they would be in Ruadan's castle.

They decided they would investigate Ruadan's castle, but using Annis' land approaching Ruadan from the West instead of the South. Elyan came with them. But then they were attacked by some Saxons. After Arthur got almost knocked out, Elyan started fighting Ruadan, giving Merlin some lee-way to take Arthur to safety.

After the fight, Elyan, Leon and a few other surviving knights returned to Camelot and told Gwen what happened. Gwen couldn't understand why the Saxons knew where they were. She then took Sefa to court and she confessed to being a traitor. For the first time, Gwen sentenced someone to death.

Later, in "The Dark Tower", Elyan was killed by an enchanted sword while saving Gwen from Morgana. He was given a hero's funeral.

=== Ewan ===
Ewan (portrayed by Keith Thorne) was a knight of Camelot. In the first-season episode, "Valiant", Ewan was bitten by the snakes on Valiant's enchanted shield during the annual sword-fighting tournament. Gaius managed to procure an antidote, but Valiant discovered that Ewan had survived and that Merlin had discovered his scheme. He subsequently sent the magical snakes after Ewan and he was bitten again, this time fatally to death.

== F ==
=== The Fisher King ===
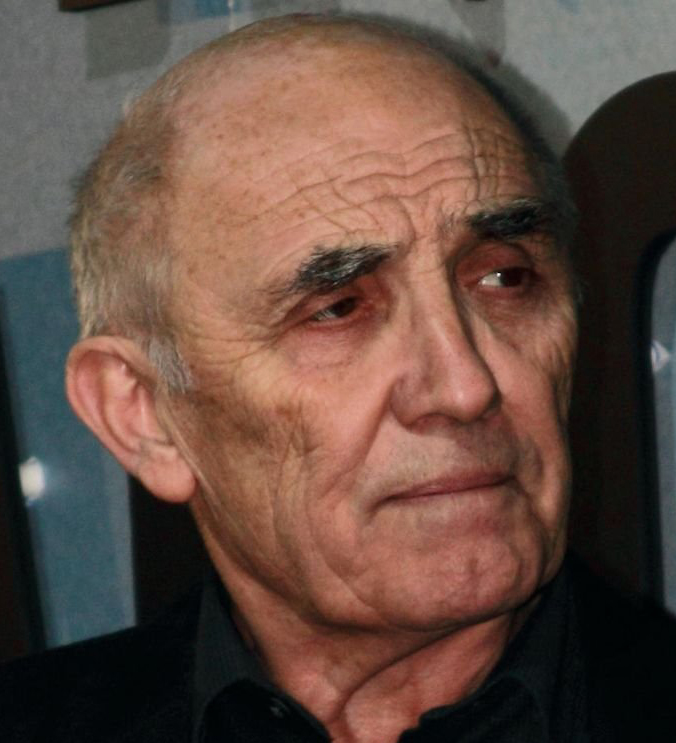
Donald Sumpter

The Fisher King (portrayed by Donald Sumpter) was the king of a nearby land that had been devastated by a plague. According to legend, the Fisher King was struck by a plague that spread to the rest of his land, destroying his people while leaving him immortal but permanently crippled, unable to take any action to halt what was happening to his lands. As part of a quest to prove his worthiness to be King, Arthur chose to undertake a quest to enter the realm of the Fisher King and recover his trident, unaware that Morgana had given him an 'Eye of the Phoenix', a gem that drained the wearer's life-energy. Fortunately, Merlin and Gwaine were able to follow him and remove the bracelet, Merlin subsequently coming face-to-face with the Fisher King when he was trapped in the King's throne room after a door closed behind him. As he faced Merlin, the still-alive Fisher King explained that the quest to his kingdom was actually for 'Emrys' rather than Arthur; the Fisher King's trident was nothing but a nice bauble, while the true treasure was water from the Lake of Avalon, which the Fisher King informed Merlin would be needed when Camelot's darkest hour came. In return for the water, the Fisher King asked that Merlin give him the Eye of the Phoenix, the Eye draining the Fisher King's last dregs of life and granting him the death he had sought for so long.

=== Freya ===
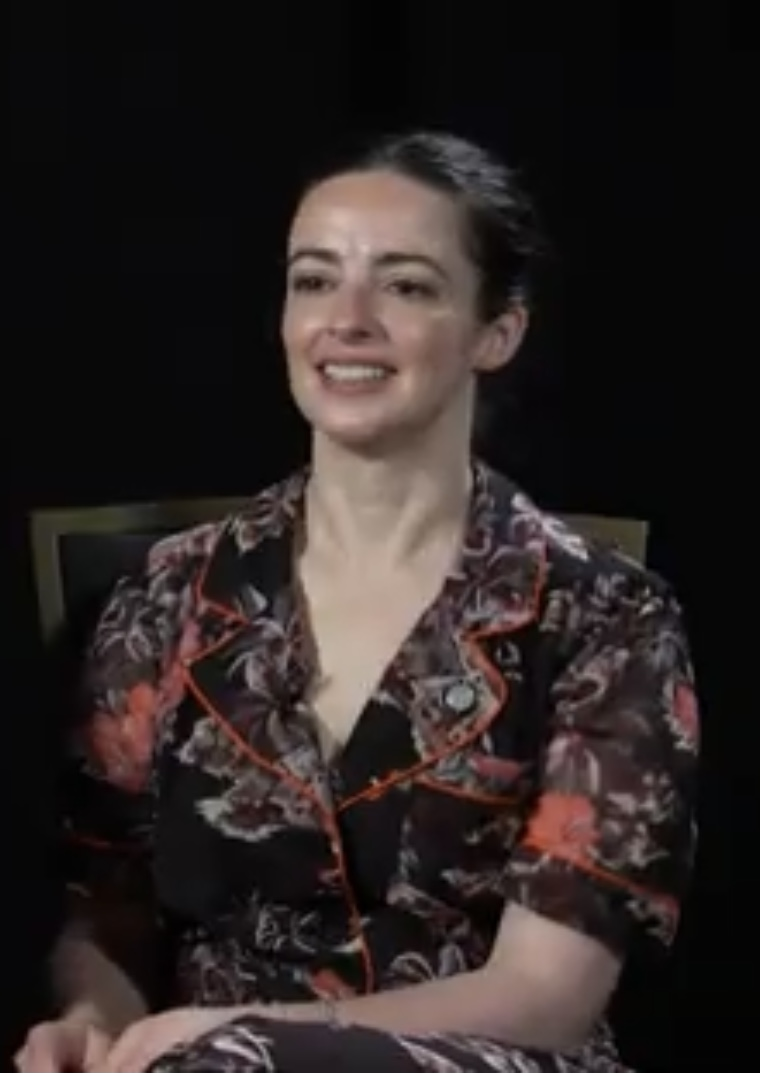
Laura Donnelly

Freya (portrayed by Laura Donnelly) was a Druid girl who lived in a village near mountains and a lake. After killing the son of a sorceress out of self-defence, Freya was cursed to become a magical monster that resembled a large panther with bat-like wings on the stroke of midnight, with an insatiable desire to kill that she would be unable to control. Under unspecified circumstances, Freya was captured by the bounty hunter Halig and taken to Camelot, only to be freed by Merlin. Hiding Freya in the catacombs, Merlin brought her food and told her about his magic, the two being drawn together due to Merlin's relief at having someone who understood him and Freya's gratitude at meeting someone who did not consider her a monster. Her curse resulted in the deaths of at least four people when she transformed during her two nights in Camelot, prompting an increased hunt for her. Merlin and Freya began to fall in love. Although Merlin had planned to leave Camelot with her, Freya attempted to escape on her own, not wanting Merlin to abandon his life for her, only to be cornered by Halig and Arthur's knights just before her transformation. Although she killed Halig, Arthur was able to mortally wound her beast form, the creature only escaping after Merlin caused a distraction by causing a gargoyle statue to fall over, creating a path for her to escape the knights and retreat down to the catacombs. Although beast-Freya appeared calmer around Merlin, calming down simply from the sight of him even when surrounded by the knights, the wound Freya had sustained proved to be fatal, staying alive only long enough for Merlin to take her to the nearby lake. As she died, she thanked Merlin for making her feel loved again, promising to repay his kindness one day. Merlin put her body on a boat and gave her a Viking-like funeral, clearly mourning his inability to save her.

It was revealed in Merlin: Secrets and Magic that Freya will somehow return and aid Merlin on his adventures. This came true in "The Coming of Arthur", when a vision of Freya appeared to Merlin in the water that the Fisher King had given Merlin, informing him that the sword Excalibur was hidden in the Lake of Avalon and that she would give it to him. Excalibur was the only weapon that could kill the immortal army of Morgana and Morgause's doing.

=== Finna ===
Finna appears in season 5 in the episode "The Kindness of Strangers"; she is the servant of Alator. She helps Merlin and gives him a message from Alator before committing suicide to keep Morgana from torturing her into telling her Emrys' true identity. Merlin was wounded while saving Finna from Morgana and reluctantly leaves her so that Morgana would not see him before Finna's death.

== G ==
=== Gaius ===
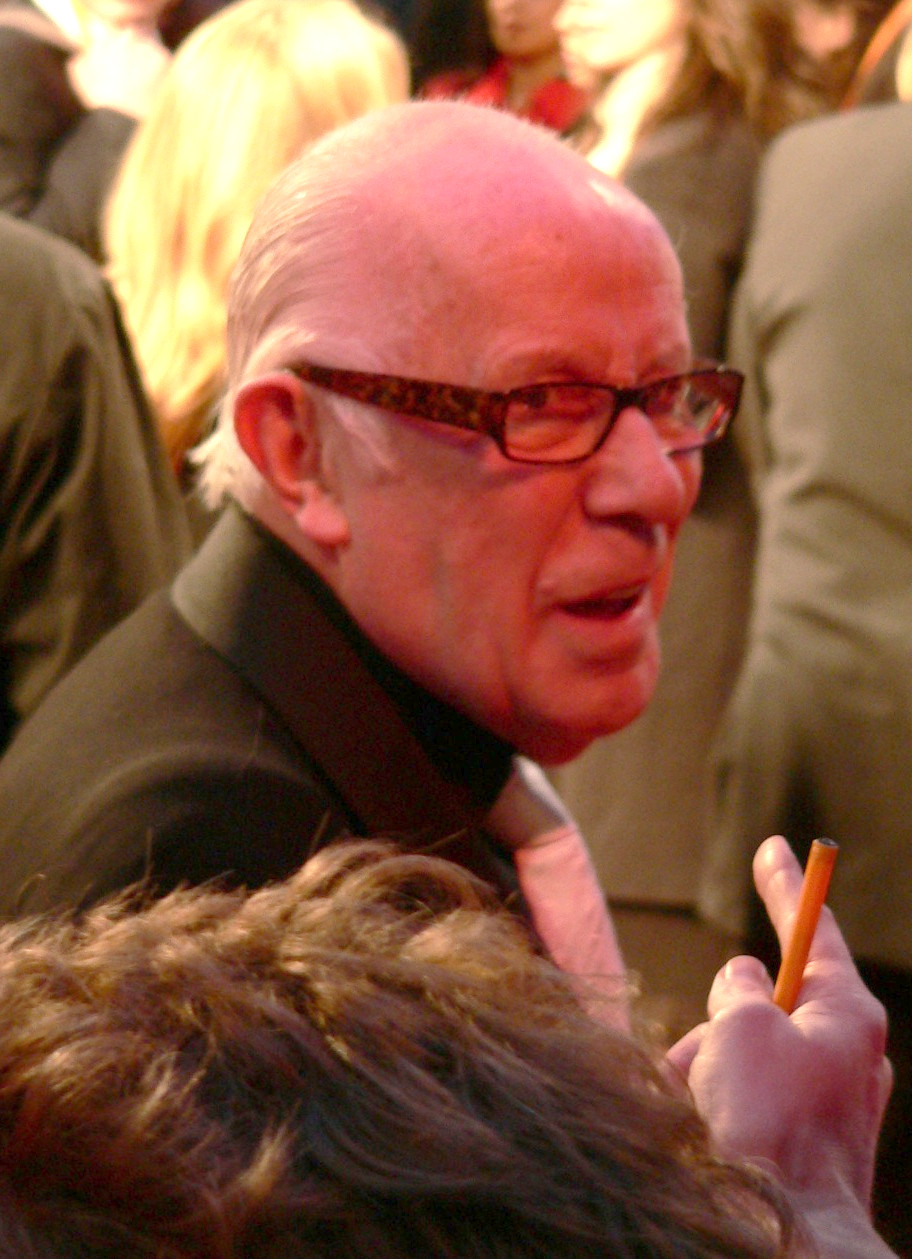
Richard Wilson

Gaius (portrayed by Richard Wilson) is Camelot's court physician and Merlin's guardian and mentor. He soon discovers that Merlin has magical powers and gives him a book of sorcery to study from in secret, warning him not to be caught using magic. Gaius himself used to practice sorcery – a fact that Uther is aware of, although he is satisfied that Gaius has forsaken his old magical abilities. He knows that Merlin's destiny far surpasses his own and is also very familiar with the Great Dragon. He is often called upon to get Merlin out of trouble or to remind him not to be reckless with the use of magic. Although his magical abilities are limited when compared to Merlin's, his greater experience is nevertheless of great benefit to Merlin, as he learns how to control and refine his abilities, while his knowledge of other such topics as mythology and medicine commonly provide Merlin and his friends with vital information in dealing with the current threat.

Gaius also has a valued place in Uther's council, being one of the few people who dares to speak out against Uther's actions on crucial occasions, although Uther's prejudice against magic commonly blinds him to Gaius's good advice. Uther has even shown a willingness to overlook his discoveries of past occasions where Gaius has disobeyed him, such as when Gaius revealed that he smuggled Morgana's half-sister, Morgause out of Camelot rather than allowing her to die, despite the fact that Uther would have killed anyone else who disobeyed him in such a manner. Although he has not used magic for years before Merlin's arrival in Camelot, Gaius has used spells since Merlin came into his life, such as using a spell to prepare an antidote when Merlin was poisoned and attempting to use magic to throw a weapon at Edwin Muirden (Although Edwin's magic proved more powerful than his), as well as occasionally assisting Merlin in treating injuries that can only be cured by magic. Even without magic, Gaius has shown exceptional talent as a physician, regularly treating injuries in the court, and even preparing a draught that precisely duplicates the taste of a troll potion without any access to the original recipe.

When Gaius was briefly possessed by a goblin, the goblin attempted to escape detection by accusing Merlin of sorcery- taking advantage of the fact that Merlin couldn't hurt him without hurting Gaius-, but this plan was threatened when Arthur and Gwen saw through the goblin's actions, recognising that Gaius would never take such pleasure in the idea of Merlin facing execution. Gwen even assisted Merlin in preparing a poison to 'kill' Gaius long enough to drive the goblin out of him so that Merlin could recapture it and an antidote to bring Gaius back, Gaius subsequently clearing Merlin of the charges the goblin had accused him of. On a later occasion, Gaius was briefly reunited with his old fiancée, Alice, who had been forced to flee the kingdom due to Uther's prosecution of magic, but Merlin's discovery that she was under the influence of a manticore forced her to leave once again even after he and Gaius destroyed the manticore, although Gaius chose to stay behind in order to continue guiding Merlin. When Morgana and Morgause attempted to conquer Camelot with an immortal army, Gaius played an important role in the final confrontation, attacking- and possibly fatally wounding Morgause to give Merlin time to empty the Cup of Life and deprive the sisters of their immortal army.

Gaius was still very active in series four. He explains about how dangerous the Dorocha spirits are but does not know how to defeat them. He cared for Uther and as Arthur he moaned his father's death. He did not like the return of Julius Borden as he knew his plan about stealing the dragon's egg. When Morgana employed a wizard called Alator to find out who Emrys is Gaius was kidnapped by Alator to reveal the real secret about Merlin. He then meets Morgana the very first time since the end of series three, where he begs her to kill him but she refuses to do it, because first she wanted to receive information about Emrys from him. During the final of series four he sits in the dungeons with Elyan and Gwaine, where he lies depressed, weak and dying. When Morgana gives them tiny pieces of bread for supper he does not agree to share and gives the food away to the knights, saying that the only thing he does not fear is death. He along with Elyan and Gwaine are rescued by Percival to face Morgana. He is last seen during Arthur's and Guinevere's wedding while standing next to Merlin and together with the crowd shouting "Long live the Queen!".

When Gwen becomes the main ruler of Camelot after Arthur's death, Gaius becomes her mentor, as Merlin was gone to wait by Avalon for the rise of Arthur. It is possible that Gaius died some years later as he was very old and tired.

"Secrets and Magic: Witch Hunt" twice referred to Gaius as Merlin's uncle—probably meaning Hunith's brother. Wilson also refers to Hunith as Gaius' sister in an interview.

=== Gwaine ===
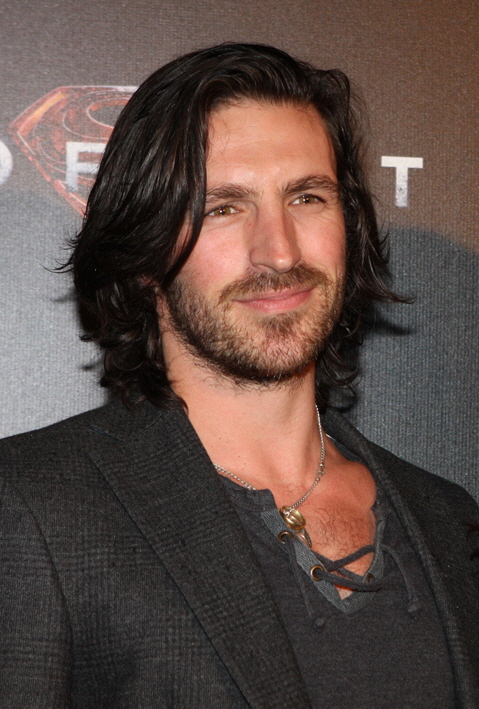
Eoin Macken

Sir Gwaine (portrayed by Eoin Macken), was the son of a knight who died in the service of his king either before Gwaine was born or when Gwaine was very young. Although Gwaine never met his father, he likes to think that he was a noble who treated his servants well, but generally held a low opinion of the nobility, believing that they saw the lower-classes as being there to do nothing more than serve them.

He met Arthur and Merlin when the two of them fought in a tavern brawl, commenting in the aftermath that he had joined the fight because he liked the odds. With Gwaine having been injured in the fight, Arthur had him brought to Camelot to treat his wounds. Although Gwaine appeared to be essentially a drunken flirt, running up at least one large tavern bill during his time in Camelot while flirting casually with Gwen, he demonstrated a strong opinion of right and wrong, stating that nobility should be defined by what they did rather than who they were by birth, as well as an exceptional ability at sword-fighting that impressed even Arthur. Although Gwaine faced execution when he fought with a thug who was posing as Sir Oswald to kill Arthur, Arthur's willingness to vouch for Gwaine's nobility of heart convinced Uther to lift the threat of execution to simple banishment, Gwaine admitting to Merlin before his departure that Arthur wasn't like other nobles, and commented to Gwen that he understood why she had turned him down after he heard her talking about Arthur.

Despite the threat of exile, Gwaine returned to infiltrate the melee the next day to assist Arthur in fighting the two thugs who sought to kill him, Arthur subsequently allowing Gwaine to claim victory in the melee even before he learned who Gwaine really was. With the thugs' true identities exposed, Gwaine was again permitted to leave Camelot rather than face execution, although Arthur apologised for Uther's actions and assured Gwaine that he had tried to convince Uther otherwise. Although Gwaine stated that he could not stay in Camelot to serve a man like Uther, he commented to Merlin as he departed that he and Arthur may fight together again.

Gwaine returned when Merlin sought his assistance when Arthur went on a quest to the realm of the Fisher King, Morgana having given Arthur an enchanted bracelet that would drain his life-energy and make him weak. When confronting the guardian of the entrance to the Fisher King's lands, the dwarf-guardian informed Gwaine that he represented the strength that the trio would require to succeed in their quest : Arthur representing courage and Merlin magic, although the other two were naturally unaware of Merlin's role in the quest – as they entered the Fisher King's realm. As Gwaine helped Arthur face the monsters in the kingdom, Merlin confronted the Fisher King prior to his death, Arthur subsequently claiming the King's trident. As Arthur and Merlin returned to Camelot, Gwaine parted company from them on the land's borders in accordance with Uther's decree, Arthur apologising to Gwaine about Uther's ruling even as Gwaine assured him that he understood.

Gwaine is reunited with Merlin and Arthur when they are captured by a slave-trader, Gwaine and Arthur staging a fight to give themselves a chance to escape (Although it was only due to Merlin's efforts that they escaped the tower anyway, Merlin using a spell to enhance a nearby torch so that it started a fire). Gwaine subsequently joined the two on their quest to recover the Cup of Life, but the Cup is lost during a subsequent attack by Cenred's forces. With Arthur wounded, Gwaine assisted Merlin in taking Arthur back to Camelot—most likely reasoning that Uther's decree can be ignored with his son's life on the line-, only to discover that Camelot has been sacked by Morgana and Morgause leading Cenred's now-immortal soldiers. During the subsequent raid on Camelot, Gwaine and his other allies are knighted by Arthur around the Round Table in recognition of their service to Camelot, Gwaine commenting before the battle that, even if they have no chance of victory, he wouldn't miss this fight for anything. He survives the battle, and is subsequently seen with the others dressed as a true knight of Camelot.

Gwaine was one of four knights who were knighted the day before the overthrow of Morgause's immortal army. Alongside him were Lancelot, Elyan and Percival. After Camelot was Uther's again, Arthur trusted his four new knights (and Leon) on every mission he went on. But there was something about Gwaine which was different.

The knights went with Arthur on many missions throughout season four. Like the mission where Arthur intended to sacrifice himself for Camelot, and where they were chasing after Julius Borden and his key to the Dragon egg. Gwaine was also part of the battle which never took place where Arthur defeated Caerleon's champion, creating peace between Arthur and Annis. Gwaine also came with Arthur to search for Merlin after he'd been ordered by Morgana to kill Arthur. Gaius then made Merlin right and Merlin destroyed Morgana's snakes which had possessed him.

When they got to the place where Merlin thought Agravaine had been going, they decided to split up. Gwaine saw somebody going along the tunnels and he followed them. After he reached the chamber which this person was going, he saw Gaius, probably unconscious and above him, Agravaine.

Gwaine quickly shouted before Agravaine could do any harm to Gaius. For a moment, Gwaine saw the traitor that Agravaine was, but then Agravaine reassured him.

At the end of season four, Agravaine guided part of Helios' army through the siege tunnels and started the attack on Camelot, and some soldiers went above on the ground. Sir Leon saw the mini army, and told Gwaine to warn Arthur that they were under attack.

Later, it became clear to Merlin that they needed to get Arthur to safety. Merlin took Arthur, and Gwaine and Gaius held them back. Eventually, Gwaine and Gaius were locked in prison.

Soon, Elyan was put in the same cell with Gwaine and Gaius. After that, Morgana made regular visits and once referred to how Gaius didn't look very good. Gwaine regularly fought against Morgana's soldiers to obtain food for Gaius, whilst Elyan cared for him. As Arthur retook Camelot, Percival and Leon freed the prisoners. The series ended with Gwen and Arthur's wedding.

Three years later, Gwaine and Percival led a garrison north to Ruadan's castle. Being forced to work in Morgana's mine, Gwaine was almost killed by Saxons. He was saved by a magical creature, and soon joined Percival, Arthur, Merlin and other captured knights in a bid for freedom. Gwaine soon became a prominent member of the round table, assisting the King and Merlin on a number of quests. Episode 12 saw him have a short relationship with the refugee Eira. She turned out to be working for Morgana, and was soon executed – to the obvious pain of Gwaine. He escorted Merlin to the crystal cave, saying his final goodbyes. Despite the legend, he survived the battle of Camlann, and he and Percival rode out to kill Morgana. Although they both killed several Saxons, Gwaine was captured, and tortured to death, so Morgana could find where the wounded Arthur was heading. Percival arrived too late to save him, having broken free of his bindings after hearing Gwaine's screams. His final words were "I've failed." Although his actions did indeed prevent Arthur reaching the Lake of Avalon in time, peace was brought about when Merlin killed Morgana.

=== Geoffrey of Monmouth ===
Geoffrey of Monmouth (portrayed by Michael Cronin) is Uther's court genealogist, keeper of Camelot's Library and an old friend to Gaius. He provided the Camelot records to Gaius which revealed the true identity of Edwin Muirden. He also provided the book of legends to Merlin which gave Merlin the idea of the sword that could kill the undead Black Knight. He also holds a central position in great ceremonies of state, having presided over handfastings for both Uther and Arthur (the latter not having been completed), and the crowning of Morgana as Queen of Camelot as well as Arthur's own coronation as King. Geoffrey has no personal connection to any of the Pendragon family or the castle inhabitants.

=== George ===
George (portrayed by Leander Deeny) is a servant in Camelot. He is efficient, smart and very good at doing chores. He temporarily replaces Merlin as Prince Arthur's manservant after Merlin goes missing.

Whilst being a talented manservant, George's social skills are less than polished. His main love in life apart from serving appears to be brass. He has an unfortunate habit, according to Arthur, of making up jokes about it. He also appears to be very formal, a state of affairs Arthur is not used to from Merlin. As such, he finds George very irritating. Also, despite his politeness and decorum, George is very prideful and this leads him to be rather sensitive to any criticism (positive or negative) over his work, which is evident by the way he appeared to be hurt when Arthur refused his assistance, or the conceited glare he gives to Merlin when Arthur praised his capabilities.

=== Gilli ===
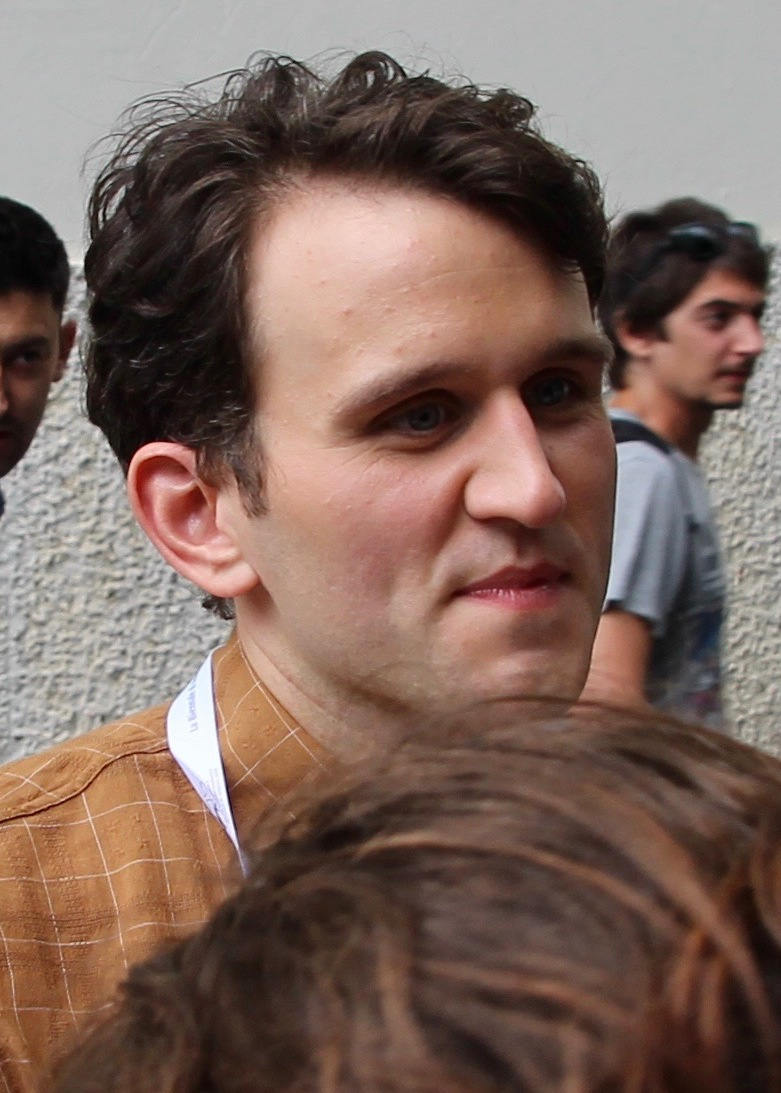
Harry Melling

Gilli (portrayed by Harry Melling) is a young man who attempted to participate in the tournament of Camelot, secretly using his magic to prevail in the tournament. When Merlin spoke with him about his use of magic, he explained that his father had been a sorcerer himself, but had never used his magic out of fear. Gilli decides to compete in the tournament using his full range of skills, his magic being focused through a ring that his father had once possessed. But Merlin attempted to convince Gilli to withdraw from the tournament before anyone got hurt. Gilli, however, refused to do so, even after he unintentionally killed his latest opponent, believing that killing Uther would be for the best for all their kind. Knowing that it would be impossible to convince Arthur to work to restore magic to Camelot if magic was used to kill his father, Merlin subtly aided Uther in the fight against Gilli by arranging for Gilli's sword to be stuck in Uther's shield, allowing Uther to prevail. When Merlin confronted Gilli about his attempt to kill Uther, even though he had been about to win the tournament, Gilli acknowledged that he had been wrong. Gilli recognized that his father had disdained magic not out of fear of his power, but out of fear of its ability to corrupt. Acknowledging the wisdom of Merlin's advice to keep his powers secret until the day came when magic would once again be welcomed in Camelot, Gilli departed the kingdom, leaving Merlin reflecting that the two would meet again when magic was once again permitted.

=== Great Dragon ===
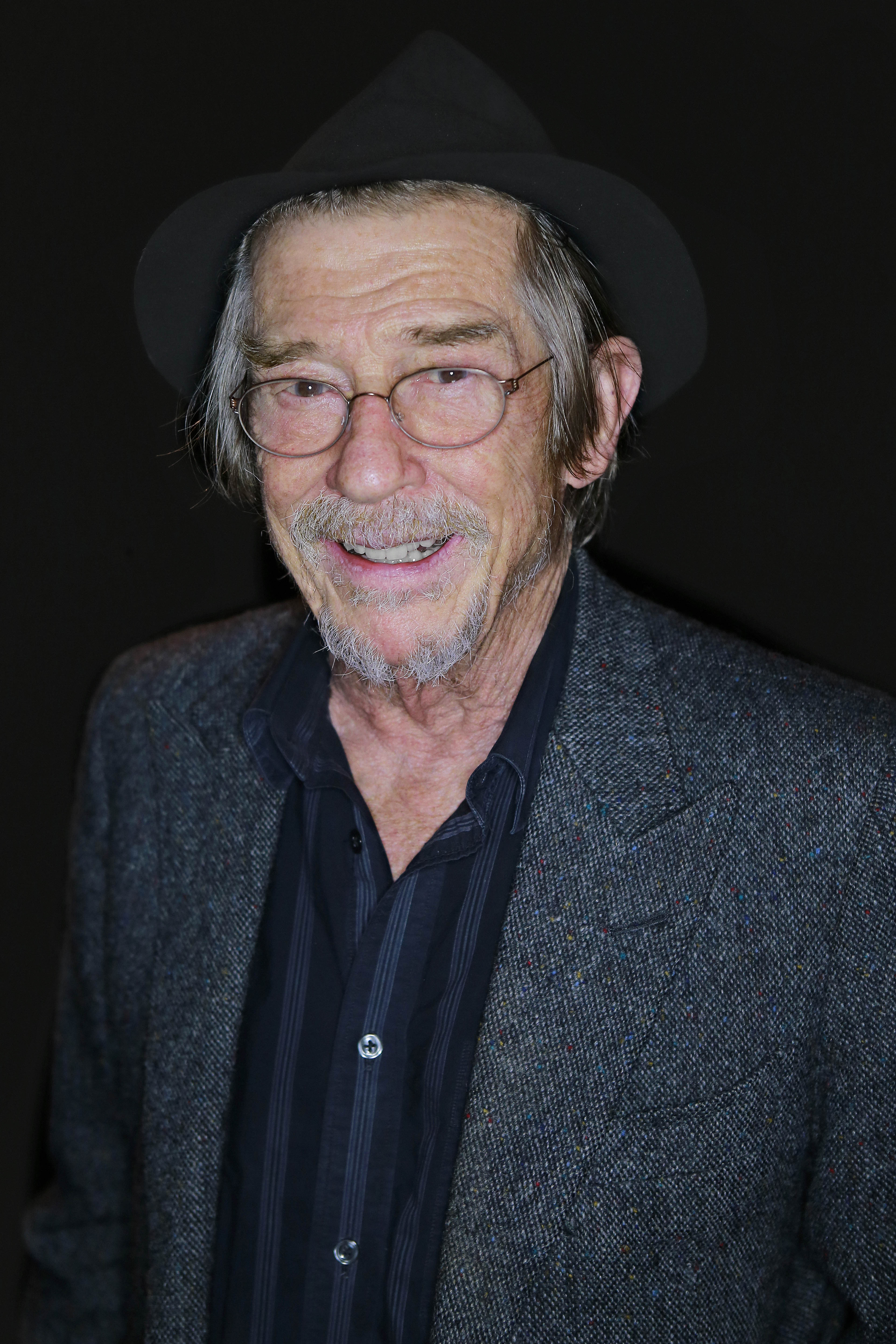
John Hurt

The Great Dragon (voiced by John Hurt), also known as Kilgharrah, is a legendary dragon that was imprisoned in Series One and Series Two in the caves by King Uther Pendragon. Twenty years prior to the events of the series, Uther had outlawed magic and killed every dragon (in Camelot) but one, whom he spared to serve as an example. Upon arriving at Camelot, Merlin is haunted by a voice and finds the source to be the Great Dragon. The mysterious creature becomes Merlin's mentor in magic, telling him he is destined to be Arthur's protector as he unites the land of Albion. In the finale of the first series, the Great Dragon told Merlin that he was mainly thinking of his own freedom when on the occasions he helped Merlin, but because the Dragon's machinations nearly killed Merlin's mother, Merlin vows that it will never be freed. Merlin turned his back on the Dragon, but was later forced to return for aid in stopping the spirit of an ancient sorcerer. In exchange for teaching Merlin a powerful spell, the Dragon forces Merlin to promise that he will one day be freed. This crisis also revealed that Gaius was aware of Merlin's visits to the Dragon.

Although the Dragon can appear cold and cynical, such as when he ordered Merlin not to help or trust Morgana and Mordred, he has shown a certain compassion and sincerity; such as when he apologized for his inability to help Merlin save Gaius from the Witchfinder. Most of his inaction appears to be dictated by his concern about the future; he even sided with Merlin in freeing Uther from a troll enchantment, despite the old magical ties between the two races. He has also demonstrated a sense of humor, initially laughing upon learning of Uther and Arthur's magically induced love for the ladies Catrina and Vivian respectively.

Upon gaining access to a prophetic crystal, Merlin sees a future where the Dragon will destroy Camelot once he is freed; although Gaius assures him that it may be one of many, Merlin is clearly haunted by the possibility of this coming to pass. However, when a sickness renders Camelot asleep in the face of an attack by the deadly Knights of Medhir, the dragon forces Merlin's hand by demanding he honour his promise in exchange for knowledge. Merlin then uses his magic in combination with a sword of Medhir to break the chains holding him beneath Camelot. As Merlin looks on hopefully, the Great Dragon flew in an obvious rage, subsequently attacking Camelot at night for the next three days in revenge for the slaughter of his kind including his family.

With no other way to save the kingdom – conventional weapons and Merlin's magic prove useless – Uther agrees with Gaius's suggestion that they call on the aid of the presumed-dead last dragonlord, Balinor, and Merlin learns this man was his father. According to Balinor, the Great Dragon was known to all Dragonlords as Kilgharrah. After inheriting Balinor's power upon his father's death, Merlin was able to command the Dragon and, it is implied, gained the necessary magic to hurt him, but, instead of killing him, Merlin ordered the Dragon to leave Camelot. Noting that Merlin's clemency reflected what he would become in future, the Dragon agreed, speculating that his and Merlin's paths will cross again.

The Dragon returns at the beginning of the third series, saving a chained Merlin from several Serkets summoned by Morgause (Merlin's magic was ineffective against the chains). After helping Merlin recover, the Dragon consoled him about Morgana's defection. The Dragon subsequently flew Merlin back to the outskirts of Camelot. Although the Dragon returned when Merlin asked him how to cure Morgana after she sustained a fatal head injury, he made it clear that he disapproved of Merlin's decision, informing Merlin that this 'abuse' of his power would not be without consequences and all the evil Morgana did in the future would be his own fault. Despite the harsh nature of this meeting, in their next encounter, when Merlin sought advice about a young boy planning to use magic against Uther in a dangerous tournament, the Dragon showed sympathy for Merlin, reflecting that seeing another of their kind die was always hard, but recognised that Merlin could not allow Uther to die at the hands of magic due to the impact it would have on Arthur. When Morgana unleashed an immortal army on Camelot, Merlin asked the Dragon to take him to the Lake of Avalon to recover Excalibur to use it against the army, and the Dragon assured Merlin that he would always aid him despite his apparent annoyance at being used as a 'horse'. He advises Merlin to keep Excalibur out of the hands of evil once he has retrieved it. Merlin consequently places it inside a stone.

He returns at the beginning of the fourth season to help Merlin fight the Dorocha spirits released by Morgana. He then shows huge respect to Lancelot, telling him that he will be the greatest of all Camelot's knights. Shortly afterwards, Lancelot willingly gives up his life to end the threat of the Dorocha. When the mysterious hunter Julius Borden returned to Camelot to search for a dragon's egg, the Dragon warns Merlin to save it before Borden does any harm. Merlin eventually saves the egg and hatches it, naming the new dragon Aithusa. When Morgana takes over Camelot with the warlord Helios, Merlin, Arthur, Gwen and two smugglers (Tristan and Isolde) are attacked by Agravaine and his army in Ealdor. Hopelessly outnumbered, Merlin calls the Dragon who attacks Agravaine and his soldiers. After killing Agravaine, Merlin visits the Dragon for help in assisting Arthur (devastated after the betrayal of Agravaine) in proving to himself that he can be the king that Camelot so desperately needs. Kilgharrah says that the destiny of Albion and Arthur lies only in Merlin's hands, inspiring him to have Arthur draw Excalibur from the stone.

In the fifth series, Merlin only calls on the Great Dragon as a last resort, as Morgana relies on trickery as much as magic in her plots against Camelot. When he summons Kilgharrah in the tenth episode, the dragon appears visibly injured as he helps Merlin evade Morgana. When questioned, he explains his time is drawing to a close. In the final episode, he helps Merlin one last time by flying Merlin and Arthur to the isles of Avalon and confirms Arthur is dead. To Merlin, Kilgharrah says that "in Albion's (United Kingdom) greatest need Arthur will rise again to fulfil his destiny", then Kilgharrah flies off and is not seen again.

The character is original to the television series, not existing in any previous Arthurian legend, although several tales exist of Merlin associating with dragons, particularly Dinas Emrys. Also, a clearly different 'Great Dragon' appears in the 1998 film, Merlin, to whom Nimueh is almost sacrificed.

=== Grettir ===
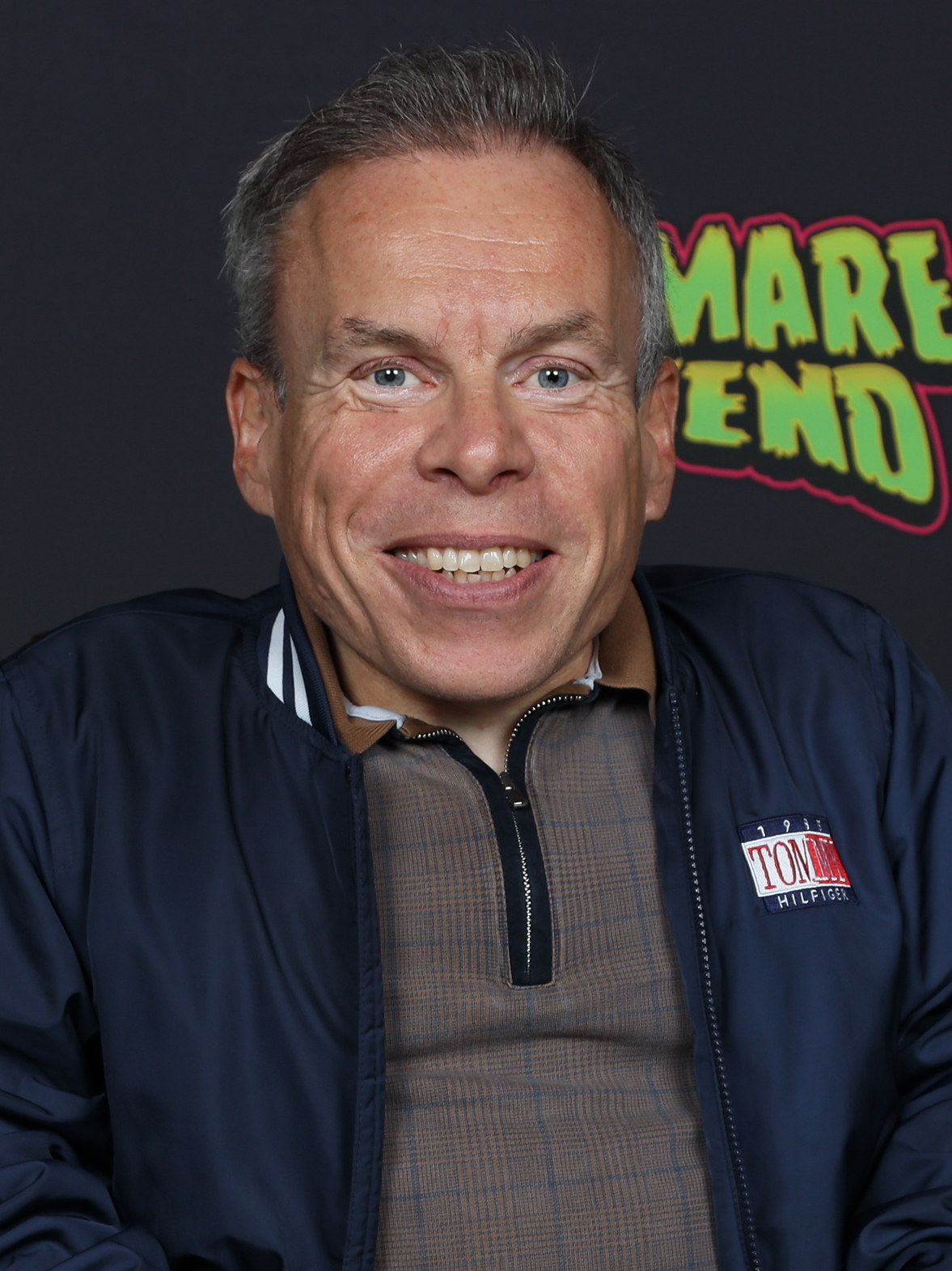
Warwick Davis

Grettir (portrayed by Warwick Davis) Grettir is a mysterious dwarf Warlock who has many unknown powers.

Grettir guarded the bridge leading the way to The Fisher King's kingdom and anticipated the arrival of Arthur Pendragon, Merlin, and Gwaine. He desired the Fisher King's kingdom to be returned to its former glory. When Arthur first arrived alone, Grettir met him on the bridge and knew him at once, referring to him as Courage. He also inquired as to the whereabouts of Magic and Strength, demonstrating some element of foresight as these were later shown to be Merlin and Gwaine respectively.

When Arthur crossed the bridge on his quest for the Trident, Grettir noticed the Phoenix Eye on his wrist and was evidently aware of its true purpose, though he made no attempt to warn Arthur of its detrimental effect. He casually asked about it, and Arthur stated that the bracelet was the token of someone dear to him, but Grettir did not set him straight and laughed before disappearing. He then met Merlin and Gwaine when they followed Arthur to save him from the Phoenix Eye, identifying them as Magic and Strength.

Grettir was exceptionally skilled in the magical arts as he was able to turn Gwaine's sword into a flower and back again when he was threatened as well as disappearing and reappearing and he may have some powers in foresight (The Eye of the Phoenix).

=== Grunhilda ===
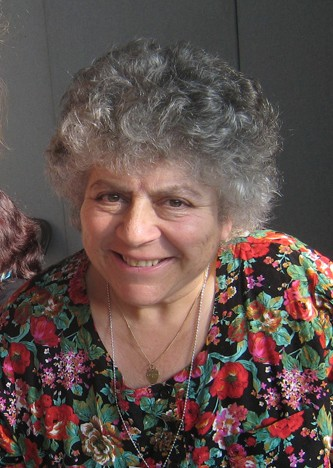
Miriam Margolyes

Grunhilda (portrayed by Miriam Margolyes) was a pixie who served as the nanny to Princess Elena, a changeling child who had been 'implanted' with a Sidhe when she was an infant, knowing that Elena's father, Lord Godwyn, would eventually seek to strengthen the ties between his kingdom and Camelot with a marriage between Elena and Arthur, and seeking to place a Sidhe queen on Camelot's throne. Grunhilda's true nature was uncovered by Merlin and Gaius, Merlin subsequently destroying Grunhilda in a duel—although she was able to take an exceptional amount of damage from Merlin's staff, (the staff he had kept from "The Gates of Avalon",) before dying—while Gaius prepared a potion to expel the Sidhe from Elena. Grunhilda developed a 'liking' for Gaius, to his and Merlin's disgust. Gaius tried to avoid her romance as much as possible. He thought of her as short, fat and grubby. When they made a potion for Elena they had to use Gaius as bait to keep Grunhilda away from her so then they could give Elena the potion without Grunhilda seeing.

=== Guinevere ("Gwen") ===
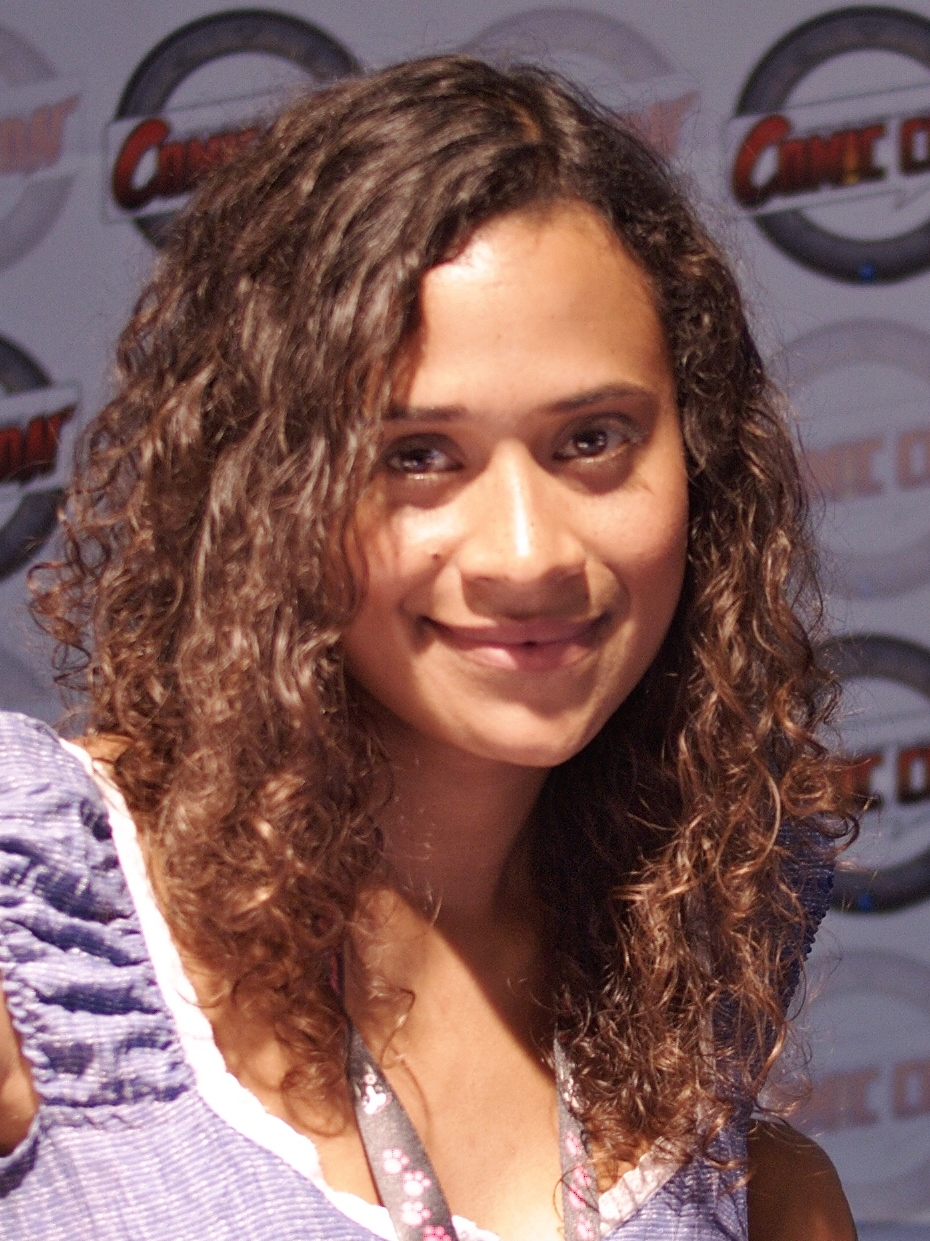
Angel Coulby

Guinevere ("Gwen"; portrayed by Angel Coulby) enters the story as Lady Morgana's personal servant, eventually falling in love with and marrying King Arthur, thus becoming Queen of Camelot. She is also the only daughter of Tom, sister to Elyan and daughter-in-law to Uther Pendragon.

Guinevere is sweet, gentle, intelligent, brave and trustworthy. Morgana once described her as 'the most kind and loyal person you would ever meet' and Merlin said 'no-one would sacrifice more for Camelot or for you [Arthur] than Gwen.'

In Season 1, Gwen is shown to be a friendly and dedicated maidservant to Lady Morgana, as well as a loyal friend. She is impressed by Merlin's bravery at standing up to Prince Arthur, whom she agrees is arrogant and pigheaded. Her feelings for Merlin begin to grow and she briefly kisses him in "The Poisoned Chalice". However, Merlin doesn't reciprocate her feelings and any romance between the two is quickly abandoned, replaced by a strong friendship. In episode 12, 'To Kill the King', Gwen's father is executed for sorcery. Arthur apologizes to Gwen, promising that her job is secure and her home will always be hers, and offering to give her anything she might need. A grief-stricken and bewildered Gwen thanks Arthur. In the Season 1 finale, when Arthur is struck by the Questing Beast, Gwen tends to an unconscious Arthur, telling him he has to live so he can grow into the "man she sees inside" who will one day rule Camelot. After Arthur recovers, we learn that he heard her speaking to him.

Season 2 sees Gwen firmly over her brief feelings for Merlin, as she navigates the growing affections between her and Prince Arthur, who begins to change his selfish ways thanks to Gwen's influence, most notably when he stays with her in 'The Once and Future Queen', during which the two share their first kiss. However, Arthur knows his father would never approve and the two sadly agree their romance cannot go further, although a hopeful Gwen tells Arthur when he is King, things could be different.

Things get complicated for Gwen when she is kidnapped by brutish mercenaries and forced to impersonate Morgana, so Uther will pay a ransom for her freedom. Whilst in captivity, she is reunited with her past flame, Lancelot, and old feelings start to reignite. Arthur, who has come to rescue her with Merlin, notices this and is quietly saddened. Whilst Gwen sleeps, Lancelot tells Merlin, despite his deep love for Gwen, he will not stand between her and Arthur's budding romance. He leaves, and Gwen is visibly heartbroken.

Gwen continues to be charmed and impressed by Arthur's growth from arrogant prince to selfless and devoted future King. She comforts him on multiple occasions, and reassures him when Arthur doubts his father's love for him. Her faith in Arthur and the great king she believes he will one day be is a source of strength and pride for the young Prince and their relationship flourishes, amidst outside interference.

When King Alined arrives in Camelot to sign a peace treaty, he uses magic to make Arthur fall in love with a fellow King's beautiful daughter, Princess Vivian, hoping for a disagreement to break out and a war to start. Gwen is left heartbroken when she witnesses Arthur's apparent love for Vivian, unaware Arthur is under a spell. Following Merlin's instruction, Gwen hastily kisses Arthur, breaking the enchantment as his one true love. Arthur later apologises to Gwen for his actions whilst under the influence of the spell and boldly claims she is the only woman he has ever loved. Gwen is relieved to hear this, but, after comparing herself to a princess like Vivian, Gwen tells Arthur she can never be his queen. Arthur refuses to believe their relationship is impossible and promises things can change, mirroring Gwen's beliefs earlier in the series.

During the battle against Kilgharrah, Gwen tends to Arthur's wounds and berates him for putting himself in danger for her. Arthur says he would never let anything happen to her and the two share a tender moment, witnessed only by an amused Gaius. Later in the episode, Gaius reveals he is aware of Arthur's feelings for Gwen and her feelings in turn. He tells Gwen to never underestimate the power of love, and him and Merlin later watch as Gwen embraces Arthur when he returns safe.

When her estranged brother, Elyan, is captured by Cenred, Gwen finds herself forced to lure Arthur into a trap. Following these events and having ensured Arthur and Elyan's safety, Gwen and Arthur seem to begin a secret relationship. He kisses her before heading off on his coming of age quest to the Perilous Lands.

In Season 3, the 'Queen of Hearts' episode is purely about Arthur's love for Gwen. Having had a prophetic vision of Gwen as Queen of Camelot, Morgana sets them up on a romantic picnic outside Camelot only to deliberately ride there with Uther, exposing their romance. Uther tells Arthur messing around with a serving girl is unacceptable for the future King and forbids the relationship. To further incriminate Gwen, Morgana plants a poultice under Arthur's pillow and cunningly suggests Arthur has been enchanted. Uther sentences Gwen to death, and a distraught Arthur begs his father for mercy. As Gwen is escorted out, Arthur grabs her and kisses her, promising he will always love her - the first major show of affection between the two.

Fortunately, Merlin is able to clear Gwen of this crime by using an aging spell to give himself the appearance of an elderly sorcerer who enchanted both Gwen and Arthur to cause chaos in Camelot, the two subsequently agreeing to keep their feelings secret until Arthur is King and can change the laws that currently prevent them from being together.

During Morgana's subsequent conquest of Camelot, Gwen feigned continued loyalty to her mistress in order to wait for an opportunity to assist Arthur, eventually managing to sneak Sir Leon out of Camelot so that the two of them could join Arthur and his small band of knights. Although Gwen was briefly reunited with Lancelot, she now appears more secure in her relationship with Arthur, kissing him before he departed for the raid on Camelot, the two sharing another kiss in front of everyone when Gwen rode into Camelot alongside the new Knights of the Round Table.

In the episode 'Lancelot du Lac', Arthur informs Agravaine he intends to make Guinevere his queen, despite her being a servant. Merlin helps him propose, to which a delighted Gwen agrees. Camelot celebrates the upcoming wedding with a joust in honour of the future Queen, but everything changes when Lancelot is revealed to be among them, having been brought back from the dead by Morgana. Gwen is bewitched by a cursed bracelet, forcing her to reignite her old feelings for Lancelot. The wedding is ultimately called off when Arthur witnesses the pair kissing. Heartbroken and furious, he exiles Gwen and bans her name from being spoken in court.

She is mentioned next in 'The Hunter's Heart', where she is living in a neighbouring village in exile. She wears Arthur's engagement ring around her neck, and it's clear she still loves him. When she is captured by Helios after he admires her beauty, she overhears Morgana's plans to kill Arthur and take over Camelot. After she escapes, Morgana turns her into a doe, one hunted by an oblivious Arthur and the beautiful Princess Mithian, whom he is to marry for political reasons. During the hunt, Arthur finds his engagement ring on the floor and is forced to accept he still loves Gwen. Merlin sees through the enchantment and tends to Gwen after she is wounded. She tearfully tells Merlin she can never face Arthur again, but informs Merlin of Morgana's plans. Meanwhile, Arthur calls of the betrothal with Princess Mithian, but still expresses doubt to Merlin about a future with Gwen.

In "The Sword In The Stone", Morgana takes over Camelot, forcing Arthur and Merlin to retreat to Merlin's hometown of Ealdor, where Gwen is staying. Arthur is reunited with her and they share a brief embrace, before he remembers her 'betrayal' and shuts her out. He repeatedly gives her the cold shoulder, masking his heartbreak until she tells him she knows he can never forgive her for her betrayal, but she never stopped loving him. Ultimately, it is the death of Isolde - a mercenary who fights alongside the group as they attempt to take back Camelot - and the grief her devoted husband shows that pushes Arthur to realize he want to be with Gwen. After they win back the kingdom, he proposes to her again, telling her he doesn't want to lose her a second time. Gwen emotionally accepts, replying 'yes, yes with all my heart!' She marries Arthur and is officially crowned Queen of Camelot, amidst cheers of support (chief amongst them, Merlin).

In Season 5, Gwen has been ruling benevolently as Camelot's queen alongside Arthur for three years. She is kidnapped and psychologically tortured by Morgana in 'The Dark Tower', and used as bait to lure Arthur into a deadly trap. Unfortunately, it is her brother, Elyan, who is killed instead and Gwen is bewitched to become Morgana's puppet. The following two episodes - 'A Lesson In Vengeance' and 'The Hollow Queen' - centre on Gwen's corruption and her newfound desire to murder Arthur, sparking Merlin's suspicions. Ultimately, Arthur learns the truth about his queen and in 'With All My Heart' he travels to the Cauldron of Arianrod with Merlin and Mordred to magically cleanse Gwen's soul of Morgana's evil, a feat which can only be achieved by reaching into Gwen's pure heart and reminding her of their true love. The title of the episode, and the phrase which ultimately gets through to Gwen, is a reference to her reply when Arthur proposed to her a second time last series.

In the final two episodes of the show, Gwen joins Arthur on the battlefield of Camlann, providing Arthur with moral support and tending to fallen soldiers. During the battle, Arthur is fatally wounded and sends the Royal Seal to Gwen via Gaius, stating he 'can think of no one better to succeed him'. Gwen is devastated when news reaches Camelot of Arthur's death, but she succeeds her husband and becomes queen regnant of Camelot. It is also hinted that Gwen figures out Merlin is a warlock and has been using magic to protect Arthur all this time. She smiles and seems to accept this wholeheartedly.

== H ==
=== Helen of Mora ===
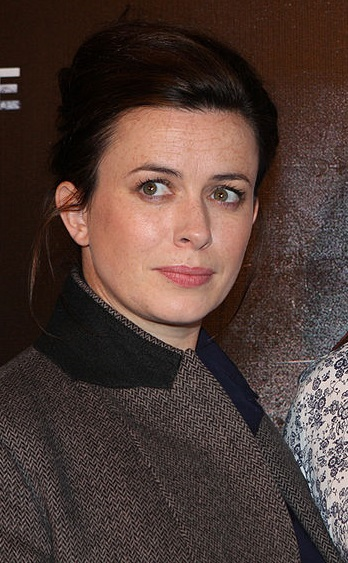
Eve Myles

Lady Helen of Mora (portrayed by Eve Myles) was a famous singer who was on her way to Camelot to perform at King Uther's festival, until she was possessed and killed by Mary Collins using poppet magic. Collins then assumed Lady Helen's appearance, also serving as a romantic interest to King Uther Pendragon, in an attempt to kill Prince Arthur, but Merlin saves his life by using magic and becomes his manservant.

=== Helios ===
Helios (portrayed by Terence Maynard) was a warlord from the southern kingdoms who helped Morgana to overthrow Camelot in episodes 11-13 of series 4. He was killed by Isolde (a smuggler who, with her husband Tristan gave Merlin and Arthur shelter during their escape from Camelot) during a duel with Arthur, but not before stabbing Isolde in the stomach, fatally wounding and later killing her.

=== Hunith ===
Hunith (portrayed by Caroline Faber) is the mother of Merlin. She sends him to Camelot hoping that he will be able to develop his magical talents, but he soon discovers that the use of sorcery there is expressly forbidden and punishable with death. Hunith is an old friend of Gaius, they met when he helped Merlin's father escape from Uther's clutches because he was a dragon lord, so she wrote to him asking him to take care of her son. Merlin later returns to her when their village is attacked by raiders. She also appears in the last episode when Nimueh breaks a deal with Merlin to take his life and tries to take Hunith's instead. This fails when Merlin slays Nimueh with magic. Hunith returns in "The Sword in the Stone Part 1" at her and Merlin's hometown Ealdor, where Merlin, Arthur, Gwen, Tristan, Isolde were hiding from Agravaine and his men. Agravaine found them so Arthur could no longer remain in Ealdor.

It is revealed in "The Last Dragonlord" that she cared for the fugitive dragonlord Balinor, who turns out to be Merlin's father.

== I ==
=== Isolde ===
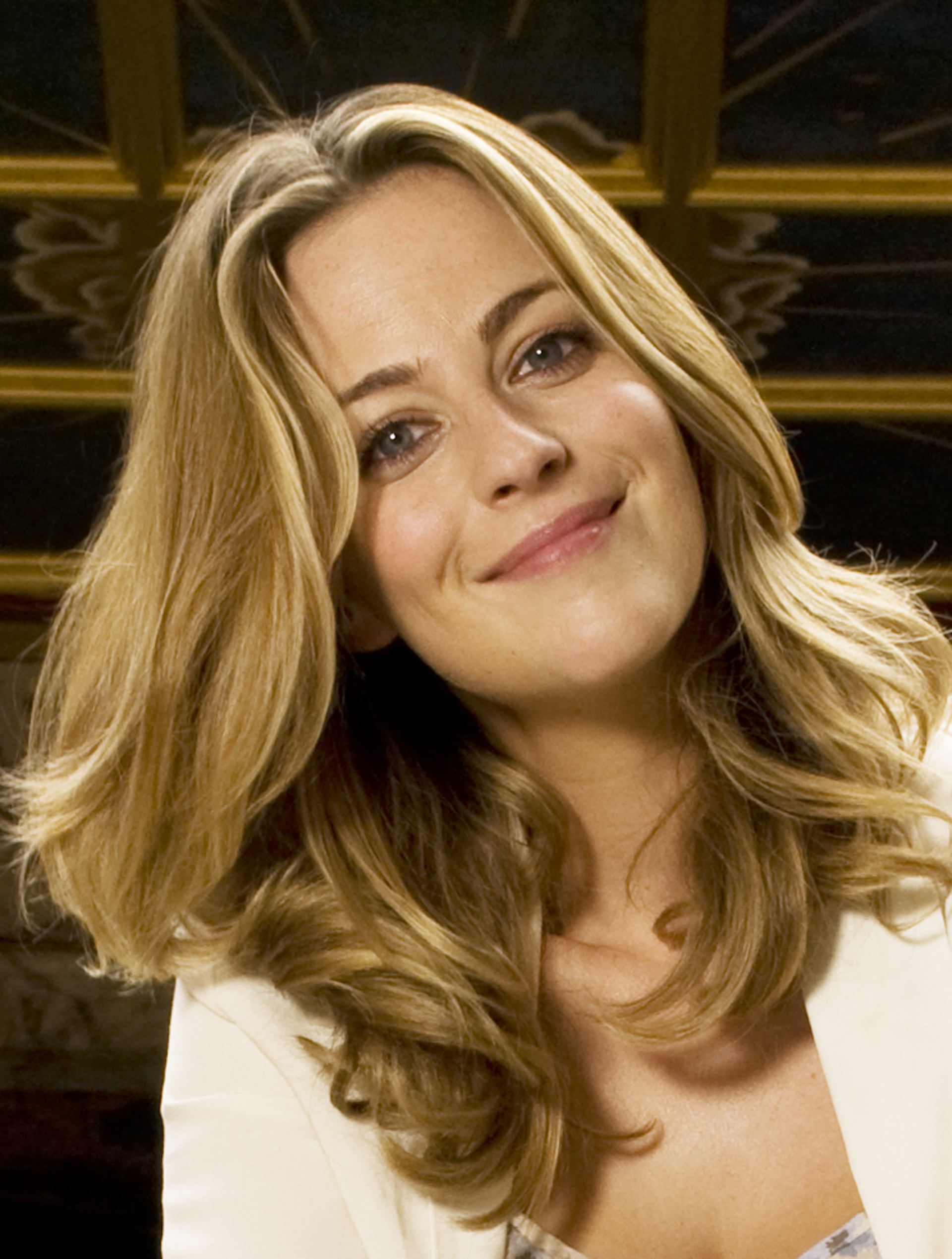
Miranda Raison

Isolde (portrayed by Miranda Raison) was a smuggler along with partner Tristan. She discovers Merlin and Arthur (who is under one of Merlin's spells) and holds a sword up to them. After taking them to her partner in crime, Tristan, and they are allowed to venture with the two smugglers for the time being. When they are invaded by bandits, Arthur, who has been relieved of Merlin's spell, saves them. Isolde fights with a bandit behind her and it results in a slash in her arm. Merlin treats her for her injury but is made better by Merlin when they reach Ealdor. As Agravaine and his men have found them at Ealdor, Isolde runs and hides in the woods along with Guinevere, Merlin, Arthur and Tristan. They venture to Camelot to take back what is rightfully Arthur's which results in Isolde's death. She dies in Tristan's arms as he reveals his love for her with a kiss upon her lips after she dies.

== J ==
=== Jarl ===
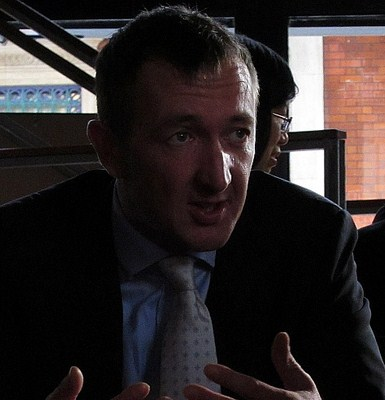
Ralph Ineson

Jarl (portrayed by Ralph Ineson) is a slave trader appearing in the Series 3's penultimate episode; The Coming of Arthur: Part One. Jarl forces Arthur and Gwaine to fight each other to the death, with the two only surviving thanks to Merlin setting a fire allowing them to escape Jarl's holdout in the ruins of a castle. After they escape, Jarl discovers Arthur's identity, and informs Cenred who he has a, to quote Cenred, "understanding" with, as they don't bother each other, however Jarl is killed by Morgause, via her magic, when he asks for a reward for his information.

=== Jonas ===
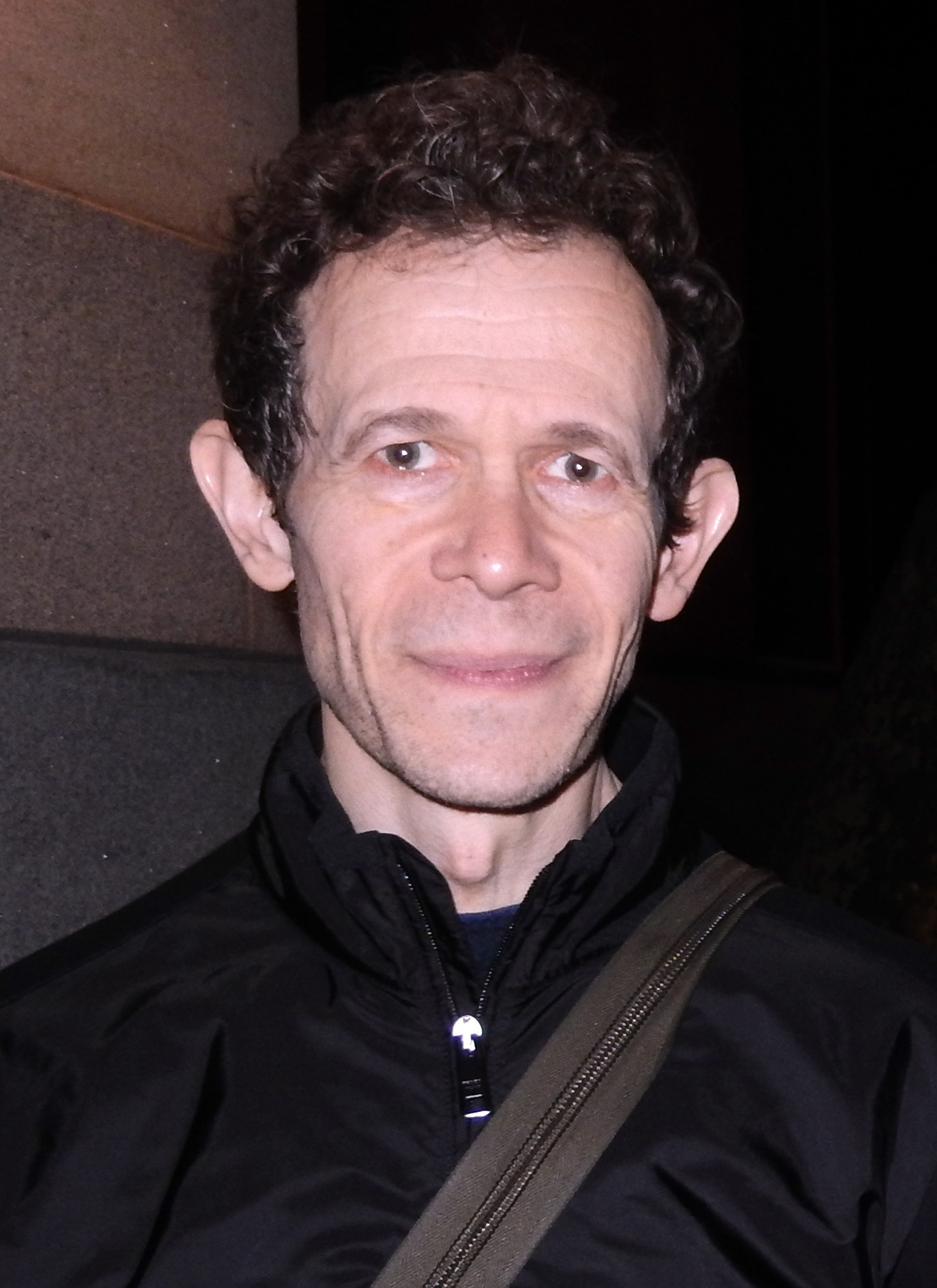
Adam Godley

Jonas (portrayed by Adam Godley) is the servant of the troll who magically impersonated Lady Catrina. Jonas is discovered not to be human, as he Merlin finds out that he has a green, reptilian like tail, however the show never stats what species he is, only that he not a human or a troll. He is ultimately killed by Arthur while trying to save his mistress who is also killed by Arthur.

Appearances: Beauty and the Beast: Part One, and Beauty and the Beast: Part Two (Series 2, Episode 5 and 6).

=== Julius Borden ===
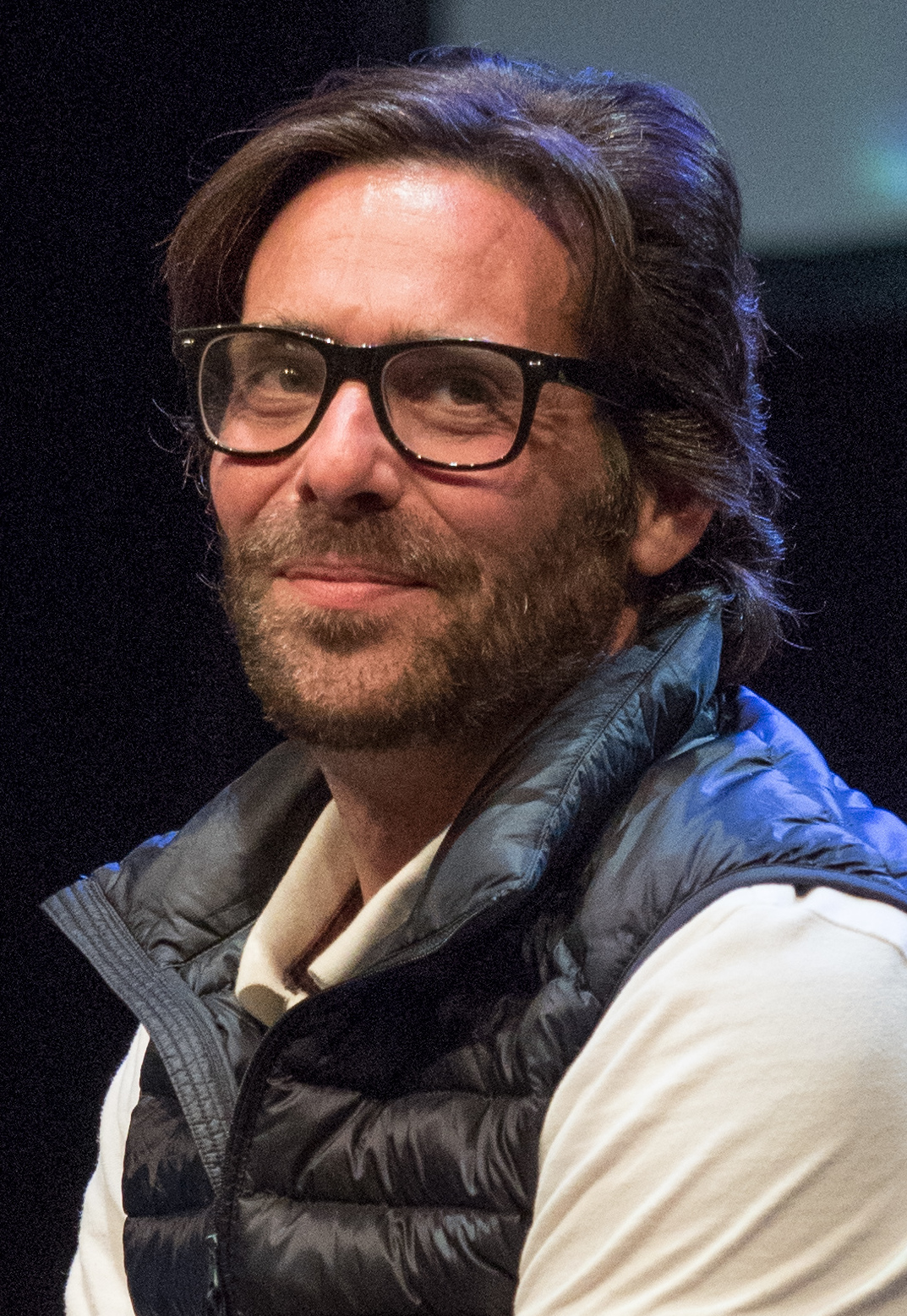
James Callis

Julius Borden (portrayed by James Callis) used to be a pupil of Gaius, before they parted during the Great Purge leaving Gaius in trouble. Later he mysteriously returns to Camelot with news of a magical secret that threatens to change the landscape of the kingdom forever. He has located the final part of a key to the tomb of Ashkanar, an ancient mausoleum which holds a very special treasure: the last remaining dragon's egg. Merlin is understandably drawn in by Borden's news, and promises to help him. However, he only wants to the egg for the sake of power. He threatens Merlin's life to achieve this, but the warlock seriously injures him with magic, and he is presumed dead after the tomb collapses.

== K ==
=== Kilgharrah ===
See: Great Dragon.

=== Kara ===
Kara (portrayed by Alexandra Dowling) was a druid girl and Mordred's love interest, and possibly, childhood friend. Her only appearance was "Drawing of the Dark". Kara was part of a Saxon cohort which attacked a supply wagon headed for Camelot under the orders of Morgana Pendragon, whose cause Kara was dedicated to as she believed Morgana fought for the freedom of those with magic. Mordred saw Kara flee the scene of the Saxon attack and later met her in a forest and helped heal Kara's wound. She was stunned by the fact that he was a knight of Camelot and used him in her attempt to kill the King. Mordred tried to break Kara out of prison, but the two were caught.

Kara was put on trial before Arthur and the court, where she proudly admitted her role in the Saxon attack, her loyalty to Morgana and her desire to help Morgana in destroying Camelot and Arthur as revenge for how the Pendragon rule had persecuted many of Kara's loved ones. Arthur offered Kara a reprieve from her death sentence at Merlin's urging if she repented her crimes, but she was blinded by her beliefs and saw Arthur as no better than Uther. She therefore refused was hanged. Her execution resulted in Mordred's defection to Morgana and the Saxons, bringing about their foretold alliance.

== L ==
=== Lancelot ===
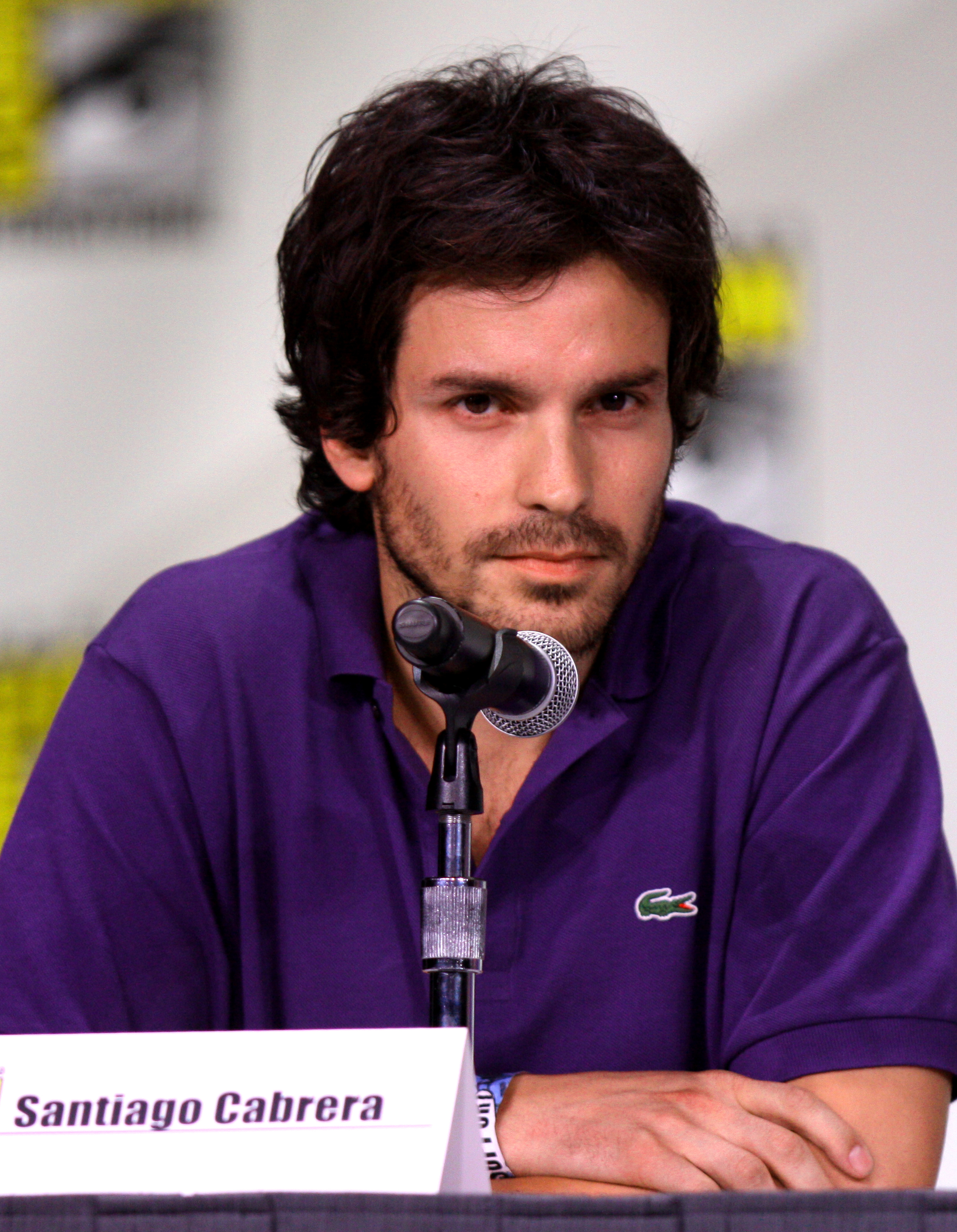
Santiago Cabrera

Lancelot (portrayed by Santiago Cabrera) was a commoner who later achieved the rank of Knight of Camelot. When his family was killed by bandits, he swore to become a skilled swordsman to fight against tyranny and save other families from suffering the same fate as his own. In the first series episode "Lancelot", he travelled to Camelot in the hope of becoming a knight of Camelot. After saving Merlin's life from a rampaging griffin, the warlock promised to help the other man achieve his goal. This would prove difficult since according to the knight's code of Camelot, only noblemen could become knights. Merlin soon forged a seal of nobility and introduced Lancelot to Guinevere, who helped by creating clothes suitable for the son of a lord.

Shortly thereafter, Merlin then introduced Lancelot to Arthur, who, after a rocky beginning, eventually agreed to test Lancelot's skills and consider him for a knighthood. After another attack by the griffin, Arthur sped up Lancelot's training in order for him to join the other knights in the coming battle against the creature. However, Merlin and Lancelot's deception was quickly discovered by Uther, who knew the man that Lancelot was claiming was his father, and the king ordered Lancelot's arrest. Arthur, however, released him shortly thereafter, admitting that Lancelot fights like a knight despite his lack of the other necessary 'qualifications'. Lancelot then followed Arthur into battle against the griffin and with the help of Merlin, defeated the creature with an enchanted lance. In the aftermath of the battle, Uther reluctantly considered restoring Lancelot's knighthood, but the man refused the honour, since he did not wish to take full credit for destroying the griffin when Merlin's contribution was so critical. Determined to prove himself worthy on his own terms, Lancelot departed Camelot after promising to keep the secret of Merlin's magic.

Lancelot's life after leaving Camelot was not an easy one, and he was forced to sell his sword skills for the entertainment of others. This activity led him to come into contact again with Guinevere, who had been abducted by the henchmen of the warlord Hengist in the second series episode "Lancelot and Guinevere". His reunion with Gwen brought up the brief attraction the two had shared during their first meeting, though Lancelot was ashamed of his situation and seemed to have lost any hope of ever achieving anything better in life. Nonetheless, he promised to rescue Gwen and regained some sense of self-worth when she told him that he was "all that [was] right with the world".

Lancelot was eventually able to free the captive Gwen and led her through the lower levels of Hengist's stronghold while being pursued by several of the warlord's followers. He urged her to leave him behind while he fought them off and Gwen ran, though not before swearing to him that her feelings for him "would never fade". Lancelot was subsequently captured and sentenced to be eaten by the Wilddeoren Hengist kept. Gwen too was recaptured before she could escape. Before they could be killed, however, they were rescued by Arthur and Merlin, who had come seeking Gwen. The obvious bond that had grown between Lancelot and Gwen caused some jealousy from Arthur, who was also developing feelings for her. Lancelot noticed this and decided to leave, considering Arthur more worthy of Gwen's hand. He departed without saying goodbye, asking Merlin to tell her that "some things can never be". He would not return to Camelot for some years.

Presumably in the years that followed, Lancelot travelled throughout Albion. He eventually acquired the friendship and companionship of Percival. In the third series finale, The Coming of Arthur, Part Two, the two men travelled to Camelot when Lancelot received a message from Merlin, requesting aid following Morgana and Morgause's takeover of the kingdom with an army of immortal soldiers. They arrived just in time to save Merlin, Arthur, Gwen, and several of their friends from an attack led by Morgause and several immortal soldiers. In the hours that followed, Lancelot swore to stand and fight beside Arthur in recognition of the lessons the prince had taught him about the honour involved in being a knight, and also stating that he believed in the world that Arthur would build once he became king. Lancelot was subsequently made a knight again, this time along with Percival, Elyan, and Gwaine.

In the ensuing battle to retake Camelot, Lancelot accompanied Merlin when the warlock set off to empty the Cup of Life of the blood that made Morgana and Morgause's army immortal. He and Merlin fought fiercely together, and Lancelot was eventually wounded in the chamber that housed the Cup. Nonetheless, he survived the battle and gained a permanent home and status as a knight in Camelot.

In the premiere episode of the fourth series, "The Darkest Hour", Lancelot still held his position as a knight and was one of those who accompanied Arthur in the quest to close the veil between the realms of the living and the dead, which had been torn open by Morgana in her quest for revenge against Camelot. Before the group departed Camelot, Gwen asked Lancelot to protect Arthur and, still in love with her, Lancelot promised to do so. When Merlin was injured protecting Arthur, he volunteered to take the wounded man back to Camelot while Arthur and the others continued with the quest. In the second part of the episode, Lancelot and Merlin eventually raced after Arthur and the others to reach them before they arrived at the Isle of the Blessed, where the veil could be restored. On the journey, Merlin confided in Lancelot about his plan to take Arthur's place as the sacrifice to restore the veil. When they arrived at the Isle, however, Lancelot willingly took Merlin's place, both to fulfil the promise he'd made to Gwen and also to keep Merlin alive, who was Arthur's chief and most effective protector. The knight was honoured with a memorial ceremony back in Camelot after Arthur and the others returned, and Guinevere wept for his loss.

Lancelot, however, was not permitted to rest in peace. In the fourth series episode "Lancelot du Lac", Morgana revived him for the purpose of preventing the approaching marriage between Arthur and Guinevere. He was, however, Lancelot in appearance only; he had little to no recollection of his life and vowed to serve Morgana. She subsequently instructed him in what she knew of his life and of his previous attraction to Gwen, then ordered him to seduce her. Morgana also gave him an enchanted bracelet to give to Gwen as a wedding present, as it would rekindle and magnify her previous feelings for Lancelot. Manipulated by Agravaine, Arthur eventually discovered Lancelot and Gwen in a passionate embrace. Gwen was subsequently banished from Camelot and Lancelot imprisoned. Morgana then sent Lancelot one final order via Agravaine – to kill himself, so that he would never reveal the plot to Arthur or anyone else.

After his death, Arthur ordered Merlin to take care of Lancelot's body. The warlock therefore placed his body on a floating pyre on the Lake of Avalon. Before setting the pyre off, however, Merlin used his magic to cleanse Lancelot's soul but in doing so managed to briefly resurrect him. The noble knight managed to speak the name of his friend and thank him before dying for the last time. Merlin then used his magic to send the boat out into the lake and set it alight finally giving Lancelot's soul peace.

=== Leon ===
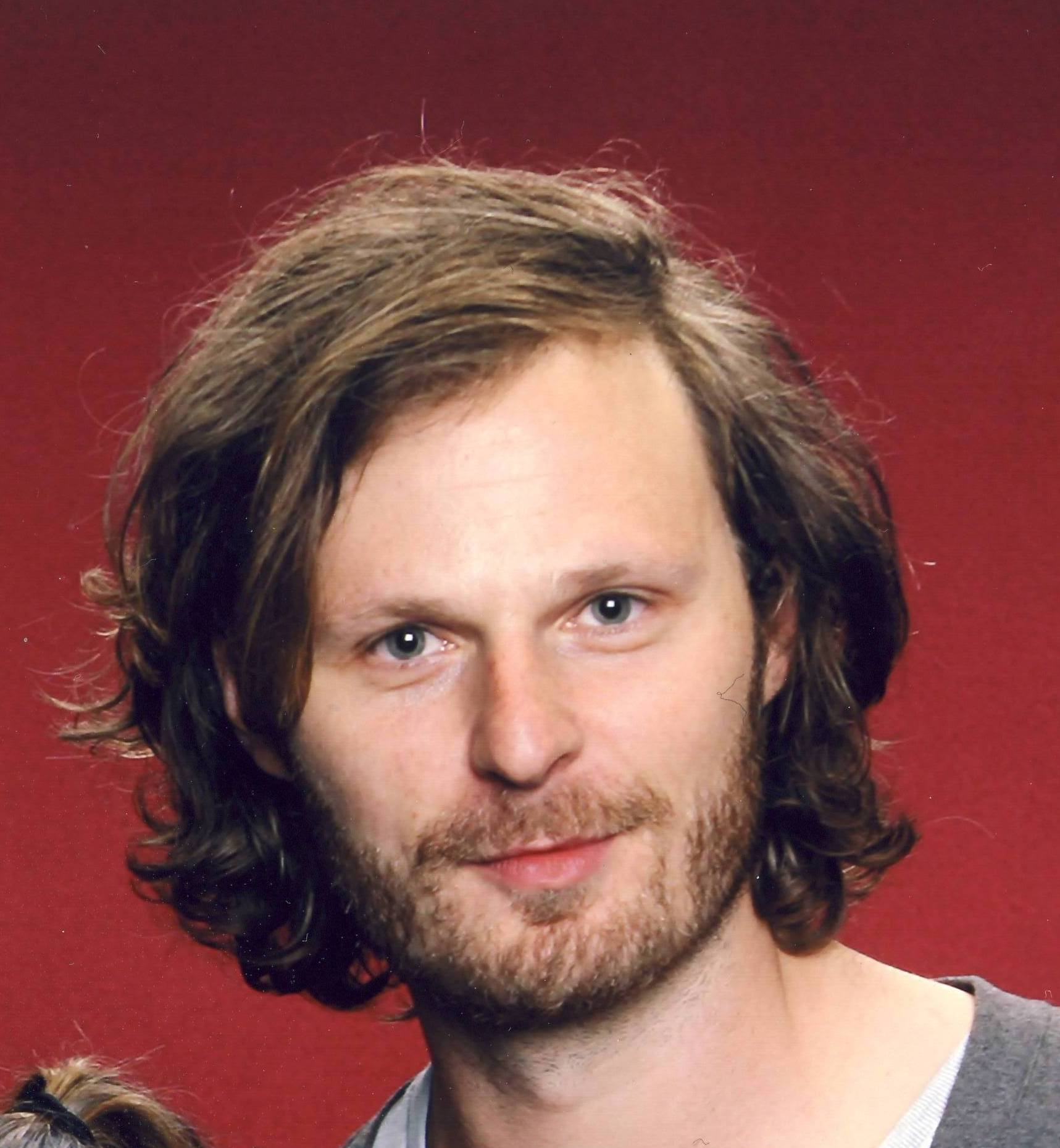
Rupert Young

Sir Leon (portrayed by Rupert Young) is a knight of Camelot and something close to Arthur's second in command. He is also the first of the "Knights of the Round Table" that is shown in the series. He first appears as a jousting partner for Arthur in "The Once and Future Queen" but pulls away when the Prince is blinded by light. This causes Arthur to want to prove himself as a person, not just because he is Prince. Leon is later unhorsed jousting against 'Sir William' in the semi-finals of the tournament.

In "The Last Dragonlord" he took control of Camelot's defence while Arthur was searching for Balinor. He is also the first knight to step forward at Arthur's request for a fighting force against the Dragon. During the battle he was either unhorsed by Kilgarrah's tail or caught in the flames, but nevertheless, he survived.

In "The Tears of Uther Pendragon (Part II), Sir Leon helps defend the castle against Cenred's army and engages in combat with one of the undead soldiers summoned by Morgana, but Merlin breaks the spell reanimating the undead soldier before Leon is killed.

In "The Coming of Arthur", he is the only survivor of Camelot's knights when they are massacred after King Cenred accused them of trespassing on his territory during a patrol. Leon is discovered by a party of druids, who find that he is close to death and revive him with water from the cup of life. On hearing Leon's story Uther realises that the legendary Cup of Life is in the druids' possession. Following Morgana's attempted coup of Camelot, Leon continues to defy her 'request' for him to recognise her authority until Gwen is able to help him escape, the two meeting Arthur in the cave he was using as his hiding-place. Leon subsequently joined Arthur's makeshift band of knights to launch a final attack on Camelot to rescue Uther, Merlin emptying the Cup of Life and defeating the immortal army while the knights rescued Uther. Leon subsequently returned to Camelot with his fellow 'Knights of the Round Table'. After Arthur's death by Mordred a grief-stricken Leon proclaimed Guinevere the new queen.

== M ==
=== Mary Collins ===
Mary Collins (portrayed by Eve Myles) was a sorceress and the antagonist of the episode "The Dragon's Call". After her son was executed for using magic, she threatened to kill Prince Arthur in revenge against the king. She killed Lady Helen, who was visiting Camelot to perform for Uther, and assumed Lady Helen's appearance. However, her true form could be revealed in any reflection. Her singing put the entire royal court into an enchanted sleep except Merlin, and he stopped her from killing Arthur by causing a chandelier to fall on her body. As everybody awoke, her true form was seen, and she threw a dagger at Arthur. Merlin saved him and Mary Collins died from her injuries.

=== Merlin ===
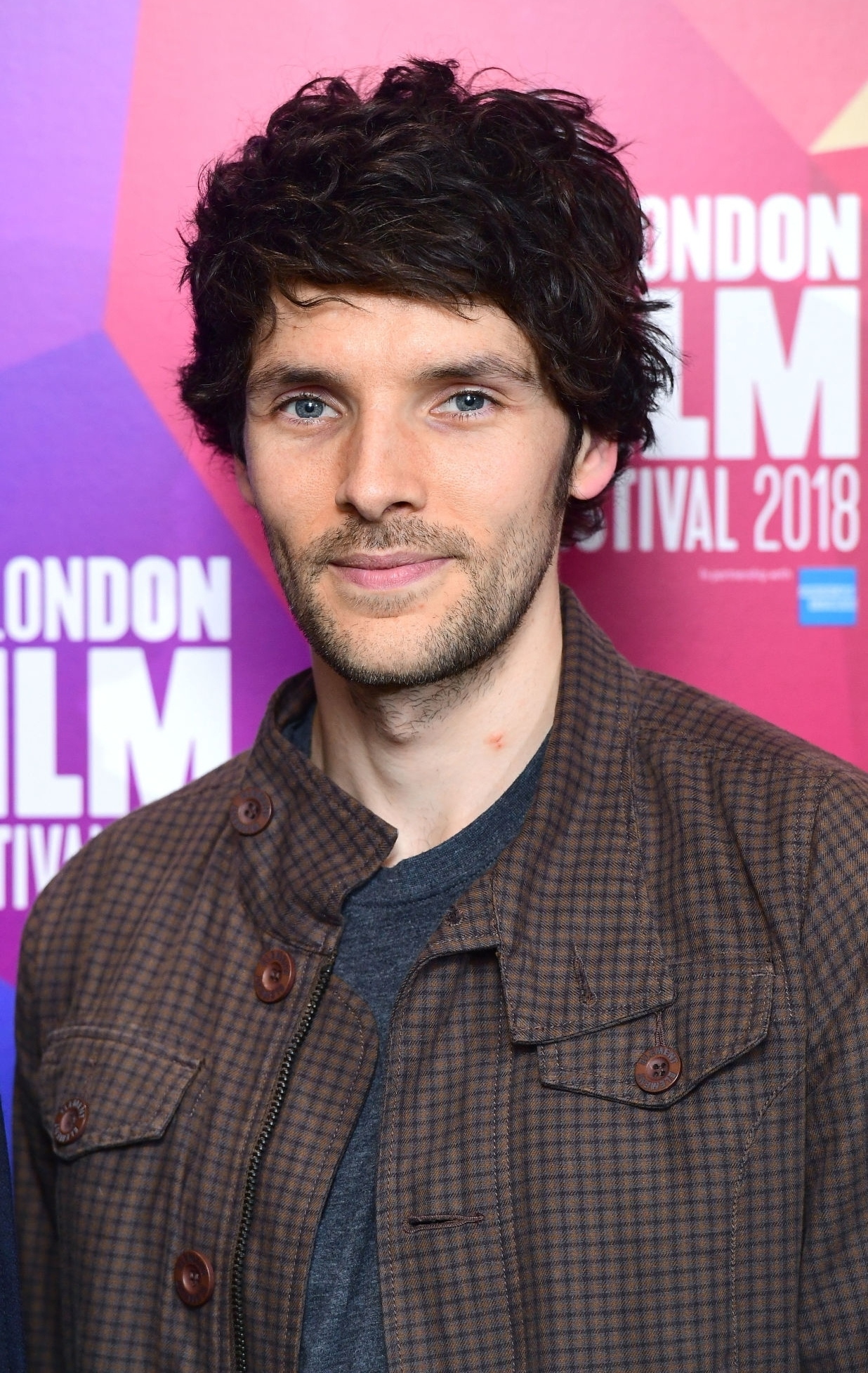
Colin Morgan

Merlin (portrayed by Colin Morgan) is the main character in the series. His destiny is to ensure Arthur becomes king in the hope his reign will see the return of magic. Merlin is sent to Camelot by his mother to live with her old friend, the court physician Gaius. In the first series, Merlin becomes Arthur's retainer when he saves his life, and learns of the Great Dragon, who informs him of his destiny and advises him when Merlin faces exceptional magic. The series focuses on his relationship with Arthur, which is comically portrayed with the prince always rudely teasing Merlin, who avoids suspicion of his powers by appearing dim-witted, which is aided by occasional genuine clumsiness. But Arthur comes to care for his servant, even putting his life at risk to rescue a poisoned Merlin. Merlin becomes friends with Lady Morgana, the King's Ward, and Guinevere, Gwen for short, her maid. Gwen is at first smitten by him, but their friendship soon becomes platonic. Merlin also befriends Lancelot, a peasant skilled in war. Merlin's adventures include saving Gwen from execution for witchcraft, saving Arthur from becoming a human sacrifice to the Sidhe, rescuing a druid boy named Mordred with Morgana's help, and forging the sword Excalibur. Towards the end of the series, Merlin plays a vital role as offers his own life in place for Arthur's to the sorceress Nimueh. But the spell cast begins to kill Merlin's mother, Hunith, instead. Gaius nobly decides to offer his life of her behalf. Merlin races to his side when learns this and kills Nimueh, inadvertently restoring the balance.

In the second series, as Merlin's friendship with Arthur deepens, he is forced to promise the Great Dragon, Kilgharrah freedom in exchange for its knowledge. When Merlin finds out Morgana also has magic, he fights the temptation to tell her of his powers. But his efforts to help her begin to turn her heart against Uther forever. The series climax sees Morgana turned into a vessel for a sleeping plague by Morgause, her half-sister, and Merlin poisons her reluctantly, blackmailing Morgause into ending her attack. The pair disappear almost at once, but more chaos is wrought when Merlin releases Kilgharrah, who immediately seeks revenge on Camelot. Merlin and Arthur locate the last Dragonlord, Balinor, who is in fact Merlin's father. Balinor is killed as they return home, but Merlin inherits his Dragonlord powers and tames Kilgharrah, forcing it to end its rampage.

The third series begins one year later, Morgana is finally found. However, Merlin quickly discovers she is now in league with Morgause to have Uther and Arthur killed, only returning to Camelot as a spy. He is left for dead by Morgause shortly afterwards, but is rescued by Kilgharrah and learns Morgana is now his nemesis. Merlin returns to Camelot, helping win a battle against an opposing army in league with Morgause. From then on, Merlin continually thwarts Morgana's schemes, even devising an alter-ego "Dragoon the Great" to save Guinevere from accusations of seducing Arthur with magic. However, Morgana becomes Queen of Camelot when Morgause creates an immortal army using the "Cup of Life" with her ally Cenred. Arthur stages an attack to retake the castle, while a returning Lancelot aids Merlin in breaking the enchantment with Excalibur, killing the immortal army. Morgause is badly injured at the hands of Merlin and Gaius, and Morgana violently lashes out, teleporting them away.

In the fourth series, when Morgana creates a rift to release souls of the dead on the kingdom, Merlin, attempts to sacrifice himself to end the spell, but Lancelot takes his place. The season also marks the first time Morgana learns of "Emrys", Merlin's alter-ego, who she identifies as "her destiny and doom". Throughout the season, Merlin distrusts Agravaine, Arthur's uncle, who is in league with Morgana. After Uther is mortally wounded, Merlin decides to use magic as Dragoon to save him and prove to Arthur that it is not a force of evil, but his plan backfires when Morgana interferes. Merlin's first encounter with Morgana has her put him under her thrall to kill Arthur. Gaius and Gwen help Merlin regain control, and he then goes to Morgana's hovel disguised as Dragoon to destroy the enchantment, defeating Morgana in a magical duel. In the final episodes, Morgana takes control of Camelot again with the help of warlord Helios and Agravaine. Arthur and Merlin go into hiding until Agravaine locates them. Merlin consequently kills the traitor with magic, and has Arthur lead the surviving knights and the people of Camelot against her. He temporarily robs Morgana of her powers, forcing her to flee. Merlin is last seen in the season, chanting "Long Live the Queen!" as Gwen and Arthur marry.

In the fifth series when Mordred becomes a Knight after rescuing Arthur from Morgana, Merlin remains suspicious of him, fearing a prophecy in which the Druid kills the king. Mordred is loyal to Camelot for some time, but eventually turns against them following the execution of his love Kara, who made an attempt on Arthur's life, and he informs Morgana that Merlin is 'Emrys'. In response, Morgana uses a creature to drain Merlin's magic. Merlin travels to the Crystal Cave to restore his power, but a traitor in Camelot reveals this to Morgana, and she seals Merlin inside. As the final battle begins, Merlin encounters the Ghost of his Father and with his guidance, regains his magic. He rides to Camlann, the site of the battle between Camelot and the Saxons, and under the disguise of Dragoon the Great uses magic never before seen to aid Camelot's victory. But he finds Arthur fatally wounded at Mordred's hand and reveals he was the Sorcerer, and that he has been helping Arthur for the past 6 years. He takes Arthur to Avalon to heal him, but the pair are attacked by Morgana a short distance away, but she is taken by surprise when Merlin kills her with Excalibur, but he does not feel any guilt, shame and remorse for killing his former friend, due to her monstrous acts, although Merlin does partly blame himself for the monster that Morgana had become. Merlin calls the Great Dragon, Kilgharrah to carry him and Arthur to Avalon, but the delay caused by Morgana sees Arthur die. Merlin sends Arthur to Avalon after Kilgharrah states that Arthur will rise again, when Albion's need is greatest. In the present day, Merlin is shown to be still alive and waiting for Arthur to rise.

=== Mithian ===
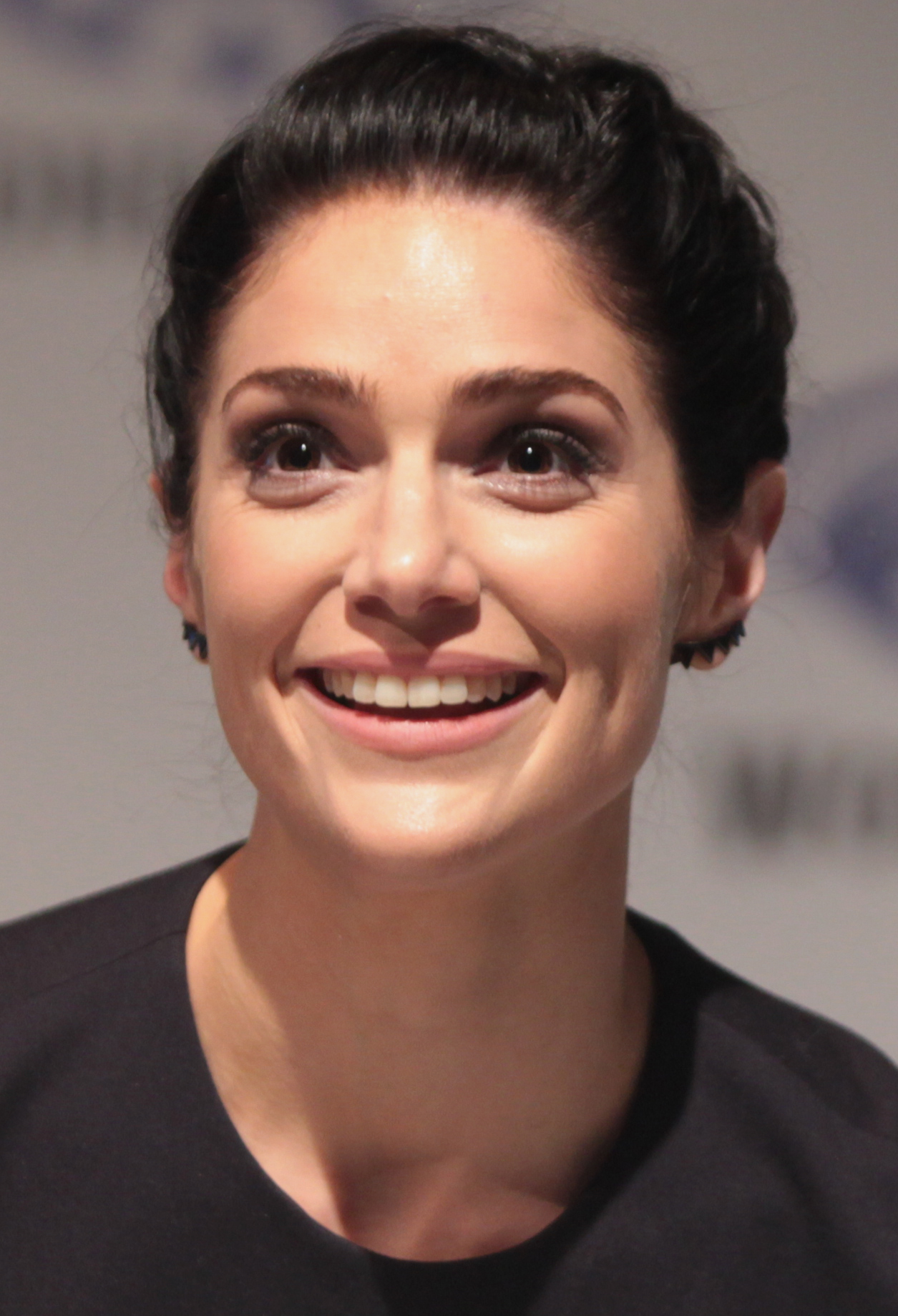
Janet Montgomery

Mithian (portrayed by Janet Montgomery) is the beautiful Princess of Nemeth, a neighbouring kingdom of Camelot. In the fourth series episode "The Hunter's Heart", Mithian travelled to Camelot to marry Arthur as part of a treaty between the two kingdoms over a land dispute regarding The Lands of Gefref. Her great beauty and good humour attracted Arthur and the two seemed to get along well, taking a morning picnic together and even sharing in a love of hunting. However, when Arthur found the engagement ring he had given to Guinevere, he found that he could not let go of his love for her and called off his wedding to Mithian. Though upset by his rejection, Mithian accepted Arthur's compromise of Camelot giving up their claims over the disputed lands between their two kingdoms. When Arthur told her his continued love for Guinevere, Mithian wistfully said that she would give up her kingdom "to be so loved".

Mithian returned to Camelot over three years later, in the fifth series episode Another's Sorrow, after an attack on Nemeth led by King Odin and Morgana. Blackmailed into lying to Arthur by threats to her father's life, Mithian was forced to lead Arthur and his knights into a trap set by Odin. Throughout the journey, however, Mithian did not cease her attempts to warn someone of the danger ahead, despite the constant presence of a disguised Morgana at her side and the pain the witch inflicted on her with an enchanted bracelet. She was also grief-stricken after Morgana attacked and nearly killed Merlin who had discovered Morgana's identity. After the battle, Mithian apologised to Arthur for the deception, though he assured her that he would likely have done the same if he had been in her position and she returned to Nemeth with her father.

=== Mordred ===
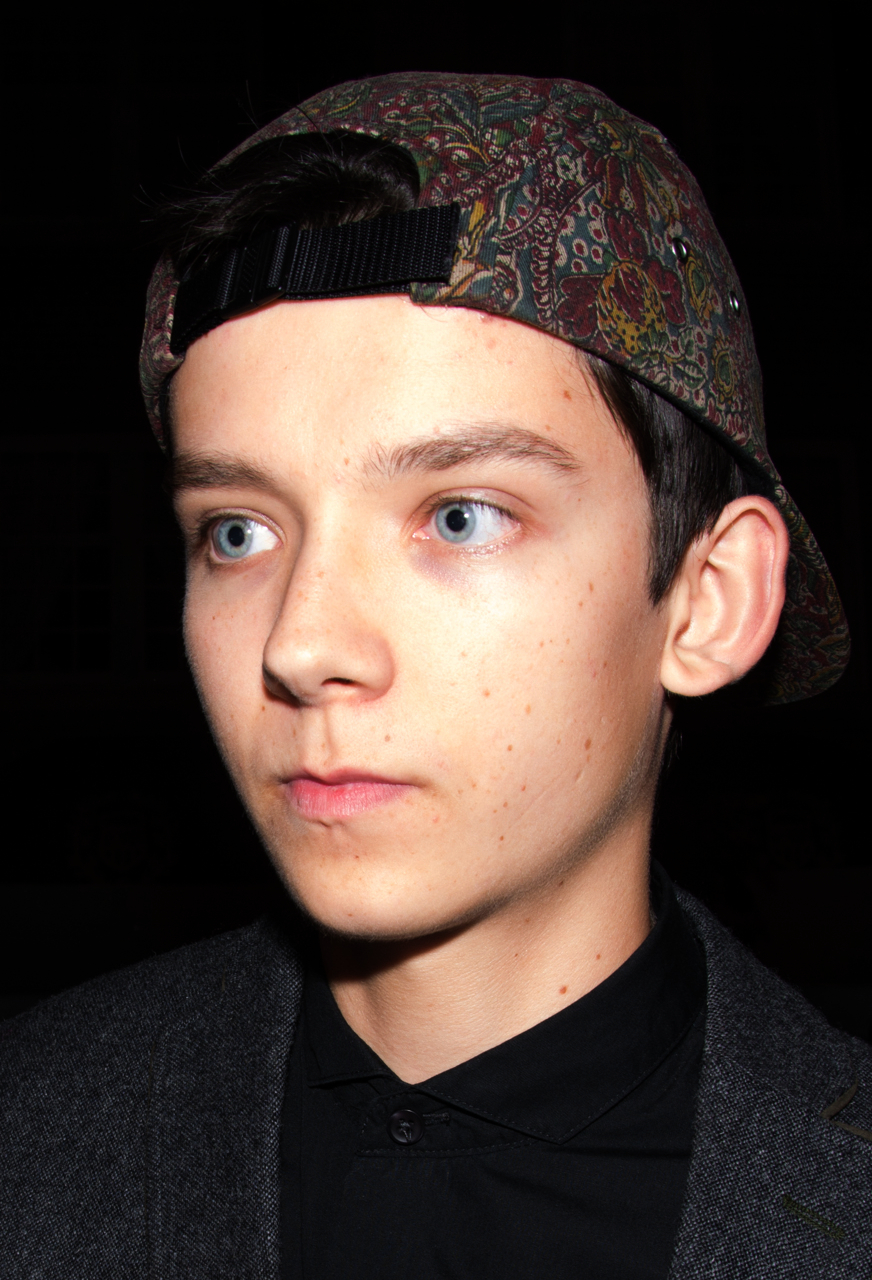
Asa Butterfield

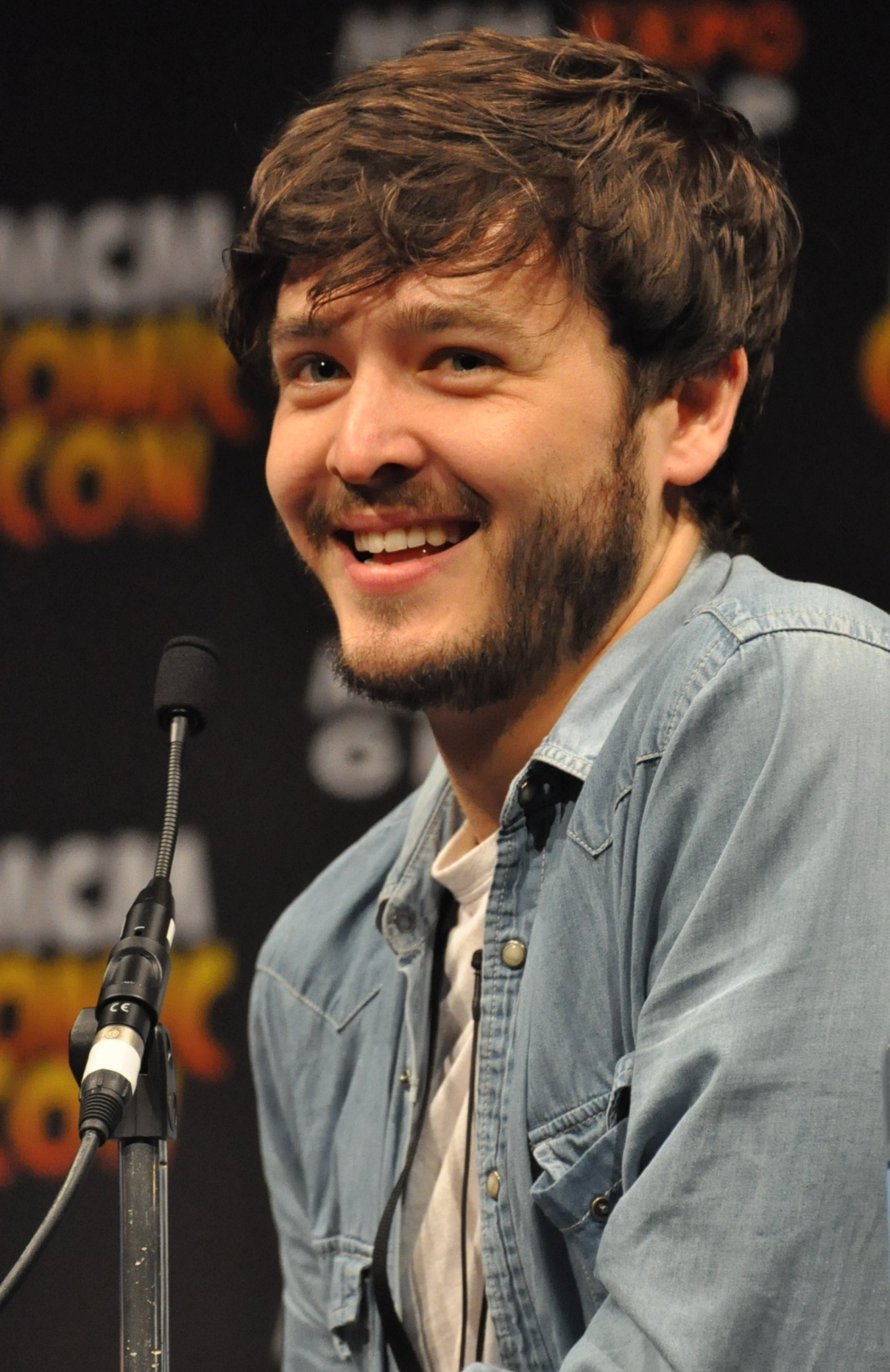
Alexander Vlahos

Mordred (portrayed by Asa Butterfield and Alexander Vlahos) was a Druid, whose master Cerdan is executed on Uther's orders. Morgana claims to feel an inexplicable link with the boy which drives her to keep him safe. The Great Dragon later tells Merlin that Mordred will one day kill Arthur. Mordred is telepathic and calls Merlin "Emrys" [the Welsh form of Ambrose or Ambrosius, meaning "Immortal"], claiming he knows who Merlin is and that they are "the same". Despite the warning, Merlin eventually helps Morgana in a plan for Arthur to escape with the boy. He returns again in episode 2.3 when Morgana goes in search of the Druids. By way of her telepathic connection, he is able to sense that she has been stung by a giant scorpion and needs help. It is also shown that Mordred's magic is powerful enough to kill four or five armed soldiers with a single spell. He returns in "The Witch's Quickening" when he, allied with a group of renegades, seeks an ancient crystal with the ability to show the future, but he is forced to flee when the bandits are discovered. As he escapes, Merlin attempts to stop him by causing a branch to trip him up, but Mordred retaliates by impaling two knights in the back with spears, grimly informing Merlin that he will not forgive nor forget this. Mordred's trademarks are his icy blue glare and green cloak. It is presumed he was about 11 in "The Beginning of the End", and about 12 in both "The Nightmare Begins" and The "Witch's Quickening".

After Mordred's appearance in "The Witch's Quickening," he disappears and he is not seen again until series 5, seven years later. Merlin, Arthur, and a patrol of knights are heading to Ismere, where Morgana has been capturing patrols of knights to help her find the Diamair – a key to all knowledge which will help her learn of 'Arthur's Bane'. Merlin and the others find a village which was slaughtered on the outskirts of Queen Annis's kingdom. Merlin hears someone calling him Emrys and he enters a dark cave to meet a dying Druid man. The man tells Merlin of Arthur's bane which he says "stalks him like a ghost", before showing him a vision. Merlin sees a young man (who at the moment does not recognise) kill Arthur. At the end of the episode, a group of Saxons attempt to kill Arthur and Merlin, but are stopped by the young man from the vision, who Merlin recognises as Mordred.

The second episode brings Mordred to the center stage as he journeys with the Saxons and the two prisoners—Arthur and Merlin—to the fortress in Ismere where Morgana is. Mordred is now presumed to be about eighteen. He helps the pair escape the Saxons, but as Mordred follows them, Merlin uses magic to make the passage over a cliff impossible. Arthur chooses to spare Mordred's life, much to Merlin's anger. Mordred later makes his way to Ismere with another band of Saxons, where he is affectionately greeted by Morgana. They dine together, though Morgana quickly grows angry when she learns Arthur has escaped capture. However, the fortress is soon alerted to the presence of an intruder, and the pair confront the unarmed king in the fortress. Morgana incapacitates Merlin as she moves to kill Arthur, but is stabbed in the back by Mordred. Mordred assists in the escape, and is knighted for his bravery. He reveals that he values Arthur's compassion and loyalty to his kingdom above Morgana's desire to see the return of magic.

The fifth episode of season 5 entitled "The Disir", sees Arthur, Merlin, and Mordred confront a sorcerer who has been injured by Gwaine. The dying sorcerer gives Arthur a coin from the Disir, interpreted as a judgement against Arthur. Mordred is allowed to accompany the King to meet the Disir, and is consequently fatally injured protecting his King. Arthur decides to beg for Mordred's life, and the Disir give him an ultimatum, saying that he must embrace the Old Ways. Arthur is swayed against them by Merlin, in an attempt to prevent Mordred's survival. Arthur is therefore told his fate and doom is now sealed. Once they arrive in Camelot, Mordred exits the castle alive and well, and Merlin realises his mistake – that Arthur refusing to embrace the Old Religion sealed his fate.

Mordred finally turns against Camelot when the girl he loves is executed for trying to kill Arthur. He tells Morgana Merlin is Emrys. Mordred's Sword is then forged in the breath of the White Dragon Aithusa. Merlin is deprived of his magic and sealed in the Crystal Cave. Morgana's Saxon Army prepares to attack the forces of Camelot at Camlann, Mordred is sent to lead part of the army through a secret pass to attack Camelot's forces. However Merlin regains his magic and warns Arthur. In the battle Mordred succeeds in wounding Arthur, however Arthur then stabs him dead. A shard of Mordred's Sword remains lodged in Arthur, killing him soon after. Mordred is buried by Morgana who swears revenge, but after tracking Arthur and Merlin down is killed by Excalibur.

=== Morgana Pendragon ===
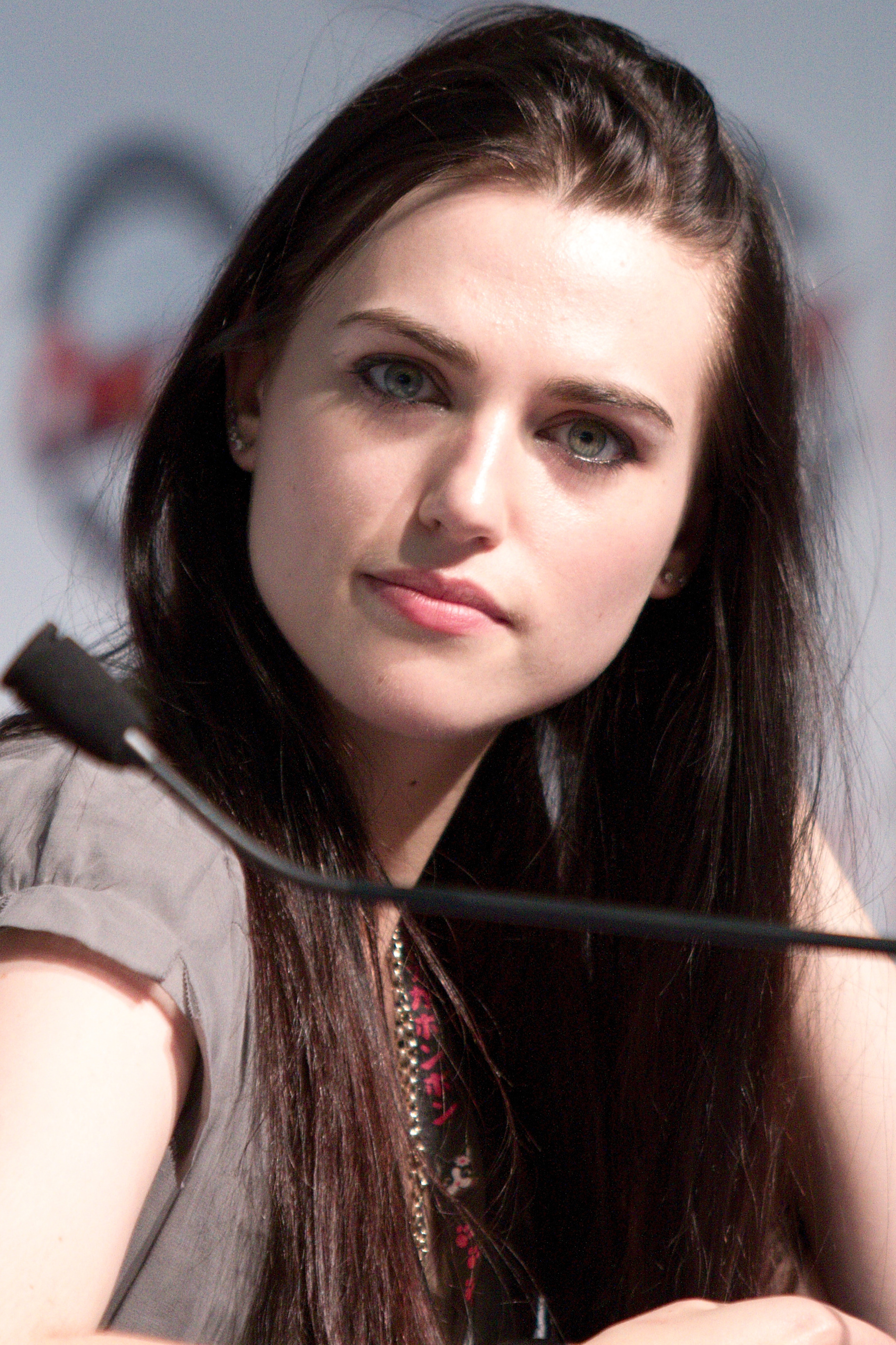
Katie McGrath

Morgana Pendragon (portrayed by Katie McGrath) is the heretofore unknown daughter of Uther Pendragon and Vivianne, the wife of his close friend and leading military commander, Gorlois; she is the half-sister of Arthur Pendragon and Morgause.

Morgana is portrayed as a sympathetic, passionate and kind-hearted individual during Merlin's early time in Camelot, with great personal heroism as well as showing a willingness to confront the attitudes of others; she speaks up for Gwen, Merlin, Mordred and others who face Uther's temper or would suffer from his willingness to "abandon them to their fate" during certain conflicts, as well as being a persuasive force with Arthur.

But overtime, sadly, Morgana's growing fear that she has magic, as well as her increasing anger towards Uther's callousness, a distance from Arthur, possibly due to his growing close to her maid, the hostility of the Great Dragon, Kilgharrah toward her, that she is unaware of and most importantly, the unwillingness of Merlin and Gaius to tell her the truth or give her any real help in understanding or controlling what is happening to her, all of which serves to leave her feeling increasingly isolated and alone, which enables Morgause, and others to corrupt and use her, eventually following a long period of isolation with Morgause, indicated to be about a year sees her previous compassionate views warped and Morgana become fully committed to evil.

In the first season and much of the second, Morgana was portrayed as a kind and loyal friend. She was raised by Uther as his ward, her father having died when she was about ten, her mother's fate is ambiguous, in fact, she has hardly any mentions in the series. Gaius tells Merlin that she suffers from nightmares, and the young warlock often brought her the physician's latest sleeping draught. Morgana's trust in Merlin and Arthur was such that she was a driving force in helping Merlin and Arthur stop a plague from spreading in the kingdom, and she also helped Merlin save his village from bandits, in defiance of Uther's orders not to get involved.

But Morgana did not understand Uther's hatred for magic, and did not favour his reaction of killing those with magic. Although she had flirted with a plan to try and to kill Uther, in anger for his execution of her maid and friend, Gwen's father, the blacksmith Tom, implicated in a plot of a group of rogue sorcerers, who want Uther dead, she later abandoned them when Uther indicated to her that he was "wrong" in his decision regarding Tom, though this seems to be more about Morgana and the late Gorlois, than his attitude regarding anything related to magic cases, and she then killed Tauren, who led the attempt on the king.

Morgana's dreams, which she had said to have had since she was very young are, in fact, visions, her nightmares presaged several events, that Merlin and Gaius were able to use in order to prevent the things seen by Morgana, like Arthur's death from coming to pass.

In the episode "Gates of Avalon", Gaius talks to Morgana about her being a seer, but this is never addressed by them again.

In season 2, Morgana's prophetic nightmares continue and other strange events happen around her, that she cannot explain and greatly fears. Though Gaius realises that the sleeping potions, in reality, they were also attempts to keep her burgeoning powers latent, are no longer working, but he stubbornly refuses to acknowledge what's happening to Morgana, and patently ignores Merlin's pleas to try and help her. While Merlin sincerely wants to help her, the warnings of his guardian and Kilgarrah hamstring his intentions, and his fears eventually impact on their relationship; but he advised her to visit the Druids and she does, where one confirms her worst fear, she has magic.

Morgana trusts Merlin to keep her secret safe, which he does, but later on, all three resident magic-users are scared to the bone when Uther hires Aredian, the most feared Witchfinder to detect any and all sorcerers in Camelot, when someone reports that they witnessed magic, performed by Merlin. The Witchfinder correctly suspects Merlin, Gaius and Morgana, his methods are unscrupulous, and in private conversation, it's intimated his techniques were more about power over people, specifically indicated in how he gets Gaius to "confess"; he told Gaius that he knows Morgana also has magic of some sort, but never voices this discovery to Uther. One has to wonder how he was able to determine this. Merlin later saves Gaius and himself from Aredian's charges, by making the Witchfinder appear a fraud; he dies attempting to escape an accusation of sorcery himself and having taken Morgana hostage, he immediately loses Uther's favour and trust.

Later in the season, the mysterious Morgause arrives in Camelot, her arrival is feared by both Uther and Gaius. She wished to duel with Arthur, and was apparently willing to kill him. But her plan was more complex, for she spares him, but requires him to travel to her domain and face another challenge, at a later date, which he accepts, despite Uther's adamant refusal; she also implies she knew his mother, the late Ygraine, which only serves to make Arthur more willing to seek her out again.

Morgana, not realizing that Morgause is her maternal half-sister, feels she has met her before and somehow knows her. Gaius and Uther speak about Morgause in very confusing and cryptic terms, but what is clear is that she and Morgana are related, and both men fear knowledge and information she may possess. Morgana, later receives from Morgause what she says is a healing bracelet which appears to give her the relief from her nightmares, which she does not really have, until now, to Gaius' surprise and concern.

Merlin thwarts Morgause's plan for Arthur to eventually kill Uther, having opened a brief gateway, in order to call Ygraine to her son and reveal Uther's part in his mother's death, and most importantly; the fact that Arthur was born with the aid of magic, Arthur, enraged at decades of destruction and hatred due to Uther and his lies, now desires to kill Uther in vengeance for his mother, just as Morgause expected. But Merlin lies to Arthur and says the shade has to have just been an illusion created by Morgause, purely for the sake of creating discord between father and son, despite the fact that he knows, from both Gaius and the late Nimueh that what Ygraine's spirit is saying, in fact, true. He willingly does this to protect Arthur from living with the burden of killing his own father, although he still struggles with the truth and is angered by having to cover up for Uther, and feels uncomfortable with Arthur thanking him for "revealing" Morgause's plot, he is also threatened with death by Uther to never speak to anyone of Arthur's actions.

Later, when a frustrated and frightened Morgana reveals to Morgause how much she hates Uther and wants to kill him, Morgause uses her sister to cause the whole kingdom to fall asleep under a spell of which Morgana is the vessel to maintain it. Merlin realizes Morgana is the source of the enchantment, and therefore is forced to poison her to leverage Morgause. He bargains with Morgause to stop her attack on Camelot in order to keep Morgana alive. But Morgause takes Morgana away from Camelot; she heals her and succeeds in turning her completely against Camelot.

In the third season, Morgana returns, this time fully committed to kill Uther and Arthur. She causes Uther to lose his mind and when Merlin discovers her and Morgause's alliance they attempt to kill him. When Merlin survives Morgana forces his silence about their plans by threatening to tell Uther that he poisoned the king's beloved ward. Morgana and Morgause along with Cendred ally against Camelot, but Uther and Camelot still do not suspect Morgana.

Morgana's birthday arrives, and Arthur gifts her a dagger. Having foreseen Morgana use the dagger to kill Uther, Merlin begins to keep tabs on Morgana's actions. On the night of her birthday, Morgana leaves the citadel to meet Morgause to simply celebrate her birthday with her sister, but Merlin assumes Morgana is set to kill Uther, leading to him accidentally throwing Morgana down a flight of stairs. A dying Morgana is taken to Gaius' chambers where he reveals to a devastated Uther that Morgana has fractured her cranium, and she may die soon. Uther suggests using magic to save Morgana, claiming he will go to any lengths to save her. Uther reveals to Gaius in secret that Morgana is in fact Uther's daughter; when Gorlois was away in battle, his wife, Vivienne grew lonely which had led to an affair between her and Uther, the product being Morgana. Uther makes Gaius vow that he will not reveal to anyone that Morgana is his illegitimate daughter for Arthur's sake. But their conversation is overheard by a sleeping Morgana. Morgana makes a full recovery and furiously reveals to Morgause that Uther is her father; well Morgana is repulsed, Morgause is pleased as it means that Morgana has a legitimate claim to Camelot's throne. But Morgana is still fuelled with rage over Uther prioritising Arthur's claim to the throne over Morgana's, leading to her attempting to kill her father, but she is stopped by Merlin. From this point, Morgana makes it her mission to kill Arthur to make her the sole heir to Uther's throne. With the aid of Morgause, Morgana uses her magic within the castle walls on several occasions to kill her brother, but she constantly fails. Morgana is then troubled with nightmares of Gwen taking the throne, and she attempts to have Gwen killed by framing her for enchanting Arthur. But Merlin's involvement saves Gwen from Uther's wrath, leaving Morgana furious.

Morgana and Morgause unleash their final plan and overthrow Uther, making Morgana queen. Uther, Arthur and the others are shocked at Morgana's betrayal. Morgana begins a reign of darkness over Camelot, having citizens killed in the courtyard when they refuse to declare their allegiance to their new queen. Morgause's immortal army, created using the Cup of Life, support Morgana's tyrannical reign. During her time as queen, Morgana imprisons and emotionally tortures Uther, claiming that it is his actions which had twisted her soul. Arthur, Merlin, Gaius, Gwen and the knights manage to overthrow Morgana and Morgause when Merlin empties the Cup. But in the battle over the Cup Merlin fatally wounds Morgause in the throne room. Morgana, devastated at her army's destruction, her defeated reign and her sister's injuries declares that her crusade against Camelot has just begun before using her magic to escape.

A year has passed since Morgana fell from power and lost her crown. She is now self-exiled from Camelot and is in hiding with a crippled Morgause. Morgana's powers have grown and she is now a high priestess; using her dark magic, she sacrifices Morgause as a part of her plan to get her revenge on Camelot by using her sister's death to unleash the Dorocha on Camelot. Upon unleashing the Dorocha, Morgana is warned by the Gatekeeper of the Spirit World that Emrys will be her doom. Morgana's betrayal has left Uther a broken man and Arthur acts as king, with support from his uncle, Agravaine. But Agravaine's true loyalties are revealed to Morgana when he visits her hideout to inform her of Camelot's growing weakness from the Dorocha attacks. But the Dorocha are defeated when Sir Lancelot sacrifices himself; this sends Morgana into a rage who believes that Emrys thwarted her plans. She instructs Agravaine to help her find and destroy Emrys.

When Uther is mortally wounded in an assassination attempt on Arthur, Agravaine passes on the "good news" to Morgana. When she realizes that Arthur plans to use a sorcerer to save Uther, Morgana uses her magic to enchant Uther's necklace to cause her father's demise. Uther finally dies and Arthur takes the throne. When Agravaine visits Morgana to inform her of her success in Uther's demise, she is evidently disturbed, but not saddened, by her father's death and claims that there will be no celebrations, until she takes the throne of Camelot.

When queen Annis declares war on Camelot after Arthur kills her husband, king Caerleon in cold blood, Morgana preys on Annis' grief and forms an alliance with Annis against Arthur and Camelot. To prevent an all out war, Arthur chooses to face one of Annis' warriors in single combat; if Arthur wins, Annis will leave Camelot in peace, but if Arthur loses, Camelot will fall. Agravaine smuggles Arthur's sword to Morgana who uses her magic to enchant the sword to bear the weight of a thousand ages. During the battle, Morgana activates the enchantment, and it momentarily seems that Arthur may lose as Annis's and Arthur's armies watch on in shock, but Arthur miraculously wins. It is Arthur's victory that sees Annis end her alliance with Morgana, who is accused of being more like Uther than she would like to think herself not to be.

When a badly wounded Merlin falls into her hands, Morgana uses him to attempt to assassinate Arthur. In order to release himself from her power, Merlin confronts Morgana as an 80-year-old man and she immediately recognises the feared Emrys. Initially terrified, Morgana gathers her courage and attempts to kill Emrys. After their battle she is left unconscious.

Morgana's fear of Emrys grows. Agravaine tells Morgana that Gaius knows who Emrys is. She hires Alator of the Catha and orders him to kidnap Gaius who is forced to tell Alator that Merlin is Emrys. Alator realizes from Gaius' words that Merlin is destined to unite the lands of Albion and bring peace to all those with magic and that Morgana is only destined to bring about darkness and tyranny to the land. It is Alator's hope for a better future that leads to him not telling Morgana of Emrys' identity. Alator uses his magic to attack Morgana when she questions Alator on who Emrys is. When she wakes she finds he has returned the valuable payment she gave him, the bracelet from her sister.

When Arthur proposes to Gwen, Morgana destroys their relationship by using Lancelot's shade and Gwen is banished.

For sometime, Morgana keeps her influence over Camelot low and spends her time secretly joining forces with Helios, a ruthless warlord to take over Camelot. Helios abducts an exiled Gwen, and unbeknownst of her connections with Arthur and Camelot, keeps her as his own. When Agravaine succeeds in passing plans of Camelot's siege tunnels to Morgana, Morgana visits Helios' camp and passes the plans to her ally in preparation for their invasion of Camelot. But Gwen who is being kept in the camp overhears Morgana and Helios' plans and flees the camp before she is killed. Morgana finds an old dress of Gwen's in the camp and realizes that Gwen has overheard her plans to invade Camelot. Morgana and Helios had lead a terrifying manhunt in pursuit of Gwen before she can warn Arthur of Morgana's impending attack. Morgana finally corners Gwen and uses her magic to transform Gwen into a deer, as Arthur is hunting in the woods and will kill Gwen unknowingly on sight. Once Helios' army of Southrons is finally up to strength, him and Morgana attack Camelot as Agravaine opens the siege tunnels to allow Morgana's army to pour right into the citadel.

Camelot soon falls to Morgana as the sorceress takes the throne once more, forcing Arthur and Merlin to flee her clutches. Morgana has Gaius and Gwaine imprisoned, and leads a manhunt in pursuit of a fleeing Arthur, but he manages to evade her. Morgana returns to Camelot where she tortures Elyan for information regarding Arthur's whereabouts; Elyan breaks under torture and tells Morgana that Arthur flees to Ealdor. Morgana orders Agravaine to lead her men to Ealdor whilst she enjoys her time on the throne, burning down the people's crops when they refuse to declare their allegiance to the dark queen. When Morgana finds out Agravaine and her army were wiped out by a dragon before they could get to Arthur, she claims it is the work of Emrys. Morgana is terrified when she finds Emrys stalking the castle corridors and orders security to increase as she sleeps in her chambers.

The following morning, Arthur and his knights lead a rebellion to win back Camelot from Morgana. Morgana finally comes face-to-face with Arthur in the throne room, where the two exchange words of bitterness. Morgana prepares to use her magic to kill Arthur once-and-for all, but she soon realizes that her powers are gone, unbeknownst to her, Merlin sneaked into the castle and placed an enchanted doll under Morgana's bed to drain her off her magic well she slept. In the ensuing battle, Helios attempts to protect Morgana as she attempts to make her escape, killing many Knights of Camelot in the process, but was still fatally wounded by one of Arthur's knights, despite her exceptional skills as a swordswoman.

Morgana faces Gwen once more, as the two battle. Just as Morgana is about to kill Gwen, but Merlin uses his magic to cause the ceiling to collapse, blasting Morgana unconscious. Arhur's ally, Isolde manages to kill Helios, but she fatally wound in the process and the Southrons are defeated as he wins back Camelot. As life returns to normal in the citadel, Arthur finally marries Gwen and crowns her Queen of Camelot. Morgana, it transpires, has been mortally wounded in the battle and escapes the castle. She stumbles through a forest and falls unconscious. Seemingly at her end, but Morgana greets death, the dragon Aithusa arrives and breaths back life, into Morgana. Morgana watches on in awe as Aithusa flies away.

Sometime later well Camelot flourishes in peace, Morgana and Aithusa are imprisoned by the Sarrum, a warlord, who is dedicated to wiping out magic. After two years in captivity, Morgana begins to lose her mind and she becomes mentally unstable as does a crippled Aithusa. Somehow, the two manage to escape and the now mentally unstable Morgana is now more than ever dedicated to destroy the Pendragons and Camelot. Now the most powerful dark sorceress in Albion, Morgana joins forces with the powerful druid, named Ruadan as they search for the key to Arthur's bane in the fortress of Ismere. Morgana has also abducted many of Arthur's knights and is using them as slaves to help her in her plans. Saxons, Morgana's men are in charge of bringing the sorceress slaves; when they return to Ismere to pass Morgana slaves, she is shocked to see Mordred with the Saxons. Morgana and Mordred reunite; during a dinner, Morgana flies into a rage when Mordred reveals they had Arthur in their grasp. When Arthur and Merlin infiltrate the fortress in hopes of freeing their men, Morgana attacks them and almost kills Arthur. But she is then betrayed by Mordred who strikes her down with a sword as he realizes that Morgana has turned evil beyond redemption and finds peace in Arthur's goodness.

But Morgana does not accept defeat so easily. Strengthening her crusade against Camelot, she allies herself with King Odin to take over the kingdom of Nemeth, Camelot's ally. Odin abducts Nemeth's king Rodor and Morgana uses princess Mithian to infiltrate Camelot. At Morgana's orders, Mithian unwillingly lures Arthur on a mission to rescue her imprisoned father, but Morgana is thwarted once more when Arthur manages to rescue Rodor and Odin forms an alliance with Arthur.

Morgana abducts Guinevere and imprisons her in the Dark Tower, where the evil sorceress begins to emotionally torture the queen against her friends. Morgana succeeds in turning Gwen against Camelot, and Gwen returns to the castle where she makes numerous attempts on Arthur's life under Morgana's orders. Soon, Morgana learns that Emrys means to free Gwen from her magical control and she attempts to stop Arthur and Merlin from cleansing Gwen's spirit of Morgana's evil. She attacks Mordred and Merlin with her magic; Merlin manages to escape to Arthur and Gwen well Morgana attempts to persuade Mordred to join her cause, reminding Mordred of how Arthur would react if he found out Mordred was a sorcerer. But Mordred merely proclaims that Arthur will one day come to accept magic and attempts to destroy Morgana by reminding her of her once loving nature before blasting Morgana unconscious.

Once Gwen is returned to her normal-self, Morgana makes it her mission to hunt down Emrys. She begins to build her Saxon army and uses her men to help her hunt down Alator of the Catha, who knows Emrys' true identity. But it becomes clear to Morgana that Alator will not break under her torture and she kills the high priest. Morgana then leads a terrifying manhunt in pursuit of the druid, Finna, Alator's friend, who also knows of Emrys's true identity. But Finna kills herself to avoid breaking under Morgana's torture, once again thwarting Morgana's plans to find out, who Emrys truly is.

It is Morgana's fury of constantly being thwarted, by Emrys that fuels her to declare war on Camelot. As an act of war, Morgana orders her Saxons to attack a supply wagon leading to Camelot, amongst the captured Saxons is Kara, Mordred's childhood lover. Arthur is forced to execute Kara as an enemy of Camelot, it is this action which drives Mordred against Camelot and fuels him to join Morgana. Mordred allies himself with Morgana by revealing to her the true identity of Emrys, that he is Merlin. Therefore, the Great Dragon, Kilgharrah's prophecy of Mordred and Morgana "uniting in evil" finally comes to pass.

With the knowledge that Merlin is Emrys, Morgana uses a powerful creature of the Old Religion to drain Merlin's power, rendering her nemesis from his magic. With her greatest threat left powerless, Morgana and Mordred begin their invasion of Camelot by attacking a nearby garrison. Arthur sees this as an act of war and is forced to prevent Morgana from reaching anywhere near Camelot by choosing to meet her forces at Camlann, the battlefield where Arthur is destined to die. Morgana soon learns that Merlin is attempting to get back his powers at the Crystal Cave, she travels to the cave where she uses her magic to trap Merlin in the cave for eternity. With Merlin now imprisoned, Morgana's forces come face-to-face with Arthur's army at Camlann and the battle begins.

With the combined powers of Morgana, Mordred, the Saxons and Aithusa, it seems they will defeat Arthur once-and-for all before Merlin arrives and uses his magic to destroy Morgana's army and render Morgana unconscious, allowing Arthur to emerge victorious. But Mordred soon comes face-to-face with Arthur and attempts to kill him, but Arthur manages to kill Mordred. Morgana is enraged by Mordred's death and vows to get revenge. Now, more crazed than ever to kill Arthur, Morgana travels to the Lake of Avalon after learning that Merlin is attempting to save Arthur there. She tracks down Merlin and Arthur, and uses her magic to defeat Merlin. Taunting Arthur of his impending death, Morgana is oblivious to Merlin, armed with Excallibur, sneaking up behind her. Morgana claims that she is immortal, due to her status as a high priestess, but her arrogance allows Merlin to stab her, the old religion offering no defence against the enchanted sword. The sorceress finally dies alone, returning peace to Camelot and Albion for good, although Arthur perishes minutes later.

=== Morgause ===
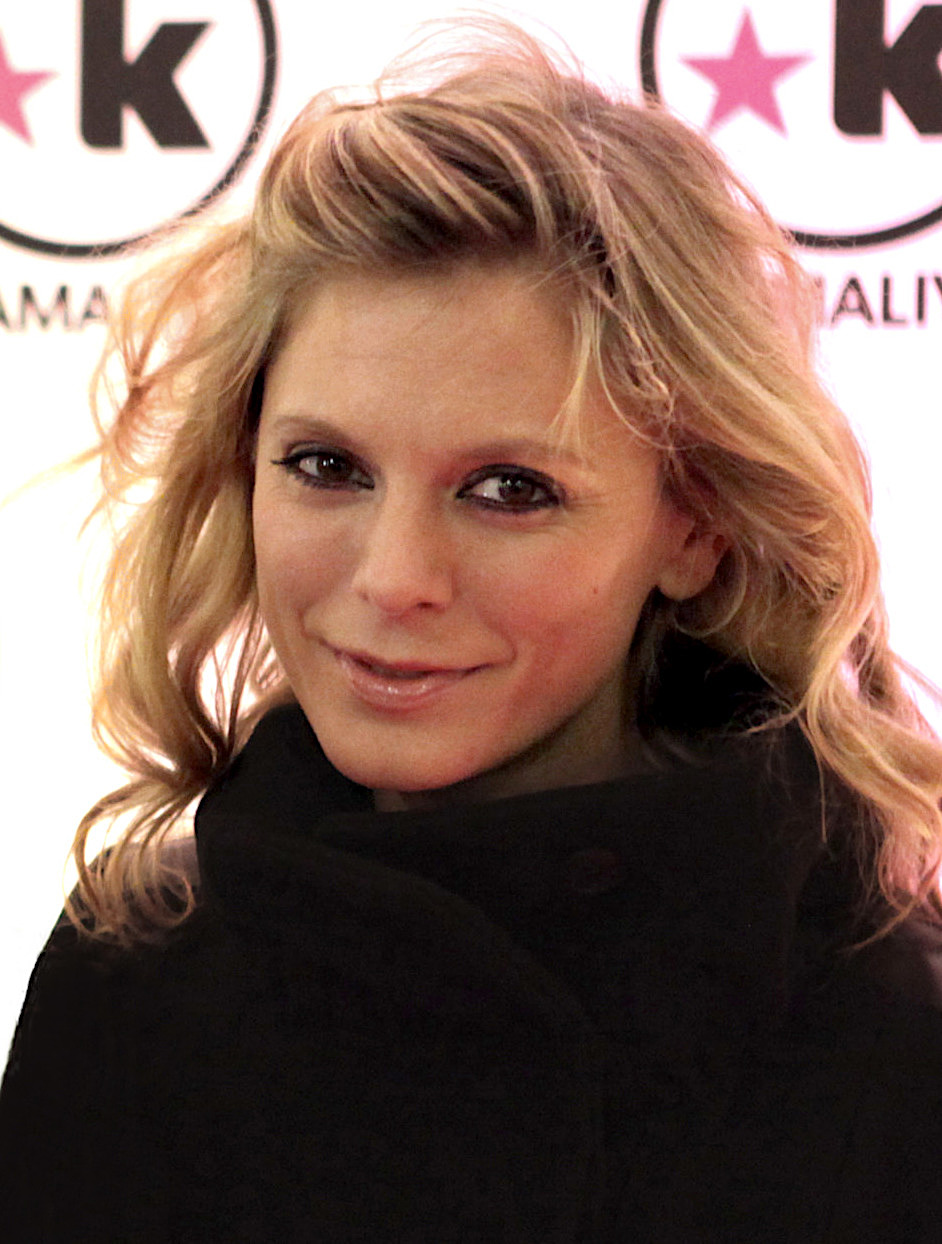
Emilia Fox

Morgause (portrayed by Emilia Fox) was a skilled warrior, sorceress, and the half-sister of Morgana Pendragon.

Morgause's exact parentage is uncertain. Gaius referred to her as Morgana's half-sister before he knew that Morgana was, in fact, the daughter of Uther, and not Gorlois. It has never been revealed which parent the two women shared, but it is believed that they had the same mother, Vivienne.

When Morgause was born, Gaius entrusted her to the care of the High Priestesses of the Old Religion and in turn spread the word throughout the court that she had died. She was believed to have been trained in the ways of the priestesses, explaining her strong and skillful magical abilities, which ultimately made her a deadly enemy to Camelot.

As an adult, Morgause returned to Camelot to challenge Arthur to single combat. As per her plan, she defeated him and spared his life after extracting a promise that he would accept a different challenge from her. She later revealed to Arthur a suspect version of the truth of Arthur's conception and birth through the summoned spirit of Ygraine. Her plot incited Arthur against Uther, and he nearly killed him. Morgause was also reunited with her younger half-sister at this time, and she gave Morgana a healing bracelet that bore the mark of the House of Gorlois and would suppress the visions that haunted Morgana's sleep.

Some months later, Morgause unleashed another attack against Camelot. She first returned the Knights of Medhir to life, and then coaxed Morgana in agreeing to assist her in removing Uther from power. Upon obtaining Morgana's compliance, Morgause put her to sleep and tied a spell that would put everyone around Morgana to sleep to Morgana's own life-force but would not affect Morgana herself. While the spell wreaked havoc on Camelot, Morgause summoned the Knights of Medhir to accompany her in invading Camelot to kill Uther. On the cusp of completing her plan, however, Morgause halted her assault when Merlin poisoned Morgana in order to break the sleeping spell. When faced with the choice of either ending the attack or losing Morgana, Morgause ultimately chose to save her half-sister's life over destroying Uther. She then fled Camelot with Morgana's unconscious body.

Over a year later, Morgause began to plot against Camelot once more, this time with Morgana as a fully willing partner. While working against the kingdom from the outside, Morgause sent her half-sister to serve as a spy and occasional assassin within the royal household itself. Their first attempt to overthrow Uther involved using magic to drive the king to madness. Then, while Uther was incapacitated, Morgause invaded Camelot with the army of her ally, Cenred, a king of a neighbouring kingdom. In the midst of the battle, Morgana unleashed the dead within the catacombs. The plot, however, was thwarted by Merlin when he defeated Morgana and ended the spell. Cenred's army was repulsed and he retreated, even over Morgause's objections.

Several weeks later, Morgause briefly slipped into Camelot itself when Morgana did not meet her for a pre-arranged meeting. Morgana then revealed to her that she was actually Uther's daughter, rather than Gorlois'. While Morgana was furious over this revelation and wished to exact revenge against Uther for decades of lies, Morgause preferred to consider the long-term ramifications of this information and urged her sister not to do anything rash. Morgana did not heed Morgause's advice and tried to murder Uther in his bed, and was barely prevented from doing so by Merlin. After these events, Morgana and Morgause's plans shifted and they began to deliberately seek Arthur's death in order to solidify Morgana's claim to the throne as Uther's only remaining offspring.

Shortly thereafter, Morgause conspired with Cenred again, this time to bring about Arthur's demise. Having learned how devoted Arthur was to Gwen, they first kidnapped her brother, Elyan, and then Gwen herself before threatening to kill Elyan if Gwen did not lead Arthur to them. Gwen did so, but with Arthur's cooperation so that they might attempt to rescue her brother. However, the two were captured, along with Merlin and Morgana, the latter of whom helped arrange the ambush. After Merlin and Arthur escaped, Arthur confronted Morgause and Cenred in an effort to 'rescue' Morgana, whom he thought was being held captive. Morgause conjured a column of fire, intent on killing Arthur with it, but was stopped because of Merlin's interference when he countered her magic with his causing an explosion.

Morgause recovered, and she reappeared in Camelot not long after. Disguised as an old woman, she met with Morgana to discuss Arthur's coming of age quest. She then gave Morgana a phoenix bracelet to give to Arthur, which would drain Arthur's life and prevent him from ever returning to Camelot. While departing, Morgause was spotted and recognised by Gwen, which led to the beginning of the maid's suspicions about Morgana's loyalties.

Some time later, Morgause yet again met with Morgana within Camelot. Her half-sister informed her of a vision where she had seen Gwen being crowned Queen of Camelot. Believing that Morgana's dream was actually a prophecy, since it should have been suppressed by Morgana's healing bracelet, Morgause urged Morgana to do whatever was necessary to prevent Gwen from ever being crowned. Their efforts would ultimately come to nothing.

Morgause's plans to capture Camelot eventually came to fruition. When she was able to capture the Cup of Life from Arthur, Merlin, and Gwaine, Morgana used it to make Cenred's army immortal and thus unstoppable. After doing so, she betrayed Cenred, ordering one of his men to kill him because she no longer had any use for him. Shortly thereafter, Morgause and her army captured Camelot and Uther. She stripped him of his crown and throne, and then directed Morgana's coronation after her sister revealed her knowledge of her true parentage.

Morgause's occupation of Camelot ultimately proved brief. Morgause led the effort to hunt down Arthur and his few remaining supporters, even convincing Morgana to let Gwen and Leon escape so they could lead her to the fugitives. In the subsequent battle to reclaim Camelot, Morgause was defeated by the combined magic of Gaius and Merlin, the latter of whom threw her against a column which rendered her unconscious. Merlin then spilled the blood held in the Cup of Life which destroyed the immortal army. Defeated, Morgana was left to flee Camelot with her sister's unconscious body, though not before Morgana swore that the crusade against Camelot had "just begun".

Over a year later, Morgause was still suffering from the injuries she'd suffered at Gaius and Merlin's hands. Knowing that she was dying, she travelled with Morgana to the Isle of the Blessed where Morgause acted as a willing blood sacrifice to allow Morgana to unleash the Dorocha on the people of Camelot. Many people died as a result of Morgana and Morgause's actions, including Lancelot, who also acted as a willing sacrifice to seal the Dorocha away again. This left Morgause trapped among the dead for good.

Though Morgause was gone, her actions had far-reaching consequences. In seducing Morgana to join her, she helped to create Camelot's most implacable enemy. Morgana did not stop her attacks until she herself was killed by Merlin. Morgana also continued to hold her half-sister's memory dear to her heart, seeking revenge against Merlin for his part in Morgause's demise and only reluctantly giving up the healing bracelet Morgause had given her to Alator of the Catha as a price for discovering the identity of Emrys.

=== Myror ===
Adrian Lester

Myror (portrayed by Adrian Lester) was an assassin/bounty hunter sent to kill Arthur by King Odin, whose son Arthur had killed in a duel. Arthur pretended to leave Camelot on a journey, with the plan of entering a fake "knight" into Camelot's jousting tournament and then taking his place in the final, so as to win by Arthur's own skill and not just because he was a prince. However, Myror deduced that Arthur had returned to Camelot, and soon tracked him to Gwen's house, where Arthur was staying. He was about to shoot Arthur but was interrupted when an armed guard passed by, looking for the assassin who had been sent after Arthur. When Myror discovered that Arthur had secretly entered the tournament, he killed Arthur's opponent and went to battle Arthur by himself. He injured Arthur with a blade hidden inside Myror's lance but Arthur returned to the field so as not to forfeit the tournament. Merlin found the body of the dead knight and worked out that it was Myror whom Arthur was fighting. Myror pulled out the blade again so Merlin used magic to cut a strap on his armour/saddle, distracting him so that Arthur could win, killing him. Arthur chose to let the fake "knight," who had secured Arthur's place in the final, take the glory. Continuing with his story that he had left Camelot before the tournament, he pretended to have killed Myror during an ambush on the way back.

== N ==
=== Nimueh ===
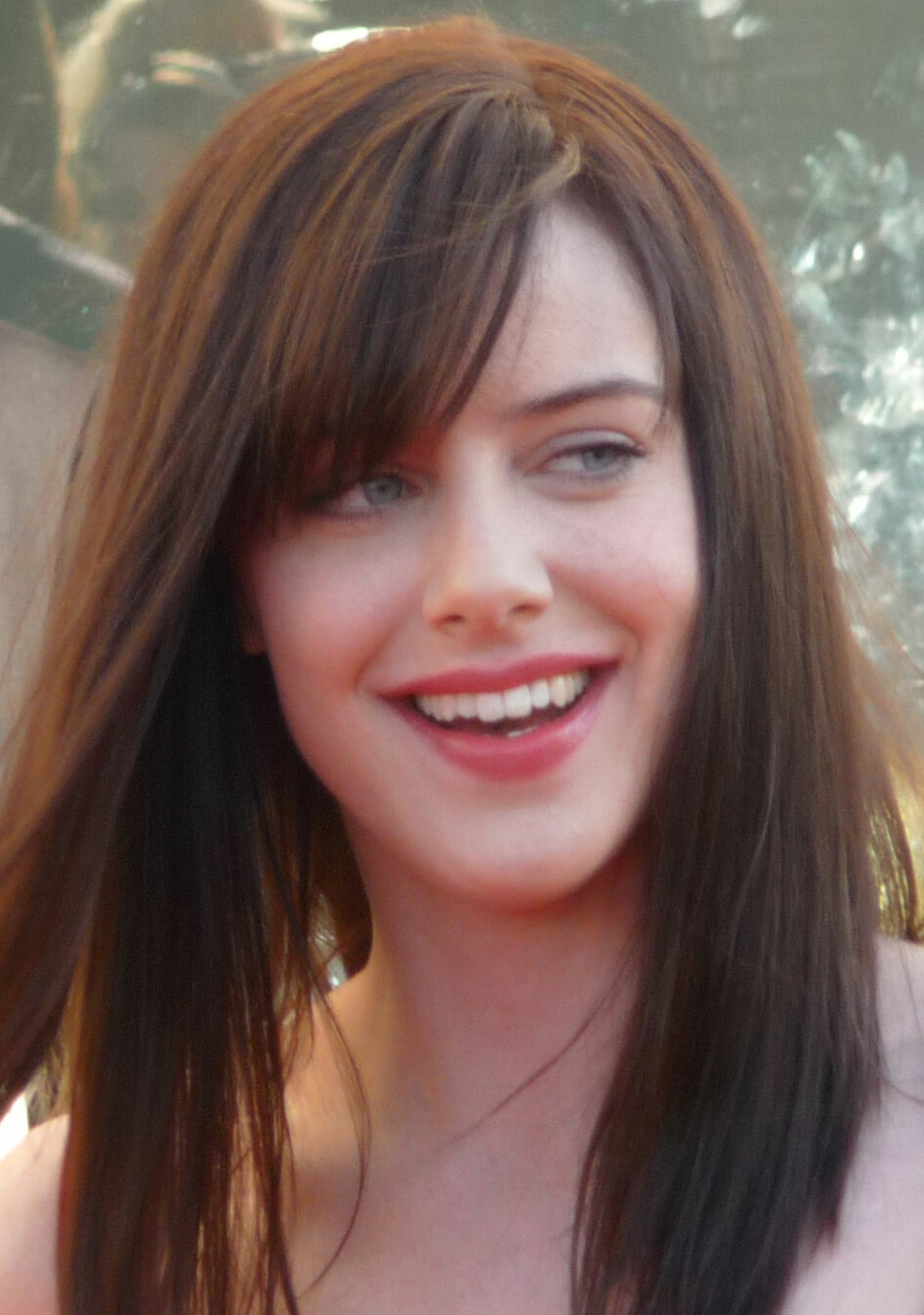
Michelle Ryan

Nimueh (portrayed by Michelle Ryan) was an antagonistic, yet beautiful witch. It is revealed in the episode "Excalibur", and through interviews with Michelle Ryan, that Nimueh was once the personal witch of the Pendragon family, and was called upon to help Uther's queen conceive. She was forced to let Arthur's mother die in childbirth in order to protect the balance of life and death. As a result, Uther banished her from Camelot, banned magic from the kingdom and swore to execute all those caught using sorcery. It is suggested that Nimueh's beautiful features are an illusion brought about by her powerful magic; she can change her appearance at will ("The Poison Chalice"), looking no older than the 21-year-old Arthur despite having been in service to his family long before his birth.

In the last episode of series 1, Nimueh offers to revive Arthur from a fatal magical wound, but she informs Merlin that there will be a heavy price to pay. Merlin says he will give his life to save Arthur's. However, Nimueh makes no comment on the matter and the spell instead takes the life of Merlin's mother. To stop Merlin from sacrificing himself, Gaius goes in his place. Once Gaius is at the brink of death, Nimueh offers to ally with Merlin, but then fights him after he refuses and is killed by a lightning bolt summoned by Merlin. Nimueh's life is taken in the place of Gaius, and he recovers soon afterwards.

== O ==
=== Owain ===
Sir Owain (portrayed by Kyle Redmond-Jones) was a royal knight of Camelot. He died while fighting the mysterious "Black Knight", who was in fact the reanimated form of Uther Pendragon's late brother-in-law Tristan De Bois, brought back as an immortal wraith by Nimueh's magic.

=== Odin ===
King Odin (portrayed by Fintan McKeown) is the ruler of a kingdom neighbouring Camelot. Arthur killed his son in single combat. Though Arthur did not have a quarrel with the boy, the other prince would not back down from the challenge. In retaliation, Odin sent a professional assassin, Myror to Camelot to attempt to kill Arthur in the episode "The Once and Future Queen". Myror took the place of Arthur's opponent in the joust, and Merlin had to use his magic to loosen the strap on his horse's saddle in order to save Arthur. Uther wanted to make war against him, but Arthur talked him out of it, saying Odin had been motivated by grief. In The Wicked Day, Odin sends The Gleeman to assassinate Arthur. He fails in this task, but succeeds in fatally injuring and later killing Uther. Several years later, Odin helps in a plot with Morgana by kidnapping King Rodor to lure Arthur into a trap. Merlin interferes and foils the attack, but Odin then corners the King in a gorge. Arthur defeats Odin in single combat, sparing his enemy's life and finally bringing a truce between the two kingdoms.

=== Olaf ===
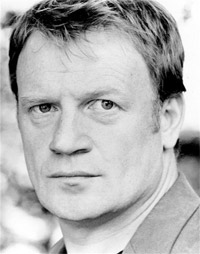
Mark Lewis Jones

King Olaf (portrayed by Mark Lewis Jones) is the ruler of a kingdom neighbouring Camelot. Olaf has a daughter, Vivian, who along with Arthur, was enchanted by King Alined and Trickler so that they would fall in love and provoke Uther and Olaf to war. ("Sweet Dreams"). Olaf challenges Arthur to a fight to the death when he and Uther discover Arthur and Vivian kissing. Arthur is so distracted by the love spell, though, that he is nearly killed before Gwen arrives and breaks the spell with a kiss. Arthur disarms Olaf, but does not kill him, as that is not the way to make peace.

=== Osgar ===
Osgar (portrayed by Andrew Tiernan) was a sorcerer who had killed one of the King's knights, Sir Ranulph (se5 ep5). He was a sorcerer that had worked to bring justice upon the ones defying The Triple Goddess. He was killed by Sir Gwaine.

== P ==
=== Pellinor ===
Sir Pellinor (portrayed by Sean Francis) was a royal knight of Camelot who died in mortal combat with the "Black Knight", really the undead Tristan de Bois.

=== Percival ===
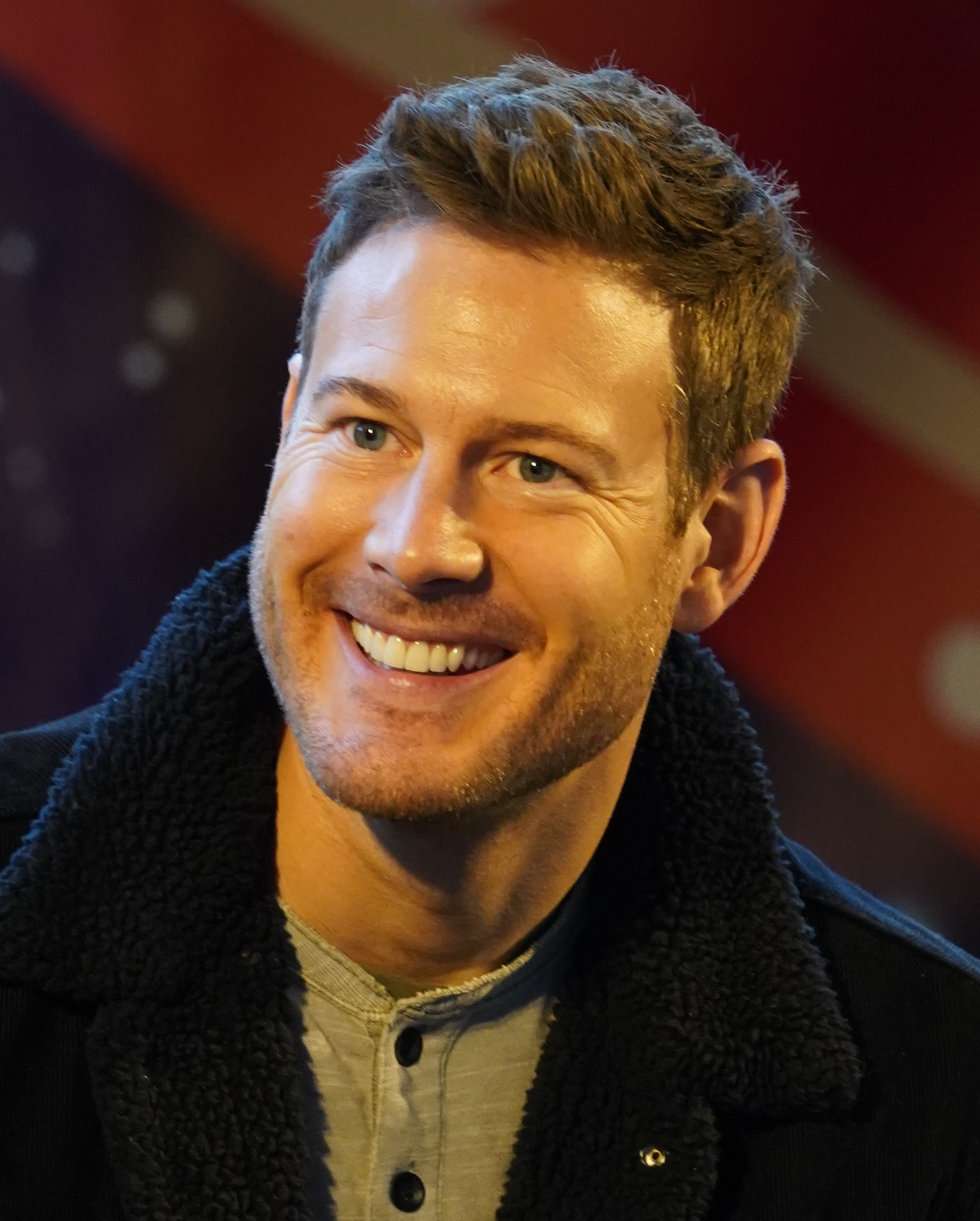
Tom Hopper

Sir Percival (portrayed by Tom Hopper) is a friend of Lancelot who accompanied him after Merlin sent a message requesting Lancelot's aid after Morgana's takeover of Camelot. In a deleted scene, Lancelot revealed that "Cenred's men raided his village and killed his family" and as soon as he had heard Lancelot was going to Camelot to fight them he volunteered his services to help. Demonstrating great physical strength, Percival triggered a rockslide that saved Arthur and his allies from Morgause's attacking immortal knights, prompting Arthur to ask Percival to call him 'Arthur' rather than 'Your Highness' despite the fact that the two had only just met. Not long after, Percival swore allegiance to Arthur and aids him in the subsequent attempt to retake Camelot, stating that Arthur's enemies were his enemies. In recognition of his bravery, Arthur knighted Percival as a knight of Camelot despite his lack of noble birth. Following the battle, Percival accompanied Gwen and the other Knights of the Round Table back to Camelot, the group now dressed in the cloaks and armour of true Knights of Camelot. Despite his size and strength, Percival is a gentle giant who only uses his strength when the situation demands it. Other than that, he is kind with a good sense of humour and has been shown to have an especially strong friendship with his fellow knight Gwaine. Percival was one of Uther's target's when Uther was a spirit, taking vengeance on Arthur's 'bad choices'. Percival was stabbed through the shoulder by an axe Uther made fly at him, presumably because Percival is not of noble blood. Percival caught Guinevere when she was sneaking out to meet Morgana, but when she said she was going to the town because it reminded her of her brother, Percival showed sympathy and promised not to tell anyone that she had been gone.

Percival survives the battle of Camlann and joins Gwaine to hunt down Morgana. They fail to injure the sorceress and are bound by ropes in the forest. Percival hears the screams of Gwaine's torture and breaks free, only to find Morgana gone and Gwaine dying. He returns to Camelot and is present when Guinevere takes Arthur's place as ruler of Camelot.

== R ==
=== Ruadan ===
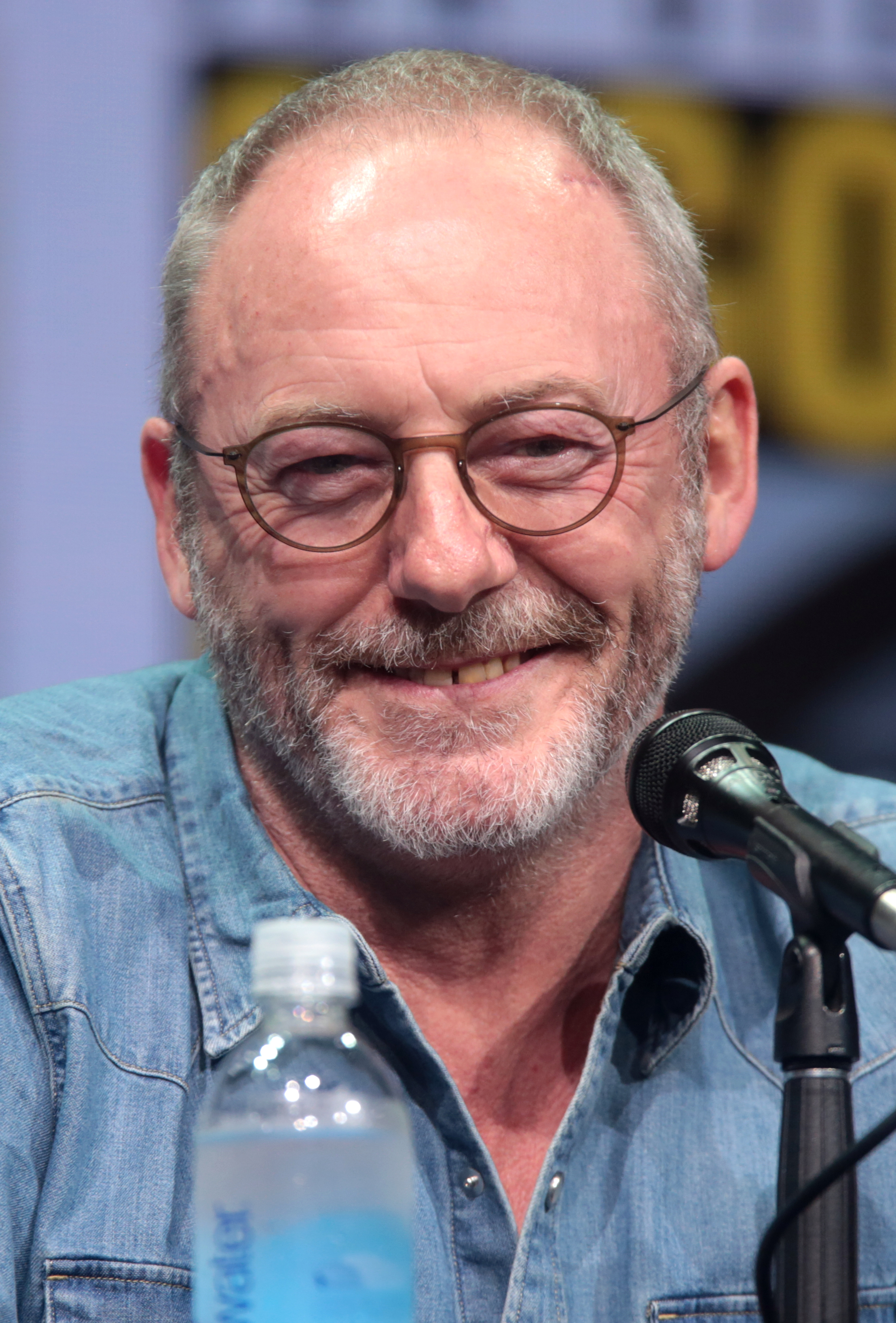
Liam Cunningham

Ruadan (Portrayed by Liam Cunningham) was a Druid leader who owned the fortress of Izmir. He had a brief alliance with Morgana. His daughter was Sefa, a mole in Camelot, who he rescues when discovered as being a spy and sentenced to death. He is killed in the process.

=== King Rodor ===
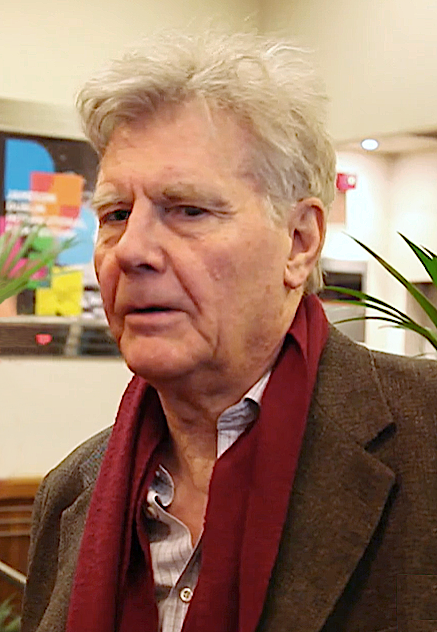
James Fox

King Rodor (Portrayed by James Fox) is Princess Mithian's father.

== S ==
=== Sarrum ===
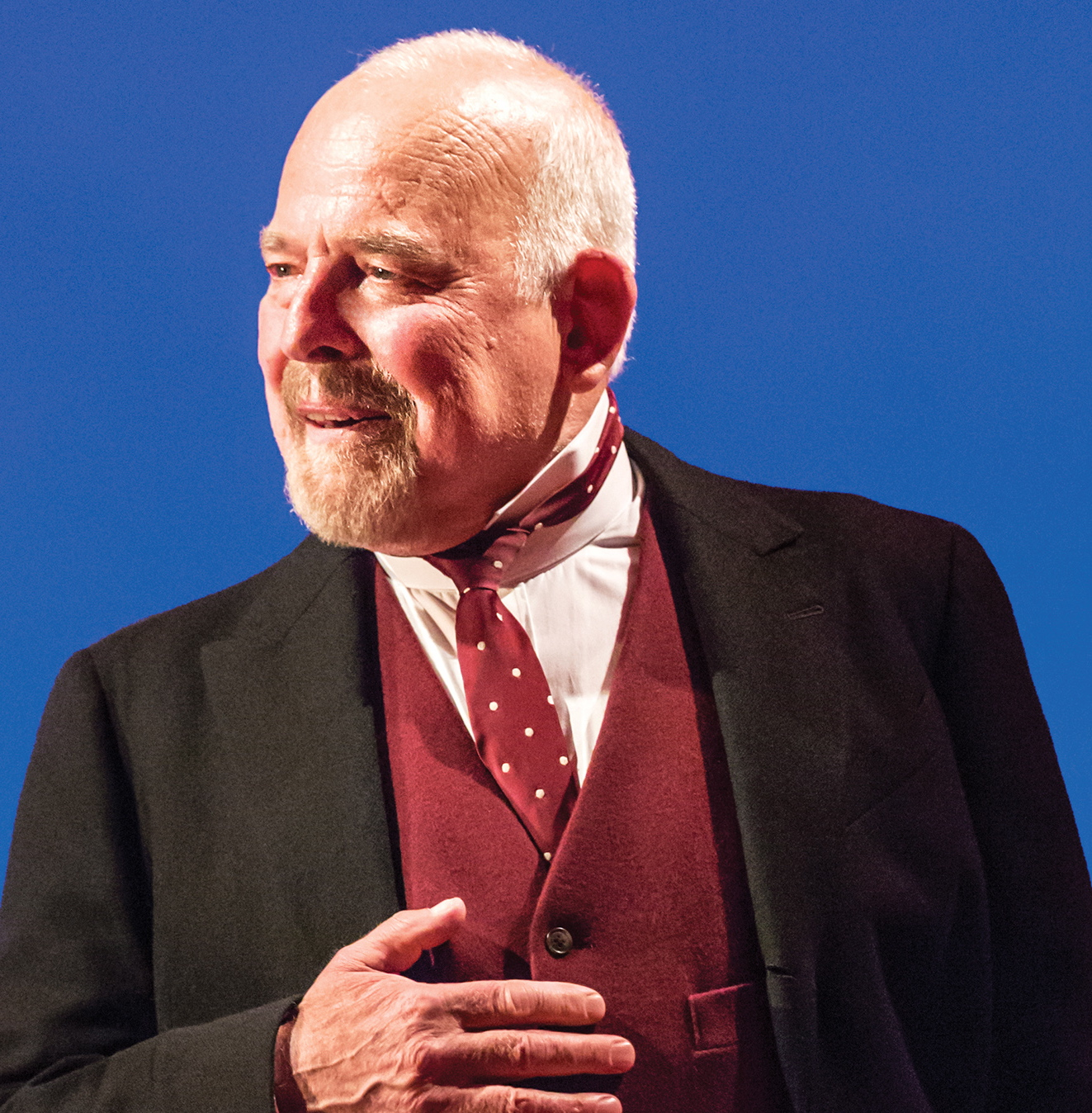
John Shrapnel

Sarrum (John Shrapnel) was the Overlord that first captured Aithusa and then using her as bait to lure Morgana into a trap. He held the two of them for two years in an abandoned and long dried up well causing damage to both of their minds and also physically stunting the white dragon's growth. This was revealed in Season 5 Episode 7 when Arthur meets with him and an enchanted Guinevere commissions him to kill Arthur for her, since the skill of his men and his hatred of Morgana makes him the perfect unwitting accomplice. Sarrum plans to have the king shot at the signing of a treaty, but Merlin intervenes and the assassin shoots and kills Sarrum instead.

=== Sefa ===
Sefa (portrayed by Sophie Rundle) was the servant of Queen Guinevere in "Arthur's Bane, Part One", the opening episode of Series 5, Sefa was caught listening to Camelot's councils meeting about how they would attack Izmir, Ruadan's (Ruadan had a brief alliance with Morgana) fortress, however Sefa claimed she was bringing in the Queen's dinner and was believed. But, it turned out that Sefa was in fact Ruadan's daughter and she had been placed in Camelot as a mole for Ruadan. With the information given from Sefa, Ruadan and Morgana ambushed the Knights of Camelot, who were on their way to rescue the captured Percival and Gwaine, who returned to Camelot claiming that there must have been a spy in their midst who had given the information of their whereabouts to Morgana and Ruadan. Guinevere figured it must have been Sefa who had betrayed them and Sefa confessed to the crime, being sentenced to death by Gwen in the absence of Arthur. In the following episode, "Arthur's Bane, Part Two", Sefa is due to be hanged for treason. However, Gwen reveals that she will not hang Sefa as she is just trying to capture Ruadan who she will hope will come rescue his daughter. Ruadan does show and does rescue Sefa, however, is stabbed in the process. He and Sefa escape but Ruadan dies a few miles out of Camelot and Sefa runs off, her current whereabouts are unknown.

=== Sophia ===
Sophia (portrayed by Holliday Grainger) was a beautiful young woman who appeared in Camelot with her elderly father, Aulfric. Morgana had a terrifying dream of Arthur dying at Sophia's hands. It emerged that Sophia and Aulfric were Sidhe, magical creatures exiled from the land of eternal life and condemned to live as humans as penalty for Aulfric murdering another Sidhe. Aulfric bargained with the Sidhe elders for Sophia to return, and they ordered that she sacrifice the soul of a mortal prince to appease the elders. Sophia bewitched Arthur and nearly killed him by drowning him in the lake, but was herself killed by Merlin using her own magical staff.

== T ==
=== Taliesin ===
Taliesin (portrayed by Karl Johnson) was a seer over three centuries before the events of the show. Using the mysteries of the Crystal Cave, he was able to see the future in great depth. Although he died years ago, he appeared to Merlin- it was unspecified whether Taliesin had left a magical 'recording' of himself to pass on his message, had come forward in time from the past, or if this was merely his ghost- when Arthur was badly injured by an arrow, healing Arthur's wound and subsequently taking Merlin—whom he referred to as 'Emrys'--to the Crystal Cave, where he showed Merlin the crystals, explaining that only a few rare individuals are able to use the crystals to see the future. He claimed to have seen visions of Merlin during his lifetime, hinting at Merlin's great destiny in the future.

=== Tauren ===
Tauren (portrayed by Cal Macaninch) was a sorcerer who led a gang of renegade wizards with the aim of bringing down Uther Pendragon. He enlisted the help of Gwen's father, Tom, to perform alchemy with the use of a magical stone but escaped when Tom was caught by the royal guards. He later conspired with Morgana to bring Uther to her father's grave where he could be killed by Tauren, Morgana angered at Uther's recent order to execute Tom simply for participating in alchemy when he had no way of knowing what he was involved in. Morgana, however, had a change of heart as Uther apologised to her for ordering Tom's execution. Tauren then attacked Uther and was fatally wounded by Morgana.

=== Tom ===
Tom (portrayed by David Durham) was the father of Guinevere and Elyan. He worked as a blacksmith in Camelot. When Nimueh poisoned the city's water supply, he fell victim to the magical plague which had killed many others. Merlin cured him using magic, resulting in Gwen being blamed for causing the plague. She was arrested for witchcraft but later released, and joyfully reunited with her father. Tom made the sword which became Excalibur when the Great Dragon gave it magical powers for Arthur's use. He later became involved in a plot by a sorcerer, Tauren, to perform alchemy using the legendary Philosopher's Stone (referred to in dialogue as the "Mage Stone"). Tom was arrested and put on trial for treason in unwittingly assisting a known enemy of Camelot, because Uther believed that Tom was supplying weapons to Tauren. Morgana suspected that the trial was a formality and Uther planned to have Tom executed anyway just to make an example of him. He was then killed by soldiers after she helped him to escape from the dungeons.

=== Tristan De Bois ===
Tristan De Bois (portrayed by Rick English and voiced by Christopher Fairbank) was Uther Pendragon's brother-in-law and Arthur's uncle. He blamed Uther for his sister's death in childbirth and was killed by Uther in a duel to the death. His final words swore vengeance on Uther. Nimueh later used necromancy to bring him back as an undead wraith, harnessing the power of De Bois's suffering while he was alive. The Knight then stormed Arthur's investiture as Crown Prince and challenged those at court to single combat. Immune to all mortal weapons, De Bois killed two of Camelot's knights before being challenged by Arthur himself. Knowing that the spell would not end naturally until the wraith had killed Uther, Merlin had the Great Dragon burnish a sword with his fire to create a weapon that could kill the wraith, forging Excalibur. However, Uther had Arthur drugged and locked him in his chambers, before taking to the field using Excalibur. Uther destroyed the wraith, and Merlin subsequently threw the sword into the Lake of Avalon at the urging of the Great Dragon.

=== Tristan ===
Tristan (portrayed by Ben Daniels) is the love of Isolde and her fellow smuggler. Has intensely dislikes the king because he believes taxes on the people are too high which has led him to smuggle. After Isolde catches Arthur and Merlin watching their camp, Tristan allows them to travel with the smugglers for the time being. When they are invaded by bandits, Arthur, who has been relieved of Merlin's spell, saves them. Tristan is devastated when Isolde is wounded and agrees to allow Merlin to treat her in Ealdor. As Agravaine and his men have found them at Ealdor, Tristan runs and hides in the woods along with Guinevere, Merlin, Arthur and Isolde. They venture to Camelot to take back what is rightfully Arthur's which results in Isolde's death. Tristan confirms his love for her with a kiss upon her lips after she dies.

== U ==
=== Uther Pendragon ===
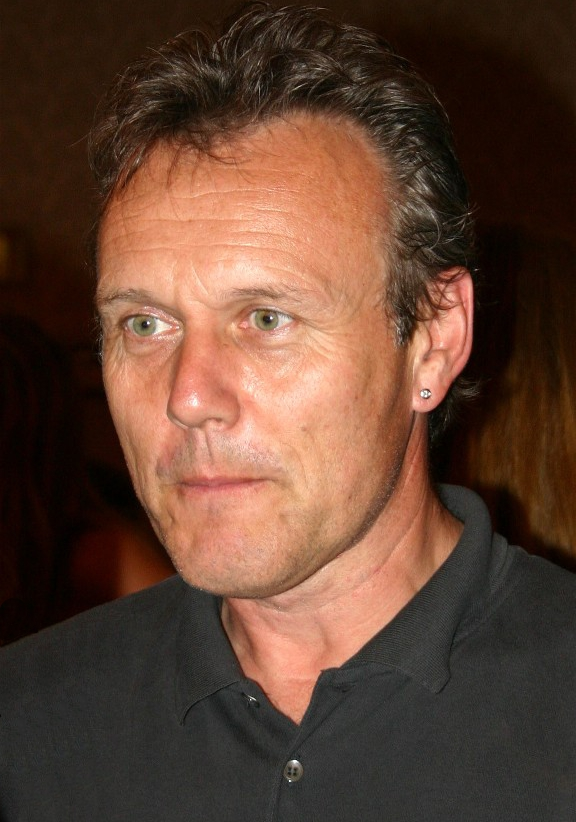
Anthony Head

Uther Pendragon (portrayed by Anthony Head) was the king of Camelot. He took the realm by force and ruled competently for many years, creating prosperity for his people. His wife, Ygraine, was unable to conceive, so Uther made a magical deal so she could bear him a son; however, the enchantment cost Ygraine her life. Stricken with grief, Uther outwardly blamed sorcery for his wife's death, and vowed revenge on all forms of magic. He began "The Great Purge", which led to a near extinction of sorcerers in the realm. This included slaughtering the dragons until only the Great Dragon is left as a prisoner beneath the castle. Some time later, he took Morgana, the supposedly orphaned daughter of his close friends Gorlois and Vivianne to raise as his ward alongside Arthur. Uther knew he was her father, but did not tell anybody this secret for at least 20 years.

In the first 3 series, Uther rules his kingdom successfully, but is typically blindsided when dealing with magic, choosing simple solutions that often fail to root out those who wish Camelot harm. Uther remains unaware of Merlin's hand in protecting the kingdom, often from enemies seeking revenge for his cruelty, not least Nimueh and the Great Dragon. However, the worst consequence of Uther's genocide against magic is that Morgana, gifted with magic, grows to despise him and plots his downfall. At the end of Series 3, he is imprisoned by Morgana and tortured, but is eventually rescued by Arthur and his knights with Merlin. The betrayal shatters Uther's spirit and he is unable to lead the realm afterwards, so Arthur takes over with assistance from his uncle Agravaine. In the series 4 episode The Wicked Day, Uther protects Arthur from an assassin (hired by Odin) by placing himself between his son and the assassin's knife. Uther is critically wounded, and Merlin attempts to heal him with magic, but is unsuccessful, as unbeknownst to him, Morgana and Agravaine have placed a necklace on Uther to make Merlin's magic harmful. Uther dies, making Arthur the king.

Uther returns in the episode, "The Death-Song of Uther Pendragon" – a downcast Arthur seeks to contact his soul on the anniversary of his death. The young king ends up very disappointed by the reunion; Uther disagrees with almost all of the changes Arthur has made, including the knighting of common-born men, the very idea of the Round Table and crowning Guinevere queen. A sorrowful Arthur departs, but inadvertently allows his father's spirit to escape the Otherworld when he looks back at him. Uther returns to the castle as a vengeful ghost, attacking anything that he thinks is leading Arthur astray, eventually resolving to rule Camelot as a spirit. Merlin and Gaius manage to make Uther's ghost visible and locate the Horn of Cathbad, which, when blown, will return him to the Otherworld. Uther knocks out Arthur, but Merlin reveals his magic and drives Uther away briefly. Before Uther can kill Merlin, Arthur confronts him again and blows the horn. Uther tries to reveal Merlin's magic to his son, but is forced back to the Otherworld before he can reveal the secret.

== V ==
=== Valiant ===
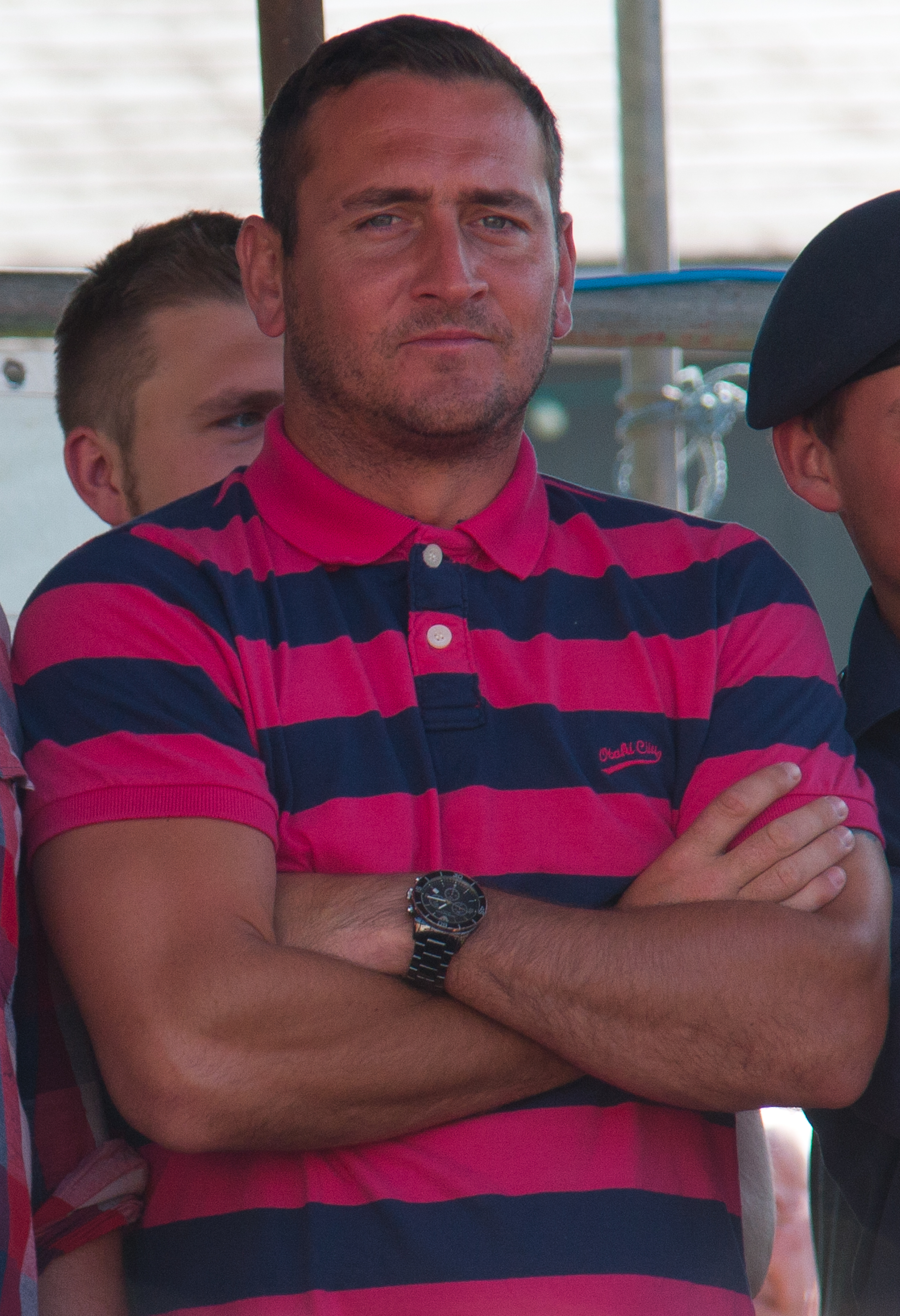
Will Mellor

Knight Valiant (portrayed by Will Mellor) was a knight from the Western Isles, who came to Camelot to battle in the annual sword-fighting tournament. Unknown to others, he was cheating by using a magical shield (acquired from a sorcerer named Devlin, that he then killed) covered with painted snakes, which came to life at Valiant's command. He planned to kill Prince Arthur with the snakes, take the title of champion and win the heart of Morgana. However, his use of magic was revealed by Merlin and Arthur killed Knight Valiant in the finale of the tournament.

=== Vivian ===
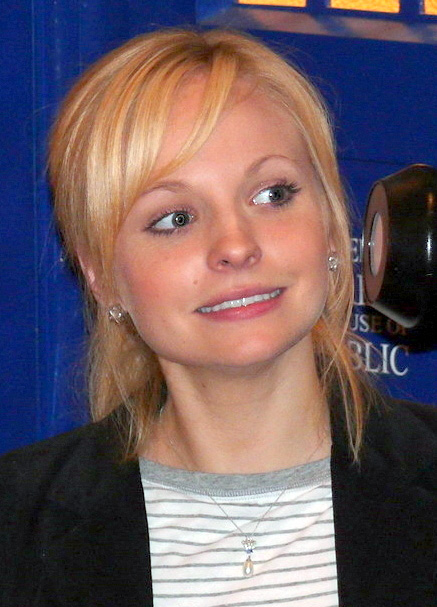
Georgia Tennant

Lady Vivian (portrayed by Georgia Tennant) is the daughter of King Olaf, who came to Camelot with three other kings to sign a peace treaty. Taking advantage of her paranoid and almost insanely overprotective father, another king arranged for Arthur to be enchanted to fall in love with her, hoping that the subsequent duel between Arthur and Olaf when Olaf discovered this 'insult' to his wishes would result in the death of one and the subsequent declaration of war. But, Vivian did not love Arthur and was described as the only woman in the kingdom not to love him. So, the warmongering king had her enchanted as well, making her fall desperately in love with Arthur. Although Merlin and Gwen were able to break Arthur's enchantment, Vivian apparently remained in love with Arthur as she departed Camelot; it is unknown if the spell will wear off over time or she will be forever be under its effects.

=== Vivienne ===
Vivienne is the absent mother of Morgana and Morgause and wife of Gorlois. Presumably before she was married, she became pregnant with a baby girl. She named the girl Morgause, gave her a bracelet bearing the mark of the house of Gorlois, then gave her to Gaius to smuggle out of Camelot. He entrusted her to the High Priestesses of the Old Religion. Vivienne then resumed her life as normal, married Gorlois and, some years later, became pregnant with another girl. What Gorlois, however, did not know was that while he was away fighting for King Uther Pendragon, Vivienne had had a brief affair with Uther.

When Gorlois died, Vivienne disappeared leaving Morgana in the care of Uther as a (supposed) orphan. She has not been seen since, but has been mentioned in The Crystal Cave, when Morgana's true parentage was revealed.

The affair was realised by Morgana in Series 3, 23 years later. Morgana was outraged that Uther did not tell her that he was her father by the adulterous relationship.

== W ==
=== William ===
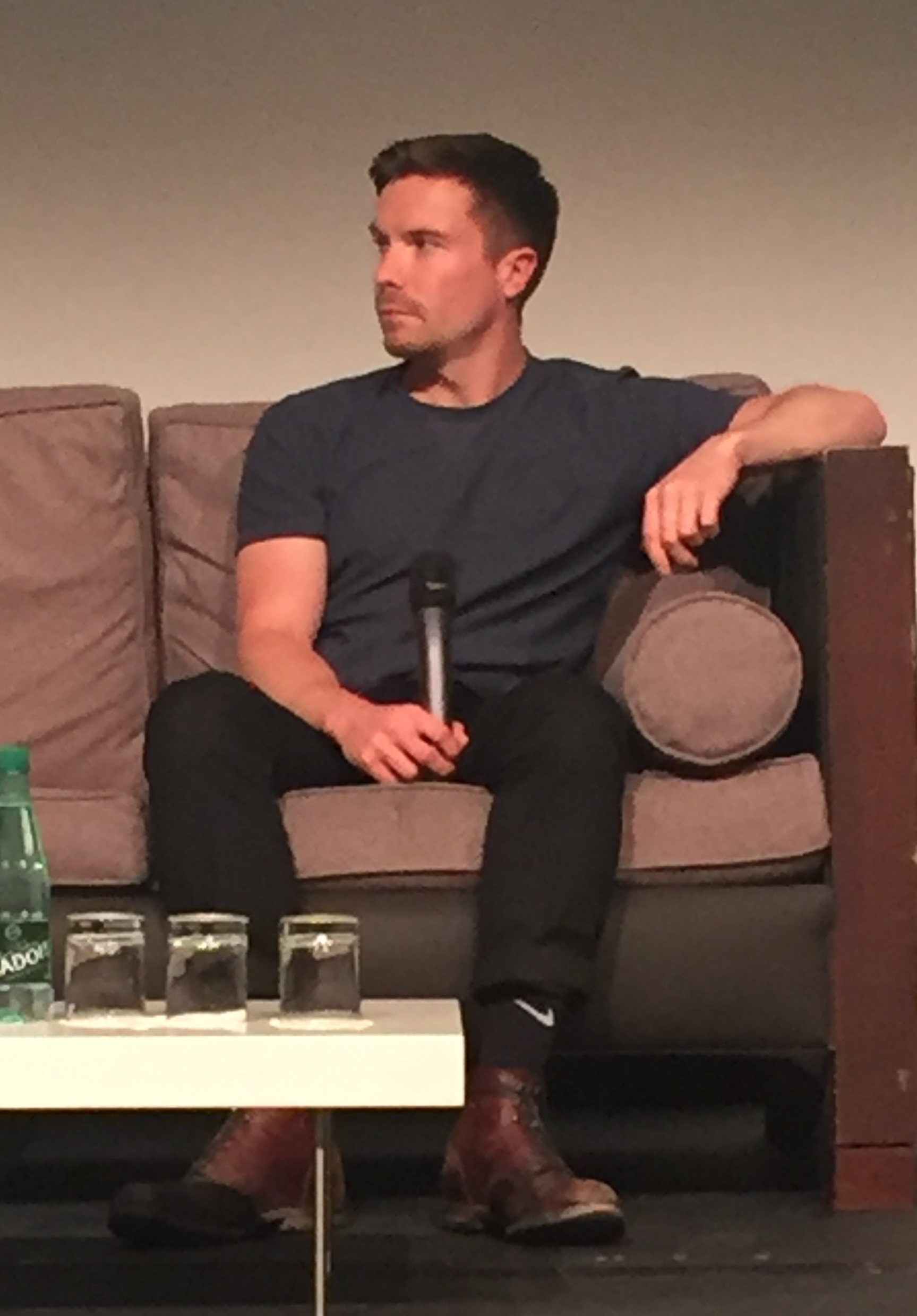
Joe Dempsie

William "Will" (portrayed by Joe Dempsie) was a childhood friend of Merlin. He had an extreme dislike of nobility because his father died in service to a royal army. When Prince Arthur came to defend Merlin's home village from raiders, Will initially accused Arthur of using the villagers as cannon fodder; however, Will eventually saw that Arthur was not afraid to risk his own life in battle. Will died defending Arthur from being hit by a crossbow, fired by the leader of the defeated raiders. Arthur knew that magic had been used to drive the raiders away, and the dying Will took responsibility for this in order to protect Merlin.

=== William of Daira ===
Sir William of Daira (portrayed by Alex Price) is a knight who comes to Camelot for a jousting tournament. In the episode "The Once and Future Queen" Arthur plans to enter the tournament without any of the other competitors knowing who he is and consequently avoiding any special treatment. In truth, 'Sir William' is really a farmer from one of the outer villages. His purpose is to pretend to be a knight taking part in the tournament, when in reality Arthur will be jousting in his place. He does not look the part, despite Merlin and Gwen's best efforts, but manages to act the part after he is given advice on nobility and arrogance from Arthur. When Arthur wins the tournament, he lets the farmer posing as 'Sir William' take the glory, as Arthur feels it is a time for humility.

== Y ==
=== Ygraine Pendragon ===
Ygraine Pendragon (portrayed by Alice Patten) was the wife of Uther Pendragon and mother of Arthur. Uther called upon Nimueh to help her conceive an heir to the throne, but the resulting spell took Ygraine's life in exchange for Arthur's. Mad with grief, Uther convinced himself Nimueh knew the enchantment would kill his wife, and began the Great Purge to destroy all magic in the world. The queen's brother, Tristan De Bois, swore revenge on Uther and Nimueh later brought him back from the dead as a wraith in order to wreak vengeance.

An apparition of Ygraine appears in "The Sins of the Father", in which Arthur learns the secret of his birth through Morgause, with Ygraine claiming that Uther went to Nimueh without her knowledge and in full awareness that her life would be the price paid for Arthur's birth. The precise truth of this bargain was never answered beyond doubt in the show, so it is possible the apparition was Ygraine's real spirit, or an illusion partly or entirely devised by Morgause.

Ygraine also appears in "The Tears of Uther Pendragon, Part 1" as one of Uther's hallucinations, grabbing and hanging on to Uther's arm in a well.

She is also the sister of Lord Agravaine.
