= Merlin series 3 =

Merlin
- Series 3
- DVD cover
- No. of episodes: 13

Release
- Original network: BBC
- Original release: 11 September – 4 December 2010

Series chronology
- ← Previous; Series 2 Next → Series 4

The third series of Merlin began on 11 September 2010. Series three regular cast members include Colin Morgan, Bradley James, Katie McGrath, Angel Coulby, Anthony Head, and Richard Wilson, as well as Emilia Fox joining the regular cast. John Hurt took his previous role as the voice of the Great Dragon but was no longer one of the regular cast (though he continued to provide the opening narration for the series). Series three consists of 13 episodes. The series three premiere was watched by 6.49 million viewers.

Series 3 introduced the format of a two-part opener and two-part finale. This format was retained for Series 4 and Series 5. The series was notable for the change in character of Morgana from the sympathetic heroine in the first two series to the villain in series 3, keeping with the historical concept of Morgana as Merlin's nemesis in the legends of King Arthur. BBC officially renewed the show for series 4 on 10 October 2010.

== Plot ==
Camelot rejoices as the Lady Morgana is found and returned home, however not all is at it seems for Merlin, as he soon learns that Morgana has changed for the worse. Now in league with Morgause, Morgana's powers begin to grow and she becomes a deadly enemy within the walls of Camelot, but with Uther and the kingdom blind to her treachery, can Merlin thwart her plans before she can destroy Camelot?

Loyalties are tested to the limit as a dangerous game is played for the throne. Old friends return to the kingdom, and new enemies grow stronger outside the walls of Camelot. Merlin must be more alert than ever if he is to protect Prince Arthur, for his greatest enemy is now within the castle walls....Morgana. As the King's loving ward plays her game of lies and manipulation, can Merlin stop Morgana before Camelot is lost forever, or is the kingdom set to crumble under the force of secrets and lies?

== Cast ==
=== Main cast ===
- Colin Morgan as Merlin
- Angel Coulby as Gwen
- Bradley James as Arthur
- Katie McGrath as Morgana
- Anthony Head as Uther Pendragon
- Richard Wilson as Gaius

=== Recurring ===
- John Hurt as the Great Dragon (voice)
- Emilia Fox as Morgause
- Rupert Young as Sir Leon
- Eoin Macken as Gwaine
- Adetomiwa Edun as Elyan
- Michael Cronin as Geoffrey of Monmouth
- Tom Ellis as King Cenred
- Alice Patten as Ygraine

=== Guest stars ===
- Mark Williams as the Goblin (voice)
- Karl Johnson as Taliesin
- Miriam Margolyes as Grunhilda
- Georgia King as Elena
- Simon Williams as Lord Godwyn
- Warwick Davis as Grettir
- Donald Sumpter as the Fisher King
- Pauline Collins as Alice
- Eddie Marsan as the Manticore (voice)
- Harry Melling as Gilli
- Ralph Ineson as Jarl
- Laura Donnelly as Freya
- Santiago Cabrera as Lancelot
- Tom Hopper as Percival

== Episodes ==
No. overall	No. in series	Title	Directed by	Written by	Original release date	UK viewers (millions)
27	1	"The Tears of Uther Pendragon – Part 1"	Jeremy Webb	Julian Jones	11 September 2010	6.49
A year has passed with many fruitless quests in search of the missing Lady Morgana. The despondent Prince is all but ready to give up, but as he and Merlin recover from their latest skirmish a bruised, bloodied figure emerges from the mist; it is the Lady Morgana. King Uther is overjoyed, but then starts to lose his mind. Merlin thinks that magic is the cause; could this be the work of his dutiful ward? The young warlock puts himself in grave danger trying to find out whose side Morgana is really on, and he's forced to call the Great Dragon to save himself.
28	2	"The Tears of Uther Pendragon – Part 2"	Jeremy Webb	Julian Jones	18 September 2010	6.06
With Merlin gravely ill from the Serket's poison, Morgana and Morgause continue with their evil plan. They have mentally incapacitated Uther and convinced his enemy, Cenred, to invade Camelot. The fate of the kingdom now rests on Arthur's shoulders. The Prince and his Knights resist the invaders, but Cenred's soldiers are not the only threat they face. Morgana invokes a dead army that cannot be killed by normal means. Merlin fights Morgana and destroys her magical artifact, forcing Cenred to withdraw. But Morgana manages to make Uther believe it was her doing, and she's hailed as the heroine of the battle.
29	3	"Goblin's Gold"	Jeremy Webb	Howard Overman	25 September 2010	6.22
After stumbling into a secret chamber, Merlin releases a mysterious goblin with a penchant for making trouble and a lust for gold. It takes control of Gaius and causes all sorts of mischief. Merlin searches for a way to free Gaius, but finally he has to resort to poisoning Gaius to force the goblin out of his body. After giving him the antidote, the captured goblin is presented to the court as the true culprit of all the mischief.
30	4	"Gwaine"	David Moore	Julian Jones	2 October 2010	6.42
Merlin and Arthur find themselves outnumbered in a bar fight but an enigmatic young man helps them win. The man’s name is Gwaine and he risks his own life to protect Arthur but during his act of bravery he is seriously wounded. The Prince decides to take him back to Camelot where he could make a recovery with Gaius' help. Meanwhile, the two thugs they've defeated use sorcery to replace two knights and plot to murder the Prince during the tournament. Merlin finds out the sorcery they're using and foils their plans with Gwaine's help, but Uther exiles him from Camelot for attacking a knight.
31	5	"The Crystal Cave"	Alice Troughton	Julian Jones	9 October 2010	6.36
When Merlin enters the Crystal Cave, an old sorcerer shows Merlin a vision of the near future in which Morgana appears to kill Uther. Events begin unfolding as they did in the vision and Merlin misinterprets Morgana's nighttime visit to Morgause as sneaking off to kill Uther. Merlin tries to stop her, accidentally fracturing Morgana's skull. Merlin cannot live with Arthur and Uther's extreme anguish over Morgana's impending death and forces the Great Dragon to help save her. Unfortunately, Uther's grief makes him confess to Gaius that Morgana is his daughter, which she remembers after Merlin's heals her. Morgana is bitter at the revelation and Merlin has to foil the real assassination attempt, the one he saw in the crystal.
32	6	"The Changeling"	David Moore	Lucy Watkins	16 October 2010	6.40
Uther has Arthur get engaged to Princess Elena, who arrives in Camelot. Elena is not dainty or lady-like and Arthur does not love her. Furthermore, her nanny, Grunhilda, is working for the Sidhe (pronounced "Shee") Elder to use Arthur's marriage to take over Camelot. As Merlin and Gaius battle Grunhilda to free Elena from the Sidhe, Arthur must decide if he will go through with the wedding. He finally decides not to, as he wishes to marry for love, and Elena fully agrees with him.
33	7	"The Castle of Fyrien"	David Moore	Jake Michie	23 October 2010	6.82
Gwen is kidnapped one night as part of a plot by Morgana, Morgause and Cenred. Cenred has Gwen's estranged brother Elyan captive at Castle Fyrien and, after a quick reunion, releases Gwen with a choice: bring Arthur to Cenred or Elyan will die. Arthur, Merlin and Gwen plan to save Elyan by using a secret entrance to Castle Fyrien, but things get complicated when Morgana decides to come with them and betrays their position to her allies. Cenred captures them, but they manage to escape.
34	8	"The Eye of the Phoenix"	Alice Troughton	Julian Jones	30 October 2010	6.92
Arthur sets out on a quest to retrieve the Golden Trident from the Fisher King's Realm. Morgause tells Morgana to give Arthur the Eye of the Phoenix, which will consume his life force. When Merlin finds out, he goes in search of Gwaine and they follow Arthur into the Fisher King's Realm. Meanwhile, Gwen grows suspicious of Morgana and sees her doing magic. Merlin finds the Fisher King, who reveals it was really Merlin's quest. The King gives him water from the Lake of Avalon in exchange for the Eye of the Phoenix Merlin took from Arthur. Arthur finds the trident, and they head back, but Gwaine says goodbye at the border, since he's still banished.
35	9	"Love in the Time of Dragons"	Alice Troughton	Jake Michie	6 November 2010	6.90
When Alice, a physician and Gaius' old love, returns to Camelot, he is smitten again. However, she brings a Manticore with a plan to kill Uther with poison from its scorpion tail. Merlin tries to tell Gaius, but he won't listen. When Uther is poisoned, Merlin is forced to reveal Alice's participation to Arthur. Merlin and Gaius destroy the Manticore, which was controlling Alice, but Uther condemns Alice to death for using magic. In the end, Alice escapes, and it is implied Gaius helped her.
36	10	"Queen of Hearts"	Ashley Way	Howard Overman	13 November 2010	7.37
Morgana has visions about Gwen being crowned as Queen of Camelot. Morgause tells her that to prevent this she must find a way to split Gwen and Arthur up. Morgana first leads Uther to Arthur and Gwen's date, causing the king to banish Gwen from Camelot. When it seems that Morgana's plan has backfired, Gwen is accused of being a sorceress thanks to evidence that Morgana planted in Arthur's room. Merlin uses an ageing spell to disguise himself as the real culprit and save Gwen. However, he has trouble reversing the spell, and only Gaius' timely help saves him from being burned at the stake.
37	11	"The Sorcerer's Shadow"	Ashley Way	Julian Jones	20 November 2010	7.42
As another tournament descends on Camelot, a young man known as Gilli sets his sights on victory. Gilli uses magic in the tournament to win his fights, and by doing so he begins to realize the true strength of his powers, and the glory that he could possibly use them to achieve. Meanwhile, Morgana manipulates Uther and Arthur into competing against each other.
38	12	"The Coming of Arthur – Part 1"	Jeremy Webb	Jake Michie	27 November 2010	7.12
After the druids save Sir Leon's life with the Cup of Life, Uther orders Arthur to retrieve it before it ends up in the wrong hands, but Morgana tips off Morgause about it. On their way to Cenred's kingdom, they're captured by the slave trader Jarl, but manage to escape alongside fellow prisoner Gwaine. They manage to get the Cup, but quickly lose it to Morgause, after Arthur is shot with a poisoned arrow. Morgause uses the cup to make Cenred's army immortal and then kills Cenred. With an immortal army on side, Morgause takes over Camelot. In the citadel, they find Elyan and Gaius still alive. Merlin and Arthur secretly watch in horror as Morgana reveals her true allegiance (as well as her parentage) and is crowned Queen of Camelot.
39	13	"The Coming of Arthur – Part 2"	Jeremy Webb	Julian Jones	4 December 2010	7.67
Morgana has taken Uther's place on the throne, while Uther sits defenseless and alone in the castle dungeons. Gwen and Sir Leon escape from Camelot to join up with Arthur and his friends in exile. Freya appears to Merlin, urging him to get Excalibur. After finding the Round Table, Arthur knights Lancelot, Gwaine, Elyan and Percival and they plan a counter attack. While Arthur and the others free the imprisoned knights and the King, Merlin and Lancelot fight their way to the Cup of Life. With Gaius' help, they manage to empty it of blood and the immortal knights explode. They take Camelot back, but Morgana manages to escape with Morgause. Merlin embeds Excalibur into a rock.
