= Merlin series 4 =

Merlin
- Series 4
- DVD cover
- No. of episodes: 13

Release
- Original network: BBC
- Original release: 1 October – 24 December 2011

Series chronology
- ← Previous; Series 3 Next → Series 5

The fourth series of the British drama series Merlin began on 1 October 2011 with the episode "The Darkest Hour - Part 1". It consists of 13 episodes originally shown on Saturday evenings on BBC One and BBC One HD (repeats shown on BBC Three). The series producer was Sara Hamill, and executive producers were Johnny Capps and Julian Murphy. The directors of the series include Alice Troughton, Alex Pillai, Justin Molotnikov and Jeremy Webb. Writers include Julian Jones (head writer), Howard Overman, Jake Michie, Lucy Watkins, and Richard McBrien.

Series four stars the regular cast from the previous series including Colin Morgan, Angel Coulby, Bradley James, Katie McGrath, and Richard Wilson. Credited as a regular, Anthony Head left the series after his character was killed off in "The Wicked Day". Nathaniel Parker joined the regular cast in this series (credited as such for the first time in "Aithusa") and John Hurt returned as the voice of the Great Dragon. Supporting cast members include Adetomiwa Edun, Eoin Macken, Tom Hopper, and Rupert Young.

Notable guest actors include Santiago Cabrera, Emilia Fox, Gemma Jones, Phil Davis, James Callis, Lindsay Duncan, Gary Lewis, Charlene McKenna, Janet Montgomery, Terence Maynard, Ben Daniels, Miranda Raison and Caroline Faber.

== Plot ==
A year has passed since Morgana betrayed Uther, who has been left heartbroken. Prince Arthur takes charge and later becomes king after his father's death. Agravaine, Arthur's uncle, becomes Arthur's trusted advisor.

With Morgana's powers growing rapidly outside Camelot, Merlin must be more cautious and vigilant to protect Arthur and prevent Camelot's destruction. Merlin, Guinevere, and Gaius assist Arthur as Camelot enters difficult times. It becomes quickly apparent to everyone but Arthur that Agravaine is in league with Morgana and wants her to ascend the throne.

In the two-part finale of the series, Morgana and Agravaine attack Camelot. Morgana takes the throne. Merlin enchants Arthur, who is angry and feels that he has not behaved like a king, to get him to leave Camelot. Agravaine pursues him, but Merlin reveals who he is and kills him. Merlin restores Arthur's faith in himself when he arranges for Arthur to pull Excalibur out of a stone. The night before the attack, Merlin secretly enters Camelot and places an enchanted stick figure under Morgana's bed that drains her of her powers. The attack is successful, Morgana disappears, and Arthur marries Guinevere.

== Cast ==
The full list of cast members is as follows:

=== Main cast ===
- Colin Morgan as Merlin
- Angel Coulby as Gwen
- Bradley James as Arthur
- Katie McGrath as Morgana
- Anthony Head as Uther Pendragon
- Nathaniel Parker as Lord Agravaine
- Richard Wilson as Gaius

=== Recurring ===
- John Hurt as the Great Dragon (voice)
- Rupert Young as Sir Leon
- Eoin Macken as Sir Gwaine
- Adetomiwa Edun as Sir Elyan
- Tom Hopper as Sir Percival
- Michael Cronin as Geoffrey of Monmouth
- Terence Maynard as Helios

=== Guest stars ===
- Emilia Fox as Morgause
- Santiago Cabrera as Sir Lancelot
- Gemma Jones as The Cailleach
- Phil Davis as The Gleeman
- James Callis as Julius Borden
- Charlene McKenna as Lamia
- Janet Montgomery as Princess Mithian
- Lindsay Duncan as Queen Annis
- Steven Hartley as King Caerleon
- Zee Asha as Audrey
- Sarah Beck Mather as Vilia
- Gary Lewis as Alator of the Catha
- Miranda Raison as Isolde
- Ben Daniels as Tristan
- Caroline Faber as Hunith

== Episodes ==
No. overall	No. in series	Title	Directed by	Written by	Original release date	UK viewers (millions)
40	1	"The Darkest Hour - Part 1"	Alice Troughton	Julian Jones	1 October 2011	6.40
It's been one year since Morgana's betrayal. On Samhain, Morgana sacrifices Morgause, with her approval, to summon the mighty Cailleach to tear open the veil between the worlds. Cailleach informs her that Emrys will be her doom. The next day, Arthur, Merlin and the knights investigate the mysterious slaughtering of a whole village, and they're attacked by hellish creatures who kill by touch. Gaius later identifies them as Dorocha. As refugees flow to Camelot, Gaius tells Arthur a blood sacrifice is needed to repair the veil, and Arthur decides to sacrifice himself. Agravaine is shown to be in league with Morgana. Gwen asks Lancelot to protect Arthur. En route to the island of the Blessed, they stay the night at a ruined castle where they're also attacked by Dorocha. Merlin throws himself at them to save Arthur.
41	2	"The Darkest Hour - Part 2"	Alice Troughton	Julian Jones	8 October 2011	6.80
While Lancelot takes Merlin back to Camelot, Arthur and the Knights go to the Island of the Blessed. The Vilia, spirits of rivers, appear to Lancelot and heal Merlin. Afterwards, Lancelot and Merlin race to reach Arthur's group. Gwen confronts Agravaine about his order to close the citadel's doors. Morgana tries to kill Gwen, but Gaius finds her in time. On the way, Merlin calls Kilgharrah to help them. They finally rejoin Arthur and the Knights before reach the Island. Arthur is ready to give up his life, but Merlin uses his magic to prevent it. As Merlin speaks with the Cailleach, Lancelot sacrifices himself to repair the veil. Morgana is furious and wants Agravaine to discover Emrys' identity, but he makes Gaius and Merlin suspicious when he asks Gaius about it. Lancelot's cloak and sword are burned with full honours.
42	3	"The Wicked Day"	Alice Troughton	Howard Overman	15 October 2011	7.04
The mighty citadel is buzzing in anticipation of the prince's birthday celebrations. But Arthur's old adversary, Odin, promises to ensure this is one party Camelot will never forget. For amongst the assembling guests lurks a deadly assassin, set to strike. As the dust settles, Camelot is left devastated when Merlin's attempt to save King Uther is foiled by Morgana's magic. Note: The original script for this episode was published on the BBC website.
43	4	"Aithusa"	Alex Pillai	Julian Jones	22 October 2011	6.96
The mysterious Julius Borden arrives in Camelot with news of a magical secret that threatens to change the landscape of the kingdom forever. He has located the final part of the key to the tomb of Ashkanar, an ancient mausoleum which holds a very special treasure: the last remaining dragon's egg. Merlin is understandably drawn in by Borden's news, and promises to help him. But just who is the enigmatic stranger and, more importantly, why does he really want the egg?
44	5	"His Father's Son"	Alex Pillai	Jake Michie	29 October 2011	7.40
For the first time since his coronation, Arthur finds out what it's really like to be King. He faces his first true test as King when he incurs the wrath of the formidable Queen Annis. With the lives of thousands hanging in the balance, Arthur must find the strength to be his own man and become the leader Camelot so desperately needs.
45	6	"A Servant of Two Masters"	Alex Pillai	Lucy Watkins	5 November 2011	6.94
When Arthur's party is ambushed by Morgana's men, a wounded Merlin allows himself to fall into Morgana's hands to save Arthur. Using ancient magic, she summons a creature called a Fomorroh, and uses it to enslave Merlin's will to make him kill Arthur. Back in Camelot, Merlin tries unsuccessfully to poison and kill an unsuspecting Arthur twice, but his actions make Gwen and Gaius suspicious. Gaius discovers the Fomorroh in Merlin's neck and takes it out, but it grows again. After Gaius makes it sleep, Merlin disguises himself as Dragoon and goes to confront Morgana. After a magical battle, he defeats her and destroys the Fomorroh.
46	7	"The Secret Sharer"	Justin Molotnikov	Julian Jones	12 November 2011	6.72
Morgana joins forces with an enigmatic wizard named Alator to uncover a secret that could change the course of destiny: the identity of Emrys. Meanwhile, Agravaine tries to make Arthur suspect Gaius as the traitor, as Alator kidnaps him to extract Emrys' identity from him. Merlin knows Agravaine is the traitor, but Arthur does not believe him. While Merlin and Gwaine try to find Gaius, Agravaine warns Morgana. Alator manages to extract Merlin's identity from Gaius. When Gwaine finds Agravaine with Gaius, he convinces the knight that he's here to help and they get Gaius back to safety. Convinced by Gaius' words, Alator turns against Morgana, and saves Merlin from her. Agravaine is forced to apologize to Gaius, who afterwards tells Arthur that Dragoon didn't kill Uther.
47	8	"Lamia"	Justin Molotnikov	Jake Michie	19 November 2011	7.00
When the menfolk of Guinevere's home village fall victim to a mysterious illness, Gaius sends Merlin, along with Guinevere and the knights, to cure them, but they are side-tracked by a waif-like girl, Lamia. Only Merlin and Guinevere suspect, rightly, that she is a witch, and soon the knights fall under her spell, succumbing to the same sickness. Arthur rides out with Gaius, who has realized the girl's secret, but will they rescue Merlin and Guinevere or can Merlin defeat Lamia without revealing his magic powers?
48	9	"Lancelot du Lac"	Justin Molotnikov	Lucy Watkins	26 November 2011	7.32
Arthur decides to marry Gwen. Agravaine informs Morgana, who brings back Lancelot's soul under her command. After Gwen agrees to marry him, Arthur celebrates by holding a tournament and Lancelot appears in the middle of it, with a made up story about his return. Merlin is suspicious because Lancelot has forgotten Merlin has magic. Lancelot gives Gwen an enchanted bracelet from Morgana, to revive Gwen's love for him. Merlin discovers Lancelot's a Shadow, invoked by necromancy, working with Agravaine and Morgana, but can't stop him. Agravaine makes sure Arthur sees Gwen kiss Lancelot. After Lancelot and Arthur fight, Agravaine advises Arthur to kill them both. Arthur banishes Gwen and Morgana orders Lancelot to kill himself. Before burning his body, Merlin wakes Lancelot one last time. Lancelot, now himself again, thanks him.
49	10	"A Herald of the New Age"	Jeremy Webb	Howard Overman	3 December 2011	6.90
The Camelot Knights stumble across an eerie Old Religion shrine deep in the forest. Elyan ignores Merlin's warning, and drinks from the well. After returning to Camelot, Elyan starts seeing a drowned child's spirit who finally possesses him, and orders him to kill Arthur. Elyan's attack on Arthur fails but Agravaine pressures Arthur to execute him. Gaius and Merlin find the shrine, which was the place of one of Uther's ruthless slaying of druids. After Arthur realizes Elyan is possessed when he tries to kill him again, Gaius tells him the spirit won't rest in peace until the crime is atoned for. At the shrine, Arthur reveals to Merlin he was the one who led the attack on the druids' camp. Arthur swears to the spirit something like that won't happen again, and the spirit forgives him, leaving Elyan.
50	11	"The Hunter's Heart"	Jeremy Webb	Richard McBrien	10 December 2011	7.12
Morgana finds a powerful ally in the Southron warlord Helios. Together they hatch the perfect plan to force Camelot to its knees... With the Kingdom - and Arthur - preoccupied by the arrival of the beautiful Princess Mithian, it falls to an absent friend to raise the alarm. But with past wounds still raw, can love really conquer all when Guinevere returns? Or is a deadly arrow destined to fly straight into the heart of Camelot?
51	12	"The Sword in the Stone - Part 1"	Alice Troughton	Jake Michie	17 December 2011	8.39
With Morgana at the head of a vast Southron army, a deadly net is closing in around Camelot. When the sorceress strikes, the ferocity of her attack forces everyone to run for their lives - even Arthur. But Morgana won't let him escape that easily. And so begins a chilling hunt. Can Merlin save the King from Morgana's clutches? Or has Arthur's luck finally run out?
52	13	"The Sword in the Stone - Part 2"	Alice Troughton	Julian Jones	24 December 2011	8.18
Helios and Morgana have successfully captured Camelot, while Merlin, Arthur, Gwen, Tristan and Isolde are outlawed and on the run. To prove that Arthur is the rightful heir to the throne, Merlin makes Arthur draw an ancient sword out of a stone. Finding his courage, Arthur strikes Camelot and overthrows Morgana. Arthur takes his crown back and marries Gwen, who finally becomes Queen of Camelot. Wounded and banished, Morgana almost dies, but at the very end, the little dragon Aithusa heals Morgana before flying away.

== Production ==
The production of a fourth series of Merlin was confirmed on 25 October 2010. Anthony Head confirmed that the show would air in September 2011. Series 4 consists of 13 episodes. Colin Morgan said episodes would no longer be as stand-alone, "Each episode takes a progression as a piece of a jigsaw that has to be completed. There's no reverse going on." Due to the popularity of the show, Merlin was renewed for a fifth series.

== Casting ==
Three days before the series finale, Julian Jones the series creator stated that Colin Morgan, Bradley James, Katie McGrath, Angel Coulby, Anthony Head, and Richard Wilson were all contracted for multiple seasons and would return as series regulars. John Hurt who narrated the show and plays the voice of the great dragon, was also upgrade back into a series regular after having a recurring role in season two. On 19 August 2011, Phil Davis was cast as the Gleeman. Nathaniel Parker and Charlene McKenna would also join the casting, playing Agravaine and Lamia respectively. James Callis joined that casting for the fourth episode as Julius Borden. Gemma Jones was cast as Cailleach, the gatekeeper to the spirit world. Lindsay Duncan appears in one episode, playing the Queen of Annis. Steven Hartley also joined the casting as King Caerleon. Series regulars Rupert Young, Tom Hopper and Adetomiwa Edun also return.
