= Merlin series 2 =

Merlin
- Series 2
- DVD cover
- No. of episodes: 13

Release
- Original network: BBC
- Original release: 19 September – 19 December 2009

Series chronology
- ← Previous; Series 1 Next → Series 3

The second series of Merlin, is a British fantasy television series which began on 19 September 2009 and ended on 19 December 2009. Series two regular cast members include Colin Morgan, Bradley James, Katie McGrath, Angel Coulby, Anthony Head, Richard Wilson, and John Hurt as the voice of the Great Dragon. Series two contains thirteen episodes and had 5.77 million viewers for the premiere with 6.64 million viewers for the series finale. Series 2 was the first series to have a two-parter and the only series to have a two-parter mid-series. BBC renewed the show for the third series which premiered on 11 September 2010.

== Plot ==
Merlin continues to serve Prince Arthur while concealing his magical abilities in a kingdom where they are outlawed. New adventures arise in the form of trolls, witchfinders, Druids, the return of an old friend and Dragonlords. While Merlin continues to ensure Arthur grows into the Once and Future King and Arthur and Gwen start to see each other in a new light, a new threat prepares to come to Camelot and a friend will have to make a choice that will alter the legend forever.

== Cast ==
=== Main cast ===
- Colin Morgan as Merlin
- Angel Coulby as Gwen
- Bradley James as Arthur
- Katie McGrath as Morgana
- Anthony Head as Uther Pendragon
- Richard Wilson as Gaius

=== Recurring ===
- John Hurt as the Great Dragon (voice)
- Emilia Fox as Morgause
- Rupert Young as Sir Leon
- Michael Cronin as Geoffrey of Monmouth
- Asa Butterfield as Mordred (Young)

=== Guest stars ===
- Mackenzie Crook as Cedric/Cornelius Sigan
- Adrian Lester as Myror
- Alex Price as "Sir William of Deira"
- Colin Salmon as Aglain
- James Cosmo as Hengist
- Santiago Cabrera as Lancelot
- Sarah Parish as Lady Catrina
- Adam Godley as Jonas
- Charles Dance as Aredian, the witchfinder
- Alice Patten as Ygraine
- Laura Donnelly as Freya
- David Schofield as King Alined
- Georgia Tennant as Lady Vivian
- Mark Lewis Jones as King Olaf
- Kevin Eldon as Trickler
- Joseph Mawle as Alvarr
- Emily Beecham as Enmyria
- John Lynch as Balinor

== Episodes ==
No. overall	No. in series	Title	Directed by	Written by	Original release date	UK viewers (millions)
14	1	"The Curse of Cornelius Sigan"	David Moore	Julian Jones	19 September 2009	5.77
Digging beneath the castle uncovers a tomb full of wealth and the waiting soul of a dead sorcerer. A would-be thief ingratiates himself with Arthur and usurps Merlin's position to get access to the key that will allow him to rob the tomb, but he gets more than he bargained for and is possessed by the dead sorcerer. Merlin is forced to go to the Great Dragon for help to defeat the powerful sorcerer, but the price is a promise of freedom.
15	2	"The Once and Future Queen"	Jeremy Webb	Howard Overman	26 September 2009	5.94
Prince Arthur learns his knights are deliberately letting him win at jousting practice because of his royal status and so believes that he will only be able to prove himself in a jousting tournament if his opponents do not know his real identity. While he goes under cover to compete as an unknown knight, an assassin arrives in Camelot to murder the prince.
16	3	"The Nightmare Begins"	Jeremy Webb	Ben Vanstone	3 October 2009	6.09
Morgana begins to suspect she has magic and Merlin wants to help despite Gaius' warning not to get involved. Merlin helps Morgana to reach out to the Druids, but King Uther declares she has been abducted and sends Arthur with a party of knights to kill the Druids and rescue Morgana.
17	4	"Lancelot and Guinevere"	David Moore	Howard Overman	10 October 2009	5.69
A gang of criminals abduct Morgana and Guinevere intending to force King Uther to ransom his ward. When Morgana escapes, her abductor attempts to pass off Gwen as the king's ward. While imprisoned, Gwen discovers Lancelot working for the kidnappers. As Arthur and Merlin attempt to rescue Guinevere, she and Lancelot also make a bid for freedom.
18	5	"Beauty and the Beast – Part 1"	David Moore	Jake Michie	24 October 2009	5.53
The lone survivor of an attack on a nobleman's household and her odd servant obtain refuge with an old friend, King Uther, but she is not what she appears and Merlin must somehow stop the King from marrying a troll.
19	6	"Beauty and the Beast – Part 2"	Metin Huseyin	Ben Vanstone	31 October 2009	6.14
Even when Merlin successfully unmasks the troll for what she really is, her enchantment continues to hold her new husband, King Uther, in love. It will take Arthur's death to break the spell.
20	7	"The Witchfinder"	Jeremy Webb	Jake Michie	7 November 2009	5.62
A harmless bit of magic by Merlin brings the wrath of Uther's witchfinder down on Camelot. The witchfinder accuses Merlin of being a sorcerer but Gaius takes the fall to protect Merlin. With Gaius due to be burned alive at the stake, Merlin must find out how the witchfinder fabricated the "evidence", expose him and save Gaius.
21	8	"The Sins of the Father"	Metin Huseyin	Howard Overman	14 November 2009	6.16
Arthur faces a challenge from a mysterious knight who turns out to be a woman. He is forced to face Morgause in a battle to the death. She defeats him but spares his life in exchange for a promise to meet her and further tempts him with the knowledge that she knew his mother. What Arthur discovers when Morgause uses her sorcery to allow him to speak with his dead mother sends Arthur back to Camelot intent on killing his father.
22	9	"The Lady of the Lake"	Metin Huseyin	Julian Jones	21 November 2009	6.30
Merlin rescues a young "cursed" Druid girl and hides her. He begins to fall in love with her. At the same time, mysterious murders start to occur in Camelot.
23	10	"Sweet Dreams"	Alice Troughton	Lucy Watkins	28 November 2009	6.02
Five kings gather in Camelot to sign a peace treaty, but one of them intends to sabotage the peace. King Alined's jester uses magic to enchant Prince Arthur to fall in love with the beautiful Lady Vivian to incite a war between her possessive father, King Olaf, and Camelot. After finding them in a compromising situation, Olaf challenges Arthur to a duel. Merlin finds that the spell's cure is a true love's kiss, and must convince Gwen to kiss Arthur.
24	11	"The Witch's Quickening"	Alice Troughton	Jake Michie	5 December 2009	6.01
An unscrupulous rebel, Alvar, uses Mordred to contact Morgana and convince her to steal a valuable crystal which he believes will aid in his quest to overthrow Uther. Arthur is able to retrieve the crystal but not before Merlin has been tempted to use it and sees a vision of the future which terrifies him. After Uther condemns Alvar to death, Morgana disowns him and helps Alvar escape.
25	12	"The Fires of Idirsholas"	Jeremy Webb	Julian Jones	12 December 2009	6.01
Morgause uses her magic to re-awaken seven undead knights to attack Camelot. She seduces Morgana into being the source of a spell which puts everyone in Camelot to sleep and leaves the city vulnerable. When Merlin and Arthur return to the city to warn that the undead knights are awake, they are helpless to break the spell and begin to succumb to sleep themselves. After Merlin promises on his mother's life to free him, the Great Dragon advises Merlin to kill Morgana to stop the spell. Cornered into a desperate situation, Merlin is forced to poison Morgana, coercing Morgause to lift the spell in order to save her. Morgause takes Morgana away with her. Merlin fulfills his promise and frees the Great Dragon.
26	13	"The Last Dragonlord"	Jeremy Webb	Julian Jones	19 December 2009	6.64
Merlin's promise unleashes the Great Dragon's revenge on Camelot. When Merlin's magic proves ineffective, the only hope is to contact the last living Dragonlord. But as Arthur and Merlin set out on their quest, Merlin's mind is full of the shocking revelation Gaius has told him.
