= Merlin series 5 =

Merlin
- Series 5
- DVD cover
- No. of episodes: 13

Release
- Original network: BBC
- Original release: 6 October – 24 December 2012

Series chronology
- ← Previous; Series 4

The fifth and final series of the British fantasy drama series Merlin began broadcasting on 6 October 2012 with the episode "Arthur's Bane – Part 1" and ended on 24 December 2012 in the UK, with "The Diamond of the Day – Part 2". It consists of 13 episodes shown on Saturday evenings on BBC One and BBC One HD (repeats shown on BBC Three). Series producer is Sara Hamill and executive producers are Johnny Capps and Julian Murphy. Directors include Justin Molotnikov, Ashley Way, Alice Troughton and Declan O'Dwyer. Writers include Julian Jones (head writer), Howard Overman, Jake Michie and Richard McBrien.

Series five stars the regular cast from the previous series including Colin Morgan, Angel Coulby, Bradley James, Katie McGrath, and Richard Wilson. Anthony Head returns to the cast in a one episode guest appearance. Alexander Vlahos became part of the regular cast in this series and John Hurt returned as the voice of the Dragon. Supporting cast members include Adetomiwa Edun, Eoin Macken, Tom Hopper, and Rupert Young. It was announced on 26 November 2012 that Merlin would end with the fifth series. The two-part finale was broadcast on 22 and 24 December 2012.

== Plot ==
After three years of peace and harmony, Camelot's future could not appear brighter. But as Merlin helps King Arthur to bring the kingdom into a Golden Age, the seeds of Camelot's destruction are being sown as the sorceress Morgana Pendragon resumes plotting Arthur's downfall.

When an old face returns to the castle and gains a position amongst the king's inner circle, Merlin must be on guard more than ever. For the new arrival is the sorcerer Mordred, the Druid boy whose destiny it is to end the King's life and bring chaos to Camelot; after all, Merlin has been warned in the past that Mordred is destined to unite with the evil Morgana in a deadly alliance which will destroy Camelot. With the death song of King Uther haunting the castle, Morgana's powers greater and more dangerous than ever, and Guinevere crossing over to the dark side, both Merlin and Arthur find that their destinies are approaching. The battle for Camelot is headed for a deadly conclusion, and nothing will ever be the same again.

== Cast ==
=== Main cast ===
- Colin Morgan as Merlin
- Angel Coulby as Guinevere
- Bradley James as Arthur Pendragon
- Katie McGrath as Morgana Pendragon
- Richard Wilson as Gaius

=== Recurring ===
- John Hurt as the Great Dragon (voice)
- Rupert Young as Sir Leon
- Eoin Macken as Sir Gwaine
- Adetomiwa Edun as Sir Elyan
- Tom Hopper as Sir Percival
- Alexander Vlahos as Mordred

=== Guest star ===
- Stephen McCole as Ragnor
- Matthew Prowse as Saxon
- Liam Cunningham as Ruadan
- James Fox as King Rodor
- Alfie Stewart as Daegal
- John Bradley West as Tyr Seward
- Julian Glover as Lochru
- Anthony Head as Uther Pendragon
- Erin Richards as Eira
- Tony Guilfoyle as Sindri
- Peter Guinness as Ari
- Kelly Wenham as Queen Mab
- Jane Thorne as Valdis
- Sophie Rundle as Sefa
- Josette Simon as The Euchdag
- Barry Aird as Beroun
- Frances Tomelty as Disir
- Alexandra Dowling as Kara
- Gordon Munro as Alrick
- John Shrapnel as King Sarrum

== Episodes ==
No. overall	No. in series	Title	Directed by	Written by	Original release date	UK viewers (millions)
53	1	"Arthur's Bane – Part 1"	Justin Molotnikov	Julian Jones	6 October 2012	7.12
Camelot is three years into her Golden Age, but already the seeds of her destruction are being sown. After news that Sir Gwaine and a battalion of Camelot's finest were lost in a patrol in the northern lands of Ismere, Camelot's round table comes to the conclusion that Morgana is behind this. Arthur sets off on a perilous journey with Merlin and a handful of knights to rescue the men. On the way, Merlin is shown a frightening vision of Arthur's death. Meanwhile, behind the walls of Camelot, Queen Guinevere must seek out a traitor who has put everyone's lives at stake.
54	2	"Arthur's Bane – Part 2"	Justin Molotnikov	Julian Jones	13 October 2012	6.99
Merlin is troubled by Mordred's reappearance, despite the kindness the latter shows to both Merlin and Arthur. After escaping from the Saxons, Merlin and Arthur continue their journey to Morgana's tower in Ismere, while Mordred travels with the Saxons on the same path. In the tower, Arthur and Merlin disguise themselves as Saxons, but Arthur is intercepted by Morgana. Merlin attempts to save him but is incapacitated. Mordred ultimately saves Arthur in an unexpected turn of events. He is then knighted in Camelot, but Merlin is still wary of him.
55	3	"The Death Song of Uther Pendragon"	Justin Molotnikov	Howard Overman	20 October 2012	6.86
When given the chance to see his father one last time, Arthur takes it. Little does he know, however, that Uther is one step ahead of him, and his actions have devastating consequences. With Uther's spirit on the rampage in Camelot, Merlin knows that they must work fast to eradicate the ghost of the old king. Thus, Arthur must hunt down his father and prove to him, once and for all, that he is now truly King.
56	4	"Another's Sorrow"	Ashley Way	Jake Michie	27 October 2012	6.86
When Princess Mithian of Nemeth, a long-standing ally of Camelot, comes to Arthur seeking aid as her father has been captured by the long-time enemy of Camelot, Odin, he is quick to grant it. But Merlin fears there is something sinister at play, particularly due to the odd behavior of Mithian's nurse, Hilda. Unable to persuade the king of his suspicions, Merlin joins Arthur, Gaius, Mithian, Hilda, and a handful of knights on a journey to rescue Mithian's father, Rodor.
57	5	"The Disir"	Ashley Way	Richard McBrien	3 November 2012	6.88
The Disir summon King Arthur to receive the judgement of the Triple Goddess and Arthur decides to respond. All does not go as planned, and the King and his knights' recklessness leave Mordred gravely wounded. Desperate, Arthur decides to petition the Disir for help, and he and Merlin seek them out again. The Disir give Arthur an ultimatum: embrace magic, or the Triple Goddess will seal his fate against him. Merlin seizes what he sees as the opportunity to kill Mordred and reminds Arthur that there is no place for magic in Camelot. The Disir seal Arthur's fate and when he returns, Mordred is well again. Merlin realises only then what happened; in not embracing magic, Arthur sealed his fate; Mordred lives.
58	6	"The Dark Tower"	Ashley Way	Julian Jones	10 November 2012	6.85
Gwen and Elyan are on a pilgrimage to their father's grave. However, on the journey back, Gwen is captured by Morgana. At the news, Arthur and his knights ride out on a rescue mission. Morgana begins a slow process of torturing Gwen using mandrake root. Arthur and the others arrive at the Dark Tower, where Gwen is kept, and Elyan surges ahead, finding his sister trapped by a magically protective sword. He fights with the sword until he dies in Gwen's arms. Arthur brings Gwen back to Camelot where Elyan's funeral is held. However, at night, Gwen sneaks to a meeting with Morgana as they begin their conspiracy against Camelot.
59	7	"A Lesson in Vengeance"	Alice Troughton	Jake Michie	17 November 2012	6.86
Strange events are occurring in Camelot, and all of them seem to bring harm to the King. Tyr, a stable-hand, gets caught in the cross-fire and Morgana fears that he will reveal the secret of Guinevere being a traitor. Merlin becomes suspicious of Gwen, quickly realising that Morgana must have done something to her. Tyr is found dead before he can report any news, and the attempts to kill Arthur continue. Finally, Gwen manages to poison Arthur, forcing Merlin to use his magic to save the King.
60	8	"The Hollow Queen"	Alice Troughton	Julian Jones	24 November 2012	6.86
When Daegal, a Druid boy, asks for Merlin's aid in helping his sick sister, Merlin agrees and begins the journey to the Valley of the Fallen Kings. This turns out to be a trap for Merlin set by Morgana, who poisons Merlin. Daegal reconsiders, and saves Merlin. In the meantime, Arthur is entertaining the fearsome Lord Sarrum with peace treaties. Guinevere plots Arthur's assassination with the visiting warlord. Morgana and Gwen plan to double cross Sarrum, but Sarrum plans to do the same. On the day of the treaty signing, Sarrum positions an assassin to kill Arthur. Merlin and Daegal arrive just in time to save Arthur and kill Sarrum, but Daegal dies in the process. Merlin and Gaius bury Daegal, and Merlin knows that something must be done about Gwen.
61	9	"With All My Heart"	Alice Troughton	Richard McBrien	1 December 2012	6.76
Merlin reveals Guinevere's betrayal to Arthur. Merlin resolves to bring the old Gwen back and Gaius suggests that he travel to the Dochraid. Under threat, the Dochraid explains that Gwen must enter a magic lake willingly to be cleansed by the White Goddess. Arthur, Merlin and Mordred take the unconscious Gwen to the lake where Merlin takes on the guise of Dolma, a female sorceress, to perform the ceremony. Arthur must use Gwen's love for him to convince her to enter the lake. Merlin, still in disguise, asks Arthur not to forget that magic saved his Queen. Mordred confronts Merlin on the way back knowing that the magic that saved Gwen was his.
62	10	"The Kindness of Strangers"	Declan O'Dwyer	Richard McBrien	8 December 2012	7.00
Morgana is determined to discover Emrys' identity. She captures Alator, who possesses this knowledge, but he refuses to reveal it. Meanwhile, a mysterious woman tells Merlin to meet her in the woods. Merlin goes, and finds she is a follower of Alator, named Finna. They are attacked by knights from Camelot, and Finna flees. Morgana finds a note sent from Finna to Alator and begins searching for her. Merlin reaches her first and they talk, before being attacked by Morgana's men. Merlin is wounded, but they manage to escape and Finna delivers Arthur's destiny to Merlin. She takes Merlin's sword and tells him to flee. Morgana arrives and confronts Finna, asking for Emrys' identity, but Finna commits suicide with Merlin's sword. It is Morgana's fury of failing to find out Emrys' true identity which leads her to declare war on Camelot.
63	11	"The Drawing of the Dark"	Declan O'Dwyer	Julian Jones	15 December 2012	7.34
Kara, a Druid girl and Mordred's love, is involved in a Saxon attack on a Camelot supply wagon. Mordred lets her escape from the Knights of Camelot and treats her injuries. Kara is discovered by Arthur and arrested after attempting to kill him. She is sentenced to hang. Mordred makes an unsuccessful attempt to flee with Kara, and they are both jailed. Arthur gives Kara the chance to repent. She refuses, and her sentence is carried out. Mordred breaks his cell open in a magical rage as Kara is hanged. He seeks Morgana, joins her forces and reveals Emrys' identity.
64	12	"The Diamond of the Day – Part 1"	Justin Molotnikov	Jake Michie	22 December 2012	8.45
Using dark magic, Morgana strips Merlin of his magic. She and Mordred, with their Saxon army, attack a nearby garrison. Arthur decides to meet her forces at Camlann to prevent her from reaching Camelot. Morgana forges a sword for Mordred in Aithusa's breath, confident that nothing can survive its touch. Merlin goes to the Crystal Cave to get back his powers; however, Morgana finds out about his plans through her use of a spy. Morgana and Merlin come face to face in the cave and she traps Merlin in the cave. At Camlann, Arthur's and Morgana's armies begin to battle. Morgana watches from a cliff as Arthur and his men fight against the Saxons and Mordred kills knights with his new sword. At the Crystal Cave, with the help of his father Balinor, Merlin regains his magic, and as Emrys, makes his way out of the cave and rides for Camlann.
65	13	"The Diamond of the Day – Part 2"	Justin Molotnikov	Julian Jones	24 December 2012	7.80
Emrys arrives at Camlann and uses his magic to knock Morgana unconscious, order Aithusa to leave, and strike down many of Morgana's men. At the end of the battle, Mordred stabs Arthur with his sword, after which Arthur kills Mordred. While tending Arthur, Merlin tells him that he was the sorcerer in the battle. Arthur's only chance of survival is the powers of the Sidhe at the Lake of Avalon, so Merlin sets out to reach the lake. In Camelot, Morgana's spy is unmasked and she is hanged, leading Gwaine and Percival to hunt down Morgana. However, she overpowers them and magically tortures Gwaine into confessing Arthur's whereabouts; Gwaine dies shortly afterwards in Percival's arms. Morgana catches up with Merlin and Arthur and drives their horses away, but she is killed by Merlin wielding Excalibur. Without horses, Merlin cannot get Arthur to the lake in time, and Arthur dies in Merlin's arms after thanking him for everything he has done. Merlin calls upon the Great Dragon to carry Arthur's body to the lake, still hoping that Arthur can be healed. The Dragon tells Merlin it is not possible but that as the Once and Future King, Arthur will rise again in Albion's hour of need. After the Dragon leaves, Merlin throws Excalibur into the lake, prepares Arthur's body in a boat, and launches the boat into the lake. Guinevere ascends the throne of Camelot. In the present day, Merlin walks past the Lake of Avalon, still waiting for his king to rise again, briefly turning his head to look at it.
