= List of Merlin episodes =

Merlin is a British fantasy-adventure television programme created by Julian Jones, Jake Michie, Julian Murphy, and Johnny Capps, starring Colin Morgan in the title role. It was broadcast on BBC One from 20 September 2008 to 24 December 2012. The show is loosely based on the Arthurian legends of the young wizard Merlin and his relationship with King Arthur, but it differs from traditional versions. The show was influenced by the US drama series Smallville about the early years of Superman, and was produced by independent production company Shine Limited.

The series was broadcast on BBC One from 20 September 2008 to 24 December 2012. During the course of the programme, 65 episodes of Merlin aired over five series. The five series are available on DVD in the UK, the US and in Canada.

== Series overview ==
Series	Episodes	Originally released		Ave. UK viewers (millions)
Series	Episodes	First released	Last released	Ave. UK viewers (millions)
1	13	20 September 2008	13 December 2008	6.32
2	13	19 September 2009	19 December 2009	5.99
3	13	11 September 2010	4 December 2010	6.78
4	13	1 October 2011	24 December 2011	7.17
5	13	6 October 2012	24 December 2012	7.13

== Episodes ==
=== Series 1 (2008) ===
No. overall	No. in series	Title	Directed by	Written by	Original release date	UK viewers (millions)
1	1	"The Dragon's Call"	James Hawes	Julian Jones	20 September 2008	7.15
2	2	"Valiant"	James Hawes	Howard Overman	27 September 2008	5.40
3	3	"The Mark of Nimueh"	James Hawes	Julian Jones	4 October 2008	6.30
4	4	"The Poisoned Chalice"	Ed Fraiman	Ben Vanstone	11 October 2008	6.48
5	5	"Lancelot"	Ed Fraiman	Jake Michie	18 October 2008	5.37
6	6	"A Remedy to Cure All Ills"	Ed Fraiman	Julian Jones	25 October 2008	6.00
7	7	"The Gates of Avalon"	Jeremy Webb	Ben Vanstone	1 November 2008	6.45
8	8	"The Beginning of the End"	Jeremy Webb	Howard Overman	8 November 2008	6.25
9	9	"Excalibur"	Jeremy Webb	Julian Jones	15 November 2008	6.47
10	10	"The Moment of Truth"	David Moore	Ben Vanstone	22 November 2008	7.03
11	11	"The Labyrinth of Gedref"	Stuart Orme	Howard Overman	29 November 2008	6.71
12	12	"To Kill the King"	Stuart Orme	Jake Michie	6 December 2008	6.31
13	13	"Le Morte d'Arthur"	David Moore	Julian Jones	13 December 2008	6.27

=== Series 2 (2009) ===
No. overall	No. in series	Title	Directed by	Written by	Original release date	UK viewers (millions)
14	1	"The Curse of Cornelius Sigan"	David Moore	Julian Jones	19 September 2009	5.77
15	2	"The Once and Future Queen"	Jeremy Webb	Howard Overman	26 September 2009	5.94
16	3	"The Nightmare Begins"	Jeremy Webb	Ben Vanstone	3 October 2009	6.09
17	4	"Lancelot and Guinevere"	David Moore	Howard Overman	10 October 2009	5.69
18	5	"Beauty and the Beast – Part 1"	David Moore	Jake Michie	24 October 2009	5.53
19	6	"Beauty and the Beast – Part 2"	Metin Huseyin	Ben Vanstone	31 October 2009	6.14
20	7	"The Witchfinder"	Jeremy Webb	Jake Michie	7 November 2009	5.62
21	8	"The Sins of the Father"	Metin Huseyin	Howard Overman	14 November 2009	6.16
22	9	"The Lady of the Lake"	Metin Huseyin	Julian Jones	21 November 2009	6.30
23	10	"Sweet Dreams"	Alice Troughton	Lucy Watkins	28 November 2009	6.02
24	11	"The Witch's Quickening"	Alice Troughton	Jake Michie	5 December 2009	6.01
25	12	"The Fires of Idirsholas"	Jeremy Webb	Julian Jones	12 December 2009	6.01
26	13	"The Last Dragonlord"	Jeremy Webb	Julian Jones	19 December 2009	6.64

=== Series 3 (2010) ===
No. overall	No. in series	Title	Directed by	Written by	Original release date	UK viewers (millions)
27	1	"The Tears of Uther Pendragon – Part 1"	Jeremy Webb	Julian Jones	11 September 2010	6.49
28	2	"The Tears of Uther Pendragon – Part 2"	Jeremy Webb	Julian Jones	18 September 2010	6.06
29	3	"Goblin's Gold"	Jeremy Webb	Howard Overman	25 September 2010	6.22
30	4	"Gwaine"	David Moore	Julian Jones	2 October 2010	6.42
31	5	"The Crystal Cave"	Alice Troughton	Julian Jones	9 October 2010	6.36
32	6	"The Changeling"	David Moore	Lucy Watkins	16 October 2010	6.40
33	7	"The Castle of Fyrien"	David Moore	Jake Michie	23 October 2010	6.82
34	8	"The Eye of the Phoenix"	Alice Troughton	Julian Jones	30 October 2010	6.92
35	9	"Love in the Time of Dragons"	Alice Troughton	Jake Michie	6 November 2010	6.90
36	10	"Queen of Hearts"	Ashley Way	Howard Overman	13 November 2010	7.37
37	11	"The Sorcerer's Shadow"	Ashley Way	Julian Jones	20 November 2010	7.42
38	12	"The Coming of Arthur – Part 1"	Jeremy Webb	Jake Michie	27 November 2010	7.12
39	13	"The Coming of Arthur – Part 2"	Jeremy Webb	Julian Jones	4 December 2010	7.67

=== Series 4 (2011) ===
No. overall	No. in series	Title	Directed by	Written by	Original release date	UK viewers (millions)
40	1	"The Darkest Hour - Part 1"	Alice Troughton	Julian Jones	1 October 2011	6.40
41	2	"The Darkest Hour - Part 2"	Alice Troughton	Julian Jones	8 October 2011	6.80
42	3	"The Wicked Day"	Alice Troughton	Howard Overman	15 October 2011	7.04
43	4	"Aithusa"	Alex Pillai	Julian Jones	22 October 2011	6.96
44	5	"His Father's Son"	Alex Pillai	Jake Michie	29 October 2011	7.40
45	6	"A Servant of Two Masters"	Alex Pillai	Lucy Watkins	5 November 2011	6.94
46	7	"The Secret Sharer"	Justin Molotnikov	Julian Jones	12 November 2011	6.72
47	8	"Lamia"	Justin Molotnikov	Jake Michie	19 November 2011	7.00
48	9	"Lancelot du Lac"	Justin Molotnikov	Lucy Watkins	26 November 2011	7.32
49	10	"A Herald of the New Age"	Jeremy Webb	Howard Overman	3 December 2011	6.90
50	11	"The Hunter's Heart"	Jeremy Webb	Richard McBrien	10 December 2011	7.12
51	12	"The Sword in the Stone - Part 1"	Alice Troughton	Jake Michie	17 December 2011	8.39
52	13	"The Sword in the Stone - Part 2"	Alice Troughton	Julian Jones	24 December 2011	8.18

=== Series 5 (2012) ===
No. overall	No. in series	Title	Directed by	Written by	Original release date	UK viewers (millions)
53	1	"Arthur's Bane – Part 1"	Justin Molotnikov	Julian Jones	6 October 2012	7.12
54	2	"Arthur's Bane – Part 2"	Justin Molotnikov	Julian Jones	13 October 2012	6.99
55	3	"The Death Song of Uther Pendragon"	Justin Molotnikov	Howard Overman	20 October 2012	6.86
56	4	"Another's Sorrow"	Ashley Way	Jake Michie	27 October 2012	6.86
57	5	"The Disir"	Ashley Way	Richard McBrien	3 November 2012	6.88
58	6	"The Dark Tower"	Ashley Way	Julian Jones	10 November 2012	6.85
59	7	"A Lesson in Vengeance"	Alice Troughton	Jake Michie	17 November 2012	6.86
60	8	"The Hollow Queen"	Alice Troughton	Julian Jones	24 November 2012	6.86
61	9	"With All My Heart"	Alice Troughton	Richard McBrien	1 December 2012	6.76
62	10	"The Kindness of Strangers"	Declan O'Dwyer	Richard McBrien	8 December 2012	7.00
63	11	"The Drawing of the Dark"	Declan O'Dwyer	Julian Jones	15 December 2012	7.34
64	12	"The Diamond of the Day – Part 1"	Justin Molotnikov	Jake Michie	22 December 2012	8.45
65	13	"The Diamond of the Day – Part 2"	Justin Molotnikov	Julian Jones	24 December 2012	7.80

== Specials ==
=== Children in Need ===
No.	Title	Original release date	UK viewers (millions)
1	"Merlin in Need 2008"	14 November 2008	9.83
The kingdom raises money for the great creature Pudsey by throwing rotten vegetables at Merlin. A two-minute sketch for the BBC's "Children in Need" appeal.
2	"Merlin in Need 2009"	20 November 2009	10.08
An apparent sorcerer is on the loose, turning everything modern in Camelot. A two-minute sketch for "Children in Need".
3	"Merlin in Need 2010"	19 November 2010	12.94
The cast of Merlin gives a quick summary asking to donate money to Children in Need with some bloopers.

=== BBC Wales Exclusive Documentary ===
No.	Title	Directed by	Original release date
1	"The Real Merlin and Arthur"	Mark Procter	28 November 2009
Stars of the hit drama series Merlin, Colin Morgan and Bradley James, set off across Wales to explore the country's centuries-old connections to the legend of King Arthur and his wizard Merlin. Along the way they encounter enthusiasts and experts in Arthurian lore, and visit some of the most breathtaking landscapes in Wales.

=== Secrets and Magic ===
A documentary series created by the BBC called Secrets and Magic was produced to accompany episodes of the second series. In a similar fashion to Doctor Who Confidential, the series looks at the production of each episode of the drama, featuring interviews with cast and crew as well as on-set footage. Shown on BBC Three.

No.	Title	Original release date	Prod code
0	"Welcome to Camelot"	19 September 2009	1.X
1	"Merlin Time"	20 September 2009	1.1
2	"Fit For a King"	2 October 2009	1.2
3	"Casting the Magic"	9 October 2009	1.3
4	"Maid to be Queen"	12 October 2009	1.4
5	"Trolly Dolly"	24 October 2009	1.5
6	"Con-troll Freak"	2 November 2009	1.6
7	"Witch Hunt"	9 November 2009	1.7
8	"A Family Affair"	16 November 2009	1.8
9	"Hardwork and Heartbreak"	22 November 2009	1.9
10	"Love Fool"	28 November 2009	1.10
11	"Beauty & the Thief"	6 December 2009	1.11
12	"The Dragon's Den"	13 December 2009	1.12
13	"That's a Wrap"	21 December 2009	1.13

=== Colin & Bradley's Merlin Quest ===
Although Merlin Secrets and Magic was not recommissioned for a second series, Colin & Bradley's Merlin Quest was produced to accompany Series 3 of Merlin. Colin Morgan and Bradley James, who play Merlin and Arthur in Merlin, appear in a weekly series of short (usually 2 to 4 minutes) online videos posted on the official site of Merlin. In each episode the actors have to complete various challenges and tasks, including questions and games with Merlin bloopers shown regularly. Colin & Bradley's Merlin Quest was produced by Ian Smith with Luke Baker as assistant producer.

== Ratings ==
Merlin : UK viewers per episode (millions)

Series	Episode number													Average
Series	1	2	3	4	5	6	7	8	9	10	11	12	13	Average
1	7.15	5.40	6.30	6.48	5.37	6.00	6.45	6.25	6.47	7.03	6.71	6.31	6.27	6.32
2	5.77	5.94	6.09	5.69	5.53	6.14	5.62	6.16	6.30	6.02	6.01	6.01	6.64	5.99
3	6.49	6.06	6.22	6.42	6.36	6.40	6.82	6.92	6.90	7.37	7.42	7.12	7.67	6.78
4	6.40	6.80	7.04	6.96	7.40	6.94	6.72	7.00	7.32	6.90	7.12	8.39	8.18	7.17
5	7.12	6.99	6.86	6.86	6.88	6.85	6.86	6.86	6.76	7.00	7.34	8.45	7.80	7.13

Audience measurement performed by Broadcasters' Audience Research BoardBARB
