= Merlin series 1 =

Merlin
- Series 1
- DVD cover
- No. of episodes: 13

Release
- Original network: BBC
- Original release: 20 September – 13 December 2008

Series chronology
- Next → Series 2

The first series of Merlin, a British fantasy television series, began on 20 September 2008 and ended on 13 December 2008. Regular cast members for the first series include Colin Morgan, Bradley James, Katie McGrath, Angel Coulby, Anthony Head, Richard Wilson, and John Hurt as the voice of the Great Dragon. The first series contained thirteen episodes, with 7.15 million tuning into the premier and 6.27 for the series finale. It was the only series to be composed completely of stand-alone episodes. Before the series finale, the BBC confirmed that the series was renewed for a further 13 episode second series. Series 2 premiered on 19 September 2009.

== Plot ==
Merlin and Arthur must work together to protect the great kingdom of Camelot against dark sorcery. But Merlin faces a tough challenge in hiding his dark secret from his best friends. Because the only way to fight magic... is with magic.

== Cast ==
=== Main cast ===
- Colin Morgan as Merlin
- Angel Coulby as Gwen
- Bradley James as Arthur
- Katie McGrath as Morgana
- Anthony Head as Uther Pendragon
- Richard Wilson as Gaius

=== Recurring ===
- John Hurt as the Great Dragon (voice)
- Michelle Ryan as Nimueh
- Michael Cronin as Geoffrey of Monmouth
- David Durham as Tom
- Caroline Faber as Hunith

=== Guest stars ===
- Eve Myles as Lady Helen/Mary Collins
- Will Mellor as Valiant
- Julian Rhind-Tutt as Edwin
- Clive Russell as Bayard
- Santiago Cabrera as Lancelot
- Kenneth Cranham as Aulfric
- Holliday Grainger as Sophia
- Asa Butterfield as Mordred
- Alexander Siddig as Kanen
- Joe Dempsie as Will
- Frank Finlay as Anhora
- Cal MacAninch as Tauren
- Ed Coleman as Morris

== Episodes ==
No. overall	No. in series	Title	Directed by	Written by	Original release date	UK viewers (millions)
1	1	"The Dragon's Call"	James Hawes	Julian Jones	20 September 2008	7.15
The teenaged warlock Merlin is sent to the bustling kingdom of Camelot by his mother, to work as an apprentice under the tutorage of Gaius, the court physician. On his arrival, he witnesses the execution of a man accused of sorcery as the tyrannical King, Uther Pendragon, has forbidden sorcery on pain of death. The executed man's mother, a sorceress, vows revenge on Uther and promises to kill Uther's only son, Prince Arthur. That night, Merlin hears a mysterious voice calling him and he discovers Kilgharrah, a great and powerful Dragon, bound and shackled down in the dungeons by Uther. Kilgharrah tells Merlin he and Arthur share a destiny and Merlin must protect Arthur until the young Prince becomes King and unites the land of Albion, restoring magic. Upon meeting each other, Merlin and Arthur instantly clash, with Arthur's arrogance annoying Merlin. However, after the old sorceress attempts to assassinate Arthur and Merlin saves him, a grateful Uther appoints Merlin as Arthur's personal servant.
2	2	"Valiant"	James Hawes	Howard Overman	27 September 2008	5.40
Uther holds an annual tournament for the knights, in which Arthur is the defending champion. Sir Valiant has a magic secret weapon: a shield from which poisonous serpents can come to life and attack. Merlin finds out and tells Arthur, who accuses Valiant of cheating, but the only 'worthy' witness has died and a servant's word is useless against a knight. Humiliated, Arthur fires Merlin and prepares for his own match with Valiant, expecting to die but hoping to prove he was right. After encouragement from Kilgharrah, Merlin decides against giving up on Arthur and saves him, earning the Prince's trust again.
3	3	"The Mark of Nimueh"	James Hawes	Julian Jones	4 October 2008	6.30
The dark sorceress Nimueh casts a spell on a dragon egg which she throws into the castle's water supply. The next day, people start dying of a plague which turns their skin white with dark blue veins. Uther believes it to be the work of magic and orders Arthur to search Camelot for the sorcerer. When Gwen's father exhibits symptoms, Gaius warns Merlin a sudden recovery will arouse suspicion, but Merlin cures him with magic anyway. However, when Arthur reports the remarkable recovery, Uther believes Gwen to be the sorceress and sentences her to death. With some prompting from Morgana, Arthur and Merlin set out to defeat the monster and save Gwen.
4	4	"The Poisoned Chalice"	Ed Fraiman	Ben Vanstone	11 October 2008	6.48
While Camelot prepares to celebrate peace with Mercia's visiting ruler King Bayard, a priestess named Nimueh forges a poisoned chalice and replaces it with one due to be given to Arthur. She then disguises herself and plants suspicion in Merlin's mind about Bayard's true intentions. After Merlin accuses Bayard of trying to poison the Prince, Uther forces Merlin to prove his word by drinking from the goblet, not caring if he dies. Despite Arthur's protest, Merlin drinks from the goblet and is poisoned, collapsing. Bayard is framed and imprisoned, whilst Gaius deduces the only antidote is from an incredibly rare flower, which only grows in certain caves. Uther sternly forbids Arthur from undergoing the perilous journey, especially for a 'disposable' servant like Merlin. Despite his father, Arthur bravely rides out to find the flower and, even though Nimueh deliberately leads him into the paths of deadly monsters, he succeeds and brings the flower back to Camelot. Upon his arrival, a furious Uther locks his son in the dungeons as punishment for his disobedience and cruelly crushes the flower but, with the help of maidservant Gwen, Merlin receives the antidote and is cured.
5	5	"Lancelot"	Ed Fraiman	Jake Michie	18 October 2008	5.37
Merlin is saved by Lancelot, a kindhearted and loyal warrior after being attacked by a griffin. Learning Lancelot's dream is to become a knight and grateful for his rescue, Merlin brings him to court and magically forges proof of nobility so that he can apply. Lancelot's skills means he passes hazing and close combat tests against Arthur, but Uther discovers he is not noble-born and Lancelot is jailed. When the griffin attacks Camelot, the knights are unable to kill the monster. Arthur frees Lancelot and Merlin helps Lancelot triumph against the griffin, revealing his magic for the first time. To his surprise, Lancelot accepts him and promises to keep it secret, forging a powerful bond between the pair. However, Uther disagrees with Arthur over allowing the poor-born Lancelot to become a Knight, so Lancelot leaves Camelot.
6	6	"A Remedy to Cure All Ills"	Ed Fraiman	Julian Jones	25 October 2008	6.00
Morgana falls ill with an unidentified brain disease which Gaius is unable to cure. A mysterious healer, Edwin, proves that his 'remedy to cure all ills' seemingly helps her, but actually removes the cursed black beetle that caused the illness. Uther retires Gaius and instates Edwin as the new court physician. Gaius secretly gets court archivist Geoffrey to give him access to the sealed records of Uther's purge of magic, proving Edwin's parents were executed as sorcerers. Edwin threatens to expose Merlin if Gaius tells Uther, leaving Gaius with an impossible choice. After consulting with the Great Dragon, Gaius decides to step down and leave Camelot (calling Merlin the 'son he never had'). Edwin uses another beetle to condemn Uther to an agonizing death. Gaius returns at the last minute, but it takes Merlin to save the day.
7	7	"The Gates of Avalon"	Jeremy Webb	Ben Vanstone	1 November 2008	6.45
Arthur rescues the elderly Aulfric and his pretty daughter Sophia from bandits and they are welcomed to Camelot. Arthur quickly falls in love with Sophia and they plan to elope. Morgana is very alarmed as she has a recurring dream in which Sophia drowns Arthur. She confides in Gaius and Merlin, who realize that the dreams are prophetic and that Morgana may have magic. Merlin follows Aulfric to a lake, where he discovers that father and daughter are Sidhes, former immortals who have lost their immortality and who must kill Arthur in order to regain it.
8	8	"The Beginning of the End"	Jeremy Webb	Howard Overman	8 November 2008	6.25
When a druid is caught by the king's guards, his son sends out a telepathic call for help. Merlin responds and hides the boy, Mordred, in Morgana's chambers. Morgana forms a close bond with Mordred and risks her life attempting to smuggle him out of Camelot. When this fails, Arthur joins in the plot to help Mordred escape. Merlin must decide whether or not to help when the Great Dragon hints at dark prophecies about Mordred.
9	9	"Excalibur"	Jeremy Webb	Julian Jones	15 November 2008	6.47
The Black Knight arrives to interrupt Arthur's coming-of-age celebrations and throws down the gauntlet to any knight who will fight him. He kills them all one by one. Gaius discovers that he is Uther's dead brother-in-law, summoned from the grave by the witch Nimueh. He is seeking revenge for the death of his sister, who died giving birth to Arthur by way of magic from Nimueh. Merlin learns from the Great Dragon that only a special sword (Excalibur), burnished with the Dragon's fiery breath, can kill the knight. The Dragon warns Merlin that only Arthur can wield it. Arthur is next to fight the Black Knight, but Uther takes Excalibur and faces the knight himself, slaying him in the end. Now that the sword has been wielded by someone other than Arthur, it is capable of being used for evil; to prevent that, the Great Dragon instructs Merlin to hide Excalibur far from the reach of mortal men. Note: The original script for this episode was published on the BBC website.
10	10	"The Moment of Truth"	David Moore	Ben Vanstone	22 November 2008	7.03
Hearing that his village is being threatened by a warlord and his gang, Merlin travels home with Gwen and Morgana to help. Arthur joins them and does his best to drill the peaceful villagers into a fighting force, but Merlin's friend William dismisses him as an egotist. Gwen calls Arthur out on his insensitivity to the villagers' humble ways and also fights for the women's right to fight. But when it comes to the fight, the villagers are still inexperienced and Merlin risks exposing himself as sorcerer to drive off the invaders. During the battle, Merlin conjures up a storm to drive off the invaders, which Arthur sees. During the ensuing battle, William saves Arthur's life, and takes the blame for the magic storm. Arthur pardons William on his (William's) death bed.
11	11	"The Labyrinth of Gedref"	Stuart Orme	Howard Overman	29 November 2008	6.71
Despite Merlin's protests, Arthur kills a unicorn while out hunting and presents Uther with its horn. Father and son ignore Gaius's warning that it is bad luck to kill a unicorn, and soon the crops wither and the well water turns to sand. The mystic Anhora, guardian of the unicorns, arrives in Camelot to tell Arthur that his stupidity has cursed the land and that he alone can lift that curse. He faces a number of tests, first in Camelot and then in the Labyrinth of Gedref. Merlin follows him despite being told to stay behind. In the end, Arthur saves the day with a demonstration of selflessness, ultimately restoring the welfare of Camelot and the unicorn itself.
12	12	"To Kill the King"	Stuart Orme	Jake Michie	6 December 2008	6.31
Gwen's father Tom (Camelot's blacksmith) is approached by Tauren, who possesses the alchemist's stone and wants Tom's help in turning base metal into gold which he intends to use to overthrow the king. The palace guards raid the smithy and Tauren escapes while Tom is caught and sentenced to death. Morgana gives him the key to the cells, but Tom is killed trying to escape. Having spent time in the cells following an argument with Uther, Morgana retrieves the alchemist's stone and delivers it to Tauren. She joins Tauren's plot to assassinate Uther, unaware that Merlin is listening in. On the pretext of visiting her father's grave, Morgana leads Uther into Tauren's trap. Merlin must decide whether Uther's life is worth saving. However, in the end, it is Morgana who has a change of heart and saves Uther.
13	13	"Le Morte d'Arthur"	David Moore	Julian Jones	13 December 2008	6.27
A huge monster, the Questing Beast, is on the loose near Camelot. Morgana has a nightmare of Arthur's death, but he ignores her warning and is bitten by the creature before Merlin slays it. The Great Dragon tells Merlin that in order to save Arthur he must travel to the Isle of the Blessed, where he meets Nimueh. She gives him the antidote (water from the Cup of Life) but warns him another life must be sacrificed to save Arthur's. Merlin gives the antidote to Arthur and the prince recovers, but Merlin's mother arrives in Camelot with a terrible illness. Merlin prepares to return to the Isle of the Blessed, however Gaius gets there first. As Gaius sacrifices himself, Merlin faces the greatest test so far of his emotions and his magic powers in a final showdown with Nimueh.
