= Eoin Macken =

Irish actor, model, author and director

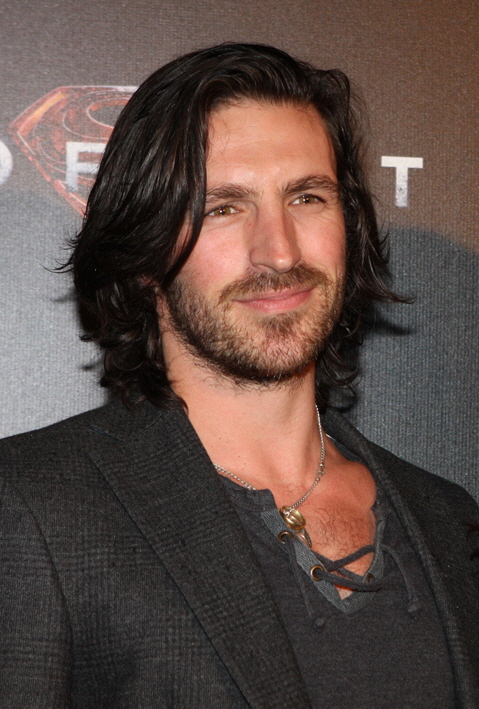
- Macken at the Man of Steel movie premiere in Sydney in June 2013
- Born: Eoin Christopher Macken; 21 February 1983 (age 43); Dublin, Ireland
- Occupations: Actor, director, model
- Years active: 2003–present
- Partner: Emanuela Postacchini
- Children: 1

Eoin Christopher Macken (born 21 February 1983) is an Irish actor, director, and model.

Macken has modelled for Abercrombie and Fitch, Ralph Lauren, and GQ, and has appeared in films such as Resident Evil, Close, Killing Jesus, and Centurion. He has appeared on television in series such as RTÉ's Fair City as Gavin Cluxton and in BBC series Merlin as Sir Gwaine. In addition, Macken has directed several feature films: Christian Blake in 2008, Dreaming for You, The Inside and Cold, and Here Are the Young Men. Macken also directed the documentary The Fashion of Modelling. He starred in the NBC series The Night Shift as T. C. Callahan, and Netflix show Nightflyers as Karl D'Branin, and in 2021 onwards stars in the NBC drama La Brea.

== Early life ==
Macken was born in Dublin. He has two sisters. Macken completed a Bachelor of Science degree in psychology at University College Dublin after he began his modeling and acting career at the university's fashion show in 2002 and 2003, after which he joined the model agency Morgan the Agency and was selected as the face of the Abercrombie and Fitch 2003 campaign. He also modeled for Ralph Lauren.

== Career ==
Macken's first major film role was in Studs in 2005, which starred Brendan Gleeson and Emmett J. Scanlan. He also appeared in the role of drug dealer Gavin Cluxton in several episodes of the TV series Fair City in 2008.

Macken wrote and edited his debut feature film Christian Blake, which premiered at the 2008 Mid Ulster Film Festival, before playing in the 2008 Galway Film Fleadh. It was released on 19 May 2009 with Celebrity Distribution and the sales company Around The Scenes Inc. He co-wrote and directed the song and video for Una Healy's song "Don't Leave Me Alone". It was the title track for the no-budget indie film, for which Healy wrote much of the soundtrack.

In 2008, he wrote, directed, and acted in his second feature film, Dreaming For You. The film featured a soundtrack composed by Dublin band, The Evora. The film was selected for the 2007 Los Angeles Short Film Festival, and the 2009 Galway Film Fleadh.

In 2009–10, Macken had roles in the BBC drama Small Island (playing an American soldier named Calhoon), in Neil Marshall's film Centurion, and in the second series of RTÉ's Raw. He appeared in Storyland, as well as Lee Cronin's film Through The Night, opposite Nora Jane Noone, and Siren opposite Anna Skellern. He directed an hour-length documentary on the Irish fashion industry The Fashion of Modelling which screened on RTÉ 2 on 24 May 2009.

Between 2010 and 2012, Macken played the recurring character of Gwaine (loosely based on the image of Gawain) in the BBC One TV series Merlin. He appeared in four episodes of the third series and all episodes of the fourth and fifth.

In October 2012 Macken completed shooting for Cold, a feature film released in 2013 written and directed by Macken, and he stars in the film alongside former co-star, Tom Hopper. The plot centres around two disconnected English brothers who are outcasts in a small village in the west of Ireland. Drawn back together by the unexpected death of their father, they are immediately at odds with each other until they find a girl dumped in the moors. The film was partially crowdfunded through an Indiegogo campaign. The film was later released under the name Leopard.

After directing a number of independent features, in 2018 Macken adapted Rob Doyle's award-winning novel Here Are the Young Men into a screenplay, and directed the resulting film. He is set to star alongside Elisha Cuthbert the horror movie The Cellar.

== Personal life ==
He is in a relationship with fellow actor Emanuela Postacchini. They have a daughter, Bianca, born in October 2024.

== Filmography ==
=== Film ===
Key
†	Denotes films that have not yet been released

Year	Title	Role	Notes
2006	Triple Bill	The Gunman	Short film
2006	Studs	Tosh	
2008	Christian Blake	Christian	Also writer and director
2008	Fifth Street	Janitor	Short film
2009	Once Upon a Time in Dublin	Ethan	
2009	Aces	Dealer	Short film
2009	Savage	Gym Changing Room Guy 2	
2009	The Rise of the Bricks	Dennis	
2009	Dreaming for You	Adam	Also writer and director
2010	Centurion	Achivir	
2010	Siren	Ken	
2010	Through the Night	Jay	Short film
2012	The Inside	The Man	Also director, writer and producer
2012	Suspension of Disbelief	Greg	
2013	The Callback Queen	Prince Cal	
2013	Cold	Jack	Also writer and director, also known as Leopard
2015	Paddy's in the Boot	Sean Ennis	Short film
2016	The Forest	Rob	
2016	Resident Evil: The Final Chapter	Doc	
2017	The Wedding Invitation	Graham	
2018	Crossmaglen	Conor	Short film
2019	Close	Conall Sinclair	
2019	The Hole in the Ground	Jay Caul	
2019	Caitlín	Luke	Short film
2020	I Am Fear	Joshua	
2020	Here Are the Young Men	Homeless American	Also writer and director
2021	Till Death	Mark	
2022	I Used to Be Famous	Austin Roberts	
2022	The Cellar	Brian Woods	
2026	Just Play Dead	Dani	
TBA	Grey Elephant †	Dylan	Also writer and director
TBA	Vivien & the Florist †	John Merivale	Post-production

=== Television ===
Year	Title	Role	Notes
2008	Fair City	Gavin Cluxton	Season 19: 10 episodes.
2009	Pubworld	Chuck Madsen	TV film
2009	Small Island	Calhoon	TV film
2010	Raw	Jack	Season 2 episode 4
2010	The Tudors	English Officer	Season 4 episode 7
2010–2012	Merlin	Sir Gwaine	30 episodes (recurring role)
2014–2017	The Night Shift	Dr. T. C. Callahan	Main cast (45 episodes)
2015	Killing Jesus	Antipas, the Tetrarch of Galilee	
2018	Nightflyers	Karl D'Branin	Main role (10 episodes)
2020	Stumptown	Zac Knight	Season 1 episode 14
2021–2024	La Brea	Gavin Harris	Main role
2024	Borderline	Phillip Boyd	Main role
2025	Ransom Canyon	Davis Collins	Main role
