= Adetomiwa Edun =

Nigerian actor (born 1984)

- Born: Babatunde Adetomiwa Stafford; 1985 (age 40–41); Lagos, Nigeria
- Education: Christ's College, Cambridge; Royal Academy of Dramatic Art (B.A., 2008)
- Occupation: Actor
- Years active: 2000–present
- Notable work: Alex Hunter
- Father: Wale Edun
- Relatives: Kwame Anthony Appiah (uncle)

Babatunde Adetomiwa Stafford "Tomiwa" Edun, (born 1985) is a UK-based Nigerian actor. He is best known for his roles as Sir Elyan in the television show Merlin, Marcus Young in Bates Motel and Alex Hunter in the football video games FIFA 17, FIFA 18, FIFA 19, FIFA 20 and EA Sports FC 27.

== Early life ==
Edun was born on 16 March 1985 in Lagos, Nigeria, to Nigerian financier and politician Olawale Edun and half-Ghanaian, half-English Amy Adwoa (née Appiah). His maternal uncle is the philosopher, cultural theorist and novelist Kwame Anthony Appiah. His maternal grandparents were Ghanaian lawyer, diplomat and politician Joseph Emmanuel Appiah – a Nana of the Ashanti people through whom Edun is a descendant of Ghanaian warrior emperor Osei Tutu – and art historian and author Peggy Cripps, daughter of Sir Stafford Cripps, Chancellor of the Exchequer from 1947 to 1950 and son of the first Lord Parmoor. Through his father, meanwhile, Edun claims direct descent from the colonial Egba official Adegboyega Edun.

Edun moved to the United Kingdom at the age of 11. He attended Eton College from the age of 13, before reading Classics at Christ's College, Cambridge (University of Cambridge). In his final year at Christ's College, he won the dissertation prize for his thesis on Homer's Odyssey. His father, a financier, encouraged Edun to enter banking as a career, and he interned with Citigroup. He considered studying for a Master of Philosophy degree, but decided to attend the Royal Academy of Dramatic Art (RADA) instead.

== Career ==
In 2000, Edun appeared at the Edinburgh Fringe Festival as the character Clifford in the show Kassandra by Ivo Stourton. Edun attended RADA, appearing in several productions and graduating with a Bachelor of Arts in Acting in 2008. Following his graduation from RADA, he played small parts in productions at the Almeida Theatre and the Liverpool Playhouse. He also played Macbeth in a production of the eponymous play by the National Theatre, earning praise for being "charismatic" and a "fine verse speaker". In 2009, Edun became only the second black actor to play Romeo at the Globe Theatre when he was cast in Dominic Dromgoole's production of Romeo and Juliet. He also appeared in Slaves, a play by Rex Obano.

Edun has also appeared in several television shows. In 2009, he appeared in an episode of The Fixer, before a role in Law & Order: UK as a soldier returning from the war in Afghanistan. During series three of Merlin, Edun appeared as Elyan in three episodes, and was upgraded to a recurring character in series four. Elyan was killed off during the fifth and final series of Merlin in 2012. In 2011, he appeared in two episodes of The Hour as the character Sey, and reprised the role for three episodes in 2012. In 2015, Edun had a recurring role on the third season of Bates Motel as Marcus Young, a candidate for sheriff of White Pine Bay, which he followed with roles in Lucifer, Legends, and Death in Paradise. He also appeared as Mr. Brocks in the 2016 Doctor Who Christmas Special. The following year, Edun portrayed a war criminal in an episode of Elementary.

Edun performed motion capture and voiced the role of Alex Hunter in the video game by EA Sports, FIFA 17, and reprised his role in the sequels FIFA 18 and FIFA 19.

== Filmography ==
=== Film ===
Year	Title	Role	Notes
2012	Dara Ju	Tunde Akande	Short film
2014	Dying of the Light	Mbui	Action / Drama / Thriller
2015	Cinderella	Trooper	Fairy Tale / Adventure
2017	What Happened to Monday	Eddie	also known as Seven Sisters
2017	Banana Island Ghost	The boyfriend	Nigerian production
2018	In the Cloud	Theo Jones	Thriller
2018	A Serial Killer's Guide to Life	Ben	Crime / Horror
2018	Where Hands Touch	American Soldier	Drama / Romance War
2019	Honeymoon	Pete	Short film
2020	Eyimofe	Seyi	
2021	Petra	Callum'	Short film
2024	Argylle	Deputy Nolan	Spy / Action / Comedy / Thriller

=== Television ===
Year	Title	Role	Notes
2009	The Fixer	Young Guy	Episode: "Episode #2.6" (2.6)
2010	Law & Order: UK	Lloyd Benson	Episode: "Shaken" (4.3)
2010–2012	Merlin	Sir Elyan	21 episodes
2011–2012	The Hour	Sey Ola	5 episodes
2015	Bates Motel	Marcus Young	4 episodes
2015	Lucifer	2Vile	Episode: "Pilot" (1.1)
2015	Legends	Manners	2 episodes
2016	Death in Paradise	Ellery Wallace	Episode: "One for the Road" (5.2)
2016	Doctor Who	Mr. Brock	Episode: "The Return of Doctor Mysterio" (10.0)
2017	Elementary	Akello Akeny	Episode: "Moving Targets" (5.22)
2018	A Discovery of Witches	Sean	3 episodes
2019	The Capture	Faisal	2 episodes
2020–2021	Trying	Luke	3 episodes
2022	Young Wallander	Samuel Osei	6 episodes
2023	The Chelsea Detective	Greg Milton-Elwes	Episode: "The Blue Room" (2.1)
2023	Trigger Point	Alex	4 episodes

=== Video games ===
Year	Game	Voice role	Notes
2016	FIFA 17	Alex Hunter	Also motion capture
2017	FIFA 18	Alex Hunter	Also motion capture
2018	FIFA 19	Alex Hunter	Also motion capture
2019	FIFA 20	Alex Hunter	Also motion capture
2023	Cyberpunk 2077: Phantom Liberty		
2026	EA Sports FC 27	Alex Hunter	Also motion capture

=== Theatre ===
Year	Title	Role	Director	Company	Notes
2009	Romeo and Juliet	Romeo		Shakespeare's Globe Theatre	
2013	Lionboy	Charlie Ashanti		Annabel Arden's Production	
2016	The Deep Blue Sea	Jackie Jackson		National Theatre	
2018	Translations	Lieutenant Yolland		National Theatre	
2024	Romeo and Juliet	Lord Capulet	Jamie Lloyd	The Jamie Lloyd Company	

== See also ==
- Black British nobility, Edun's class in Britain
