= The Lesson (2023 film) =

Film by Alice Troughton

- Film poster
- Directed by: Alice Troughton
- Written by: Alex MacKeith
- Produced by: Camille Gatin; Cassandra Sigsgaard; Judy Tossell; Fabien Westerhoff
- Starring: Richard E. Grant; Julie Delpy; Daryl McCormack
- Cinematography: Anna Patarakina
- Edited by: Paulo Pandolpho
- Music by: Isobel Waller-Bridge
- Production companies: Poison Chef; Egoli Tossell; Jeva Films
- Distributed by: Universal Pictures; Focus Features
- Release dates: June 11, 2023 (Tribeca); September 22, 2023 (United Kingdom and Ireland)
- Running time: 103 minutes
- Country: United Kingdom
- Language: English
- Box office: $310,746

The Lesson is a 2023 British psychological thriller film written by Alex MacKeith, directed by Alice Troughton and starring Richard E. Grant, Julie Delpy and Daryl McCormack.

In the way that the movie is structured, it is similar to a play: there are only five key characters and almost the entire story takes place in one location.

The story is centred around the interaction between five main characters: an Oxford graduate, Liam Somers -an aspiring writer- who is employed as a tutor by a wealthy family living in a large house in the countryside; their teenage son, Bertie Sinclair, who is to be tutored by Liam; and, finally, the son’s parents, who are a famous British writer, J.M. Sinclair and his French wife Hélène, who is an artist. The family employs a near-silent and enigmatic butler, Ellis, who is the fifth character: a person who sees everything but says nothing.

== Plot ==
The film opens in medias res to Liam Somers, who is being interviewed about his debut novel. The main story begins after Liam is asked what inspired him to write the novel, which is about a declining and failing patriarch who tries to reassert control over his family and career.

Liam, a PhD student of English literature at the University of Oxford, has been working for several years on a novel he wants to finish. Through a tuition agency, he is offered an assignment with a wealthy family, whose son, Bertie, needs a tutor to prepare for the university's entrance exam. When he arrives at the family's country estate, Liam is introduced to Bertie and his parents: J.M. Sinclair, a famous writer who has not published a book in some time; and Hélène, who is an artist. Liam is given the use of a small house on the estate, from where he can look over to J.M.'s personal study in the main house.

At first, Liam eventually manages to establish a good rapport with Bertie, but Hélène is cold and distant while J.M. is narcissistic and domineering. Relations become more cordial with J.M. after Liam helps him with his malfunctioning printer. Liam learns that Bertie’s brother, Felix, committed suicide relatively recently, drowning himself in the pond in front of the Sinclairs' villa. The topic is taboo in the household, as Felix’s death has clearly affected deeply all the remaining members of the family.

J.M. is in the process of finishing a novel and offers to pay Liam to proofread the work. In return, Liam asks J.M. to have a look at his own manuscript. In his critique of J.M.’s manuscript, Liam says he found the first two-thirds very compelling, in a style that is quite different from what J.M. usually writes, but finds the ending quite poor and tonally at odds with the rest of the novel. J.M. clearly disagrees with this verdict and is angered by Liam’s feedback.

When Liam asks J.M. what he thinks of his own manuscript, J.M. treats him with undisguised contempt, telling the young man that he cannot possibly have any talent for writing and should focus on a teaching career instead. Humiliated, Liam tears the manuscript to pieces and throws it in the pond.

While J.M. is away from the estate to meet with his publisher and Bertie is off at a party, Liam and Hélène begin an affair. Encouraged by Hélène, he enters the server room, next to J.M.’s study, where the writer keeps a second computer. On that computer, Liam finds the full (and only) electronic version of J.M.'s novel, in the form of a single Microsoft Word document which Liam deletes. However, Liam and Hélène realise that the unfinished novel was actually written by Felix, who killed himself before he could complete it. What J.M. had been doing was write an ending that he tagged onto his elder son’s story, while claiming that he wrote all of it.

When J.M. returns, he soon realises that the electronic copy of his novel has vanished. He turns to Liam, who blames this incident on a virus that would have infected the server. J.M. becomes even more distraught when he looks for the only paper copy of the novel that he had and cannot find it, unaware that Liam threw it into the pond. He angrily suspects Bertie of wrongdoing but cannot prove anything.

Since he knows that Liam has a photographic memory, J.M. asks that he write the entire novel all over again by hand, so that J.M. can present a copy to his publisher. Liam does so, but ends up writing two endings: J.M.’s original ending, which he thought was lousy, and another ending, which is his own. J.M. does not seem to be fully aware of the fact that Liam has written an alternative ending, but his wife reads both and declares Liam’s to be the superior version.

When the manuscript is finished, J.M. and Liam celebrate, becoming drunk. The older man challenges Liam to a swim in the pond. As they approach the pond, Liam confronts J.M. with the idea that Felix wrote the bulk of the novel, understanding that Felix killed himself because his father had cruelly and unfairly panned his writing. Liam further lets J.M. know that he has slept with his wife. J.M. flies into a rage and begins a fight. When they fall into the pond, J.M. tries to drown Liam, but the younger man escapes. Hélène, having heard the commotion, walks over to the pond and coldly looks at her husband before walking away. Having lost her esteem, J.M. drowns himself.

Liam is horrified when Hélène tells him about J.M.'s death, which she will tell first responders was accidental if Liam leaves immediately and adheres to his NDA. When Liam demands credit for writing the new ending, she threatens to accuse him of murdering the writer. Realising that Hélène engineered this whole situation in order to trigger her husband's death, Liam agrees. He packs his bags and pauses as the estate gates opens for his departure. He hears sirens approaching and smiles, then walks on. Back in the present, Bertie is seen smiling in a studio audience during a TV interview about Liam's new book, based on an aging patriarch and his family. Liam acknowledges Bertie and they both smile.

== Cast ==
- Daryl McCormack as Liam Somers
- Richard E. Grant as J.M. Sinclair
- Julie Delpy as Hélène Sinclair
- Stephen McMillan as Bertie Sinclair
- Crispin Letts as Ellis

== Release ==
In May 2022, Bleecker Street acquired United States distribution rights to the then titled film, The Tutor.

The film premiered at the 2023 Tribeca Festival. It was released in cinemas on 7 July, 2023 in the United States and in cinemas in the United Kingdom on 22 September, 2023 by Universal Pictures and Focus Features.

== Reception ==
On the review aggregator website Rotten Tomatoes, 76% of 101 critics' reviews are positive, with an average rating of 6.6/10. The website's consensus reads: "Even if it isn't always quite as clever as it seems to think it is, sharp performances from an outrageously talented cast make The Lesson worth learning." Metacritic, which uses a weighted average, assigned the film a score of 62 out of 100, based on 18 critics, indicating "generally favorable" reviews.

Guy Lodge of Variety gave the film a positive review and wrote, "Who is writing what, and to what extent it matters, are the questions that keep director Alice Troughton and screenwriter Alex MacKeith’s mutual debut feature interesting, even as it slides into occasional, overheated cliché." Caryn James of The Hollywood Reporter also gave the film a very positive review, citing "a clever script that keeps us off guard, the setting of a gracious country estate whose sumptuous visuals mask a dark undercurrent, and a score that entices us into an increasingly unsettling world..."
