= Till Death (film) =

2021 film directed by S.K. Dale

- Theatrical release poster
- Directed by: S.K. Dale
- Written by: Jason Carvey
- Produced by: David Leslie Johnson-McGoldrick; Jeffrey Greenstein; Jonathan Yunger; Jana Karaivanova; Yariv Lerner; Tanner Mobley; Les Weldon
- Starring: Megan Fox; Eoin Macken; Callan Mulvey; Jack Roth; Aml Ameen
- Cinematography: Jamie Cairney
- Edited by: Alex Fenn; Sylvie Landra
- Music by: Walter Mair
- Production companies: Millennium Media; Brave Carrot; Campbell Grobman Films
- Distributed by: Screen Media Films
- Release date: July 2, 2021 (United States)
- Running time: 88 minutes
- Country: United States
- Language: English

Till Death is a 2021 American thriller film directed by S.K. Dale in his directorial debut, from a screenplay by Jason Carvey. It stars Megan Fox, Callan Mulvey, Eoin Macken, Aml Ameen, and Jack Roth.

Till Death was released in the United States by Screen Media Films in a limited number of theaters on July 2, 2021, and was simultaneously released on video on demand. The film received generally favorable reviews, with highlights to Fox's performance and Dale's direction.

The title is a reference to the well-known phrase "Till death do us part"; a phrase often included in Christian wedding vows.

== Plot ==
Emma is unhappily married to her cold and controlling husband, Mark, who works as a criminal attorney. After ending her affair with Tom, a partner at her husband's firm, Emma goes out with Mark to celebrate their anniversary. Mark surprises Emma with a necklace made of steel and drives her to a secluded lake house, which they used to visit early in their relationship. That evening, Mark apologizes for his past behavior, and they make love.

The next morning, Emma wakes to find herself handcuffed to Mark, who abruptly commits suicide by shooting himself in the head. Forced to drag his corpse everywhere she goes, Emma discovers that Mark destroyed her phone and removed every sharp item from the house. She eventually finds the keys to their SUV and reaches the garage. When she tries to start the vehicle, the engine won't turn over, and she sees that Mark has siphoned out the gas tank. The car's audio plays a taunting message from Mark that reveals that he knew of her affair with Tom.

Hours later, Tom arrives at the lake house. He tells Emma that he was summoned by texts from her phone and that Mark was facing disbarment for illegal activities at his practice. They both realize that Mark sent the messages to lure Tom just as a mysterious truck is seen approaching the house. Emma hides while Tom greets a man named Jimmy from the truck. Jimmy says that he is there to fix the plumbing and refuses to leave, despite Tom's attempts to dissuade him. Jimmy's brother, Bobby, gets out of the truck and stabs Tom to death. It is revealed that Bobby was a stalker who once attacked Emma and just got out of prison after he served 10 years.

Emma manages to evade the men and makes it to the boat shed. She uses an anchor to cut herself free from Mark's corpse and hides just as the men enter the shed. Emma overhears them reveal that Mark hired them to kill her and that they must find the diamonds that they were promised. Bobby suspects the diamonds are in the bedroom safe, which requires Mark's fingerprints and a code that Emma would know.

As the men search the house, Emma finds a fuel can and tries refueling the SUV, but Bobby slashes the tires. Emma then makes her way to the attic and lures the men there. She knocks Bobby out with a golf club and locks Jimmy into a nearby room. She attempts to escape in Tom's car, but Bobby intervenes. Emma manages to dial 911 on Tom's phone before she is knocked unconscious. She later wakes up in the bedroom and is once again cuffed to Mark's body.

Bobby tells Emma the safe's code is the date that Mark proposed to her. When she refuses to cooperate, Bobby threatens to cut off her toes. Jimmy objects and points Mark's gun at Bobby. Emma agrees to reveal the code if she is set free first. Emma is uncuffed and tells them the code. Bobby opens the safe, only to find a hacksaw inscribed with a clue that implies the diamonds are in Emma's necklace, which has no latch and is impossible to remove. Bobby realizes that the necklace can be retrieved only by decapitating Emma. Jimmy tries wrestling the saw away from Bobby but is accidentally impaled on a coat hook, which kills him. Enraged, Bobby attacks Emma and stabs her in the leg. She manages to fight him off and cuff Bobby to Mark's body.

Emma makes it to Tom's SUV, with Bobby in pursuit. She hits Bobby with the SUV but crashes into the boat shed, getting the truck stuck in the snow. Emma exits the truck and fights Bobby on the frozen lake. She stabs Bobby in the shoulder just as the ice gives way. Mark's corpse falls into the lake and drags Bobby with him. Bobby manages to grab Emma and to pull her in as well. As they sink, Emma grabs the knife out of Bobby's shoulder and stabs him in the eye. Mark's body drags Bobby down to his death as Emma swims up to the surface.

Lying atop the ice, Emma removes her wedding ring and lets it roll into the lake as sirens are heard approaching in the background.

== Cast ==
- Megan Fox as Emma Davenport
- Eoin Macken as Mark
- Callan Mulvey as Bobby Ray
- Jack Roth as Jimmy
- Aml Ameen as Tom

== Production ==
In February 2020, it was announced that Megan Fox had joined the cast of the film, with S.K. Dale directing from a screenplay by Jason Carvey. In August 2020, Callan Mulvey, Eoin Macken, Aml Ameen and Jack Roth joined the cast of the film.

Principal photography began in August 2020 in Sofia, Bulgaria. Production had been set to begin in March 2020 but was delayed by the COVID-19 pandemic.

Over the course of four to five weeks, Fox dragged a Bulgarian stuntman across the floor in every scene, and the time difference between the US and Bulgaria made her sleep only two to three hours a day.

== Release ==
In May 2021, Screen Media Films acquired distribution rights to the film. Till Death was released in the United States in a limited amount of theaters on July 2, 2021, and was simultaneously released on video on demand.

According to data reported to PostVOD (by Screen Engine) that was released in early July 2021, Till Death was singled out as one of the low-budget movies most likely to be watched by audiences on VOD, coming in second.

Jacob Oller of Paste Magazine listed the movie's trailer as one of the best of the week in June 2021.

== Reception ==
On the review aggregator website Rotten Tomatoes, 90% of 40 critics' reviews are positive. The website's consensus reads: "Elevated by S.K. Dale's inventive direction and Megan Fox's committed performance, Till Death will part the viewer with all but the edge of their seat." Metacritic, which uses a weighted average, assigned the film a score of 66 out of 100, based on 5 critics, indicating "generally favorable" reviews.

Writing for The New York Times, Beatrice Loayza said that "this straightforward romp focuses its attention on its cunning and no-nonsense scream queen. And what Fox lacks in dramatic prowess, she makes up for in pure, wicked magnetism." In his review for Variety, Manuel Betancourt said that, "Even as the twists and turns get ever more preposterous ... Dale’s direction and Fox’s commitment go a long way toward making Till Death a glossy, entertaining lark." Waldemar Dalenogare Neto declared that the film works because of Fox and said that he hoped that because of the "positive repercussions she would look for better roles ... [this] is an interesting film for those who like thriller."

Fox's performance was singled out positively by online critics, including Scott Weinberg (Thrillist), who admired the "very strong lead performance from Megan Fox;" Julian Roman (MovieWeb), who said she "delivers her career best performance;" Chad Collins (Dread Central), who said, "Megan Fox is always a welcome horror star, a contemporary scream queen with more grit and grunge than most, and she's as good here as she's ever been;" and Lee McCoy (DrumDums), who said, "It's a welcome return to horror for Megan Fox after 11 years since the cult classic Jennifer's Body.

In a review for Common Sense Media, Jeffrey M. Anderson said that "after a shaky start, this taut, vicious horror/thriller crackles to life with a dark sense of logic, a harrowing depiction of mental and emotional abuse, and a woman's boundless strength... it ultimately makes more sense than any Saw-related deathtraps." The previously mentioned MovieWeb review called SK Dale's debut "brilliant" and said, "He nails the Hitchcockian aspects of the narrative." Tomris Laffly, of RogerEbert.com, called the film "undemanding, a little silly, but a thoroughly engrossing and handsomely paced edge-of-your-seat experience all the same."
