= Rupert Young =

English actor (born 1978)

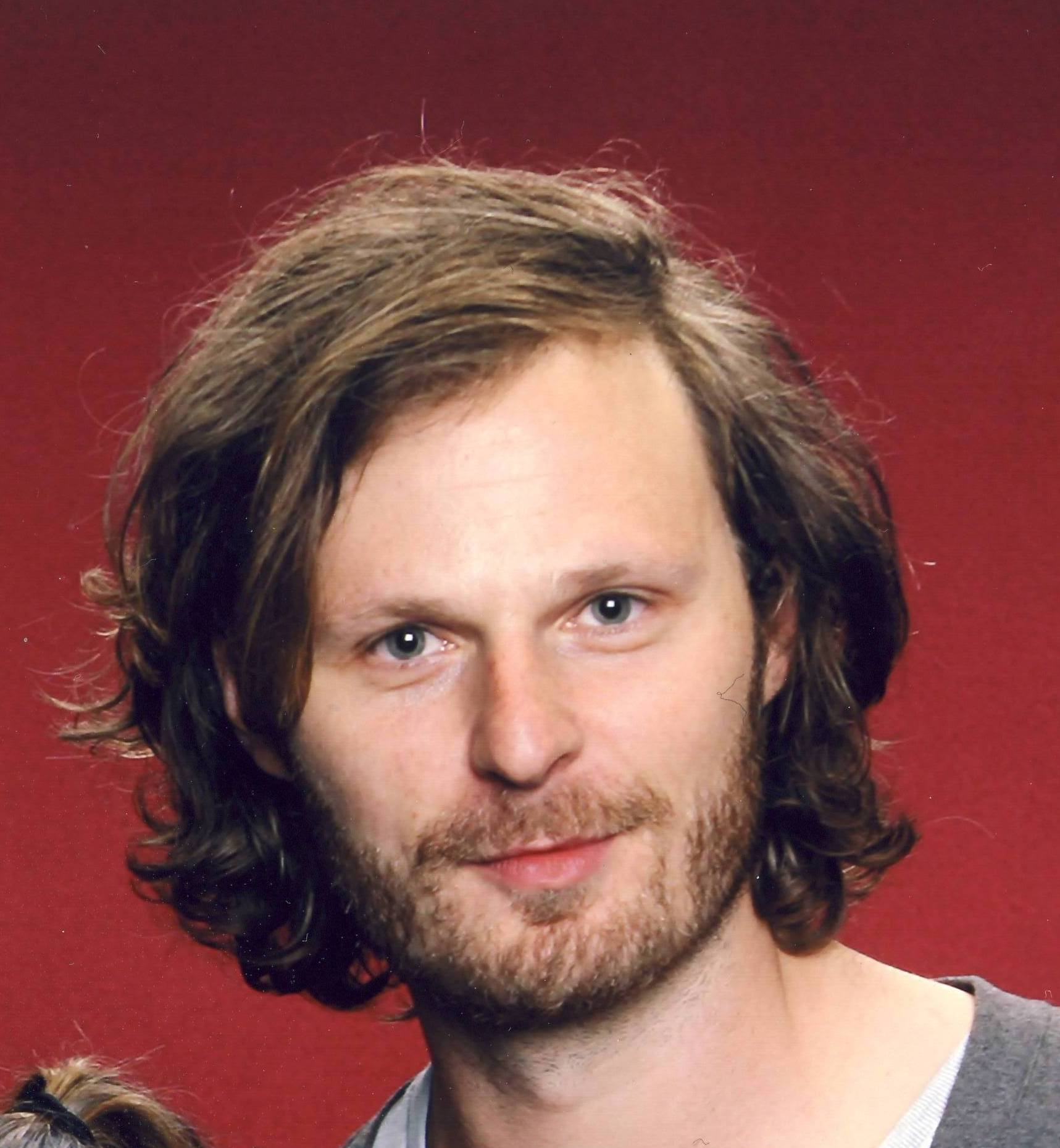
- Young in 2013
- Born: Rupert Francis Young; 16 May 1978 (age 48); Lambeth, London, England
- Education: London Academy of Music and Dramatic Art
- Occupation: Actor
- Years active: 2002–present

Rupert Francis Young (born 16 May 1978) is an English actor who is best known for his roles as Sir Leon in the BBC drama series Merlin and as Jack, The Lord Featherington in the Netflix series Bridgerton.

== Early life ==
Young was born on May 16, 1978 in Lambeth, London. He attended the London Academy of Music and Dramatic Art.

== Career ==
His television work includes episodes of Merlin, Doc Martin, Foyle's War, Hotel Babylon, The White Queen and other work. His films include Dirty Filthy Love, a 2004 television film alongside Michael Sheen, Writers Retreat, released in 2015 and The Secret Garden in 2020.

Between 2019 and 2022 (at intervals, due to covid theatre closures) he portrayed Larry Murphy in the West End debut of the stage show Dear Evan Hansen at the Noël Coward Theatre. In 2020, Young was nominated for Laurence Olivier Award for Best Actor in a Supporting Role in a Musical for Dear Evan Hansen at the Laurence Olivier Awards.

In 2022 he was cast as Lord Jack Featherington in series 2 of Bridgerton.

== Filmography ==
=== Television ===
Year	Title	Role	Notes
2004	Island at War	British Soldier	Episode: "Eve of the War"
2004	Dirty Filthy Love	Josh	TV film
2004	Doc Martin	Adrian Pitts	2 episodes
2006	Foyle's War	Armed Guard	Episode: 'Bad Blood"
2006	Heartbeat	Zak	Episode: "Wine and Roses"
2008	Primeval	Mike	Episode: "Mealworms, Indeed"
2009	Hotel Babylon	Justice	Episode; "#4.4"
2009–2012	Merlin	Sir Leon	Recurring character; 39 episodes
2010	Shameless	Marc Arlington	Episode: "The End of The Affair"
2010	Doctor Who	Roman	Uncredited; Episode: "The Pandorica Opens"
2013	The White Queen	Sir William Herbert	Episode: "The Bad Queen"
2016	People Just Do Nothing	Joshua	Episode: "Record Deal"
2017	The Good Karma Hospital	Sunny Macintosh	Episode: "#1.3"
2017	Will	Sir Walter Raleigh	Episode: "Brave New World"
2017	Judge Rinder's Crown Court	James Byron	2 episodes
2018	The Bisexual	James (reporter)	Episode: "#1.1"
2022	Bridgerton	Lord Jack Featherington	Main role (series 2); 8 episodes
2024	The New Look	Malcom Muggeridge	Episode: "What a Difference"
2025	Death in Paradise	Callum Jones	Episode: "#14.8"

=== Film ===
Year	Title	Role	Notes
2009	Just Because You're Paranoid...	Derek	Short film
2012	This Love	Other Man	Short film
2015	Writers Retreat	Alisdair	
2020	The Secret Garden	Marcus	
TBA	By the Throat	Alex	Post-production

=== Theatre ===
Year	Title	Role	Director	Venue	Notes	Ref.
2002	The Wonderful World of Dissocia	Nurse	Anthony Nielson	London Academy of Music and Dramatic Art		
2003	Today	Edward Longresse	Gari Jones	London Academy of Music and Dramatic Art		
2004	The Fix	Cal Chandler	Anne Durham & Stephen Jameson	London Academy of Music and Dramatic Art		
2004	Comedy of Errors	Luciana	Stephen Jameson	Wild Tyme		
2004	Jacques Brel Is Alive and Well and Living in Paris		Linda Edwards	Landor Theatre		
2005	H.M.S. Pinafore	Sailor	Ian Talbot	Regent's Park Open Air Theatre		
2005	Twelfth Night	Valentine	Timothy Sheader	Regent's Park Open Air Theatre		
2005	Cymbeline	Guiderius	Rachel Kavanaugh	Regent's Park Open Air Theatre		
2006	Sleeping Beauty	Prince Peter	Jeremy Bond	Salisbury Playhouse		
2007	French Without Tears	Brian Curtis	Paul Miller	—N/a	English Touring Theatre	
2008	Never So Good	American Lieutenant	Howard Davies	Royal National Theatre		
2008	Afterlife	Kurt	Michael Blakemore	Royal National Theatre		
2010	Much Ado About Nothing	Benedick	Stephen Jameson	Shakespeare's Globe		
2011	Company	Bobby	Joe Fredericks	Southwark Playhouse		
2014	Tonight at 8:30	Simon	Blanche McIntrye	Nuffield Theatre		
2015	High Society	Dexter Haven	Maria Friedman	The Old Vic		
2016	The Philanderer	Leonard Charteris	Paul Miller	Orange Tree Theatre		
2016	While the Sun Shines	Lieutenant Mulvaney	Christopher Luscombe	Theatre Royal Bath		
2017	Gaslight	Jack Manningham	Keith Allen	—N/a	National Tour	
2018	Twelfth Night	Duke Orsino	Kwame Kwei-Armah & Oskar Eustis	Young Vic		
2019	Plenty	Codename Laser	Kate Hewitt	Chinchester Festival Theatre		
2019	Dear Evan Hansen	Larry Murphy	Michael Greif	Noël Coward Theatre	Original West End Production	

== Awards and nominations ==
Year	Award	Category	Work	Result	Ref.
2020	Laurence Olivier Awards	Best Actor in a Supporting Role in a Musical	Dear Evan Hansen	Nominated	
