= Alice Troughton =

British television director

- Born: Aylesbury, Buckinghamshire, England
- Education: University of Kent
- Occupations: Film director; television director; producer
- Years active: 2002–present

Alice Troughton is a British film and television director known for her work on Merlin, Doctor Who and its spin-offs Torchwood and The Sarah Jane Adventures. In 2023, she made her feature film debut with The Lesson.

== Career ==
Troughton studied drama at the University of Kent, where in her second year she directed Hamlet. She realised she wanted to be a television director when she was 32 years old, having worked as a fringe-theatre director, writer, personal driver at ICM and BBC Films and care worker. In 2002, she enrolled in the Doctors directing course. The same year in India, Troughton filmed her first short film called Refuge, based on the diary of a young Tibetan woman. It was later followed by another short film, Doris the Builder, starring Tom Ellis and based on a true story from her hometown, Aylesbury, about a builder who took a load of breast-enhancing hormones for a dare.

From 2006 to 2010, Troughton directed episodes of each of Torchwood, The Sarah Jane Adventures, and Doctor Who. She was only the second person (after Colin Teague) to direct episodes of all three shows, which are set in a shared universe. Despite their shared surname and common association with Doctor Who, Troughton is not related to actor Patrick Troughton, who played the Second Doctor in the 1960s. Her directing in the franchise received overwhelmingly positive reviews, particularly for the Doctor Who episode "Midnight". Since then, she has gone on to become a leading director, working on acclaimed award-winning British shows such as BBC Three's In the Flesh and Channel 4's Cucumber and Baghdad Central. For her work on Cucumber, she was nominated for Best Director: Fiction at the 2015 Royal Television Society Craft & Design Awards. In the US, she worked on The CW's superhero series The Flash and Legends of Tomorrow and Netflix's science fiction series Lost in Space.

For Doctor Who, she cast Colin Morgan in his second television role as the conflicted teenager Jethro Cane, which contributed to him being cast in Merlin, where Troughton became one of the regular directors from the second series onwards. The two later collaborated on the BBC supernatural horror drama The Living and the Dead.

Her debut feature film The Lesson, starring Richard E. Grant, Julie Delpy and Daryl McCormack, premiered at the 2023 Tribeca Festival.

== Filmography ==
=== Film ===
Year	Title	Notes	Ref.
2002	Refuge	Short film	
2004	Doris the Builder	Short film; also writer	
2023	The Lesson		

=== Television ===
Year	Title	Notes	Ref.
2002–2004	Doctors	23 episodes	
2004–2005	Holby City	6 episodes	
2004–2006	EastEnders	20 episodes: Episodes dated 5 to 9 January 2004; Episodes dated 31 May to 4 June 2004; Episodes dated 29 August to 2 September 2005; Episodes dated 6 to 9 June 2006	
2006	No Angels	3 episodes	
2006	Torchwood	2 episodes: "Small Worlds"; "Out of Time"	
2007–2010	The Sarah Jane Adventures	10 episodes	
2008	Doctor Who	3 episodes: "The Poison Sky" (Rose Tyler cameo scene, uncredited); "The Doctor's Daughter"; "Midnight"	
2009	Casualty	2 episodes	
2009	Tonight's the Night	Doctor Who sketch	
2009–2012	Merlin	13 episodes	
2012	Silk	2 episodes	
2013	Frankie	2 episodes	
2013	Atlantis	5 episodes	
2014	In the Flesh	2 episodes	
2015	Cucumber	3 episodes	
2015	Teen Wolf	Episode: "Required Reading"	
2016	The Flash	Episode: "Flash Back"	
2016	The Living and the Dead	3 episodes	
2016–2017	Legends of Tomorrow	2 episodes	
2017–2020	Tin Star	3 episodes	
2018	Lost in Space	Episode: "The Robinsons Were Here"	
2018	A Discovery of Witches	3 episodes	
2018	Lore	3 episodes	
2020	Baghdad Central	3 episodes	
2022	The Midwich Cuckoos	2 episodes; also executive producer	
2023	Boat Story	2 episodes	
