= Merlin (2008 TV series) =

British fantasy-adventure television series (2008–2012)

- Genre: Medieval fantasy Adventure; Comedy drama
- Created by: Julian Jones; Jake Michie; Johnny Capps; Julian Murphy
- Starring: Colin Morgan; Angel Coulby; Bradley James; Katie McGrath; Anthony Head (Series 1–4); Nathaniel Parker (Series 4); Richard Wilson; John Hurt
- Theme music composer: Rob Lane
- Opening theme: "Merlin's Arrival at Camelot"
- Ending theme: "The Call of Destiny"
- Composers: Rob Lane; Rohan Stevenson
- Country of origin: United Kingdom
- Original language: English
- No. of series: 5
- No. of episodes: 65 (list of episodes)

Production
- Executive producers: Julie Gardner; Bethan Jones
- Producer: Sara Hamill
- Production locations: Wales; Kent; France
- Running time: 45–50 minutes
- Production company: Shine TV

Original release
- Network: BBC One; BBC One HD (Series 4 – Series 5)
- Release: 20 September 2008 – 24 December 2012

Related
- Merlin: Secrets and Magic

Merlin is a British fantasy-adventure comedy drama television programme, loosely based on the Arthurian legends regarding the close relations of Merlin and King Arthur. Created by Julian Jones, Jake Michie, Johnny Capps and Julian Murphy for the BBC, it was broadcast for five series on BBC One between 20 September 2008 and 24 December 2012. The programme starred Colin Morgan, Bradley James, Katie McGrath, Angel Coulby, Richard Wilson, Anthony Head and John Hurt.

The programme is a reimagining of the legend, in which young warlock Merlin is sent to the kingdom of Camelot by his mother because of his "special gift". After saving Prince Arthur's life in the first episode, he becomes Arthur's manservant. Merlin soon learns that the reason for his gift is to protect Arthur, but Merlin must hide his powers because magic was banned in Camelot by Arthur's father, King Uther Pendragon, and those caught practising it are executed. Over the years and after several adventures together, Merlin and Arthur become trusted friends and companions, with the former doing his best to influence the latter into becoming the king he is destined to be.

Merlin was nominated for several awards, winning the 2011 British Academy Television Award for best visual effects. Broadcasting rights were sold to over 180 countries.

== Series overview ==
Merlin is a young and extremely powerful warlock, who arrives in the kingdom of Camelot after his mother, Hunith arranges for him to stay with the court physician, Gaius, who is also Merlin's maternal uncle. He discovers that the king, Uther Pendragon, had outlawed magic twenty years earlier in an event known as the Great Purge and had imprisoned the last dragon, Kilgharrah, in the caves beneath the castle. After hearing a mysterious voice inside his head, Merlin makes his way to the cavern beneath the keep to find that he was hearing Kilgharrah's voice. Kilgharrah tells Merlin that he has an important destiny; to protect Uther's only son, Arthur, who will return magic to Camelot and unite the land of Albion.

When Merlin meets Arthur, Merlin considers him to be an arrogant bully and Arthur, likewise, is less than impressed with Merlin. After saving the prince's life, Merlin is appointed as his personal manservant. The two experience many adventures, over the course of which they come to respect and trust one another. But when Uther's actions eventually cause his ward, Morgana, to turn against Camelot and pursue a path of evil, Merlin and Arthur must join forces with friends, old and new, to protect their home and secure their destinies.

== Cast ==
From left to right: Guinevere, Gaius, Morgana, Merlin, Arthur, Uther and the Great Dragon in the background

- Colin Morgan as Merlin, Arthur's servant and Gaius' ward, who secretly develops his magical gifts under the gaze of kings Uther and Arthur, both of whom despise the art. Only Gaius, Hunith and Lancelot are aware of his magic. Merlin also has an alter-ego, "Dragoon the Great" (conjured when Merlin performs an aging spell upon himself), who is considered a criminal by Uther and Arthur, and inspires profound fear in Morgana who recognises him as Emrys, her prophetic nemesis. Despite keeping his capabilities under wraps for years, by the end of the show, more people become aware of Merlin's powers, including Mordred, Agravaine, Morgana, Gwen, and Arthur.
- Bradley James as Arthur Pendragon, the Prince and later King of Camelot, and the commander of the kingdom's knights. Despite being charged with carrying out his father's harsh edicts, Arthur is portrayed as a far more compassionate man, who defends the falsely accused before the king, and occasionally defies him. Arthur welcomes commoners Lancelot, Gwaine, Elyan, Mordred, and Percival as knights, and falls in love with Gwen, a serving girl, whom he later marries and makes Queen. He comes to regard his servant Merlin as a close friend and confidant, never realising how many times Merlin has had to save his life using magic. Arthur initially promises to lift Uther's ban on magic when he becomes king, but changes his mind when he thinks magic killed his father. Arthur is prophesied as "The Once and Future King", which means, even though he is killed in the final episode, Arthur Pendragon will rise again.
- Angel Coulby as Guinevere ("Gwen"), Morgana's servant who later becomes Queen of Camelot. Gwen is spirited and brave which leads to an attraction between her and Arthur. Their relationship at first causes conflict within the kingdom, as Uther considers her unworthy due to her low status and forbids Arthur to court her, even accusing her of witchcraft when Arthur's affections for her do not diminish. However, Gwen proves popular among the common people, and strives to make Arthur and his advisers approachable to them.
- Katie McGrath as Morgana Pendragon, Uther's ward who is later revealed to be his illegitimate daughter. Initially a kind and empathetic young woman, Morgana comes to despise Uther for his prejudice against magic and when she realizes he would never accept her if he knew of her magical powers, she begins covertly plotting against him. She becomes the show's primary villain by the third season, coveting Arthur's throne.
- Anthony Head as Uther Pendragon (seasons 1–4; guest season 5), Camelot's stubborn king, who shows Arthur repeated tough love and ruthlessly enforces the kingdom's strict ban on sorcery. Although meaning well, Uther earns himself many enemies in his brutal fight against magic. He is devoted to Morgana and her ultimate betrayal leaves him a broken man.
- Richard Wilson as Gaius, the court physician and Merlin's maternal uncle, surrogate father and mentor. Once a sorcerer himself, Gaius had abandoned the practice, but occasionally practises it when Merlin needs help. A wise man with a long memory, Gaius is one of Uther's closest advisers, and always among the first to realise what is really happening, when magic threatens the kingdom.
- Nathaniel Parker as Agravaine de Bois (season 4), Arthur's uncle who arrives in Camelot to assist him after Uther's breakdown. Initially a trusted adviser to Arthur, he is later identified as a traitor working with Morgana. Aggravaine blames Uther for the death of his sister, Arthur's mother, Queen Igraine.
- John Hurt as the voice of Kilgharrah, also known as the Great Dragon, is the last of his kind after Uther destroys all of his kin and makes an example of him by imprisoning him in a vast cave beneath the castle. Kilgharrah gives Merlin advice and forges the sword of Excalibur in his breath for Arthur, but persistently demands his freedom in return. Merlin eventually releases him, unwittingly unleashing a full-on assault on Camelot by Kilgharrah, seeking revenge for his murdered kin. But Merlin learns from his father that he is descended from a long line of dragonlords, and is able to use that power to control Kilgharrah. Subsequently, Merlin and Kilgharrah become close friends with Kilgharrah often helping Merlin when needed.

== Episodes ==
Series	Episodes	Originally released		Ave. UK viewers (millions)
Series	Episodes	First released	Last released	Ave. UK viewers (millions)
1	13	20 September 2008	13 December 2008	6.32
2	13	19 September 2009	19 December 2009	5.99
3	13	11 September 2010	4 December 2010	6.78
4	13	1 October 2011	24 December 2011	7.17
5	13	6 October 2012	24 December 2012	7.13

== Production ==
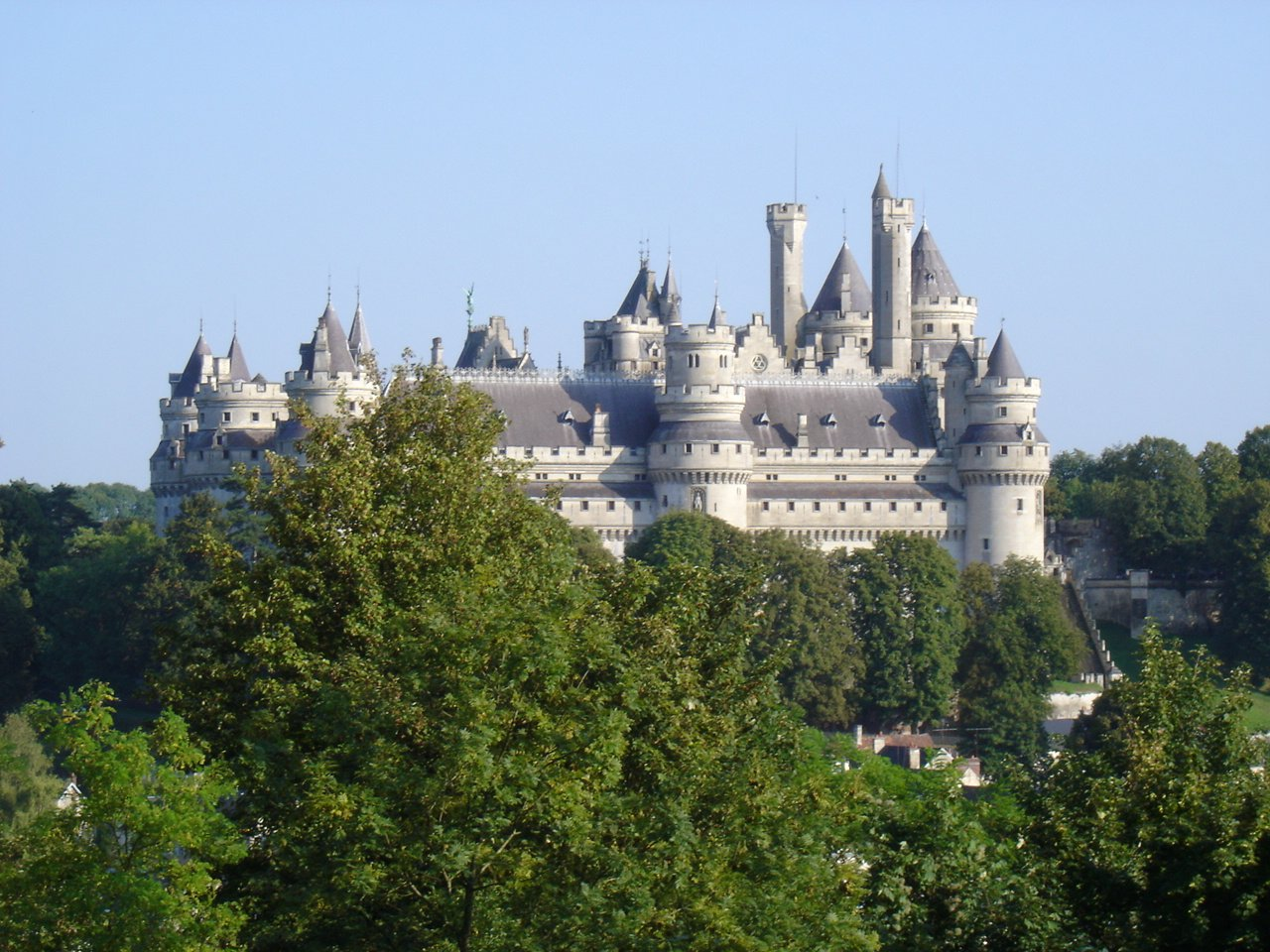
The Château de Pierrefonds in northern France was used for filming Camelot scenes

The programme was conceived by Julian Murphy and Johnny Capps. The BBC had been keen on showing a drama based on the character of Merlin for some time. A year before the Shine series was initiated, writer and producer Chris Chibnall had been developing a project aimed at a BBC One Sunday night slot, but this was ultimately not commissioned. The Shine version of the project was put into development in late 2006, commissioned by Controller of BBC One Peter Fincham and BBC Head of Fiction Jane Tranter, with Fincham keen on having more series on his channel which embodied "three generation TV – that's TV you can watch with your grandparents and children. There's not enough of that about."

The series went into production in March 2008, with filming in Wales and France (at the Château de Pierrefonds). Two Kent locations were also used: The Barons Hall and Garden Tower at Penshurst Place, and Chislehurst Caves for the first series. The series was produced by Shine in association with BBC Wales, whose Head of Drama Julie Gardner was executive producer for the BBC. Doctor Who's chief writer Russell T Davies had been an important influence on the tone and style of Merlin. CGI special effects for the series were provided by Colin Gorry Effects and The Mill. The Old English for spells was written by university scholar and medievalist Dr. Mark Faulkner, and later by the script editing team.

Capps and Murphy confirmed on 24 July 2011 that BBC had commissioned a fifth series. Filming for the fifth series began March 2012 in Pierrefonds, France and near Cardiff, Wales. 13 episodes were ordered. On 26 November 2012, it was announced that series 5 of Merlin would be the last, with a two-part special concluding the series over Christmas.

In later interviews the co-creators said that while there had not been serious consideration of a sixth series, there had been "advanced talks" about a trilogy of Merlin movies set within the show's original timeline that did not end up being realized, but that they remained creatively interested in the legend. Two of the show's original scripts were published on a BBC website aimed at scriptwriters.

== Broadcast ==
An initial series of 13 episodes, Merlin began broadcasting in the UK on 20 September 2008. A trailer was prepared in advance for television, cinemas, and online. On 19 September 2009, series 2 began airing on BBC One. On 5 September 2010, BFI Southbank in London previewed Episodes 1 and 2 of series 3 for its September Film Funday programme. A ten-episode fourth series was confirmed on 2 October 2010, though it was rumoured to air in early 2012, later than its usual slot in autumn, so that it would not clash with Doctor Who which would possibly air during the same period. In March 2011, this was revised, and the fourth series was extended to the standard 13 episodes. Series 5 started broadcasting on 6 October 2012.

A documentary series called Merlin: Secrets and Magic explains how the series was created. Apart from the initial 50-minute special, which was broadcast directly after the series two premiere, all new 50-minute episodes were shown after each Merlin episode repeat on Saturday, Sunday, Monday, or Friday evening on BBC Three. In 2009 the BBC broadcast a special in which Morgan and James took a road trip through Wales looking for traces of sites related to Arthurian legend. James said in an interview that while the road trip was fun, it was geographically limited due to being funded by BBC Wales, even though many high-profile sites related to Arthurian legend are outside Wales.

In April 2008, United States broadcasting rights were purchased by NBC, where it was shown on Sundays at 8 pm (EST), starting on 21 June 2009. This made it the first British drama in over 30 years to be shown on US network television, as opposed to PBS or cable. The programme moved to Syfy, a cable channel also owned by NBC, for the second series, beginning on 2 April 2010, and for the following series in subsequent years, including the final series in 2013. The distributor, FremantleMedia Enterprises, also sold broadcast rights to CTV in Canada, Network Ten in Australia and Prime in New Zealand. It aired on Choice TV. The series was broadcast in 183 countries.

In the UK, the show has reaired on Sky Mix and Sky Sci-Fi, in addition to being available on BBC iPlayer. The free streaming service Plex launched a Merlin channel in 2023 for U.S. viewers, in addition to a separate Merlin channel airing on Amazon Prime's Freevee. In the U.S., the show has also been available on a variety of on-demand paid and free ad-supported streaming platforms, including Pluto TV, Tubi, Amazon's Prime Video Hulu and Britbox.

== Home media ==
Series one and two were released on DVD in the United Kingdom, the United States, and Australia. Series three is available in the United Kingdom and was released in Australia on 4 August 2011. Accompanying box sets are featurettes, video diaries, and commentaries. "Behind the Magic", a two-part overview of making Merlin is included with the UK series one box set, while the documentary series, Merlin: Secrets and Magic, is included with series two. In Australia, "The Complete Collection" boxset (23-Discs, Seasons 1–5) was released on 13 May 2015.

Series	UK						US Complete Box Set		Australia Complete Box Set	
Series	Volume 1		Volume 2		Complete Box Set		US Complete Box Set		Australia Complete Box Set	
Series	Release date	Discs	Release date	Discs	Release date	Discs	Release date	Discs	Release date	Discs
1st	24 November 2008	3	9 February 2009	3	5 October 2009	6	20 April 2010	6	30 July 2009 (Note: Re-released 4 August 2010.)	4
2nd	23 November 2009	3	8 February 2010	3	8 February 2010	6	18 January 2011	6	22 July 2010 (Note: Re-released 6 January 2011.)	4
3rd	15 November 2010	3	24 January 2011	3	24 January 2011	5	17 January 2012	5	2 August 2011	5
4th	28 November 2011	3	23 January 2012	3	23 January 2012	5	15 January 2013	4	1 March 2012	5
5th	26 November 2012	3	21 January 2013	3	21 January 2013	5	23 April 2013	4	13 February 2013	5
1st–5th	—	—	—	—	28 October 2013	27	4 November 2014	27	?	?

The show also had several Blu-ray releases. Series four came out on 15 January 2013, series five came out on 23 April 2013, and the complete series came out on 4 November 2014. Series one, two, and three did not get individual releases on Blu-ray.

== Soundtrack ==
A soundtrack for the first two series featuring music from selected episodes was released on the MovieScore Media record label. Merlin composer Robert Lane was nominated for Best Original Score for Television for the 10th annual Movie Music UK Awards (2008), the 8th edition GoldSpirit Awards (2008), and the 5th annual International Film Music Critics Association (IFMCA) Awards (2008). In early October 2012, MovieScore Media released the soundtrack from the third and fourth series along with that from the start of the fifth series.

Series	Release date	Catalog number
Merlin series 1	4 November 2008	MMS08021
Merlin series 2	17 November 2009	MMS09027
Merlin series 3	2 October 2012 (digital) / 23 October 2012 (CD)	MMS12010
Merlin series 4	2 October 2012 (digital) / 23 October 2012 (CD)	MMS12011

== In other media ==
=== Books ===
A series of books was published including novelizations of episodes from Seasons 1, 2 and 3.

=== Official magazine ===
British publisher Attic Brand Media launched an official magazine for the show in September 2011 featuring articles, puzzles and a comic strip written by Damian Kelleher and drawn by Lee Carey. The monthly magazine cost £3.20 per issue and was distributed in British newsagents.

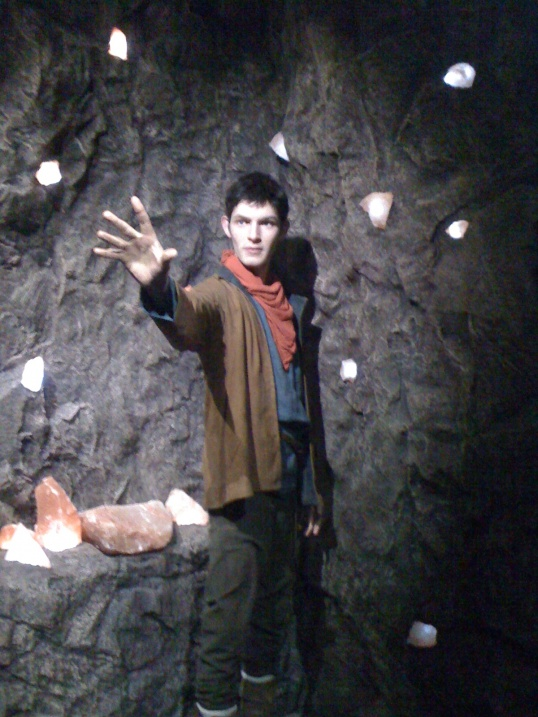
Merlin wax work at Warwick Castle

=== Exhibitions ===
==== Merlin: The Dragon Tower ====
A Merlin attraction was created at Warwick Castle entitled Merlin: The Dragon Tower, which featured a walkthrough, a projection of Kilgharrah the dragon, Merlin from the BBC TV Series Merlin, or at least a true-to-life wax model — which was created with over 300 measurements — and a catalogue of reference shots of Colin Morgan. Upon seeing his wax work, Morgan said, "Little did I think that when I visited Madame Tussauds as a kid that I would have the honour of having the same fantastic team making a wax figure of myself. It's truly amazing and I can't praise their hard work enough in creating such a brilliant life-like me."

The wax model cost £150,000, and the entire castle experience was part of a £3 million investment by the Merlin Entertainment Group to promote the show. The attraction closed in 2014 and is now the site of the Warwick Castle Time Tower.

=== Games ===
The BBC released two small Merlin-themed video games on the BBC website: a tower defense game called 'Camelot Defence', and an adventure puzzle game named 'Quest for the Mortaeus'. In 2012, a 'real-time cooperative' video game adaptation named 'Merlin: The Game' was announced and launched on Facebook. It has since been taken offline.

== Awards and nominations ==
Year	Award	Category	Nominee(s)	Result	Ref.
2009	IFMCA	Best Original Score for a Television Series	Merlin	Nominated	
2009	British Academy Film Awards	Best Interactivity	Merlin	Nominated	
2009	Monte-Carlo Television Festival	Outstanding Actor	Colin Morgan	Nominated	
2009	Monte-Carlo Television Festival	Outstanding Actress	Katie McGrath	Nominated	
2009	7th Visual Effects Society Awards	Outstanding Matte Paintings in a Broadcast Program or Commercial	Merlin	Nominated	
2009	TV Quick Awards	Best New Drama	Merlin	Won	
2010	TV Quick Awards	Best Family Drama	Merlin	Nominated	
2010	British Academy Film Awards	Best Visual Effects	Merlin	Nominated	
2010	British Academy Film Awards	Best Design	Merlin	Nominated	
2010	British Academy Film Awards	Best Director	Merlin	Nominated	
2010	Monte-Carlo Television Festival	Outstanding Actress	Angel Coulby	Nominated	
2010	Monte-Carlo Television Festival	Outstanding Actor	Colin Morgan	Nominated	
2010	Monte-Carlo Television Festival	Outstanding Actor	Bradley James	Nominated	
2011	British Academy Film Awards	Best Visual Effects	Merlin	Won	
2011	Monte-Carlo Television Festival	Outstanding Actor	Colin Morgan	Nominated	
2011	Monte-Carlo Television Festival	Outstanding Actress	Katie McGrath	Nominated	
2011	TV Quick Awards	Best Actor	Colin Morgan	Nominated	
2011	TV Quick Awards	Best Family Drama	Merlin	Nominated	
2012	National Television Awards	Most Popular Drama Series	Merlin	Nominated	
2012	Royal Television Society	Best Sound	Merlin	Nominated	
2012	TRIC Awards	TV Drama Programme of the Year	Merlin	Nominated	
2012	TV Quick Awards	Best Actor	Colin Morgan	Nominated	
2012	TV Quick Awards	Best Family Drama	Merlin	Nominated	
2013	SFX Awards	Best Actor	Colin Morgan	Won	
2013	SFX Awards	Best Actress	Katie McGrath	Nominated	
2013	Academy of Science Fiction, Fantasy & Horror Films	Best Youth-Oriented Series on Television	Merlin	Nominated	
2013	National Television Awards	Most Popular Male Drama Performance	Colin Morgan	Won	
2013	National Television Awards	Most Popular Drama	Merlin	Nominated	
2015	Academy of Science Fiction, Fantasy & Horror Films	Best DVD/Blu-Ray Television Release For "The Complete Series"	Merlin	Nominated	
