= Angel Coulby =

English actress (born 1980)

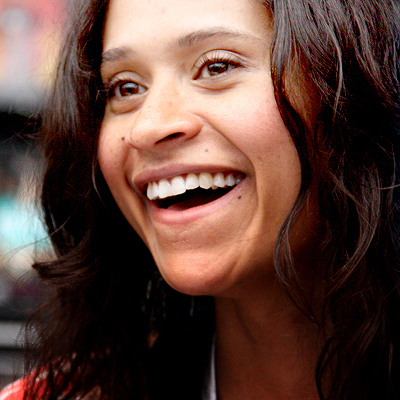
- Coulby in 2011
- Born: Angel Leonie Coulby; 30 August 1980 (age 46); Islington, London, England
- Education: Queen Margaret University
- Occupation: Actress
- Years active: 2001–present
- Children: 1

Angel Leonie Coulby (born 30 August 1980) is an English actress. She gained recognition for portraying the character Gwen (Guinevere) in the BBC fantasy series Merlin.

== Early life ==
Coulby was born and grew up in Finsbury Park, London, and is of Afro-Guyanese descent. She studied for a degree in Acting at the Queen Margaret University School of Drama in Edinburgh, achieving a first, and was awarded the Laurence Olivier Bursary in 2000.

== Career ==
Coulby was first seen in an episode of Scariest Places on Earth as a student who had an encounter with a ghost. Her breakthrough came in 2001 with her role in the Johnny Vaughan BBC sitcom 'Orrible.

She was later chosen to play Gwen, also known as Guinevere who would later become Queen, in the BBC One fantasy TV series Merlin. In an interview with the Los Angeles Times, Coulby stated that in playing Gwen she "liked the idea that you go on a bit of a journey as an actor, starting off as a humble maidservant, kind of a bit bumbling, and then obviously growing into this very capable queen", and it was "really nice to have that range throughout a job". She starred in all five seasons, appearing in 61 of the 65 episodes.

She took the starring role of the jazz singer Jessie in the BBC Two Stephen Poliakoff six-part 2013 drama serial Dancing on the Edge, alongside Chiwetel Ejiofor, Wunmi Mosaku, John Goodman, Matthew Goode, Anthony Head, and Jacqueline Bisset.

It was announced in February 2013 that Coulby would star in The Tunnel, a British-French remake of the Scandinavian crime drama, The Bridge, alongside Stephen Dillane and Clémence Poésy. The first series aired in late 2013, and Coulby reprised her role for a second series in 2016.

Coulby returned to the stage for the first time since 2014 in Rupert Goold's Albion at the Almeida Theatre in February 2020, which was filmed and broadcast on BBC Four in August 2020.

Coulby joined the cast of the Apple TV+ thriller Suspicion, which is a remake of the Hebrew-language series False Flag in March 2020. Coulby plays Vanessa Okoye, the investigator questioning the "five Brits, quickly pinpointed as the potential suspects" of the kidnapping in the thriller.

In June 2021, it was announced that Coulby would star in the series, The Net, as the character Diana. The Austrian football drama aired in November 2022 in conjunction with the 2022 FIFA World Cup.

In November 2021 it was announced she would be in the Hampstead Theatre production of The Forest by Florian Zeller in 2022. She plays the mistress, Sophie, of the protagonist, Pierre.

In October 2025, she starred in a BBC One Drama called Riot Women as Jenny Lennox, which will return for a second season in 2026.

== Personal life ==
Coulby has a son, who was born in 2018.

== TV Shows ==
Year	Title	Role	Notes
2001	'Orrible	Shiv	4 episodes
2001	Scariest Places on Earth	Awassa Tact (scared student), name intended as wordplay on "I was attacked"	Episode: "Exorcism: Greyfriars Cemetery 1"
2002	Casualty	Sally	Episode: "In the Heat of the Night"
2002	Having It Off	Kylie Riley	TV series
2002	A Good Thief	Leah Pickering	TV movie
2003	The Second Coming	PC Louise Fraser	TV miniseries
2003	Manchild	Pippa	1 episode
2004	Making Waves	LMA Anita Cook	2 episodes
2004	As If	Amber	7 episodes
2004	Conviction	Jemma Ryan	6 episodes
2004	Holby City	Maxine Framley	Episode: "A Good Day to Bury Bad News"
2005	The Jacket	Intern No. 2	
2005	Murder Investigation Team	Lee Allanson	1 episode
2005	The League of Gentlemen's Apocalypse	Receptionist	
2005	Imagine Me & You	Anna	
2005	Vincent	Gillian Lafferty	7 episodes
2006	Hustle	Alice	Episode: "A Bollywood Dream"
2006	Doctor Who	Katherine	Episode: "The Girl in the Fireplace"
2006	The Bill	Zoe Hughes	Episode: "Good for Gold"
2006	Tripping Over	Charity	1 episode
2007	Blue Murder	Kate Malin'	Episode: "Crisis Management"
2007	Magicians	Receptionist	
2007	Gina's Laughing Gear	Nurse Jones	Episode: "Dollby City"
2007	Secret Life	Young Mum	TV movie
2007	New Street Law	Sharon Weir	1 episode
2007	Talk to Me	Faith	4 episodes
2007	The Visit	Rachael	6 episodes
2007	Life Is Wild		Episode: "Heritage Day"
2008–2012	Merlin	Guinevere "Gwen"	Main role; 61 episodes
2013	Dancing on the Edge	Jessie Taylor	Main role
2013–2018	The Tunnel	Laura Roebuck	Main role; 21 episodes
2015–2020	Thunderbirds Are Go	Tanusha "Kayo" Kyrano	Main role; voice
2016	Undercover	Julia Redhead	2 episodes
2016	Hooten & the Lady	Melina	Episode: "Egypt"
2017	Man in an Orange Shirt	Claudie	1 episode
2017	Body Slam	Ruth	Short movie
2018	Innocent	Detective Inspector Cathy Hudson	Main role; 4 episodes
2020	Moving On	Lisa	Episode: "Time Out"
2022	Suspicion	Vanessa Okoye	Main role; 8 episodes
2022	The Net: Prometheus	Diana	TV series
2025	What It Feels Like for A Girl	Maggie	TV series
2025	Riot Women	Jenny	TV series
2026	War	Gillian Pope	TV series

== Theatre ==
Year	Title	Role	Director	Company	Notes
2002	Lavender Blue	Jess	Muriel Romanes	Royal Lyceum Theatre	
2007	Statement of Regret	Issimama Banjoko	Jeremy Herrin	Cottesloe Theatre	
2014	Good People	Katie	Jonathan Kent	Hampstead Theatre / Noël Coward Theatre	
2020	Albion	Anna	Rupert Goold	Almeida Theatre	
2022	The Forest	Sophie	Jonathan Kent	Hampstead Theatre	

== Awards and nominations ==
Year	Award	Category	Role	Result
2010	Monte Carlo TV Festival Awards	Golden Nymph Outstanding Actress – Drama Series	Gwen in Merlin	Nominated
