= Bradley James =

English actor

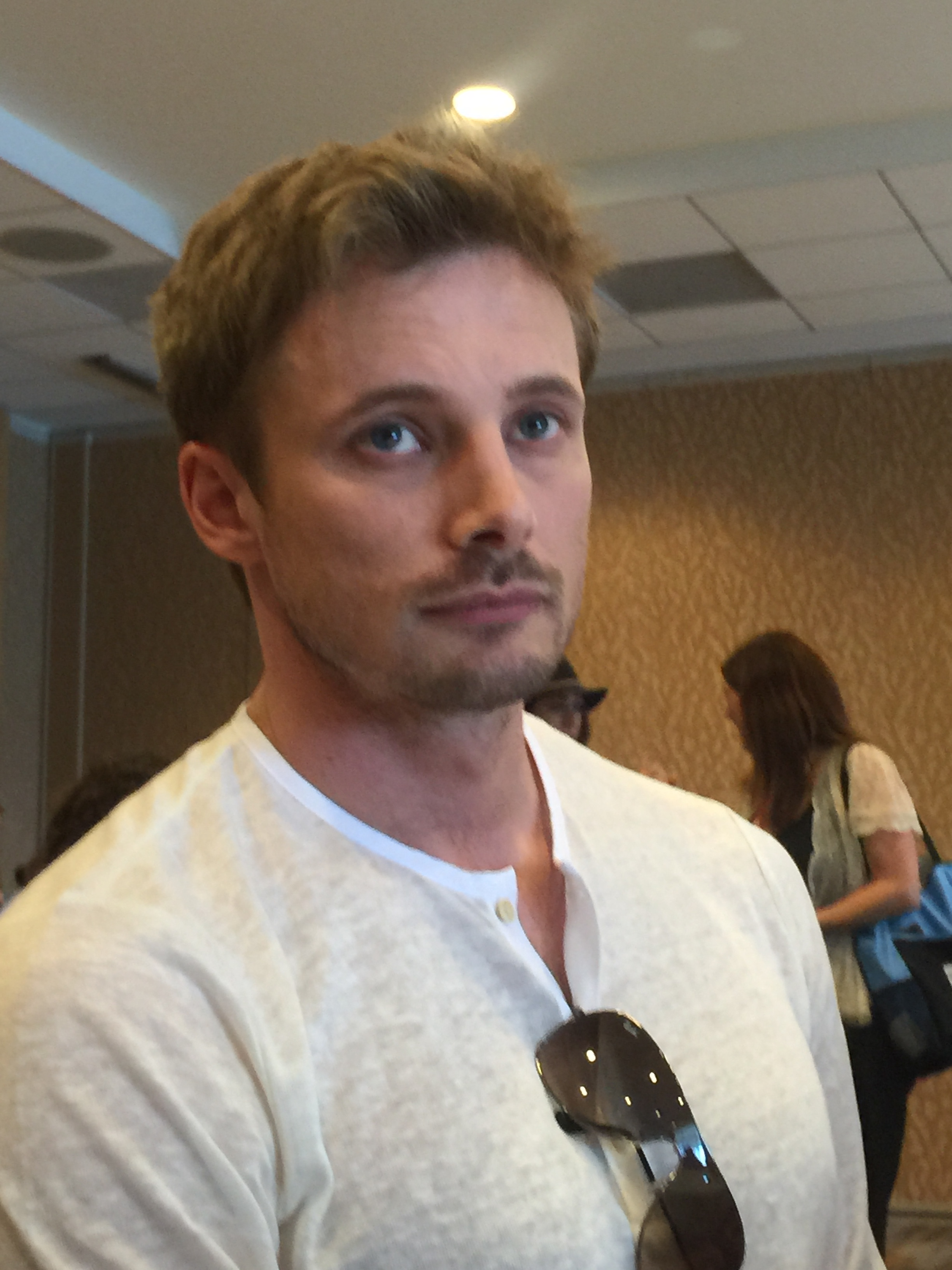
- James at the 2015 Comic-Con International
- Born: 1983 or 1984 (age 42–43); Exeter, Devon, England
- Education: Drama Centre London (BA)
- Occupation: Actor
- Years active: 2008–present

Bradley James (born 1983 or 1984) is an English actor. He is best known for starring as Arthur Pendragon in the BBC series Merlin (2008–12), Damien Thorn in Damien (2016), Varga in Underworld: Blood Wars, Giuliano de' Medici in Medici: The Magnificent (2018–2020), and Lieutenant Colonel Felix Sparks in The Liberator (2020).

== Early life and education ==
James was born in Exeter, Devon, England. He became interested in acting at the age of six, whilst in primary school. His family moved to Jacksonville, Florida when he was nine. During his time there, he attended Crown Point Elementary School and then Fletcher Middle School, before returning to England to go to Madeley High School in Madeley, Staffordshire, England. From 2004 to 2007 James attended Drama Centre London, graduating after three years.

== Career ==
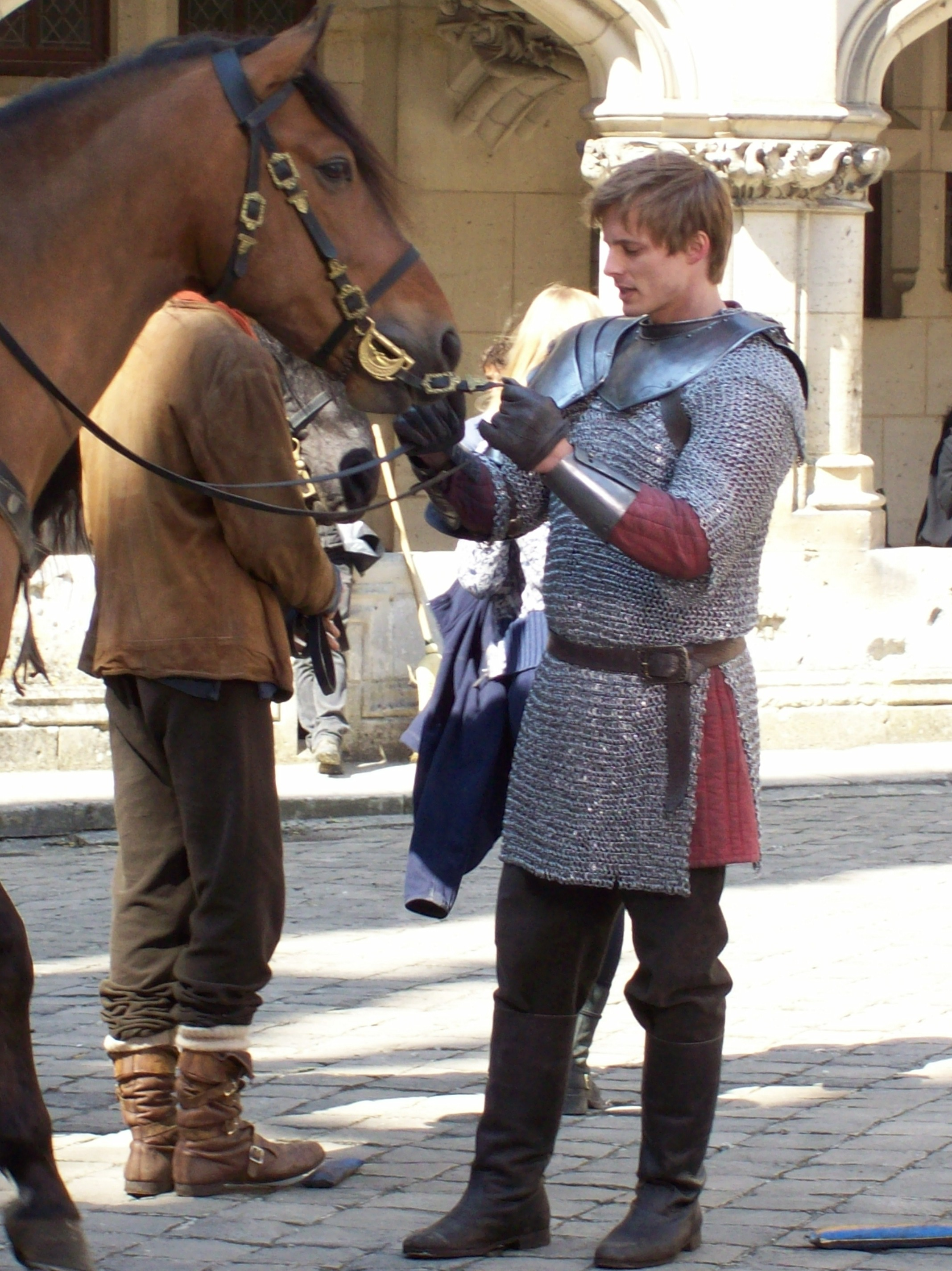
James on the set of Merlin April 2010

In 2008, James appeared in an episode of Lewis, then played Ben Davis in the BBC Three comedy-drama film Dis/Connected. The same year he was cast as Arthur Pendragon in the BBC One fantasy TV series Merlin. The show was a consistent hit series in the US; its first season was shown on the broadcast network NBC and its second, third, fourth, and fifth seasons on NBC's affiliate cable network Syfy. Merlin ended its 5-year run in 2012. James presented a documentary about Arthurian legends for BBC Wales, The Real Merlin & Arthur, in 2009.

In 2014, James guest starred as Edgar in the fourth season of the Emmy Award-winning political thriller television series Homeland.

In 2015, James was cast as a villain in Underworld: Blood Wars and appeared in the television series iZombie as recurring character Lowell Tracey, a love interest for main character Liv. He starred as title character Damien Thorn in the television series Damien, created by Glen Mazzara as a sequel to the Omen film series.

In 2018, James was cast as Giuliano de' Medici in Medici: The Magnificent, a series which follows the fortunes of the Medici family, who were bankers to the Pope during Renaissance-era Florence. He co-starred with Daniel Sharman who played Guiliano's brother Lorenzo de' Medici.

In 2020, James played the American war hero Felix Sparks in The Liberator, Netflix's four-part World War II drama series based on the book by Alex Kershaw. This was the first project produced in Trioscope, a new enhanced hybrid technology that combines state-of-the-art CGI with live-action performance.

In 2023, he starred as Norwegian farmer and chieftain Harekr in the second season of the Netflix historical drama Vikings: Valhalla, created by Jeb Stuart as a sequel to History's Vikings. It was filmed in County Wicklow, Ireland.

It was reported in May 2025 that James would co-star as Wolf-Heinrich Graf von Helldorff in a historical film based on Kristallnacht that is being filmed in Vienna, Austria.

== Personal life ==
James has two sisters, Natalie and Stephanie. He is a supporter of Arsenal F.C. and a keen footballer who regularly plays charity matches. He is also a fan of the Miami Dolphins of the American Football Conference.

== Filmography ==
=== Film ===
Year	Title	Role	Note
2012	Fast Girls	Carl	
2016	Underworld: Blood Wars	Varga	
2019	Kurier	Tom Dunbar	
2025	The Fallow Few	Cpl. George Hansen	

=== Television ===
Year	Title	Role	Notes
2008	Lewis	Jack Roth	"Music to Die For"
2008	Dis/Connected	Ben	TV film
2008–2012	Merlin	Arthur Pendragon	Main role - 65 episodes
2009	Children in Need	Arthur Pendragon	"1.30"
2014	Homeland	J.G. Edgars	Episode: "The Drone Queen"
2015	iZombie	Lowell Tracey	Recurring role - 5 episodes
2016	Damien	Damien Thorn	Lead role- 10 episodes
2017–2019	Bounty Hunters	Webb Sherman, Keegan Sherman	Main role - 5 episodes
2018–2019	Medici: Masters of Florence	Giuliano de' Medici	Main role - 11 episodes
2020	The Liberator	Felix Sparks	Lead role - all 4 episodes
2023	Vikings: Valhalla	Harekr	Season 2 - 5 Episodes
