= Colin Morgan =

Irish actor (born 1986)

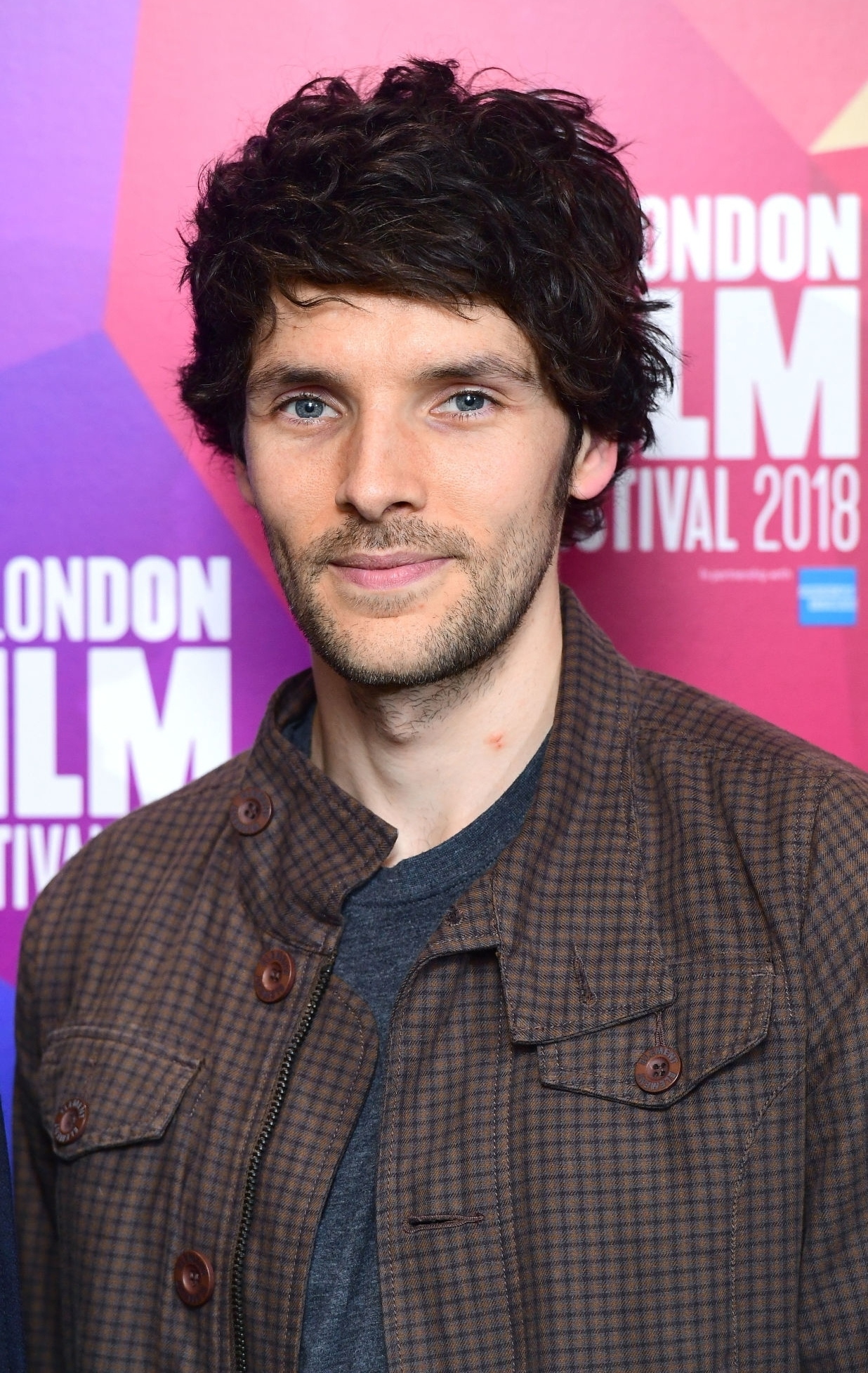
- Morgan in 2018
- Born: 1 January 1986 (age 40); Armagh, Northern Ireland
- Education: Integrated College Dungannon; Belfast Institute for Further and Higher Education; Royal Scottish Academy of Music and Drama
- Occupation: Actor
- Years active: 2007–present

Colin Morgan (born 1 January 1986) is a Northern Irish actor. He is known for playing the title character in the BBC fantasy series Merlin (2008–2012), Leo Elster in Humans (2015–2018), and Billy Clanton in Kenneth Branagh's Belfast (2021).

Morgan made his London theatre debut in 2007 as the title character in DBC Pierre's Vernon God Little. He went on to appear in the theatre productions Pedro Almodóvar's Todo sobre mi madre ("All About My Mother") in 2007, Thomas Babe's A Prayer for My Daughter in 2008, Pedro Miguel Rozo's Our Private Life in 2011, Step in Time at The Old Vic 24 Hour Musicals Celebrity Gala in 2012, Shakespeare's The Tempest in 2013, and Jez Butterworth's Mojo during 2013 and 2014.

In July 2008, Screen International named Morgan as a "Star of Tomorrow". For his performance in Merlin, Morgan was nominated for Outstanding Actor (Drama) in the Monte Carlo TV Festival Awards in 2009, 2010, and 2011, and Best Actor in Drama Performance: Male in the National Television Awards in 2013.

== Early life and education ==
Morgan was born on 1 January 1986 in Armagh, Northern Ireland, the son of Bernard, a painter and decorator, and Bernadette, a nurse. He is the younger of two brothers; they were both raised Roman Catholic.

In 1997, Morgan began studies at Integrated College Dungannon. Morgan starred in several college productions including Surgical Sensations at St. Senapods and Bad Day at Black Frog Creek.

Morgan was awarded a National Diploma in Performing Arts from the Belfast Institute of Further and Higher Education in 2004. He graduated from the Royal Scottish Academy of Music and Drama in 2007. During his undergraduate course, he was discovered by theatre director Rufus Norris and left three-quarters of the way through his final year to make his London West End theatre debut as the title character in Vernon God Little. Morgan's performance was well received and used as part of his assessment for his final grade.

In November 2010, the Belfast Metropolitan College honoured Morgan with an Award of Distinction for his contribution to the Arts.

== Career ==
=== Theatre ===
Morgan made his stage debut in London as the titular character Vernon God Little mounted at the Young Vic in 2007. The Telegraph said that Morgan "captures all the vulnerability, confusion and gallows humour of the adolescent hero who finds himself in no end of trouble". That same year, Morgan played the role of Esteban, an aspiring teenage writer, in the Old Vic stage adaptation of Pedro Almodóvar's All About My Mother. For both of these roles, Morgan was nominated for the 2007 London Newcomer of the Year in the Whatsonstage.com Theatregoers' Choice Awards.

In 2008, Morgan appeared in the Young Vic production of Thomas Babe's A Prayer for My Daughter. The Independent noted Morgan brought Jimmy to life through "twisting, twitching mood-swings and mix of half-druggy cackling punk and half-angelic visionary." Variety also singled out his "remarkable level of twitchy intensity."

In 2011, Morgan performed in the Royal Court Theatre production of Pedro Miguel Rozo's play Our Private Life to favourable reviews as Carlos, a "bipolar compulsive fantasist" homosexual who suspects he was molested by his father as a child. On 9 December 2012, Morgan performed the role of Gary, a flamboyant dance instructor trying to win the heart of one of his students, in Step in Time at The Old Vic 24 Hour Musicals Celebrity Gala in aid of The Old Vic Trust.

He played Ariel in the 2013 Globe Theatre production of The Tempest, which was later broadcast to cinemas as part of Globe On Screen in May 2014, with a subsequent DVD release in July 2014 and then was also later released online via the Globe's online platform in 2022. For this role, Morgan sought to imbue his portrayal of Ariel with "ethereal stillness" and "acrobatic precision". The Washington Post critic said that he "can't remember a better Ariel," and that Morgan's portrayal was "mysterious, in a way I've never quite experienced before – also wonderfully vulnerable".

From 2013 to 2014, Morgan played Skinny Luke in Jez Butterworth's dark comedy Mojo at the Harold Pinter Theatre. Radio Times described Morgan's performance as "an accomplished study in human weakness ... played with precision and pathos." In 2017, Morgan returned to London theatre, appearing in Branden Jacobs-Jenkins' Gloria, a comic drama. Morgan made his National Theatre debut in May 2018, starring in the new production of Brian Friel's Translations, directed by Ian Rickson.

In 2019, he appeared in Arthur Miller's All My Sons at the Old Vic as Chris Keller, a production that was screened in cinemas and later made available through the National Theatre's online streaming platform in 2021.

He performed at the Bridge Theatre in early 2020, for Caryl Churchill's A Number.

=== Television ===
==== 2007–2008: early years ====
In television, Morgan first appeared in 2007 as the embarrassed gay son John Leary in sketches on The Catherine Tate Show's "Christmas Special." In 2008, he portrayed the conflicted teenager Jethro Cane in the fan-favourite Doctor Who episode "Midnight".

==== 2008–2012: Merlin ====
Morgan played the title role in BBC TV series Merlin from 2008 to 2012. The series chronicles the adventures of a young warlock who serves as Arthur's servant and Gaius' ward; Merlin must secretly develop his magical gifts under the gaze of Kings Uther and Arthur, both of whom despise the art.

The show was loosely based on the Arthurian legends of Merlin and his relationship with King Arthur. Morgan was nominated for and won multiple acting awards, including the Caron Keating Outstanding Newcomer Award in the 56th annual Variety Club Showbiz Award ceremony on 16 November 2008 (at the start of the series) and the Best Actor in Drama Performance: Male award in the 2013 National Television Awards (at the conclusion of the series).

The role of Merlin proved difficult to cast, according to co-creator and executive producer Johnny Capps. "We had to find an actor who has a broad playing range, someone with the lightness of touch who will be able to deal with action and magic", Capps said in a 2011 interview. "We had an instinct about Colin. At first we weren't sure about him but then saw him again and again and we watched back his final auditions and said, 'He's perfect for the part.'" Before auditioning for the role, Morgan received the script for Prince Arthur by mistake. He only had five minutes before his audition to read over the correct part.

==== 2014–present ====
After spending 2013 in back-to-back stage productions, Morgan reappeared on television as an ambitious journalist in an episode of the 1950s Irish crime drama Quirke, based on the books by John Banville.

Later that year, he took on the role of detective sergeant in the second series of The Fall. Morgan was approached to play the role, meeting with writer Allan Cubitt and lead actress Gillian Anderson in London to discuss his involvement. To prepare for his performance, Morgan read up on police procedures and spoke to the set's police advisor. He also did an impromptu interview of two police officers he saw in the street in London.

In June 2015, Morgan began his role as the mysterious fugitive Leo Elster in Humans, a British-American AMC / Channel 4 eight-part science fiction drama. Humans was Channel 4's highest-rated drama since The Camomile Lawn (1992). Reviewer Paul Simpson described Morgan as one who "always rises to strong material, and [whose] performance has become increasingly engaging as the series has progressed".

In mid-2016, Morgan starred in the BBC One Victorian era ghost hunter series The Living and the Dead as the central character Nathan Appleby. Later that year, he reprised his roles in The Fall's third series and in the second series of Humans.

In 2026, Morgan joined the second series of the Paramount+ crime drama MobLand, playing Kelly "Mad Dog" O'Connor, who was introduced in the eighth episode, "We Don't Talk Anymore". The character is the son of Colm "Medusa" O'Connor and seeks revenge against Eddie and Gina following his father's death.

=== Film ===
Morgan portrayed a homeless drug-addict in the 2010 independent Irish film Parked, for which he spent several weeks in Dublin researching drug addiction and homelessness. Morgan's performance was praised by multiple critics and director Darragh Byrne.

In 2011, Morgan appeared in the film Island, an independent adaptation of Jane Rogers' novel Island.

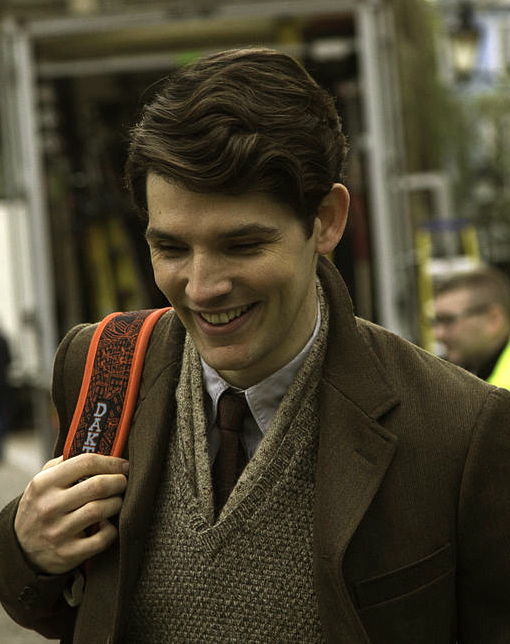
Morgan on the set of Testament of Youth, Oxford, England, 9 April 2014

Morgan next portrayed WWI British soldier Victor Richardson, in a BBC Films and Heyday Films feature adaptation of Vera Brittain's World War I memoir Testament of Youth. To prepare for the role of the soldier, Morgan read Brittain's works, as well as personal letters exchanged between Vera, Victor, and their friends. He also contacted a Blind Veterans Charity in Brighton, which allowed him to interview blind people. The British Film Institute's brochure said, "Shining brightly and lingering long in the mind afterwards, are the performances of three rising British stars – Colin Morgan, Taron Egerton and Kit Harington".

In the fourth quarter of 2015, Morgan was featured as Frankie Shea, brother-in-law and personal driver of lead character Reggie Kray, in the 1960s London gangster film Legend.

For two days in Blackpool, from 9 to 10 May 2015, Morgan filmed The Laughing King, a short film by White No Sugar TV and Funky Films in support of the UK charity Campaign Against Living Miserably's (CALM) push to raise awareness regarding depression, mental illness and male suicide. He played the role of Jake, a young man who arrives in Blackpool, the seaside town of his childhood, determined to end his life. It was released on 12 January 2016, in the London Short Film Festival.

In 2015, he was attached to play the lead role of Seán Mac Diarmada in a planned film about the 1916 Easter Rising in Ireland. In 2020, the film producer said he was still seeking additional financing for the project.

Morgan filmed Waiting for You from May to June 2015. In April 2016, Morgan portrayed the Duke of Blackwood in the Snow White and the Huntsman spin-off, The Huntsman: Winter's War. In the fourth quarter of 2016, Morgan filmed the Oscar Wilde biopic The Happy Prince in Bavaria, Germany. In mid-2017, Morgan played the title role in Benjamin, a film written and directed by Simon Amstell.

In 2021, Morgan appeared in Kenneth Branagh's film Belfast, based on the director's childhood during the Troubles. The film was nominated for the Academy Award for Best Picture. In 2022, he appeared in the film Corsage, which was short-listed for the Academy Award for Best International Feature Film as a submission from Austria. In 2022, he completed filming on Long Day's Journey into Night, an adaptation of Eugene O'Neill's 1956 play. The independent production faced financing challenges.

=== Radio ===
Morgan took part in BBC Radio play Cry Babies by Kim Newman on BBC Radio 4 in March 2009, playing the part of Roger. In December 2014, he starred as Newton Pulsifer in the first audio dramatisation of the popular book Good Omens, written by Neil Gaiman and Terry Pratchett, and directed and adapted by Dirk Maggs, also on BBC Radio 4.

On 4 December 2016, Morgan read Autumn Journal on BBC Radio 3, which was about Louis MacNeice's poetic testament of life in 1938, written against the turbulent backdrop of the Munich Agreement, the fall of Barcelona and Britain's preparations for an inevitable war.

=== Writing ===
His first novel, The Ballad of Ronan McCoy, was published by HarperCollins UK imprint HQ on 18 June 2026.

=== Narration ===
For the 100th anniversary of the Titanic's sinking on 14 April 2012, Morgan performed readings from survivor accounts and testimonials during Titanic: A Commemoration in Music and Film, broadcast live on BBC2 from Belfast's Waterfront Hall.

On 27 August 2014, Morgan narrated Big Mountain Productions' Addicts Symphony on Channel 4. The one-off documentary followed composer, musician and recovering alcoholic James McConnel as he brought together ten classical musicians whose lives had been blighted by addiction for a spectacular concert.

Since 2018, Morgan has narrated The Chronicles ... series for BBC NI, which takes a year-long look at areas in Northern Ireland. Starting with The Chronicles of Mourne, each episode covers a season in the year, starting with spring and moving to winter. In 2020, The Chronicles of Mourne was followed by The Chronicles of Erne, with The Chronicles of Belfast in 2023. In 2024, the series will expand with The Chronicles of Armagh, detailing Morgan's home county.

=== Video games ===
Morgan voiced Merlin's game sequences in 2012's Merlin: The Game.

== Personal life ==
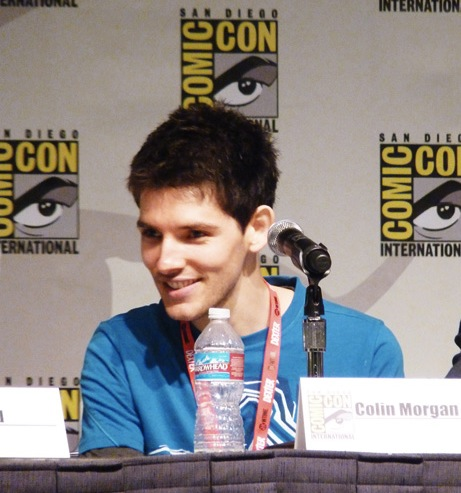
Morgan at the 2010 San Diego Comic-Con

Morgan has advocated ethical consumerism and practises yoga. He is lactose intolerant and vegetarian.

Morgan does not participate in social media, saying: "There's no social media or googling yourself. You only have to do it once to learn never to do it again."

Morgan has also criticised celebrity culture:

Something has been lost somewhere along the way with the craft of story-telling ... When the creativity is overshadowed by the "business" I often feel disappointed by that. We have some amazing filmmakers who are keeping the spirit of the craft alive and that's a hub of excitement I want to be in.

=== Charity and activism ===
From October 2009 until its conclusion in March 2011, Morgan was an ambassador for the A Night Less Ordinary scheme in which Arts Council England offered free theatre tickets to anyone under 26 years old. He contributed a painting from the Merlin: Colin and Bradley Quest series to the 2010 BBC Children in Need auction. It sold for £620.

On 9 April 2011, Morgan collected funds for the Great Ormond Street Hospital. On 9 December 2012, he was a part of the 24 Hour Musicals at the Old Vic Theatre, which brought together more than 30 actors, directors, writers and composers to create four short musicals in just 24 hours. The process culminated in four world premieres presented to an audience of more than 1,000, and raised £182,000 towards the work that the theatre does with emerging talent, schools and the community.

== Acting credits ==
Key
†	Denotes films that have not yet been released

=== Film ===
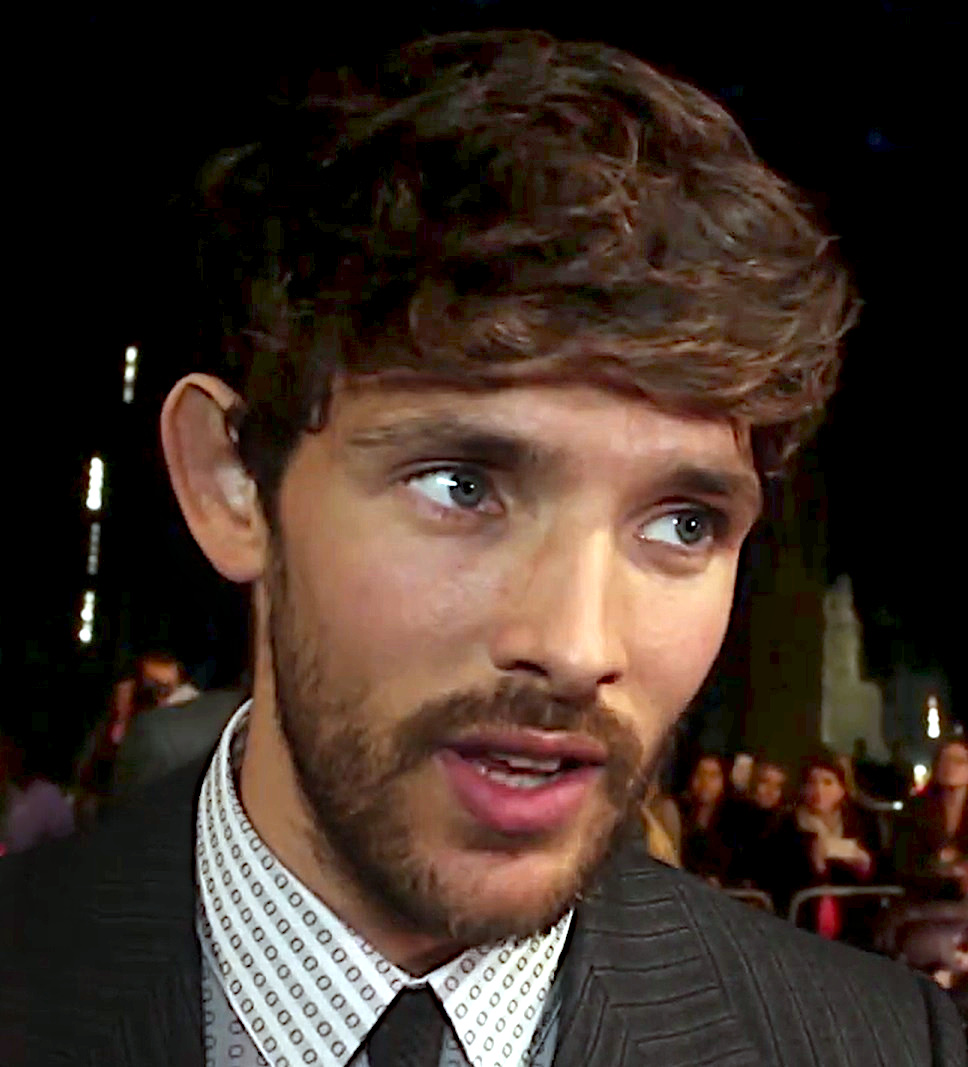
Morgan at Testament of Youth world premiere 2014

Year	Title	Role	Notes
2011	Island	Calum MacLeod	
2011	Parked	Cathal O'Regan	Main role
2014	Testament of Youth	Victor Richardson	
2015	Legend	Frankie Shea	
2016	The Laughing King	Jake	Short film
2016	The Huntsman: Winter's War	Duke of Blackwood	
2017	Waiting for You	Paul Ashton	Main role
2018	The Happy Prince	Lord Alfred "Bosie" Douglas	
2018	Benjamin	Benjamin	Main role
2021	Belfast	Billy Clanton	
2022	Corsage	William George "Bay" Middleton	
2023	Dead Shot	Micheal O'Hara	Main role
2023	The Dead Don't Hurt	Lewis Cartwright	
2025	Long Day's Journey into Night	Edmund Tyrone	
2026	Once Upon a Time in a Cinema	Earl Clancy	
TBA	Heartless †	TBA	Post-production

=== Television ===
Year	Title	Role	Notes
2007	The Catherine Tate Show	John Leary	Episode: "Christmas Special"
2008	Doctor Who	Jethro Cane	Series 4, episode 10: "Midnight"
2008–2012	Merlin	Merlin	Main role
2009	Merlin: Secrets and Magic	Himself	TV documentary; 14 episodes
2009	The Real Merlin and Arthur	Himself	TV documentary
2010	Colin & Bradley's Merlin Quest	Himself	Short
2014	Quirke	Jimmy Minor	Episode 3: "Elegy for April"
2014–2016	The Fall	Tom Anderson	Main role (series 2–3)
2015–2018	Humans	Leo Elster	Main role
2016	The Living and the Dead	Nathan Appleby	Main role
2019	The Crown	John Armstrong	Series 3, episode 4: "Bubbikins"
2021	Three Families	Jonathan Kennedy	2 episodes
2022	We Hunt Together	Liam Gates	Series 2
2022	Mammals	Jeff Wilson	Main role
2023	The Killing Kind	John Webster	Main role
2024	Dead and Buried	Michael McAllister	Main role
2024	The Boy That Never Was	Harry Lonergan	Main role
2025	The Sandman	Sexton Furnival	Episode: "Death: The High Cost of Living"
2026	The Gray House	Hamton Arsenault	8 episodes
2026	Trying	Kerry	
2026	MobLand	Kelly "Mad Dog" O'Connor	Introduced in series 2, episode 8: "We Don't Talk Anymore"
2027	The Emperor's Stone	Theo Levasseur	
2027	Nightsleeper	Stephen 'Bo' Bowen	

=== Theatre ===
Year	Title	Role	Director	Company
2007	Vernon God Little	Vernon Little	Rufus Norris	Young Vic Theatre
2007	All About My Mother	Esteban	Tom Cairns	Old Vic Theatre
2008	A Prayer for My Daughter	Jimmy Rosario	Dominic Hill	Young Vic Theatre
2011	Our Private Life	Carlos	Lyndsey Turner	Royal Court Theatre
2012	The 24 Hour Musicals Celebrity Gala	Gary	Jamie Lloyd	Old Vic Theatre
2013	The Tempest	Ariel	Jeremy Herrin	Shakespeare's Globe
2013–2014	Mojo	Skinny Luke	Ian Rickson	Harold Pinter Theatre
2017	Gloria	Dean/Devin	Michael Longhurst	Hampstead Theatre
2018	Translations	Owen	Ian Rickson	Royal National Theatre
2019	All My Sons	Chris Keller	Jeremy Herrin	Old Vic Theatre
2020	A Number	B1/B2/Michael	Polly Findlay	Bridge Theatre

=== Radio ===
Year	Title	Role	Channel	Notes
2009	Cry Babies	Roger	BBC Radio 4	
2014	Good Omens	Newton Pulsifer	BBC Radio 4	
2016	Autumn Journal	Reader	BBC Radio 3	Poetry
2017	Keeping in Touch	Tom	BBC Radio 4	
2017	The Coming of the Martians	George		
2018	The Merchant of Venice	Bassanio	BBC Radio 3	
2018	Neil Gaiman's Norse Mythology	Loki	BBC Radio 4	
2019	Passenger List	Thomas Rider	Radiotopia	Podcast
2019	A Border Fantasy	Fintan	BBC	
2026	The Bacchae	Bacchus	BBC Radio 4	

=== Narration ===
Year	Title	Role	Channel	Notes
2012	Titanic: A Commemoration in Music and Film	Self	BBC Two	Documentary
2014	Addicts Symphony	Narrator	Channel 4	Documentary with James McConnel
2018	The Chronicles of Mourne	Narrator	BBC One	Documentary
2018	The Vault: Audible Original	Jimmy Walker	Audible	Audiobook
2018	The Worldship Humility	Narrator	Audible	Audiobook
2019	The Young Lion: Birth of the Plantagenets	Narrator	Audible	Audiobook
2020	The Chronicles of Erne	Narrator	BBC One	Documentary
2020	The Lion Rampant: Birth of the Plantagenets	Narrator	Audible	Audiobook
2020	The Lions' Torment: Birth of the Plantagenets	Narrator	Audible	Audiobook
2020	The Lioness Wakes	Narrator	Audible	Audiobook
2021	The Elfor Drop	Narrator	Audible	Audiobook
2021	This Thing of Darkness	Narrator	Audible	Audiobook
2021	Slaine: The Horned God	Narrator (Slaine)	Audible	Audiobook
2021	The Chronicles of the Glens	Narrator	BBC One	Documentary
2022	The Elfor One	Narrator	Audible	Audiobook
2022	Mountain Vets	Narrator	BBC Two	Series 3; documentary
2022	Discworld: the Wizard series	Narrator	Penguin Audio	
2022	The Chronicles of Strangford	Narrator	BBC One	Documentary
2023	The Chronicles of Belfast	Narrator	BBC One	Documentary
2024	The Chronicles of Armagh	Narrator	BBC One	Documentary
2025	The Chronicles of The Sperrins	Narrator	BBC One	Documentary
2026	The Chronicles of Foyle	Narrator	BBC One	Documentary
2026	The Haunted Library	Narrator	BBC Sounds	Audiobook/podcast

=== Video games ===
Year	Title	Role	Notes
2012	Merlin: The Game	Merlin	Voice

=== Other credits ===
Year	Title	Role	Company
2004–2007	Jack and the Beanstalk	Archie	RSAMD
2004–2007	The Caucasian Chalk Circle	Singer (Arkadi Tsheidse)	RSAMD
2004–2007	The Tempest	Ferdinand	RSAMD
2004–2007	Plasticine	Groom/Grandmother	RSAMD
2004–2007	Last Supper	Young Man/Chorus	RSAMD
2004–2007	Vassa	Semyon	RSAMD
2004–2007	God the Game Show	Stewart	RSAMD
2004–2007	Bite of the Night	First Youth / chorus	RSAMD

== Awards and nominations ==
Year	Award	Category	Work	Result
2008	Variety Club Showbiz Awards	Caron Keating Outstanding Newcomer	Merlin	Won
2008	Whatsonstage.com Theatregoers' Choice Awards	London Newcomer of the Year	Vernon God Little; All About My Mother	Nominated
2009	Monte Carlo TV Festival Awards	Outstanding Actor (Drama)	Merlin	Nominated
2009	Seoul International Drama Awards	Best Actor	Merlin	Nominated
2010	Monte Carlo TV Festival Awards	Outstanding Actor (Drama)	Merlin	Nominated
2011	Monte Carlo TV Festival Awards	Outstanding Actor (Drama)	Merlin	Nominated
2011	TV Quick Awards	Best Actor	Merlin	Nominated
2012	TV Quick Awards	Best Actor	Merlin	Nominated
2012	Virgin Media TV Awards	Best Actor	Merlin	Won
2013	Broadway World West End Awards	Best Featured Actor in a New Production of a Play	The Tempest	Won
2013	National Television Awards	Drama Performance: Male	Merlin	Won
2013	SFX Awards	Best Actor	Merlin	Won
2018	Evening Standard Theatre Awards	Best Actor	Translations	Nominated
2020	Laurence Olivier Awards	Best Actor in a Supporting Role	All My Sons	Nominated
2021	Critics' Choice Movie Awards	Critics' Choice Movie Award for Best Acting Ensemble (shared with cast)	Belfast	Won
2021	Actor Awards	Outstanding Performance by a Cast in a Motion Picture (shared with cast)	Belfast	Nominated
