= Batmanghelidj =

Batmanghelidj, Batmanglij or Batmanghelidjh (Persian: باتمانقلیچ, IPA: [bɒːtmɒːŋɢeˈliːdʒ]), is an Iranian surname of Azeri origin, and may refer to:

- Camila Batmanghelidjh (Persian: کامیلا, 1963–2024), a British psychotherapist, social entrepreneur and daughter of Fereydoon (despite the spelling variation)
- Fereydoon Batmanghelidj (Persian: فریدون, 1931–2004), an Iranian writer and naturopath
- Nader Batmanghelidj (1904–1998), Army officer and government official
- Najmieh Batmanglij (Persian: نجمیه, born 1947), an Iranian-American chef and writer and mother to Rostam and Zal
- Rostam Batmanglij (Persian: رستم, born 1983), an American musician and a member of the band Vampire Weekend, who is known mononymously as Rostam
- Zal Batmanglij (Persian: زال, born 1981), an American film director and screenwriter born in France

== See also ==
- Batmanqelenj-e Sofla, a village in Hashtrud County, East Azerbaijan Province, Iran
