= Island (2011 film) =

2011 British film

- Theatrical release poster
- Directed by: Brek Taylor; Elizabeth Mitchell
- Screenplay by: Elizabeth Mitchell
- Story by: Jane Rogers
- Based on: Island by Jane Rogers
- Produced by: Amy Gardner; Clare Tinsley; Charlotte Wontner
- Starring: Natalie Press; Colin Morgan; Janet McTeer
- Cinematography: Rain (Kathy) Li
- Edited by: Sam Sneade
- Music by: Michael Price
- Production company: FilmRise
- Distributed by: Soda Pictures
- Release date: 22 April 2011
- Running time: 102 minutes
- Country: United Kingdom
- Language: English

Island is a 2011 British film and an independent adaptation of the 1999 novel Island by Jane Rogers. The film was directed by Brek Taylor and Elizabeth Mitchell who also wrote the screenplay. It stars Natalie Press, Colin Morgan, and Janet McTeer. It features original music from Michael Price, and cinematography from Rain (Kathy) Li.

== Plot ==
Nikki Black, abandoned at birth, is an unhinged twenty-nine-year-old woman on a vengeful quest to find and kill her birth mother. Shortly after arriving on the remote island of Tigh Na Benne, she discovers a room for rent ad from a Phyllis Lovage, her mother. Once there to rent the room, she quickly learns that she has a brother, Calum MacLeod, a loner, awkward and violent. Her mother, sick with cancer and protective of her son, keeps him on a tight leash and, in short order, attempts to keep the two apart. Nikki and Calum soon develop an unhealthy relationship that ends in tragedy.

== Cast ==
- Natalie Press as Nikki Black
- Colin Morgan as Calum MacLeod
- Janet McTeer as Phyllis Lovage
- Tanya Franks as Ruby
- Kate Stevens as Emma Lacey
- Denise Oritta as Sally
- Alex Donald as Gerry the Barman

== Reception ==
Island received mixed reviews. On the review aggregator website Rotten Tomatoes, 93% of 6 critics' reviews are positive, with an average rating of 5.6/10.. Their top rated critic for the film, Peter Bradshaw of the daily The Guardian called it a "flimsy film", while Derek Malcolm of the tabloid London Evening Standard was critical of directors Brek Taylor and Elizabeth Mitchell. Critic Andrew Lowry of the magazine Total Film, said that Rain (Kathy) Li's cinematography "imbues proceedings with a chilly beauty". The site Best for Film critically reviewed the film as "effortlessly and satisfyingly ambiguous". Unsung Films reviewed the film as "different and unusual", "not keeping entirely faithful to the book", and "unique". The UK independent film review magazine Dog and Wolf gave the film 3 out of 5 stars.

== Production ==
Island was filmed on the Isle of Mull, Argyll, and the Isle of Bute, in Scotland, United Kingdom.

== Release ==
Island had its theatrical debut on 22 April 2011 in the UK and was later made available for viewing on DVD and the video streaming service Amazon Prime.
