= Monty Python: And Now for Something Rather Similar =

- Genre: Documentary
- Directed by: Jack Cocker
- Starring: Alan Yentob; John Cleese; Terry Gilliam; Eric Idle; Terry Jones; Michael Palin
- Country of origin: United Kingdom

Production
- Producers: Jack Cocker; Holly Gilliam
- Cinematography: Jack Cocker
- Editors: Valentine Douglas; Andrew Quigley
- Running time: 72 minutes

Original release
- Network: BBC 1
- Release: 29 June 2014

And Now for Something Rather Similar is a documentary about the Monty Python team as they prepare for their first live performances in 34 years. Airing on BBC One on 29 June 2014 as part of the Imagine series, the programme is presented by Alan Yentob, who tracks down the five surviving Pythons in the months leading up to their Monty Python Live (Mostly) shows at the O_{2} arena in July 2014.

Following the press conference announcing the shows and the team’s subsequent appearance on The Graham Norton Show at the end of 2013, Yentob catches up with each Python as they go their separate ways before reuniting in mid 2014. John Cleese is seen performing solo on his Alimony Tour and attending a book launch for his upcoming memoirs, So, Anyway. Michael Palin is in Yorkshire filming the supernatural drama Remember Me for the BBC. Like Cleese, he is also preparing for the launch of a book, in this case his third volume of diaries, Travelling To Work. Meanwhile, Terry Gilliam introduces a private screening of his new film The Zero Theorem and is also busy directing another opera, this time Hector Berlioz’s Benvenuto Cellini, while Terry Jones is shown directing his first film in almost 20 years, Absolutely Anything.

While all this is happening, Yentob charts the progress of Eric Idle, who has taken on the job of directing the reunion shows. At one point they drive through Hollywood to collect Monty Python’s famous albatross from storage to return it to England - the stuffed bird having previously been transported to the US for one of Idle’s solo tours. Choreographer Arlene Philips and composer John Du Prez are seen rehearsing the dance routines and musical numbers respectively, while Idle works out the show's running order. Some sketches originally considered for inclusion, including "Gumby Brain Specialist" and "Custard Pie", would be cut from the final line-up.

The documentary ends with the five Pythons beginning a full dress rehearsal. The ten night run of shows began two days after the programme aired.

== Cast ==
- Alan Yentob
- John Cleese
- Terry Gilliam
- Eric Idle
- Terry Jones
- Michael Palin
- Arlene Philips
- John Du Prez
- Simon Pegg
- Jennifer Wade

== Credits ==
- Jack Cocker - Cinematographer, Producer & Director
- Holly Gilliam - Associate Producer
- Valentine Douglas, Andrew Quigley - Film Editors
- Alan Yentob - Series Editor
