= Kids Company =

Children's charity

Kids Company (now Keeping Kids Company (in liquidation))
- Founded: 1996; 30 September 1997 (incorporated); 25 February 1998 (registered as a charity)
- Founder: Camila Batmanghelidjh
- Dissolved: 5 August 2015 (Closed); 12 August 2015 (Winding-up petition made); 20 August 2015 (Winding-up order made)
- Purpose: "Inner-city children and young people."
- Location: London
- Region served: Mainly Greater London; also some limited services in Bristol and also in Liverpool.
- Key people: Camila Batmanghelidjh (Founder and chief executive); Alan Yentob (Chairman)
- Employees: 495 (Reported, 2013); 650 (Reportedly, at closure in 2015)
- Volunteers: 9,296 (Reported, 2013)
- Company number (E.W.) 03442083; Charity number (E.W.) 1068298

Keeping Kids Company (in liquidation), formerly Kids Company, was an incorporated and registered charity, founded by Camila Batmanghelidjh in 1996 to provide support to deprived inner city children. From its original "drop-in" centre in south London it expanded over the following two decades to be a prominent children's charity operating 11 centres, mostly within Greater London, but also in Bristol and Liverpool. The charity claimed that from 2011 it was supporting 36,000 children per year, although this figure is disputed. Funding was provided by businesses and through government grants.

In 2015, it was first reported that Kids Company was in significant financial difficulty. A £3 million grant from the government was temporarily withheld until Batmanghelidjh agreed to resign as chief executive. After the grant was made, the government withdrew it and sought to reclaim the amount after alleged breaches of the grant's terms. A police investigation into allegations of sexual abuse at the charity was also announced. On 5 August 2015, the charity ceased operations and announced it would begin the process of placing itself into compulsory liquidation.

On 20 August 2015, a winding-up order against Kids Company was made at the High Court of Justice of England and Wales, on the petition of Kids Company presented on 12 August 2015. On the making of the winding-up order, an official receiver – Matthew Stone – was assigned as the liquidator of the company. In February 2021, after a three-year case, Mrs Justice Falk in the High Court rejected the Official Receiver's assertion that Batmanghelidjh and the other trustees were unfit to be directors of a charity.

== Foundation and expansion ==
The organisation was founded in December 1996 by Camila Batmanghelidjh. The philosophy of the charity was based on her belief that children's behaviour is biologically determined and environmentally influenced. According to Batmanghelidjh, environmental factors can, ultimately, influence how children develop into adulthood through a type of re-wiring of the brain (neuroplasticity), for more positive outcomes in encouraging and caring environments. Writing in The Guardian, Peter Beresford, professor of social policy at Brunel University, suggested that Batmanghelidjh's belief that "parenting at an early age hard-wires children’s brains for success or failure, deviance or conformity" was "pseudoscience". Batmanghelidjh was interviewed for an academic study on the relationship between brain development and social deprivation, and according to the authors of the study, Batmanghelidjh was "clear that neuroscience is good for fundraising in the business sector".

Kids Company won the Ernst and Young ‘Social Entrepreneur of the Year 2005’ award and Batmanghelidjh received the ‘Woman of the Year’ in 2006. Kids Company helped young ex-offenders and disadvantaged children.

Kids Company depended on the financial support of charitable trusts and businesses, as well as grants from central and local government, including the City of London. It received significant donations from businesses such as Credit Suisse, Morgan Stanley, and John Lewis as well as celebrities such as JK Rowling, Jemima Khan, and the band Coldplay (the latter giving £8 million). The charity was also heavily dependent on public funding: in 2013, the government provided a fifth of its income. Between 2005 and 2015, the charity received £37 million in government grants.

The charity's first location was a "drop-in" centre in south London, established in 1996. In 2012, the charity carried out its Plate Pledge survey on tackling childhood hunger, malnutrition, and food insecurity which was later cited by the London Assembly in its own investigation into food poverty in London. The Plate Pledge fundraising campaign raised awareness of the number of children who go hungry. By 2015, Kids Company had expanded and had eleven centres, not only within Greater London, but also minor operational presence in both Bristol and in Liverpool, employing a total of 650 people. It provided a range of services to children, who in many cases were not being looked after by their parents, including counselling, hot meals at drop-in centres, and assistance with healthcare and housing. The charity attracted controversy through its practice of giving cash payments to the children it was helping.

The charity's annual reports claimed that the number of people it was helping increased from 13,500 in 2008 to 16,500 in 2010 and then rose to 36,000 in 2011, and remained at that number for each year afterwards. The Independent has reported that 8,264 of the 36,000 did not receive any support from the charity but were included because they attended the same school as children taking part in Kids Company therapy sessions or activities. In response, the charity said it was appropriate to include them because "the children benefited from the knock-on effects of helping their classmates". The 36,000 number was disputed at a meeting of the Public Administration Select Committee on 15 October 2015.

In August 2015, The Daily Telegraph criticised the company for paying £40k towards a "glowing" report by the London School of Economics (LSE) and subsequently employing the author of a favourable Centre for Social Justice report on secondment. According to the Telegraph, Batmanghelidjh has claimed repeatedly that the LSE report was proof of the charity's effectiveness.

Shortly after the charity's closure the band Coldplay were in discussions for a multimillion-pound rescue of part of the charity.

== Police investigation ==
On 30 July 2015, the Metropolitan Police announced an investigation into the charity by the complex case team of its sexual offences, exploitation, and child abuse command. The alleged abuse was between clients and did not involve staff. The investigation involved allegations of child sexual abuse relating to the period from 2008 to 2012.

There have been allegations (and denials) that serious complaints and sexual assault allegations were not investigated properly. The police inquiry subsequently found no evidence of criminality or failures of safeguarding.

== Financial problems and cessation of operations ==
=== Before 2015 ===
Kids Company finances and employees: financial years 2008 – 2013
Year	Income (£ million)	Spending (£ million)	Employees (full-time equiv.)
2008	11.2	11.0	176
2009	13.0	13.3	231
2010	14.2	14.2	244
2011	15.6	15.5	330
2012	20.3	19.0	356
2013	23.1	23.0	496

From 2009, the accounts of Kids Company presented to the Charity Commission contained repeated warning notes that the charity's financial reserves were inadequate relative to its size. Between 2009 and 2013, its income increased by 77% but its expenditures increased by 72% and almost all of the funding it received each year was spent in the same year.

In 2013, a research study by the London School of Economics identified "limited and unstable funding" as a major source of stress and anxiety for staff and "a massive challenge for the sustainability" of the charity. It also found that an increase in bureaucracy and excessive management could jeopardise the charity's effectiveness, and presented a challenge to its ability to sustain focus on the needs of its clients.

In March 2014, an audit of the charity carried out on behalf of the Charity Commission found that Kids Company had a "serious cash-flow" problem and noted that "without improving the cash position of the charity it is not possible to build reserves and invest in new activities and locations". The Financial Times has said that the charity "operated on a financial knife-edge". Over a three-year period, two of the charity's finance directors resigned because they felt that the charity's trustees failed to respond to the warnings that it needed to build its financial reserves. There have also been allegations by former Kids Company employees of extravagance and waste in the management of the charity's financial resources.

Kids Company relied heavily on government funding. Doubts about the advisability of providing the charity with funding began to be raised in government circles. During his tenure as Parliamentary Under Secretary of State for Children and Families in the Department of Education between 2010 and 2012, Tim Loughton raised "serious concerns" about the grants being given to the charity. In 2011 the government seconded two civil servants to the charity for a year to assist its management team in apparent recognition of concerns about Kids Company's financial position.

=== 2015 and later ===
In July 2015, it was reported that the government had decided to cease providing £5 million in annual funding and, as a result, Kids Company would have to undergo restructuring. The government had written to the charity the previous month offering a final emergency grant of £3 million provided a number of conditions were met. These included: a requirement that Batmanghelidjh step down as chief executive and Alan Yentob step down as chair of the trustees; that the charity immediately downsize; and that it commit to never operating at a loss. The requirement that Batmanghelidjh step down arose out of concerns over the charity's governance and how it was spending the grants it received from government. Senior civil servants had expressed concerns over paying the grant to the charity and it was only authorised to proceed when ministers Oliver Letwin and Matthew Hancock issued a "ministerial direction" to pay the grant, overriding the opinion of the civil servants.

Batmanghelidjh announced on 3 July that she was to step down as chief executive and terms were agreed on the £3 million grant which was paid to the charity at the end of July. However, the Government sought to recover the money the following week on the ground that Kids Company had breached the terms of the grant; specifically, that some of the grant had been used to pay staff salaries. Batmanghelidjh denied that this had breached the terms of the grant. The government grant was to have been matched by a private donation of £3 million, however, according to Batmanghelidjh, when the donor became aware of a police investigation into sexual abuse allegations at Kids Company it was withdrawn. Yentob has also said that following the abuse allegations, the trustees advised the philanthropists they could not accept the funds "because we know that with these allegations around we will not be able to fund-raise because people will say 'What's going on'"?

As a result, the charity announced that it would close down because "it is unable to pay its debts as they fall due" and it ceased operations at 7.00 pm on 5 August 2015. On the same day, Kids Company released an official statement on its website stating, amongst other things, that a winding up petition would be issued and that the charity would be placed into compulsory liquidation under the British Companies Acts, after a court hearing in due course. Its inadequate cash reserves, compared to other established charities, left it uniquely vulnerable to a shortfall in donations and was the ultimate cause of its collapse. In the immediate aftermath of the closure, an agency was asked by the government to review the cases of 6,000 children that had been supported by Kids Company.

The National Audit Office (NAO), an independent body which audits government departments, published a report on the government's funding of Kids Company on 29 October 2015. The charity had received at least £46 million of public funding, and had never been able to operate without government assistance. Concerns had been raised about cash flow and financial sustainability at least six times between 2002 and 2015.

The NAO's investigation followed the award of £3 million to the charity in June 2015, payable on 30 July, (the same day officials learned that the Metropolitan Police were investigating allegations of physical and sexual abuse), after government ministers overruled official warnings from the senior Cabinet Office civil servant that it would not represent value for money.

A NAO official said it was "unbelievable" that the money was handed over to Kids Company with "little focus on what it was actually achieving", Public Accounts Committee chairwoman Meg Hillier said. "The DfE oversaw the grant funding of Kids Company until summer 2013 but has limited records of monitoring activities before 2011", the report said.

The NAO had reported in 2015 that Kids Company received public funding for at least fifteen years, with at least £42m provided in government grants, including £28m from the Department for Education and its predecessors. It had also received about £2m from councils and £2m from the National Lottery.

The key findings of the (NAO) report were that:

1. Kids Company received 20% of the Department for Education's grant programme in 2008.
2. It received twice as much in grants as national children's charity Barnardo's from 2011 to 2013.
3. Kids Company had not been required to compete for its annual grant since 2013.
4. The government relied "heavily" on the charity's own self-assessments to monitor its performance until 2013.
5. The HM Revenue and Customs service wrote off the charity's tax debts of £590,000 in 2003.
6. The first Whitehall department to provide money was the Home Office in 2002, although most of the grant money was awarded by central government between 2005 and 2015.

The NAO's report had also found that despite "repeatedly expressed concerns" from officials, the government "continued to respond to the charity's requests for funding". Civil servants had noted that other organisations "appeared to offer better value for money" than Kids Company, which had "a consistent pattern of behaviour" of writing to ministers to express fears of redundancies and the impact of service closures, while raising the same concerns in the media in a way that tarnished the reputation of the government of the time.

Batmanghelidjh also had a reported £90,000 salary in 2014-2015.

Inside sources claimed that youngsters who were using narcotics were handed bundles of cash to pay off drug dealers and that a chauffeur had his daughter's private school fees paid for by the charity in October 2015.

The PWC had noted in the course of their work, a sum of £6,684 in payments for one beneficiary, they found that £4,000 of spending had no receipts, and that spending on Christmas presents for clients was logged in January 2014 and 2015.

At least £134,293 of the group's money was paid out to relatives of staff members, according to a secret government report leaked to the press in October 2015.

In July 2017, Business Secretary Greg Clark said he would bring proceedings against the eight former directors of Kids Company and have them banned from company directorships. The directors were Sunetra Devi Atkinson, Erica Jane Bolton, Richard Gordon Handover, Vincent Gerald O'Brien, Francesca Mary Robinson, Jane Tyler, Andrew Webster, and Alan Yentob.

=== Responses to the closure ===
In October 2015, Batmanghelidjh blamed the media and a civil service-led smear campaign for the demise of her charity and its "exceptional value". She later admitted that she had used what she called "loving blackmail" on politicians to obtain funding.

John Podmore, a trustee at the Pilgrim Trust, an organisation that gives grants to charities and which had previously cancelled grants to Kids Company over management concerns, said that "in the light of this report no-one in their right mind would sanction further funding. Rather, they would call a complete halt and demand answers as to where the previous funding went and on what basis".

Alan Yentob, who had recently testified to both the Commons Public Administration Select Committee and Public Accounts Select Committee, described suggestions of financial mismanagement at Kids Company as "complete rubbish". He had served as a chairman of the board of trustees for Kids Company from 2003, until the collapse of the charity in 2015.

==== Public Accounts Committee report ====
In November 2015, the Public Accounts Committee described the organisation as a failed "13 year experiment" and criticised both the Labour and Conservative governments for continuing to give public money against civil service advice. They also said that it was given more than major national charities receiving favourable treatment only because it was London-based. In fact it operated mainly in "just two London boroughs."

== 2021 court decision ==
In February 2021, after a three-year case, Mrs Justice Falk in the High Court rejected the Official Receiver's assertion that Batmanghelidjh and the other trustees were unfit to be directors of a charity, saying "Most charities would, I think, be delighted to have available to them individuals with the abilities and experience that the trustees in this case possess. It is vital that the actions of public bodies do not have the effect of dissuading able and experienced individuals from becoming or remaining charity trustees". She said: "[A] restructuring plan was agreed and a further government grant was awarded, however the charity was forced to close after sexual assault allegations [the same week]. The charity was exonerated following a police investigation - but by that time it was too late. Had it not been for those unfounded allegations, it is more likely than not that the restructuring would have succeeded and the charity would have survived." The judge found that there had been "no dishonesty, bad faith or personal gain on the part of Batmanghelidjh or the trustees ... Nor had there been any inappropriate expenditure on children assisted by the charity".
