= Ludmila's Broken English =

2006 novel by DBC Pierre

- First edition
- Author: DBC Pierre
- Language: English
- Genre: Black comedy
- Publisher: Faber & Faber
- Publication date: 2 March 2006
- Publication place: United Kingdom
- Media type: Print
- Pages: 318
- ISBN: 0-571-21518-1
- OCLC: 62532920

Ludmila's Broken English is the second novel by Booker Prize winner DBC Pierre. It was published in March 2006.

== Plot introduction ==
The novel follows two initially separate narratives set in the United Kingdom and Eastern Europe. Recently separated – at the age of 33 – conjoined twins Blair Albert and Gordon-Marie "Bunny" Heath struggle to cope with life in a post-globalisation and fully privatised London. Meanwhile, Ludmila Derev, an impoverished young woman living in the war-torn Southern Caucasus, leaves her mountain home to meet up with her boyfriend in the region's major town and send money back to her family. However, things start to go wrong and she ends up with her picture on a Russian Brides website. Slowly her life and those of the twins are drawn together.

== Quotes ==
"Blair Albert and Gordon-Marie Heath were omphalopagus: conjoined anteriorly at the trunk. They shared certain organs, but not the heart."

"While Blair possessed the twins' physical power – forza – their cunning resided in Gordon, making him dominant in most situations, despite being the weaker twin."

After being sent to Eastern Europe by Blair's American boss, Truman, Blair gives the twins sachets of "solipsidrine" whenever they need some confidence. Bunny however thinks the drug has a major problem:

"Listen: the qualities removed by your so-called cocktail are there for a purpose, Blair. They're the little voices that stop us raping and pillaging. It might suit your Yank mate to do away with them, but we're civilised people, from an ancient, civilised country."

Later Bunny again talks of the drug:

"Do you know what this drug does? Do you know its single active quality? The suspension of conscience, Blair. Do you hear?"

== Political parallels ==
The twins are named Blair Albert Heath and Gordon-Marie "Bunny" Heath – something many commentators have taken as a reference to Tony Blair and Gordon Brown. Their father is Ted Heath – a possible reference to Edward Heath.

Blair is employed by a company called "Global Liberty Solutions" run by an American, Truman (the surname of an American president, Harry Truman), to go to a foreign country and sort out a problem. He is given a drug, which suspends the "conscience", to get him through difficult situations. His arrival in the country leads to the shooting of the majority of Blair's hosts, and the rape of the family's daughter.

== Critical reception ==
Ludmila's Broken English received mixed reviews from critics. Andrew Reimer of The Sydney Morning Herald wrote; "This weird and wonderfully outrageous novel is filled to the brim with insights..." Publishers Weekly wrote that "he succeeds in shocking his audience with this maddeningly entertaining encore." Kirkus wrote; "Some of the material might have generated laughs as a five-minute Saturday Night Life “wild and crazy guys” sketch, but it quickly wears thin as a novel." Sophie Harrison of The New York Times opined; "It is a very sad thing to report, but this novel, unlike its predecessor, does not work."
