= Imagine (TV series) =

British television arts series, 2003–2024

- Genre: Documentary
- Presented by: Alan Yentob
- Country of origin: United Kingdom
- Original language: English
- No. of series: 22

Production
- Executive producer: Alan Yentob
- Production companies: BBC Television; BBC Studios Documentary Unit

Original release
- Network: BBC One
- Release: 11 June 2003 – 3 March 2025

Imagine (typeset as imagine...) was a wide-ranging arts documentary television series first broadcast on BBC One in 2003. The show was hosted and executive-produced by Alan Yentob from its launch until 2024. Most series consist of four to seven episodes, each on a different topic. Episodes have been directed by, among others, Geoff Wonfor, Lucy Blakstead, Jill Nicholls, Roger Parsons and Zoë Silver.

The future of the programme is uncertain following Yentob's death in 2025. An interview Yentob had recorded with painter Jenny Saville, intended for the programme, was broadcast on BBC2 on June 8 alongside repeats of Yentob's work including episodes of imagine....

== List of episodes ==
Series 1 (from 11 June 2003):

- "The Saatchi Phenomenon" – about businessman Charles Saatchi
- "Barbara Hepworth: Shapes Out of Feelings"
- "The Hip Hop Generation"
- "Stella McCartney: Stella's Story"
- "Carlos Acosta: The Reluctant Ballet Dancer"
- "The Portrait of Omai"
- "John Mortimer: Owning Up at 80"

Series 2 (from 12 November 2003):

- "The Voice of Bryn Terfel"
- "A Funny Business" – A look at British and American sitcoms
- "John Soane – Entertaining Mr Soane"
- "Martin Parr – The World According to Parr"
- "From Pencils to Pixels" – Celebrating the phenomenon of the animated feature film
- "An A-Z of the OED"

Series 3 (from 2 June 2004):

- "Edward Hopper – The Mysterious Mr Hopper"
- "Sitting for Lucian Freud"
- "Saint John Coltrane"
- "Peter Finlay – Dirty But Clean Pierre"
- "Unsuitable for Children?" – Exploring modern children's fiction
- "The Smoking Diaries" – about playwright Simon Gray

Series 4 (from 24 November 2004):

- "Arthur Miller – Finishing the Picture"
- "Beautiful Dreamer: Brian Wilson's Smile"
- "Bruce Nauman – The Godfather of Modern Art"
- "Marlon Brando"
- "Antonio Pappano – A Year at the Opera"

Series 5 (from 11 May 2005):

- "A Short History of Tall Buildings" (3 parts)

Series 6 (from 22 June 2005):

- Fantastic Mr Dahl – about children's author Roald Dahl
- Frida Kahlo
- "Being a Concert Pianist"

Series 7 (from 23 November 2005):

- "Elgar and the Missing Concerto"
- "Amos Oz – The Conscience of Israel"
- "Chuck Close – Close Up"
- "Rhythm Is It!"

Series 8 (from 17 January 2006)

- "Sweet Home New Orleans" – examining the city's musical heritage
- "Andy Warhol – Warhol Denied"
- "A Funny Thing Happened on the Way to the Studio"
- "Sitting Comfortably" – Tracing the changing styles of the modern chair

Series 9 (from 23 May 2006)

- "Being Hamlet" – about actor Wayne Cater as he prepares to play Hamlet
- "The Artist Formerly Known As Cat Stevens" – telling the story of pop star Cat Stevens and how he became Yusuf Islam.
- "The Ingenious Thomas Heatherwick"
- "A Picture of the Painter Howard Hodgkin"

Series 10 (from 17 October 2006)

- "Peter Pan: a Hard Act to Follow"
- "Velazquez, the Painter's Painter"
- "A Play for Today" – about Jeremy Weller's play The Foolish Young Man
- "The Movie Brats, Take Two" – about a group of maverick American directors
- "Who Cares About Art?" – follows the work of five art curators
- "Hans Holbein, International Man of Mystery"
- "Being a Diva" – about operatic divas
- www.herecomeseverybody.co.uk – a history of the World Wide Web
- "And Then There Was Television" – about the early days of television

Special (27 December 2006)

- "The Beatles in Love" – documenting the creation of The Beatles project Love

Series 11 (from 8 May 2007)

- "Gilbert and George" – No Surrender
- "Stealing Klimt" – the story of a 90-year-old's struggle to recover her family's paintings.
- "Scott Walker"
- "It's the Surreal Thing" – a history of Surrealism

Special (4 July 2007)

- "Damon and Jamie's Excellent Adventure" – documentary about cartoon pop group Gorillaz' foray into opera

Series 12 (from 23 October 2007)

- "Henry Perkins: Bolshoi Boy" – following a British boy at the Bolshoi Ballet Academy
- "Bollywood's Big B" – a profile of Bollywood actor Amitabh Bachchan
- "Helvetica"
- "Louise Bourgeois: Spiderwoman" – (with interviews from leading British artists Tracey Emin, Antony Gormley and Stella Vine)
- "How to Get on in the Art World" – featuring material on the Frieze Art Fair
- "The Secret of Life" – looking at the popularity of self-help books
- "Richard Rogers, Inside Out"
- "Marc Newson: Urban Spaceman"

Series 13 (from 23 May 2008)

- "Doris Lessing – The Hostess and The Alien"
- "Oliver Sacks – Tales of Music and The Brain"
- "Annie Leibovitz – Life Through a Lens"
- "A Trip to Asia: On the Road with the Berlin Philharmonic"
- "A Wild Sheep Chase: In Search of Haruki Murakami"
- "Werner Herzog – Beyond Reason"
- "Love, Loss and Anthony Minghella"

Series 14 (from 5 October 2008)

- "The Story of the Guitar – In the Beginning"
- "The Story of the Guitar – Out of the Frying Pan"
- "Dangerous Liaisons: When Akram Met Juliette"
- "The Story of the Guitar – This Time It's Personal"
- "A Love Story"
- "Jay-Z: He Came, He Saw, He Conquered"
- "Let There Be Light"
- "How an Orchestra Saved Venezuela's Children"
- "Richard Serra: Man of Steel"
- "Heavy Metal in Baghdad"

Series 15 (from 23 June 2009)

- "Save the Last Dance for Me: The Company of Elders"
- "David Hockney – A Bigger Picture"
- "Rufus Wainwright – Prima Donna"
- "William Eggleston – The Colourful Mr Eggleston"
- "Art in Troubled Times: A New Deal for Art"
- "Art in Troubled Times: The Home Front"

Series 16 (from 17 November 2009)

- "The Year of Anish Kapoor"
- "Dame Shirley Bassey – The Girl from Tiger Bay"
- "Own Art" – looking at an Arts Council scheme that enables people from all walks of life to buy a piece of art
- "Joan Baez – How Sweet the Sound"
- "Placido Domingo - The Time of My Life"
- "Scrabble – A Night on the Tiles"

Series 17 (from 5 April 2010)

- "Vincent Van Gogh: Painted with Words"
- "The Rolling Stones – The Stones in Exile"

Series 18 (from 15 June 2010)

- "Nigel Kennedy's Polish Adventure"
- "Art Is Child's Play"
- "Diana Athill – Growing Old Disgracefully"
- "Tom Jones – What Good Am I?"

Series 19 (from 16 November 2010)

- "Ai Weiwei – Without Fear or Favour"
- "Ron Galella – Smash His Camera"
- "The Weird Adventures of Eadweard Muybridge"
- "Ben Hur in Bath"
- "Ray Davies – Imaginary Man"

Special (23 February 2011)

- The Plinth, the Model, the Artist and his Sculpture – Film about Marc Quinn's sculpture "Alison Lapper Pregnant" in place on Trafalgar Square's Fourth plinth during 2005 to 2007.

The Trouble with Tolstoy (from 27 March 2011)

- "At War with Himself"
- "In Search of Happiness"

Series 20 (from 28 June 2011)

- "The Man Who Forgot How to Read and Other Stories"
- "The Pharaohs' Museum on Liberation Square"
- "Lennon: The New York Years"
- "Harry Nilsson: The Missing Beatle"
- "Iraq in Venice"
- "U2: From the Sky Down"

Series 21 (from 1 November 2011)

- "Grayson Perry and the Tomb of the Unknown Craftsman
- "Simon & Garfunkel – The Harmony Game"
- "Alan Ayckbourn – Greetings from Scarborough"
- "Vidal Sassoon – A Cut Above"
- "The Lost Music of Rajasthan"
- "Books – The Last Chapter?"
- "The Art of Stand-Up – Part One"
- "The Art of Stand-Up – Part Two"

Series 22 (from 26 June 2012)

- "Theatre of War"
- "Paul Simon's Graceland – Under African Skies"
- "Just One Falsetto"
- "Glasgow: The Grit and The Glamour"
- "Dancing with Titian"

Series 23 (from 19 September 2012)

- "The Fatwa – Salman's Story"
- "Freddie Mercury: The Great Pretender"
- "Ian Rankin and the Case of the Disappearing Detective"
- "Do or Die: Lang Lang's Story"
- "The Many Lives of William Klein"
- "How Music Makes Us Feel"
- "Jeanette Winterson: My Monster and Me"
- "A Beauty is Born: Matthew Bourne's Sleeping Beauty"

Series 24 (from 28 March 2013)

- "Beyoncé: Life Is But a Dream"
- "David Bowie – Cracked Actor"
- "Vivian Maier – Who Took Nanny's Pictures?"

Series 25 (from 5 Nov 2013)

- "Edmund de Waal: Make Pots or Die"
- "Broadway Musicals: A Jewish Legacy"
- "Turning the Art World Inside Out"
- "Judith Kerr: Hitler, the Tiger and Me"
- "Who's Afraid of Machiavelli?"

Series 26 (from 18 May 2014)

- "Rio 50 Degrees: Carry On CaRIOca"
- "Philip Roth Unleashed" (2 parts)
- "Monty Python: And Now for Something Rather Similar"

Series 27 (from Winter 2014)

- "The Art That Hitler Hated: The Sins of the Fathers"
- "Bette Midler: The Divine Miss M"
- "Bette Midler: The Showgirl Must Go On"
- "Anselm Kiefer: Remembering The Future"
- "The One and Only Mike Leigh"
- "Colm Toibin: His Mother's Son"

Series 28 (from Summer 2015)

- "Frank Gehry: The Architect Says, Why Can't I?"
- "Jeff Koons: Diary of A Seducer"
- "Beware of Mr Baker"
- "Toni Morrison Remembers"
- "Richard Flanagan: Life After Death"

Series 29 (from Autumn 2015)

- "Shylock's Ghost"
- "Antony Gormley: Being Human"
- "My Curious Documentary"
- "The Last Impresario"
- "The Ecstasy of Wilko Johnson"
- "David Chipperfield: A Place to Be"
- "Carlos Acosta: Cuba Calls"

Summer 2016

- "One Night in 2012"
- "DANGER! Cornelia Parker"
- "Georgia O'Keeffe: By Myself"
- "Sir Roderick Stewart: Can't Stop Me Now"

Shorts (2016-7)

- "The Handmade Films of William Kentridge - Part 1"
- "The Handmade Films of William Kentridge - Part 2"

Autumn 2016

- "The Seven Killings of Marlon James"
- "The Triumph and Laments of William Kentridge"
- "Serial Killers - The Women Who Write Crime Fiction"
- "The Art World's Prankster: Maurizio Cattelan"
- "Listen to Me Marlon"

Winter 2016

- "She Spoke the Unspeakable"
- "Maya Angelou: And Still I Rise"
- "Alice Neel: Dr Jekyll and Mrs Hyde"
- "Chris Ofili - The Caged Bird's Song"

Summer 2017

- "Mapplethorpe: Look at the Pictures"
- "Margaret Atwood: You Have Been Warned!"
- "Alma Deutscher: Finding Cinderella"
- "Cameron Mackintosh: The Musical Man"

Winter 2017-8

- "Rachel Whiteread: Ghost in the Room"
- "Mel Brooks: Unwrapped"
- "Philip Pullman: Angels and Daemons"
- "Ingrid Bergman in Her Own Words"
- "Andrew Lloyd Webber: Memories"
- "Habaneros: You Say You Want a Revolution? Part One"
- "Habaneros: You Say You Want a Revolution? Part Two"

2018

- "Rupert Everett: Born to be Wilde"
- "Orhan Pamuk: A Strange Mind"
- "Rose Wylie: This Rose Is Blooming"
- "Tacita Dean: Looking to See"
- "Hockney, The Queen and the Royal Peculiar"
- "George Benjamin: What Do You Want to Do When You Grow Up?"
- "Tracey Emin: Where Do You Draw the Line?"
- "Becoming Cary Grant"
- "Andrea Levy: Her Island Story"

2019

- "James Graham: In the Room Where It Happens"
- "Jo Brand: No Holds Barred"
- "Bill Viola: The Road to St Paul's"
- "Edna O'Brien: Fearful... and Fearless"
- "Faith Ringgold: Tell It Like It Is"
- "Olafur Eliasson: Miracles of Rare Device"
- "EastSide Story"

2020

- "This House is Full of Music"
- "Lemn Sissay: The Memory of Me"
- "Kate Prince: Every Move She Makes"
- "Kwame Kwei-Armah: ... My Name is Kwame"
- "Marina Abramovic: The Ugly Duckling"

2021

- "We'll Be Back"
- "Bernardine Evaristo: Never Give Up"
- "Tom Stoppard: A Charmed Life"
- "Kazuo Ishiguro: Remembering and Forgetting"

2022

- "Marian Keyes: My (not so) Perfect Life"
- "Labi Siffre: This Is My Song"
- "Wayne McGregor: Dancing on the Edge"
- "Miriam Margolyes: Up for Grabs"
- "Jacob Collier: In the Room Where It Happens"

2023

- "Stephen Frears: Director for Hire"
- "The Factory: Made in Manchester"
- "Russell T. Davies: The Doctor and Me"
- "French & Saunders: Pointed, Bitchy, Bitter"

2024

- "Pet Shop Boys: Then and Now"

2025

- "The Academy of Armando"

Other

- 2006: "Imagine... A Mildly Amusing Panel Show" – a special highlights edition of Never Mind the Buzzcocks, a parody of the Imagine series, presented by Yentob himself.
- 2024: "Salman Rushdie: Through a Glass Darkly" – featuring clips from Rushdie's 2012 appearance as well as a new interview from Yentob, broadcast on BBC2 as a standalone documentary.
