= DBC Pierre =

Australian author (born 1961)

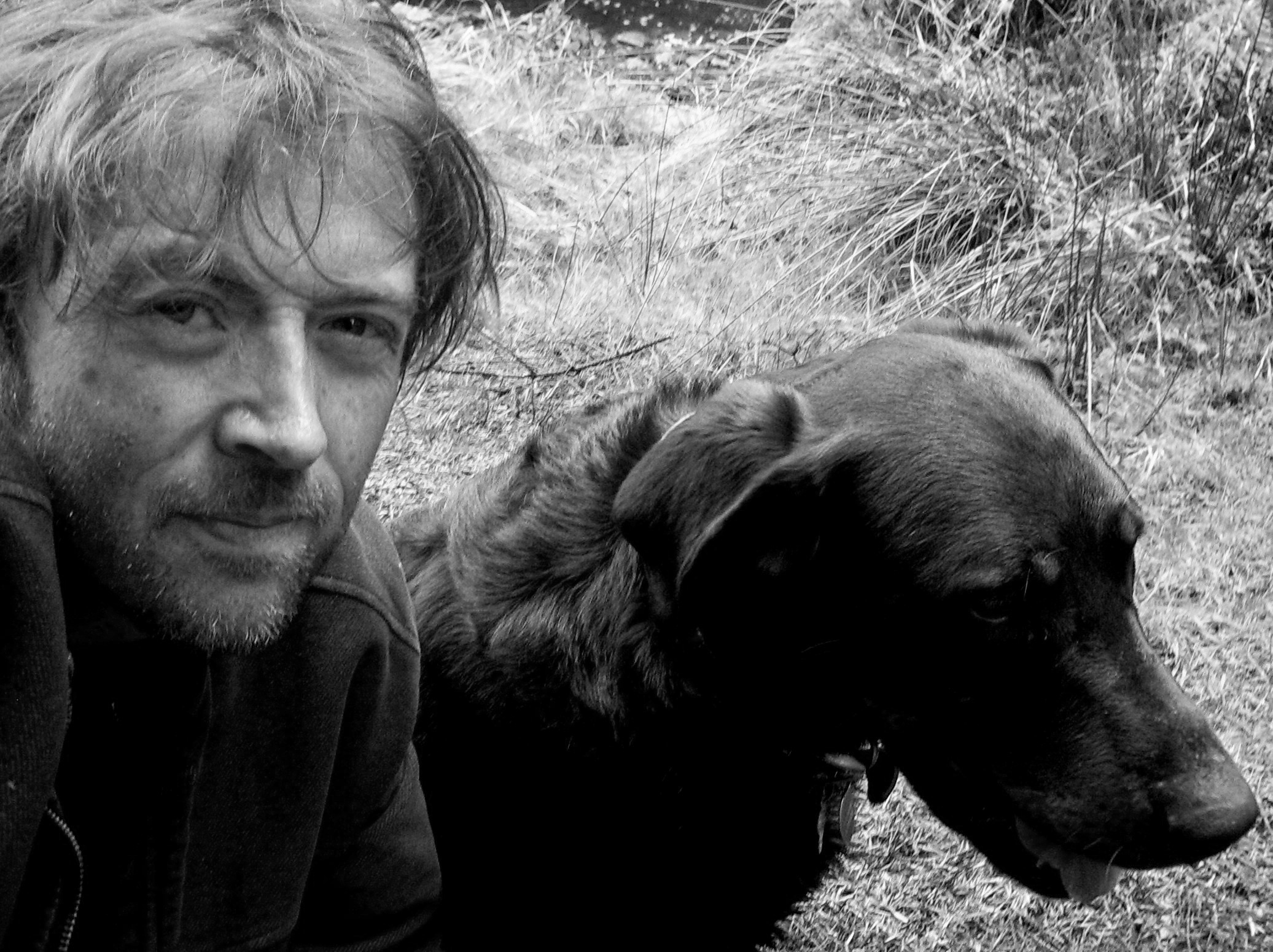
- Born: Peter Warren Finlay; 1961 (age 64–65); Old Reynella, South Australia
- Occupation: Novelist
- Writing career
- Pen name: DBC Pierre
- Period: 2003–present
- Genres: Satire, dark comedy, allegory
- Notable work: Vernon God Little

Peter Warren Finlay (born in 1961), also known as DBC Pierre, is an Australian author who wrote the novel Vernon God Little.

Pierre was born in South Australia, and largely raised in Mexico. He has resided in the Republic of Ireland and now, according to an August 2020 interview in The Guardian, lives in Cambridgeshire.

Pierre was awarded the 2003 Man Booker Prize for Vernon God Little, his first novel, becoming the third Australian-born author to be so honoured. Upon winning the Whitbread First Novel Award in 2003 he became the first writer to receive a Man Booker and a Whitbread for the same book. The book also won the Bollinger Wodehouse Everyman Prize for comic literature at the Hay Festival in 2003, and earned the author a James Joyce Award from the Literary and Historical Society of University College Dublin.

== Early life ==
Born in Old Reynella, South Australia, where his father was lecturing in genetics at the University of Adelaide, Pierre had, by the age of two, already spent time in the United States, the South Pacific and Great Britain. He was then raised from early childhood into his 20s in Mexico City's community of Jardines del Pedregal, and attended Edron Academy.

Pierre was taken to revisit his home by Alan Yentob for the BBC television series Imagine in 2004.

He recalls, in a Guardian article of 1 September 2004, that he would later return to Durham most years, usually around the second week in July, to see the Durham Miners Gala. Aged seven, he fell ill with hepatitis and had to spend a year in bed. After he recovered, his parents were faced with the choice of keeping him a year behind in school, or letting him stay in his class and just catch up. They chose the latter. Pierre sees this as the moment "when all the trouble began... " as it meant his falling out with his peers.

His father, once decorated as a Lancaster Bomber pilot in World War II, by then a scientific partner to Nobel Peace Prize winner Norman E. Borlaug, fell ill when Pierre was sixteen, and died three years later.

== Middle years ==
Pierre's permanent residency in Mexico ended at Reynosa on the United States-Mexican border in the middle of the night when he said he was stopped trying to import a 6-litre sports car. He said he intended to drive through the Sonoran Desert to Mexico City, but Mexico at the time had a protectionist auto industry, making foreign vehicle imports illegal to all but tourists. Pierre succeeded in crossing with the car but found his papers cancelled by the time he reached Mexico City some 18 hours later. The border crossing at Reynosa is described in Pierre's novel Vernon God Little, as is the journey by road from the border.

Pierre says that, of the following years, nine were spent in a drug-induced haze, culminating with a stay in Australia where he finally collapsed. He described this period of his life in an interview given on the Australian television show Enough Rope with Andrew Denton in 2006:

I was lucky enough to be in Australia at the time, having come back to try my luck. The support network was fantastic. There's immediately the safety net under you here, which, in the rest of the world I wouldn't have survived, definitely. But, here, I was taken into therapy, where they told me that ... I was in the grip of bad psychology, and that this rabbit was never going to come out of the hat and I should get used to the idea, which was what I needed at the time.

During his twenties, he had been involved in a film production to explore the fall of the Aztec Empire and follow trails to the remains of Aztec Emperor Moctezuma, and possibly to his lost treasure, the whereabouts of which remains one of Mexico's great mysteries.

During the 1990s, he wrote his first novel whilst living in Balham, south London, finally agreeing a publication deal with Faber and Faber on 11 September 2001. In the following weeks, he relocated to County Leitrim, Ireland, where he began work on a second novel. The Man Booker Prize comes with a monetary award of £50,000. Upon being notified of his victory, Pierre said that the money would go part way toward paying off the debts incurred in his 20s when psychological issues and drug abuse were driving forces. The letters in his pen name stand for "Dirty but clean" in reference to his former hardships.

== Recent years ==
In 2005 Pierre revisited the Mexico of his youth to finally explore and document the downfall of the Aztecs. In this revealing Channel 4 documentary he revisits the Aztecs' epic tale of decline and conquest. The Last Aztec, part historical film and part road movie, was aired in 2006 and follows Pierre as he traces the advance of the Spanish conquistadors toward the Aztec capital. It also picks up the threads he had intended to pursue in his ill-fated production of years earlier, centring on the wizards and witches of an Otomi culture in a remote valley in the Sierra Madre mountains of central Mexico.

In 2007 his first novel, Vernon God Little, was adapted by Tanya Ronder for the London stage. It was directed by Rufus Norris at the Young Vic from 27 April to 9 June. To date, the work has been translated in more than 40 countries worldwide and produced as a play by at least four theatre companies.

In 2009, he donated the short story "Suddenly Dr Cox" to Oxfam's Ox-Tales project, four collections of UK stories written by 38 authors. Pierre's story was published in the Air collection. He is also a contributor to the 2009 rock biography on The Triffids Vagabond Holes: David McComb and the Triffids, edited by Australian academics Niall Lucy and Chris Coughran.

== Published works ==
Novels

- Vernon God Little (January 2003, Man Booker Prize 2003)
- Ludmila's Broken English (February 2006)
- Lights Out in Wonderland (September 2010)
- Breakfast with the Borgias (July 2014)
- Meanwhile in Dopamine City (August 2020)

Non-fiction

- Release the Bats (July 2016)

Short stories

- Suddenly Doctor Cox (May 2009)
- Petit Mal (November 2013)
