= Camila Batmanghelidjh =

British businesswoman (1963–2024)

Camila Batmanghelidjh CBE
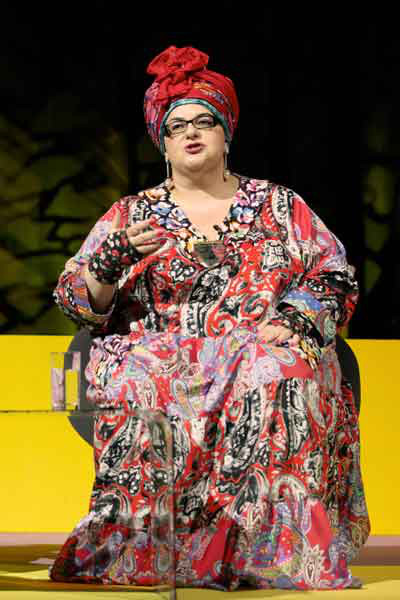
- Batmanghelidjh in 2011
- Born: 1963; Tehran, Iran
- Died: 1 January 2024 (aged 61); London, England
- Education: BA, Theatre Studies and Dramatic Arts; MA, Philosophy of Counselling and Psychotherapy
- Alma mater: University of Warwick; Antioch University
- Parent: Fereydoon Batmanghelidj (father)
- Camila Batmanghelidjh's voice Recorded January 2013 from the BBC Radio 4 programme Desert Island Discs

Camila Batmanghelidjh CBE (/kəˈmɪlə bætmænˈɡɛlɪdʒ/; Persian: کامیلا باتمانقلیچ; 1963 (Note: While her date of birth is not known, she celebrated her birthday on 1 January.) – 1 January 2024) was an Iranian-Belgian author, psychotherapist, and charity executive based in the United Kingdom. She was the founder of the charity Kids Company (closed in 2015) and Place2Be, charities that worked with marginalised children and young people at risk, in inner London, Bristol and Liverpool.

Between 1996 and 2015, Batmanghelidjh became a high-profile personality, fêted by celebrities and politicians for her work with Kids Company. In 2007, The Guardian described her as "one of the most powerful advocates for vulnerable children in the country". She was dubbed the "Angel of Peckham".

In 2015, amid allegations of mismanagement and the squandering of funds, Batmanghelidjh stepped down as the charity's chief executive, and Kids Company was closed. The official receiver's allegations that Batmanghelidjh and seven Kids Company trustees were unfit to hold directorships were dismissed in February 2021 in a high court judgement delivered by Mrs Justice Falk.

On 20 August 2015, the Charity Commission launched a statutory inquiry into Keeping Kids Company. However, this was placed on hold pending the outcome of the High Court judgement. The High Court rejected claims of mismanagement and exonerated the charity's directors and trustees. The Charity Commissioners' report was finally published in February 2022. The Commission made a finding of "mismanagement in the administration of the charity" over its repeated failure to pay creditors, including its workers and HMRC, on time.

== Early life ==
Camila Batmanghelidjh was born in Tehran, Iran in 1963, the third of four children, to Fereydoon Batmanghelidj (c. 1931–2004), a doctor, and his wife Lucile, a Belgian national. Her parents met and married in London, where her father was studying at St Mary's Hospital, before returning to Tehran. Batmanghelidjh was born two-and-a-half months premature and was not expected to survive. Her birth was not registered and the date was not noted. Batmanghelidjh said that the preterm birth resulted in her developing learning difficulties (including dyslexia), and a self-proclaimed endocrine disorder affecting her weight.

== Education ==
Batmanghelidjh attended Sherborne School for Girls, a private school in Dorset, and the University of Warwick, where she received a first-class degree in Theatre and the Dramatic Arts. She trained as a psychotherapist at the London campus of Antioch University and the Tavistock Clinic. At the age of 25, she was employed as a part-time psychotherapist in a project in Camberwell, South London, funded by Children in Need. She also assisted NSPCC child protection and family service teams. Batmanghelidjh wrote three books: Shattered Lives: Children Who Live with Courage & Dignity; Mind the Child and Kids: Child Protection in Britain: The Truth.

== Charity work ==
=== The Place to Be ===
In 1991, Batmanghelidjh was involved in the formation of The Place to Be, a Family Service Unit project working with troubled children in primary schools. She worked at the unit for three years followed by two years when it had been established as Place2Be. Subsequently, several charitable trusts funded the project. Batmanghelidjh resigned from the project in 1996 to set up a new venture called Kids Company.

=== Southwark's Urban Academy ===
The Urban Academy was a post-16 educational and life skills academy in Southwark, South London. It was founded by Batmanghelidjh and was run by her Kids Company organisation. The organisation offered a second chance at education for young people who had experienced significant trauma and failed to engage with other settings.

=== Kids Company ===
In 1996, after leaving The Place To Be, Batmanghelidjh founded Kids Company, a charity that provided care to children whose lives had been disrupted by poverty, abuse, trauma and gang violence. Originally a single drop-in centre in Camberwell, Kids Company claimed it helped some 36,000 children, young people and families. This figure, recurring in the firm's Annual Reports for successive years, was queried as unclear and/or muddled. In her judgement in the 2021 High Court case Mrs Justice Falk stated that Kids Company had a "significant cohort of employees, together with a number of self-employed staff and volunteers".

Kids Company operated through a network of street-level centres, alternative education centres, and therapy houses, with over 40 schools in London and Bristol, as well as a performing arts programme in Liverpool.

The charity pioneered collaborations between scientists and its children to understand better how trauma negatively impacts brain development and health. The research was subsequently published in medical and scientific journals.

Kids Company also undertook pioneering work with the arts. Batmanghelidjh curated exhibitions exploring child trauma at Tate Modern, the Saatchi Gallery and The Royal Academy. In 2012, the arts programme at Kids Company was honoured by the Royal Society for Public Health for 'innovative and outstanding contributions to the field of arts and health practice with children and young people.'

Deborah Orr, in an interview with Batmanghelidgh, reported in 2012 that 15 independent evaluations of Kids Company had found that 96% of children assisted returned to education and employment and it had an "impact on crime reduction" of 88%.

In 2013, Kids Company was the subject of a major LSE study which concluded: "Kids Company combines flexibility and staff commitment to enable absolute focus on the needs of vulnerable children; they offer to the child the knowledge that someone cares, loves and will not give up on them, irrespective of any challenging and unstable response that may come back from the child." The study also found staff productivity and well-being to be above 90 per cent. It was later revealed that the study was commissioned by Kids Company, who paid £40,000 for the report.

Later, it emerged that Batmanghelidjh had asked the Cabinet Office to bring in KPMG accountants to identify the number of abused, neglected and mentally ill children the State had legal responsibility for, which was not being met, so that instead they were self-referring to the charity. The Cabinet Office was reluctant to participate in this fact-finding initiative and later called for Batmanghelidjh's resignation. The central challenge for the charity and its sustainability was the fact that abused children and young people were not only accessing the provision themselves, but also referring friends who were being harmed.

In 2014, Batmanghelidjh invited the Centre for Social Justice to review child protection failings in Britain and the outcome was a damning report called Enough is Enough.

After these findings, Batmanghelidjh sought a partnership between major child welfare agencies and mental health organisations, such as the Institute of Psychiatry, intending to launch a campaign called "See the Child: Change the System", which had funding to explore a new design for UK children's services.

In 2015, it was first reported that Kids Company was in significant financial difficulty due to unsubstantiated allegations. Kids Company received a £3 million government grant in July of that year but within ten minutes of the money transfer, allegations of sexual abuse emerged via Newsnight. The programme broadcast the allegations before the outcome of any police investigation, and the report led funders to withdraw grants.

In August 2015, the charity had a year's funding, including three months' reserves, and could meet all its liabilities. Mrs Justice Falk later confirmed that the charity would have survived if not for the unsubstantiated sexual abuse allegations, broadcast by Newsnight without being brought to the charity's attention or any professional bodies.

The Metropolitan Police cleared the charity of wrongdoing in early 2016 and commended its safeguarding practices.

In July 2015, a report by Newsnight and BuzzFeed revealed that public funding for Kids Company was to be withheld unless Batmanghelidjh was replaced. On 3 July, it was reported that Batmanghelidjh would step down as chief executive in the next few months and continue in a "presidential" role.

On 5 August 2015, Kids Company closed its operations, less than a week after receiving a government grant of £3 million. The charity was given the money against the advice of officials, who had raised concerns about the value of money and how it would be spent. The charity had announced that it was closing down because "it [was] unable to pay its debts as they fall due".

Speaking to The Daily Telegraph in August 2015, Batmanghelidjh said she hoped Kids Company could return after some restructuring and once the media storm had died down.

After 2015, Batmanghelidjh continued to work with vulnerable children and families. This included the provision of good therapy, advocacy and safeguarding. She collaborated with several charities, including Oasis Community Learning.

In February 2016, the Commons Public Administration and Constitutional Affairs Committee (PACAC) released a report describing the collapse of Kids Company as "an extraordinary catalogue of failures". It concluded that throughout Kids Company's 19-year existence, the Board ignored repeated warnings about the charity's financial health, failed to provide robust evidence of the charity's outcomes, and did not adequately address increasing concerns about the suitability of its programmes and behaviours of its staff. The Trustees' negligent financial management rendered the charity unable to survive the predicted reduction in donations following the emergence of allegations of sexual abuse. Its closure left many vulnerable beneficiaries without an essential source of support. The report cites extraordinary accounts of luxury items and holidays or spa days being lavished on "Camila's kids", a favoured group of clients, concluding that such expenditure diverted charitable funds from other projects and programmes that had the potential to provide more long-term and effective support to a wider group of young people.

On 20 October 2020, the Official Receiver opened a case at the High Court against former directors of Kids Company, including seeking a six-year disqualification from holding company directorships for Ms Batmanghelidjh, and four years for Alan Yentob. even though she was chief executive and not a director. On 12 February 2021, the High Court dismissed the case against Batmanghelidjh and the other trustees. Mrs Justice Falk in the High Court said: "Most charities would, I think, be delighted to have available to them individuals with the abilities and experience that the trustees in this case possess. It is vital that the actions of public bodies do not have the effect of dissuading able and experienced individuals from becoming or remaining charity trustees." The judge spoke of Batmanghelidjh's "enormous dedication [that] she showed to vulnerable young people over many years" and her achievements, adding, "It would be unfortunate if the events [which are] the focus of this decision were allowed to eclipse those achievements."

The judgement also suggested that the Charity Commission would have been better placed to deal with the case. The Commission had launched a statutory inquiry into Keeping Kids Company under Section 46 of the Charities Act 2011, on 20 August 2015, but the Insolvency Service's High Court process took precedence and the Commission's inquiry was put on hold pending judgement.

The regulator's inquiry report was finally published in February 2022. The Commission criticised the trustees and former CEO of Kids Company and made a formal finding of "mismanagement in the administration of the charity" over its repeated failure to pay creditors, including its own workers and HMRC, on time. On the matter of Batmanghelidjh's power and influence over the board of trustees, the Commission stated: "Founders of charities need to be mindful that a permanent leadership role is rarely in the best interests of a charity. There are other ways of harnessing the passion and talent of founders or charismatic individuals without their having executive or strategic power and responsibility. No charity should be defined by a single individual".

== Death ==
Batmanghelidjh died on 1 January 2024. The Guardian reported that she had "died peacefully on New Year’s Day, having celebrated her birthday with family and friends."

== Awards and honours ==
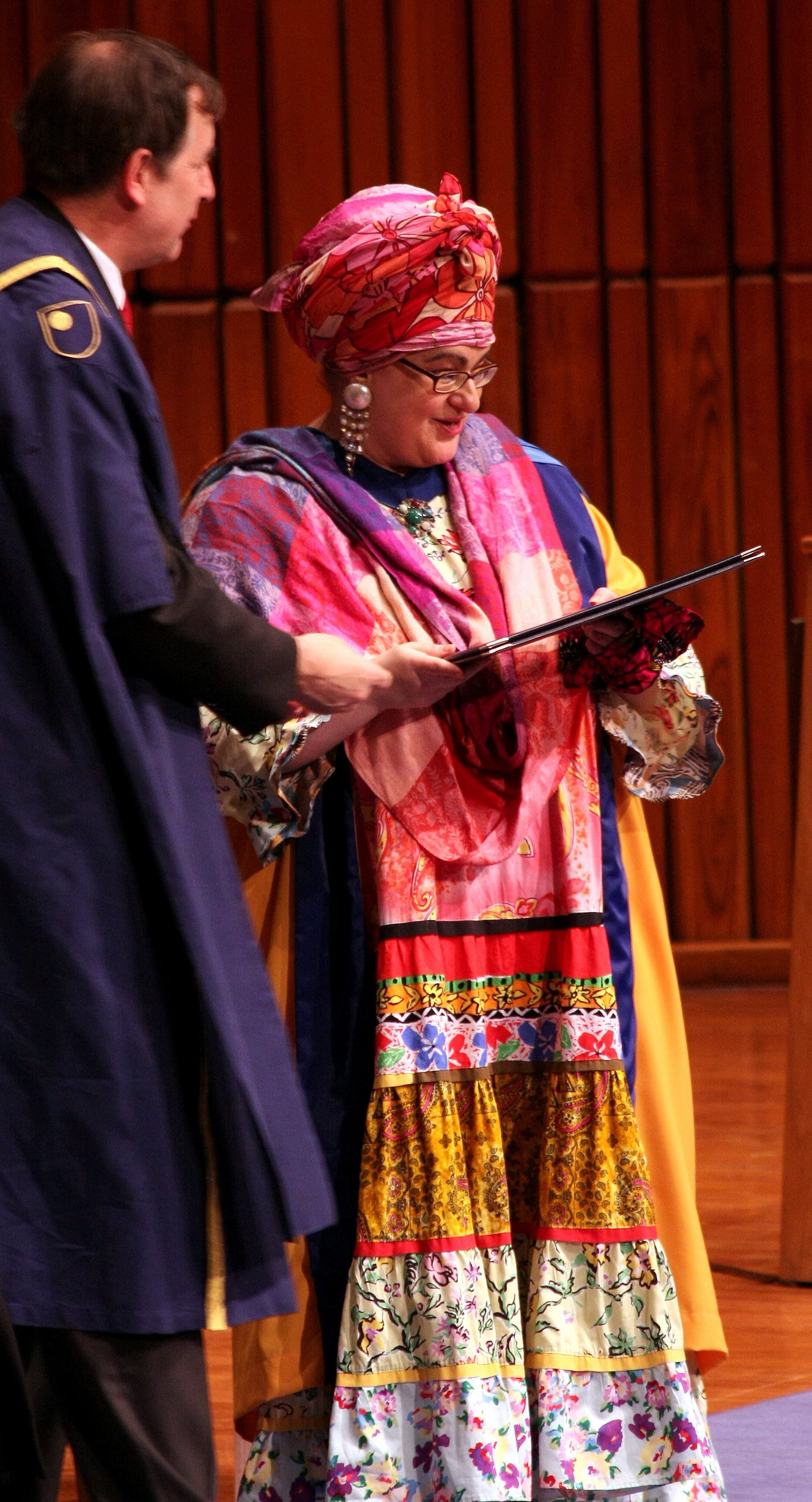
Batmanghelidjh receiving an honorary degree from the Open University in 2008

In 2009, Batmanghelidjh was named Businesswoman of the Year in the Dods and Scottish Widows Women in Public Life Awards. A New Statesman readers' poll awarded her the title Person of the Year in 2006. She also received Ernst and Young's Social Entrepreneur of the Year award (2005), Third Sector magazine's Most Admired Chief Executive (2007), and the Centre for Social Justice's lifetime achievement award in 2009. Batmanghelidjh was awarded honorary degrees and doctorates by several universities including York St John University, the Open University, Brunel University, London South Bank University, University of Warwick and Nottingham Trent University. In September 2006, she was conferred with an Honorary Fellowship of Goldsmiths, University of London.

In January 2009, Batmanghelidjh was awarded an honorary degree by the Tavistock & Portman NHS Trust in conjunction with the University of East London for "significant achievements for children and young people living in poverty."

In February 2013, she was named one of the 100 most powerful women in the United Kingdom by Woman's Hour on BBC Radio 4. She was appointed an honorary Commander of the Order of the British Empire (CBE) for services to children and young people. In September 2014, she became an Honorary Fellow of UCL.

== Publications ==
- Batmanghelidjh, Camila (May 1999). "Whose political correction?: The challenge of therapeutic work with inner-city children experiencing deprivation". Psychodynamic Counselling. 5 (2): 231–244. doi:10.1080/13533339908402537.
- "Betrayal: the politics of child mental health". RSA Journal. 148 (5493): 38–45. 2000.
- Shattered Lives: Children Who Live with Courage and Dignity. London: Jessica Kingsley. 2006. ISBN 978-1-843-10603-6.
- Camila Batmanghelidjh (October 2011). "England riots 2011: Camila Batmanghelidjh takes a look in the mirror". Socialist Lawyer (59): 16–17. doi:10.13169/socialistlawyer.59.0016.
- Mind the Child. London: Penguin Books. 2013. ISBN 978-1-846-14655-8.
- Warnecke, Tom, ed. (2015). "Clinical snobbery—get me out of here! New clinical paradigms for children with complex disturbances". The Psyche in the Modern World. London: Karnac Books. pp. 43–61. ISBN 978-1-782-20046-8.
- Kids: Child Protection in Britain: The Truth. London: Biteback Publishing. 2017. ISBN 978-1785901195.

== Television, film and media ==
Batmanghelidjh was the subject of Ruby Wax Gets Streetwise, a documentary film about her charity work with Kids Company, presented by Ruby Wax. Directed by Michael Waldman, the film was broadcast on 15 March 2000 by BBC Two.

In 2002, she was interviewed by Fergal Keane for Taking A Stand, a radio documentary exploring her work as an advocate for "society's most anti-social, violent and disruptive children". The 30-minute documentary was first broadcast on 15 January 2002 by BBC Radio 4.

A 2003 Channel Four series, Second Chance, featured Batmanghelidjh's work at Kids Company with children who had been labelled "unteachable".

Batmanghelidjh's work with Kids Company was the subject of Tough Kids, Tough Love, a film by Lynn Alleway, first broadcast on 19 October 2005 by BBC Two. Alleway made a second film, at Batmanghelidjh's invitation, during the summer of 2015, which unwittingly captured the collapse of Kids Company. Sam Wollaston, writing in The Guardian, described it as: "like an invitation, on the evening of 14 April 1912, to the bridge of the Titanic". The film was broadcast as Camila's Kids Company: The Inside Story on 3 February 2016 by BBC One.

Video installation artist Larisa Blazic created a multi-screen video installation, Angel (of Peckham), which was displayed in Currys Digital shop window in August 2007 and was inspired by her and William Blake's vision of angels in Peckham Rye.

== See also ==
- List of Iranian women writers and poets
