= Larisa Blazic =

British video installation artist

- Born: 1970 (age 55–56)

Academic background
- Education: Belgrade University

Larisa Blazic (born 1970) is a British video installation artist and a senior lecturer at the Faculty of Media, Arts and Design, University of Westminster, with an interdisciplinary approach towards architecture and art.

== Biography ==
Larisa Blazic studied architecture at Belgrade University and received an MA in Hypermedia from the University of Westminster, London. Her work combines architectural design, sound and video using site-specific installations utilising audience participation, audio distribution and video. Her work at Westminster involves organising post-graduate studies in free and open-source software in the context of art and design. She has been a guest lecturer at the Ravensbourne (college), Middlesex University and Kingston University.

Blazic was short-listed for the New Contemporaries in 2005.

Blazic's multi screen video installation Angel (of Peckham) was displayed in Currys Digital shop window in August 2007 and was inspired by Camila Batmanghelidjh and William Blake's vision of angels in Peckham Rye.

== Selected solo exhibitions ==
- 2004 Something Beautiful video installation, Dana Library and Research Centre, London.
- 2007 205A Morning Lane a site-specific video installation, London.
- 2007 WAKE UP WHITNEY (205A Morning Lane in reverse), VINEspace, London.
- 2008 Morning Lane Eyes Phoenix Theatre, Leicester.
- 2008 In This Place Of Safety London Festival of Architecture Novas Gallery, London
- 2010 red carpet treatment various locations in Hackney, London.
