= A Prayer for My Daughter (play) =

1977 play by Thomas Babe

- Written by: Thomas Babe
- Characters: Sgt Kelly; Jack Delasante; Jimmy; Sean
- Original language: English
- Setting: The squad room of a downtown precinct

Premiere
- Date premiered: January 17, 1978
- Place premiered: USA

A Prayer for My Daughter is a 1977 play written by Thomas Babe and directed by Robert Allan Ackerman. It premiered in 1978 starring Alan Rosenberg and Laurence Luckinbill.

== Plot ==
The play is set in the interrogation room of a downtown New York City police station in the early hours of July 5. Two hardened cops (Sergeant Kelly and Jack Delasante) have arrested two suspects for the murder of an old woman. During the interrogations, the police try to get confessions from the two suspects, Sean and Jimmy. As they do, they reveal far more about their own vulnerabilities than they intend. The tension of the play is increased by constant updates, by phone, of the state of mind of one of Kelly's daughters. Lonely and unstable, she becomes increasingly suicidal during the play.

- Jimmy (Alan Rosenberg)
- Sgt Kelly (George Dzundza)
- Jack Delasante (Jeffrey DeMunn)
- Sean (Laurence Luckinbill)

== Discussion ==
Thomas Babe's writing deals with the traditional notion of a hero. Throughout A Prayer for My Daughter, the two 'heroes,' the police officers, increasingly blur the lines between right and wrong.

Its 2008 revival was described by critic Karen Fricker as a "poetic meditation on the lack of clear boundaries between masculine and feminine, and good and evil." It combines a threat of violence and homoeroticism. This was written a few years after the end of the Vietnam War, and Babe created one officer as a Vietnam veteran, coping with losing the war and being rejected by his countrymen in the anti-war protests and activism.

The play is named for William B. Yeats' poem for his newly born daughter. Each of the characters, in one way or another, has a daughter; and a variety of father/daughter relationships are explored. This is in contrast to the majority of family dramas related to parent/child relationships, which more often explore the father/son dynamic.

== Productions ==
It was first produced in 1978 in the United States at The Public Theater in New York City, directed by Joseph Papp.

The first UK production was at the Royal Court Theatre, London, in 1978 starring Antony Sher and Donal McCann. The play was first revived in 2008 by the Young Vic, directed by Dominic Hill and starring Colin Morgan, Matthew Marsh, Corey Johnson, and Sean Chapman.
