= The Testament of Jessie Lamb =

2012 dystopian novel by Jane Rogers

- Author: Jane Rogers
- Language: English
- Genre: Dystopian fiction; science fiction
- Set in: United Kingdom
- Published: 15 May 2012
- Publisher: Sandstone Press, Harper Perennial
- Publication place: United Kingdom
- Pages: 240 (paperback)
- Awards: 2012 Arthur C. Clarke Award
- ISBN: 9780062130808

The Testament of Jessie Lamb is a 2012 dystopian science fiction novel by Jane Rogers. The story takes place in a world in which Maternal Death Syndrome (MDS) causes pregnant women to die. The teenaged protagonist, Jessie Lamb, decides to become pregnant to help preserve humanity, knowing that it will cause her own death.

The novel received critical attention, winning the 2012 Arthur C. Clarke Award.

== Plot ==
The story opens with sixteen-year-old Jessie Lamb chained up in her room. Jessie's father is holding her captive. He gives her writing materials, and Jessie begins to narrate her story.

Several years prior, a plague known as Maternal Death Syndrome (MDS) strikes the world. This virus causes pregnant women to die of Creutzfeldt–Jakob disease. MDS will lead to the extinction of humanity if no cure is found.

Jessie becomes involved in a youth activist group known as Youth for Independence (YOFI). YOFI is hampered by personality conflicts and unclear goals. Jessie’s friend Sal is gang-raped. Sal invites Jessie to FLAME, radical feminist protest group.

Scientists discover that pregnant women can be placed in medically induced comas, allowing living babies to be delivered. Additionally, scientists develop a vaccine which can be used to protect embryos from MDS. Mothers will still die during pregnancy, but future generations will not be affected by MDS. A project known as the Sleeping Beauties program emerges. Young women volunteer to undergo surrogate pregnancy, giving their lives in order to preserve humanity.

Jessie’s parents fight; her father leaves and does not respond to any messages. During this time, Jessie enrolls in the Sleeping Beauties program. She decides against telling Sal, whose FLAME group believes that the program is exploitative. When Jessie’s father returns, she tells her parents about her desire to become a Sleeping Beauty. Her father tries to dissuade her, arguing that she should wait for further technological developments.

Meanwhile, Jessie's aunt Mandy becomes depressed due to her inability to become a mother. Mandy eventually joins a fundamentalist religious group, the Noahs. Mandy's mental health deteriorates. She intentionally becomes pregnant and dies from MDS.

Clashes erupt between rival activist groups including FLAME, the Noahs, and YOFI. New laws are passed which regulate the custody of the children born to Sleeping Beauties; despite this, Jessie intends to continue with her plan. Hoping to save her life, Jessie's father locks her in the house. She breaks a window and holds him hostage with the glass; she escapes.

Jessie returns to the Sleeping Beauties clinic, where she discusses her future pregnancy with the medical team. She decides to become a surrogate mother to an embryo with her father’s DNA; the baby will be her half-sister. Jessie says farewell to her parents. She successfully undergoes implantation and becomes pregnant. She addresses her memoir to her future child, whom she names Ray, imagining the child's life and future world.

== Background and publication history ==
The Testament of Jessie Lamb is the author's first speculative fiction novel. It suffered initial setbacks when no trade publisher would accept it. It was eventually accepted and published by Sandstone Press, a small independent Scottish publisher.

== Reception and awards ==
Tom Hunter, the director of the Arthur C. Clarke Award, called the novel "frighteningly plausible" and compared it to The Handmaid's Tale. Author Christopher Priest criticized the 2012 Clarke Award shortlist; he stated that The Testament of Jessie Lamb was the only worthy entry. Priest stated that the novel was "not wholly achieved" and that it could have focused on a "wider canvas, a sense that larger events are mounting in the background." Despite this, he felt that the novel's characterization and emotional impact were excellent, and that it deserved to win the award.

Niall Harrison of Strange Horizons wrote that Rogers focuses the novel on a smaller scale, avoiding examinations of the government response to MDS. This gives the novel "a very lived-in, everyday texture" which focuses on Jessie's experience. Harrison compared the novel to Greybeard by Brian Aldiss and The Children of Men by P. D. James. All of these novels explore childless worlds, but The Testament of Jessie Lamb has a different tone. Harrison described the previous works as "worn-down" and "exhausted", contrasting them with the "vigour of youthful immediacy" found in the latter work. Harrison praised the novel's "undeniable tension", stating that both Jessie and her father have well-developed points of view and praising the conflict between them.

Writing for The Guardian, Alfred Hickling praised the character of Jessie, as well as the "terrifyingly plausible" premise. The review criticized the book for "[lacking] a convincing explanation as to why all this is happening".

Kirkus Reviews wrote that the various activist groups and their causes were poorly developed, detracting from "what could have been a provocative story." The review also felt that Jessie's decisions were inconsistent with realistic teenaged behavior. The review concluded that the book is a "disturbing story that, in the end, somehow seems a bit shallow." Publishers Weekly called the book "unconvincing", noting that the premise is initially exciting but criticizing Jessie's predictable decision. The review concluded that the novel attempts to tackle big questions, but is "too slight to genuinely frighten."

The novel won the 2012 Arthur C. Clarke Award. It was longlisted for the 2011 Booker Prize.
