= Dominic Hill =

British theatre director

Dominic Hill is Artistic Director at the Citizens Theatre, Glasgow. He took up post in October 2011.

== Early life ==
Hill was born in Wimbledon on 22 April 1969.

== Career ==
Dominic Hill was appointed Artistic Director of the Citizens Theatre in 2011.

Dominic Hill’s programmes of classic texts told for contemporary audiences alongside Glasgow stories, as well as his own distinctive production style, have won the public and critics alike and have reaffirmed the Citizens Theatre's role as the leading producer of theatre in Scotland.

Since joining the Citizens in 2011, he has directed 1984, The Long Drop, Waiting for Godot (Best Director, 2026 CATS Awards), Beauty and the Beast (winner of Best Show for Children & Young People, 2026 UK Theatre Awards and Best Production for Children and Young People CATS Awards, 2026 CATS Awards), Small Acts of Love, Red Riding Hood, The Comedy of Errors (winner of Best Ensemble, 2022 CATS Awards), Krapp’s Last Tape/Go On, Cyrano de Bergerac, A Christmas Carol, Oresteia: This Restless House (winner of Best Director, 2016 CATS Awards), Hamlet, Crime and Punishment (winner of Best Director and Best Production, 2014 CATS Awards), King Lear and Betrayal (winner of Best Director, 2012 CATS Awards).

In 2013, Dominic became the most recognised Director in the history of Scotland’s leading theatre awards: the Critics’ Awards for Theatre in Scotland, holding 14 nominations and six wins since the awards were established in 2004.

Hill was Artistic Director of the Traverse Theatre in Edinburgh from 2008 to 2011.

He previously worked at Dundee Repertory Theatre where he was first Associate Director and then, from 2003, Joint Artistic Director. Whilst at Dundee Rep Dominic directed Peer Gynt, in co-production with the National Theatre of Scotland, which won four CATS Awards and toured to the Barbican in London.

He also worked as associate director at the Orange Tree Theatre, Richmond, London, where he was on the Orange Tree's Trainee Director scheme, and as assistant director at the Royal Shakespeare Company and assistant director at Perth Theatre. He directed Thomas Babe's play A Prayer for My Daughter at London's Young Vic Theatre in 2008.

Other credits include Alföld (A Play, A Pie and A Pint), Falstaff and Macbeth (Scottish Opera), The City Madam (Royal Shakespeare Company) and A Midsummer Night’s Dream (Regent’s Park Open Air Theatre and Scottish Opera).

== Awards ==
In 2026 Dominic won his 6th CATS (Critics Awards for Theatre in Scotland) award for Best Director - the most any director has won in the CATS' 14-year history. Awards include Best Director for Waiting for Godot (2026), This Restless House presented by the Citizens Theatre in association with National Theatre of Scotland (2015/16), Crime and Punishment (& Best Production 2013/14), Betrayal (2011/12) Peer Gynt, presented by Dundee Rep/National Theatre of Scotland (& Best Production 2007/08); and Scenes from an Execution (& Best Production 2003/04).
