= Fereydoon Batmanghelidj =

Iranian naturopath (1931–2004)

- Born: 1931; Tehran, Imperial State of Iran
- Died: 15 November 2004 (aged 72–73); Virginia, U.S.
- Occupation: Naturopath

Fereydoon Batmanghelidj (1931 – 15 November 2004) was an Iranian doctor, naturopath, HIV/AIDS denialist and writer. He is best known for believing increased water consumption is the cure for most disease, a view not supported by clinical evidence and considered quackery by medical experts.

== Life and family ==
Fereydoon Batmanghelidj was born in Iran in 1931. He attended secondary school in the United Kingdom, at Fettes College in Scotland, and later graduated from St Mary's Hospital Medical School of London University. He then practiced medicine in the United Kingdom, before returning to Iran. There he became a wealthy entrepreneur, helping in the development of hospitals and medical centres, and in sports projects, including the Ice Palace ice skating rink in Tehran.

In 1979, after the Iranian Revolution, he was sent to Evin Prison in Tehran, which housed political prisoners; he was incarcerated there for two years and seven months. Following his release in 1982, he moved to the United States.

He married Lucile, a Belgian, and they had four children: Ardeshir, Babak, Camila, and Lila, who died by suicide while he was imprisoned. His first marriage ended in divorce. He later married Xiaopo Huang Batmanghelidj.

He died from complications related to pneumonia on 15 November 2004. Resting place: National Memorial Park.

== Medical career ==
Batmanghelidj was trained at St Mary's Hospital Medical School, and practised medicine in the United Kingdom before his return to Iran.

He claimed that he discovered the medicinal value of water in treating the pain of peptic ulcers during his detention in Evin Prison by treating inmates with water when medication was not available. He advanced this position in a guest editorial in the Journal of Clinical Gastroenterology in 1983.

In 1992, he wrote Your Body's Many Cries for Water. In this book, Batmanghelidj asserts that chronic dehydration is the root cause of most pain and many ailments, opposing the use of drugs to cure conditions that he claimed could instead be addressed by increased water consumption.

He argued that water is an important provider of "hydro-electric" energy for the body and brain, by splitting into its components hydrogen and oxygen. This claim is not supported by scientific evidence.

=== Criticism ===
Batmanghelidj's ideas about water curing most disease have been criticised as quackery by medical experts. He also drew criticism for his HIV/AIDS denialism. Physician Harriet Hall has described Batmanghelidj as a "crank who believed dehydration is the main cause of disease. He promoted his Water Cure, which was not based on any scientific evidence."

His ideas have been criticised by Stephen Barrett, co-founder of the National Council Against Health Fraud and the webmaster of Quackwatch, on several grounds, including a lack of any documented peer-reviewed research and exaggerated claims about the number of patients treated successfully. He further questions that Batmanghelidj has practiced medicine in the United States, pointing to his lack of registration as a physician. He was licensed as a naturopath.

== Books ==
- Batmanghelidj, Fereydoon, How to Deal with Back Pain & Rheumatoid Joint Pain (1991), Global Health Solutions; ISBN 0-9629942-0-0
- Batmanghelidj, Fereydoon, Your Body's Many Cries for Water (1992), Global Health Solutions, ISBN 0-9629942-3-5
- Batmanghelidj, Fereydoon, Water: Rx for A Healthier, Pain-free Life (1997), Global Health Solutions; Cas&Bklt edition, ISBN 0-9629942-7-8
- Batmanghelidj, Fereydoon, ABC of Asthma, Allergies and Lupus: Eradicate Asthma – Now!, (2000), Global Health Solutions, ISBN 0-9629942-6-X
- Batmanghelidj, Fereydoon, Water For Health, For Healing, For Life (2003), Warner Books, ISBN 0-446-69074-0
- Batmanghelidj, Fereydoon, You're not sick, you're thirsty! (2003), Grand Central Publishing, ISBN 0-446-69074-0
- Batmanghelidj, Fereydoon, Water Cures: Drugs Kill: How Water Cured Incurable Diseases, (2003) Global Health Solutions, ISBN 0-9702458-1-5
- Batmanghelidj, Fereydoon, Obesity Cancer Depression; Their Common Cause & Natural Cure, (2005) Global Health Solutions; ISBN 0-9702458-2-3
