= Island (Rogers novel) =

1999 novel by Jane Rogers

- First edition
- Author: Jane Rogers
- Language: English
- Publisher: Little, Brown & Co.
- Publication date: 1999
- Publication place: United Kingdom
- Media type: Print (Hardback, Paperback)
- Pages: 272 pp
- ISBN: 0-316-85153-1

Island is a novel by Jane Rogers, first published in 1999. It is a contemporary novel set on an isolated Scottish island, partly inspired by Shakespeare's The Tempest. It uses folk tales and short episodes of brutal psychological realism to describe the mental transformation of an angry young woman.

The novel has been adapted for the film Island, which was released in 2011.

== Plot summary ==
Nikki Black, a disturbed and hate-filled young woman intent on punishing the mother who abandoned her at birth goes to the island with only one aim in mind: revenge. Her plans are confounded by the discovery that she has a brother, Calum: a brother strangely possessed by their mother; a brother with a terrifyingly violent streak; a brother whose dangerous love and strange way of seeing the world transform Nikki's life. The characters Calum and Phyllis are loosely based upon Caliban and Prospero.

== Publication history ==
- 1999, first published in Great Britain by Little, Brown and Company
- 2000, first paperback edition, published by Abacus
- 2007, republished
- 2008, reprinted: ISBN 978-0-349-11229-9
