= Batmanqelenj-e Sofla =

Batmanqelenj-e Sofla dehestan atash beyg باتمانقلنج سفلي
- village
- Location within Iran
- Coordinates: 37°31′26″N 46°33′04″E
- Country: Iran
- Province: East Azerbaijan
- County: Hashtrud
- Bakhsh: Nazarkahrizi
- Rural District: دهستان آتش بیگ قرانقو

Population (2024)
  - Total: 650
- Time zone: UTC+3:30 (IRST)
  - Summer (DST): UTC+4:30 (IRDT)

Batmanqelenj-e Sofla (Persian: باتمانقلنج سفلي, also Romanized as Bātmānqelenj-e Soflá; also known as Bātmānqelīch and Bātmānqelīch-e Soflá) is a village in دهستان آتش بیگ قرانقو, Nazarkahrizi District, Hashtrud County, East Azerbaijan Province, Iran. At the 2024 census, its population was650, in 158 families.
