= Jane Rogers (novelist) =

English novelist and scriptwriter (born 1952)

- Born: 21 July 1952 (age 74); London, England
- Occupation: Novelist

Jane Rogers (born 21 July 1952) is a British novelist, editor, scriptwriter, lecturer, and teacher. She is best known for her novels Mr. Wroe's Virgins and The Voyage Home. In 1994 Rogers was elected a Fellow of the Royal Society of Literature.

== Early life ==
Rogers was born in London on 21 July 1952. She was educated at Oxford High School, a private girls school in Oxford. She then matriculated into New Hall, Cambridge to study English. She graduated Bachelor of Arts (BA) in 1974. She went on to complete a Postgraduate Certificate in Education (PGCE) at the University of Leicester in 1976.

She now lives in Banbury.

== Career ==
Her novel The Testament of Jessie Lamb was longlisted for the Man Booker Prize and won the Arthur C. Clarke Award.

In November 2015, her adaptation of Dodie Smith's I Capture the Castle was broadcast on BBC Radio 4. It starred Holliday Grainger as Cassandra and Toby Jones as Mortmain.

== Bibliography ==
- Separate Tracks (1983, Faber)
- Her Living Image (1984, Faber)
- The Ice is Singing (1987, Faber)
- Mr. Wroe's Virgins (1991, Faber)
- Promised Lands (1995, Faber)
- Island (1999, Little Brown)
- The Voyage Home (2004, Little Brown)
- The Testament of Jessie Lamb (2011, Sandstone)
- Conrad and Eleanor (2016, Faber)

== Prizes and honours ==
=== Honors ===
- 1994 – Elected a Fellow of the Royal Society of Literature.

=== Literary awards ===
Year	Title	Award	Category	Result	Ref.
1985	Her Living Image	Somerset Maugham Award	—	Won	
1996	Promised Lands	Women's Prize for Fiction	—	Longlisted	
2000	Island	Women's Prize for Fiction	—	Longlisted	
2011	The Testament of Jessie Lamb	Kitschies	Red Tentacle (Novel)	Finalist	
2011	The Testament of Jessie Lamb	Man Booker Prize	—	Longlisted	
2012	The Testament of Jessie Lamb	Arthur C. Clarke Award	—	Won	
2013	Hitting Trees with Sticks	Edge Hill Short Story Prize	—	Shortlisted	
2013	Hitting Trees with Sticks	Frank O'Connor International Short Story Award	—	Longlisted	
