= Thomas Babe =

American playwright (1941–2000)

- Born: March 13, 1941; Buffalo, New York
- Died: December 6, 2000 (aged 59); Stamford, Connecticut
- Occupations: Playwright, screenwriter

Thomas Babe (March 13, 1941 – December 6, 2000) was an American playwright, "one of Joseph Papp's most prolific resident playwrights at the New York Shakespeare Festival," with seven of his plays premiered at the Public Theatre. His work during the mid-1970s and through the 1980s explored many elements of American history and cultural mythology. He was fascinated by the concept of the traditional hero figure—and the reality behind it.

== Early life and education ==
Thomas Babe was born in 1941 in Buffalo, New York, the son of Thomas James and Ruth Ina (née Lossie) Babe. He had two sisters, Mimi and Karen. Although he started writing at a young age, Babe did not go into theater until after earning other degrees at Harvard University, where he was Phi Beta Kappa; and Yale University Law School. He was a Marshall Scholar, attending the University of Cambridge in 1963.

== Career ==
Babe's works were regularly produced in New York City by Joseph Papp's Public Theater, as well as regional theaters across the country. As noted below, seven of his plays were premiered at the Public Theater, where Babe was a resident playwright. His first major success there was Kid Champion (1975), starring Christopher Walken as a former rock star.

In addition to exploring the concept of hero and its mythology, Babe often featured strained family relationships, specifically focusing on fathers and daughters, love and individual rights. These themes come together in Babe's 1977 play, A Prayer for My Daughter, starring Alan Rosenberg and Laurence Luckinbill, and directed by Robert Allan Ackerman. It was described as a "close-quartered, deeply psychological interrogation in a police station", that was "strange and compelling", and "unsuspectingly, delivers swift body punches."

Papp produced a series of his plays in the 1970s and 1980s, including Rebel Women (about the Civil War), Taken in Marriage with Meryl Streep, Colleen Dewhurst, Kathleen Quinlan, Elizabeth Wilson and Dixie Carter; and Buried Inside Extra, a newspaper drama starring Hal Holbrook and Sandy Dennis.

Planet Fires, premiered in 1985 in Rochester, New York for the opening of Geva Theatre Center's new theatre. It was set at a campground near Rochester, at the end of the American Civil War, dealing "provocatively with American history and with questions of freedom, choice and loyalty." It featured a newly freed slave and a Union deserter, who encounter in spirit (and on stage) major figures of the day, such as Frederick Douglass and Susan B. Anthony. Mel Gussow, theater critic for the New York Times, described it as one of Babe's most striking works since A Prayer for My Daughter.

In a letter to The Times in 1982, Mr. Babe said that working in the theater requires "stamina, patience, concern and some little indifference to the passing fancies of each season." He added: "The startling vanishment of the playwright is not only a fact, but his and her persistence in an era of incivility and social chaos is something of a miracle. Celebration is in order."

== Personal life ==
He married Susan Bramhall in 1967, and they had a daughter Charissa before their later divorce. In later life, Babe lived in Darien, Connecticut with his companion Neal Bell, a playwright. Babe died of lung cancer at the age of 59 on December 6, 2000, in a hospice in Stamford, Connecticut. His mother, sisters, and daughter Charissa Pacella survived him.

== Plays and premiere dates ==
- The Pageant of Awkward Shadows, Harvard College Theater, Cambridge, MA, 1963
- Kid Champion, Public Theater, New York City, 1974
- Mojo Candy, Yale Cabaret, New Haven, CT, 1975
- Rebel Women, Public Theater, 1976'
- Billy Irish, Manhattan Theater Club, New York City, 1976
- A Prayer for My Daughter, Public Theater, 1978
- Great Solo Town, Yale Cabaret, 1977
- Fathers and Sons, Public Theater, 1978
- Taken in Marriage, Public Theater, 1979
- Salt Lake City Skyline, Public Theater, 1980
- When We Were Very Young, Winter Garden Theatre, New York City, 1980
- Buried Inside Extra, Public Theater, 1984
- Planet Fires, Geva Theatre Center, Rochester, NY, 1985
- Carrying School Children, Theatre for the New City, New York City, 1987
- Demon Wine, Los Angeles Theatre Center, Los Angeles, CA, 1987
- Junk Bonds, Denver Center for the Performing Arts, Denver, CO, 1991
- Great Day In The Morning, South Coast Repertory, Costa Mesa, CA, 1993, published by Broadway Play Publishing Inc.

== Screenplays ==
- The Sun Gods, Warner Bros., 1978 (With Michael Wadleigh)
- The Vacancy, Warner Bros., 1979
- Kid Champion, Music Fair, Inc., 1979

== Radio plays ==
- Hot Dogs and Soda Pop, National Public Radio (NPR), 1980
- The Volunteer Fireman, NPR, 1981
- One For the Record, WNYC's The Radio Stage (Marjorie Van Halteren, Producer), 1984

== Television ==
- Ryan's Hope, and Another World

== Opera librettos ==
- Tesla, a multimedia opera composed by Carson Kievman
- The Cursed Daunsers, music by Alfred Guzzetti
