= Alan Yentob =

British television executive and presenter (1947–2025)

Alan Yentob CBE
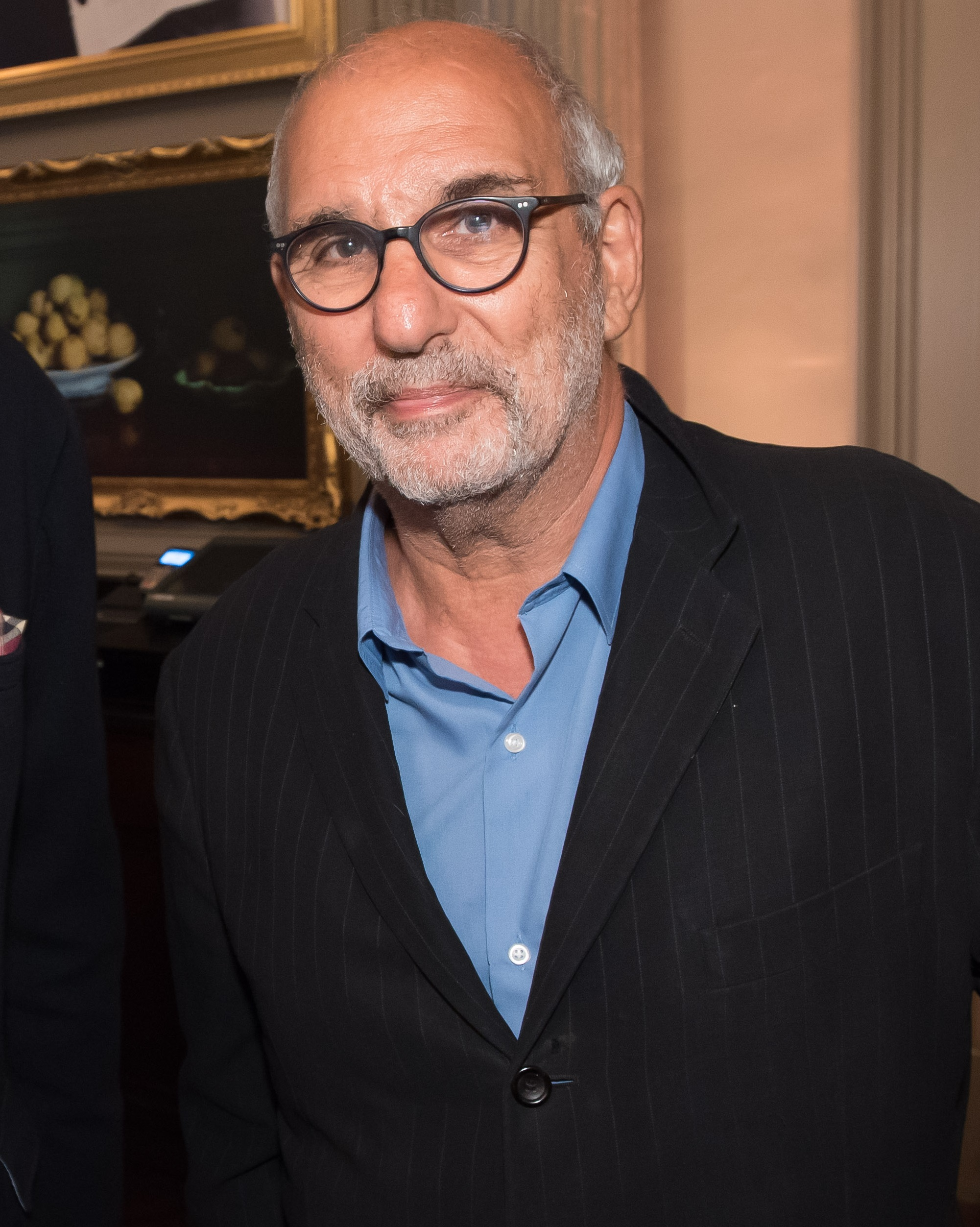
- Yentob in 2017
- Born: 11 March 1947; Stepney, London, England
- Died: 24 May 2025 (aged 78)
- Education: University of Leeds
- Occupation: Television executive; presenter
- Years active: 1968–2025
- Employer: BBC
- Known for: Controller of BBC2 (1987–1993); Controller of BBC1 (1993–1996)
- Spouse: Philippa Walker (m. 2020)
- Children: 2

Alan Yentob (11 March 1947 – 24 May 2025) was a British television executive and presenter. He held senior roles at the BBC, including head of music and arts, controller of BBC1 and BBC2, and was the corporation's creative director from 2004 until 2015. He was also chairman of the board of trustees of the charity Kids Company from 2003 until its collapse in 2015.

== Early life ==
Yentob was born into an Iraqi Jewish family in Stepney, London, the son of Flora Esther (née Khazam) and Isaac Reuben Yentob. Soon after he was born, his family moved to Manchester where his father was in business with his wife's family, the Khazams. One example of this collaboration were sales of shares in Haighton Holdings in 1951 involving his mother, father and uncle Nadji Khazam. Together they were involved in the UK with various other textile manufacturers plus wholesalers such as Spencer, Turner & Boldero and Jeremiah Rotherham & Co. The families also had dealings in South Africa with their holding company Anglo-African Investments. The public companies were eventually shed and a few consolidated into Dewhurst Dent, in which Alan Yentob still owned a 10% share.

Yentob grew up in Didsbury, a suburb of Manchester and returned to London with his family when he was 12 to live in a flat on Park Lane. He was a boarder at the independent school King's Ely in Cambridgeshire. He passed his A-levels in French, English and History, getting Bs, studied at the Sorbonne in Paris, and spent a year at the University of Grenoble. He went on to study Law at the University of Leeds, where he became involved in student drama. He graduated with a lower second class degree (2:2) in 1968.

== Career ==
Yentob joined the BBC as a trainee in the BBC World Service in 1968 as its only non-Oxbridge graduate of that year. Nine months later he moved into BBC Television to become an assistant director on arts programmes.

In 1973, Yentob became a producer and director, working on the high-profile documentary series Omnibus, for which, in 1975, he made a film called Cracked Actor about the musician David Bowie. In 1975, he helped initiate another BBC documentary series, Arena, of which he was editor from 1978 until 1985. The series returned, for semi-regular editions, until the present day.

Yentob left Arena to become the BBC's head of music and arts, a position he occupied until 1987, when he was promoted to controller of BBC2, one of the youngest channel controllers in the BBC's history. Under Yentob's six-year stewardship he introduced programmes such as The Late Show, Have I Got News for You and Absolutely Fabulous.

In 1993, Yentob was promoted to controller of BBC1, responsible for the output of the BBC's premier channel. During his tenure he commissioned the dramas Middlemarch, Pride and Prejudice and Ballykissangel, and cancelled the soap opera Eldorado. He remained in the post until 1996, when he was promoted again to become BBC Television's overall director of programmes. This appointment was only a brief one, before a re-organisation of the BBC's executive committee led to the creation of a new post, filled by Yentob, of director of drama, entertainment and children's. This placed Yentob in overall supervision of the BBC's output in these three genres across all media – radio, television and Internet. He occupied this post until June 2004, when new BBC director-general Mark Thompson re-organised the BBC's executive committee and promoted Yentob to the new post of BBC creative director, responsible for overseeing BBC creative output across television, radio and interactive services.

Yentob also began to present BBC programmes, which included a series on the life of Leonardo da Vinci and, from 2003, a new regular arts series, Imagine. One episode of Imagine had Yentob explore the World Wide Web, blogging, user-created content, and even the use of English Wikipedia, exploring people's motives and satisfaction that can be had from sharing information on such a large scale. In 2007, Yentob appeared as the 'host' of the satirical Imagine a Mildly Amusing Panel Show, a spoof Imagine... episode focused on the comedy panel game show Never Mind the Buzzcocks.

According to The Times, Yentob's reputation was affected when it was revealed that his participation in some of the interviews for Imagine had been faked. In 2007, it was reported that the programme inserted noddies featuring Yentob into interviews that he did not conduct, creating the impression that he had been present. Yentob was warned not to do this again, but otherwise not disciplined, much to the disgruntlement of some who had seen more junior staff lose their jobs for lesser misdemeanours. This controversy was covered in some newspapers as Noddygate.

On 17 March 2010, Yentob and Nigella Lawson opened the Jewish Museum London in Camden Town.

In July 2009, Yentob was revealed to have accumulated a pension worth £6.3m, giving an annual retirement income of £216,667 for the rest of his life. This was one of the biggest pensions in the public sector. He earned £200,000 – £249,999 as a BBC contributor and presenter. He was paid a declared salary of £183,000 by the BBC, but additional income from the BBC for presenting and other roles was reputed to earn him an extra £150,000, bringing his BBC income to an estimated £330,000.

Yentob was on the board of trustees of the Architecture Foundation. He was involved with several charities, including the posts of chairman and trustee of Kids Company.

Yentob resigned as the BBC's creative director on 3 December 2015 in the wake of allegations that he had sought to influence the BBC's coverage of the Kids Company scandal.

== Kids Company ==
Yentob's role as chairman of the board of trustees for Kids Company, as well as the founder Camila Batmanghelidjh, came under close scrutiny following the collapse of the charity in early August 2015. He was accused of multiple shortcomings in oversight and financial management and of failing to ensure that he avoided a conflict of interest with his position at the BBC. It was alleged that he intervened there in an attempt to deflect criticism of Kids Company and its founder Batmanghelidjh. Yentob vigorously defended his actions and stated in August 2015 that he was "not remotely considering" resigning over his behaviour. However, he resigned on 3 December 2015.

=== Interventions at the BBC ===
Yentob acknowledged that he had stood in the studio of the Today programme while Batmanghelidjih was being interviewed in July, later saying that he had wished to hear what she had to say and had not been attempting to intimidate staff. He also telephoned a senior member of staff at Newsnight, asking the programme to "delay a report critical of financial management at Kids Company", and telephoned the Radio 4 presenter Edward Stourton before a report in The World at One. The BBC Trust, under chairwoman Rona Fairhead, investigated these interventions, although senior BBC management were reported to have reassured the Trust that they had not compromised editorial independence at the BBC.

=== "Descent into savagery" ===
Yentob acknowledged signing an email from Kids Company to the government which sought millions in further funding by suggesting certain communities in London might "descend into savagery" if Kids Company ceased its operations. The email, which was subsequently leaked to BuzzFeed News and the BBC's Newsnight programme, spoke of "looting, rioting and arson attacks on government buildings" and warned of possible sharp spikes in "starvation and modern-day slavery". It said that these concerns were "not hypothetical, but based on a deep understanding of the socio-psychological background that these children operate within". Yentob said this email "was not intended in any way as a threat".

=== Appearance before select committee ===
On 15 October 2015, Yentob and Batmanghelidjh made a joint appearance before a parliamentary select committee investigating the charity's collapse. Their performance was widely described as disastrous. In the New Statesman, the political commentator Anoosh Chakelian said they were a "duo of epically proportioned egos" who made "as little sense – and as many accusations – as possible" before the panel of MPs. In The Daily Telegraph, the parliamentary sketch writer Michael Deacon called their appearance the "single weirdest event in recent parliamentary history" and wrote of "three solid hours of bewildering excuses, recriminations and non-sequiturs".

=== Criticism from PACAC ===
The Commons Public Administration and Constitutional Affairs Committee report heavily criticised Yentob. He was described as someone who condoned excessive spending and lacked proper attention to his duties. The BBC was also accused of poor leadership for failing to take action against him when he tried to make suggestions about the BBC's reporting of Kids Company.

== Later career ==
Yentob was the Creative Director and Board Director of Two Daughters Entertainment at the time of his death. As Executive Producer on the upcoming animated feature The Land of Sometimes, Yentob brought in Mel Brooks and songwriter Sir Tim Rice.

== Personal life ==
Yentob was in a relationship with Philippa Walker, a television producer, for over 40 years. The couple had a son and a daughter. They married in 2020. In September 2006, his son was stabbed during a robbery on the doorstep of the family's four-storey home in Notting Hill and received stitches.

In 2005, Yentob was awarded an Honorary Doctor of Letters from De Montfort University, Leicester. He was appointed Commander of the Order of the British Empire (CBE) in the 2024 Birthday Honours for services to the arts and media.

Yentob was a friend of Salman Rushdie and spoke to him for the 2024 BBC programme Salman Rushdie: Through a Glass Darkly, which featured Rushdie's account of being stabbed multiple times by an attacker in New York State.

== Death and tributes ==
Yentob died on 24 May 2025, aged 78.

BBC director-general Tim Davie paid tribute, calling Yentob "a creative force and a cultural visionary" and saying he "shaped decades of programming at the BBC and beyond, with a passion for storytelling and public service that leave a lasting legacy". BBC Radio 4 Today presenter Amol Rajan described him as "such a unique and kind man: an improbable impresario from unlikely origins who became a towering figure in the culture of postwar Britain". Comedian David Baddiel described him as a "king of TV" and Pet Shop Boys said he was "a legend in British TV, responsible for some of the BBC's finest programmes."

== In popular culture ==
Yentob was portrayed by Omar Ebrahim in the 2017 operetta Committee, about parliamentary committee hearings into the events surrounding Kids Company, with music by Tom Deering and text by Josie Rourke and Hadley Fraser.

Media offices
Preceded by Jonathan Powell	Controller of BBC1; 1993–1996	Succeeded by Michael Jackson
Preceded by Graeme MacDonald	Controller of BBC2; 1987–1993	Succeeded by Michael Jackson
