= Sarah Falk =

British court of appeal judge

The Right Honourable Lady Justice Falk DBE
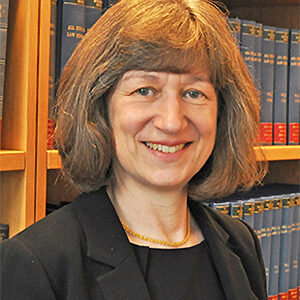
- Falk in 2022

Lady Justice of Appeal
- Incumbent
- Assumed office 14 November 2022
- Monarch: Charles III

High Court Judge Chancery Division
- In office 1 October 2018 – 2022
- Monarchs: Elizabeth II; Charles III

Personal details
- Born: Sarah Valerie Falk; 1 June 1962 (age 64)
- Education: Sidney Sussex College, Cambridge

Dame Sarah Valerie Falk, DBE PC (born 1 June 1962) is a British Court of Appeal judge. She was previously a High Court judge and senior Judicial Appointments Commissioner.

== Career ==
Falk studied law at Sidney Sussex College, Cambridge, and was admitted as a solicitor in 1986. Specialising in corporate tax she became a partner in Freshfields in 1994, notably working on the corporate restructure of EMI in 2011.

During her career at Freshfields, Falk noted she experienced sexism despite being a partner. In an interview, she said during her time there she would often be the only female attending meetings and her male colleagues in those meetings would demonstrate selective hearing, with a male colleague repeating a point she had made earlier which then would be treated as a good idea.

In 2015 she was appointed as a deputy judge of the Upper Tribunal (Tax and Chancery Chamber) having left Freshfields partnership while still working on a consultancy basis until 2018.

=== High Court appointment ===
On 1 October 2018 she was appointed as a High Court judge. She received the customary Damehood in 2019.

On 1 October 2019, she was appointed as a Judicial Commissioner of the Judicial Appointments Commission. She retired from the post on 30 September 2022.

=== Court of Appeal and Privy Council appointment ===
Her appointment to the Court of Appeal was announced on 2 November 2022. On 14 December 2022 Falk was appointed to the Privy Council, entitling her to the style The Right Honourable for life.

== Personal life ==
Falk married Marcus Flint in 1985, she has one son and one daughter. She has an interest in classical music, dog walking and horse riding.

She acted as chair of the ProCorda Trust, a youth music organisation, between 2008 and 2018.
