= Kirsty Williams (drama) =

Scottish radio drama director and producer

Kirsty Williams is a radio drama director and producer for BBC Radio Drama at Pacific Quay, Glasgow.

Plays written by Oliver Emanuel that she directed have received several awards: Daniel and Mary received a Bronze Sony Radio Academy Award for Best Drama in 2010, A History of Paper was shortlisted for the Tinniswood Award 2017, When The Pips Stop won the Tinniswood Award in 2019, and The Truth About Hawaii won the BBC Audio Drama Award for Best Original Series or Serial in 2019.

== Radio Plays ==
Radio Plays Directed or Produced by Kirsty Williams
Date first broadcast	Play	Author	Cast	Synopsis Awards	Station Series
2 January 2006	Billy	Kenneth Steven	Read by Paul Blair	Stories showcasing new Scottish writing. A young Celtic supporter gets a life-changing job with a fanatical Rangers fan.	BBC Radio 4 Scottish Shorts
2 May 2006 – 5 May 2006	The Caliph's House – A Year in Casablanca	Tahir Shah abridged by Laurence Wareing	Read by Shiv Grewal	Frustrated with his cramped London lifestyle, travel writer Tahir Shah decides to set up home in Morocco. But, when he buys the Caliph's house, he and his family discover they've got more than they'd bargained for: the property is looked after by three guardians who are convinced the house is full of ill-tempered jinns who don't want a new owner moving in on their territory.	BBC Radio 4 Book of the Week
21 August 2006 – 1 September 2006	Belonging	Ron Butlin	Read by Simon Donaldson	A dark and gripping contemporary psychological thriller about Scottish drifter, Jack McCall – that takes us from the ski slopes of France to a Spanish wilderness.	BBC Radio 4 Book at Bedtime
6 October 2006	The Good Shepherd	Laura Marney	Read by James Fleet	When a church is threatened with closure, the pastor sets out on a recruitment drive and meets the most unlikely would-be parishioner.	BBC Radio 4
1 January 2007	Housework	Sally Beamish	Read by Joanna Tope	Stories showcasing new Scottish writing. A woman's life is turned upside down when her husband leaves her.	BBC Radio 4 Scottish Shorts
18 January 2007	The No. 1 Ladies' Detective Agency, Series 3, Part 1: How to Handle Men through the Application of Psychology	Alexander McCall Smith	Claire Benedict, Nadine Marshall, Joseph Marcell, Janice Acquah, Adjoa Andoh, Gbemisola Ikumelo, Chuk Iwuji and Kedar Williams-Stirling	Precious Ramotswe, owner and founder of The No. 1 Ladies' Detective Agency, sets out to release her fiancé, Mr JLB Matekoni, from a terrifying obligation. Meanwhile, a new case comes into the agency, and the ladies find themselves on a love quest.	BBC Radio 4 Afternoon Play
25 January 2007	The No. 1 Ladies' Detective Agency, Series 3, Part 2: House of Hope	Alexander McCall Smith	Claire Benedict, Nadine Marshall, Joseph Marcell, Janice Acquah, Jude Akuwudike and Noma Dumezweni	Mma Ramotswe and her assistant Mma Makutsi visit some bad girls in their quest to find a husband for their client. But Mma Ramotswe has some marriage problems of her own. When her fiancé seems no closer to setting a date for their wedding, she seeks the advice of a crafty friend.	BBC Radio 4 Afternoon Play
1 February 2007	The No. 1 Ladies' Detective Agency, Series 3, Part 3: The Return of Note	Alexander McCall Smith	Claire Benedict, Nadine Marshall, Janice Acquah, Jude Akuwudike, Adjoa Andoh, Chuk Iwuji, Alibe Parsons, Danny Sapani and Ben Thomas	Mma Ramotswe finds herself in a compromising situation when her past catches up with her. But things are looking brighter for her assistant, Mma Makutsi, when she takes up ballroom dancing.	BBC Radio 4 Afternoon Play
8 February 2007	The No. 1 Ladies' Detective Agency, Series 3, Part 4: The Ceremony	Alexander McCall Smith	Claire Benedict, Nadine Marshall, Joseph Marcell, Janice Acquah, Jude Akuwudike, Nikki Amuka-Bird, Patrice Naiambana and Danny Sapani	With her agency work under control, Mma Ramotswe has time at last to take care of her own problems. Can she release her fiancé, Mr JLB Matekoni, from his rash undertaking to do a charity parachute jump? And will the return of an old love jeopardise her plan to spring a romantic surprise on her husband-to-be?	BBC Radio 4 Afternoon Play
15 February 2007	The Places In Between	Rory Stewart dramatised by Benjamin Yeoh	Greg Wise, Mido Hamada, Omar Berdouni, Nayef Rashed, Nitin Ganatra, Emun Elliott and Tahmoures Tehrani	In January 2002, Rory Stewart walked across Afghanistan just after the fall of the Taliban. Surviving by his wits, his knowledge of Persian dialects and Muslim customs, and the kindness of strangers, this dramatisation tells the story of this epic journey.	BBC Radio 4 Afternoon Play
23 April 2007	Coconut Chaos	Diana Souhami	Read by Eleanor Bron	Diana Souhami's story interweaves her voyage to Pitcairn Island with the dark and compelling tale of the island's history.	BBC Radio 4 Book of the Week
30 July 2007	Be Prepared: The Amateur Assassin	Conn Iggulden	Read by Paul Young	Stories inspired by the motto of the Scouting movement. A clothing retailer accidentally finds himself embroiled in the murder business.	BBC Radio 4 Afternoon Reading
31 July 2007	Be Prepared: The Dog Watch	Candia McWilliam	Read by Tamara Kennedy	To mark the centenary of the Scouting movement, a series of stories inspired by their famous motto. A couple tipsily celebrate their wedding anniversary.	BBC Radio 4 Afternoon Reading
1 August 2007	Be Prepared: Imagine	Pauline McLynn	Read by Joanna Tope	To mark the centenary of the Scouting movement, a series of stories inspired by their famous motto. A woman shows the most incredible capacity to look on the bright side.	BBC Radio 4 Afternoon Reading
2 August 2007	Be Prepared: Man's Best Friend	Des Dillon	Read by Nick Underwood	Series of stories inspired by the famous motto of the Scouting movement. The dark story of a futuristic Britain in which dogs sniff out terrorist threats.	BBC Radio 4 Afternoon Reading
3 August 2007	Be Prepared: Vanishing Point	Luke Sutherland	Read by Sandy Grierson	To mark the centenary of the Scouting movement, a series of stories inspired by their famous motto. A very small man intervenes in a scene similar to a nursery rhyme and helps a young lady in distress.	BBC Radio 4 Afternoon Reading
14 August 2007	Cut to the Heart	Nicola Wilson	Mark Bonnar, Sally Hawkins, Anastasia Hille, Georgia Rich, Mark Emerson and Richard Dillane	When Ted leaves Alice for her best friend, it takes ten years for the ripples of betrayal to die down.	BBC Radio 4 Afternoon Play
15 October 2007 – 26 October 2007	The Tenderness of Wolves	Stef Penney dramatised by Chris Dolan	Meg Fraser, Michael Goldsmith, Lewis Howden, Iain Robertson, Lucy Paterson, Nick Underwood, Simon Tait, Steven Cartwright, Richard Greenwood and Angus MacInnes	1860s Canada. Mrs Ross' son has been missing since the day she discovered the murdered body of her neighbour – she fears her errant son will be blamed, so she treks through the wilderness in a bid to save him.	BBC Radio 4 Woman's Hour Drama
9 January 2008	Jimmy Murphy Makes Amends	Andrew Doyle	David Ireland, Iain Robertson, James Bryce, Gabriel Quigley, Jill Riddiford and Una McLean	Black comedy about friendship and the fear of God. Desperate to save himself from eternal damnation, Jimmy sets out to make amends for all his wrongdoings, only to discover a truth far more terrifying than divine retribution.	BBC Radio 4 Afternoon Play
25 January 2008	My Heart's in the Highlands	Liz Lochhead	Siobhan Redmond, Lewis Howden and Ann Scott Jones	Roberta's had a strange year, but things are about to get stranger when, preparing a Burns Supper, the man himself turns up in her kitchen.	BBC Radio Scotland Drama
14 February 2008	A Most Civil Arrangement	Colin Hough	Barbara Rafferty	A comedy monologue about a downtrodden woman preparing for her daughter's unconventional wedding. The antidote to Valentine's Day.	BBC Radio Scotland Drama
3 March 2008 – 7 March 2008	My Father's Country	Wibke Bruhns	Read by Joanna Tope	Wibke Bruhns's chronicle of the life of her father, who was executed in 1944 for failing to disclose a plot to assassinate Hitler. This family history offers an intimate insight into the experience of being German during a turbulent century.	BBC Radio 4 Book of the Week
14 April 2008 – 25 April 2008	The Good Soldier	Ford Madox Ford abridged by Lu Kemp	Read by Toby Stephens	Ford Madox Ford's classic tale of passion and deceit, set in Europe during the early years of the 20th century. The story centres on a friendship between two seemingly happily married couples and the web of deception woven around a long-standing affair.	BBC Radio 4 Book at Bedtime
21 August 2008	Sex for Volunteers	Laura Marney and David Ramos Fernandes	Molly Innes, Robin Laing, Louise Ludgate, Steven McNicoll, Stewart Porter and Sally Reid	When Suzy's husband takes a job abroad, her sister encourages her to join a team of first-aiders. However, her plans for Suzy go well beyond the kiss of life.	BBC Radio 4 Afternoon Play
9 September 2008	Blue Sky Thinking	Ben Lewis	Nicola Stapleton, Samuel Roukin, Freddy White, Catherine Shepherd, Sandra Voe and Ben Lewis	Karen's counting down the days to her wedding. But when a scrawny-looking stranger turns up, her happy life begins to fall apart.	BBC Radio 4 Afternoon Play
29 October 2008	MacBeth's MacPets	Morna Pearson	Ann Scott Jones, Sheila Donaldson, Ralph Riach and Ashley Smith	Surreal comedy about a pet shop that stocks grannies.	BBC Radio Scotland Drama
13 November 2008	Quartet	Donna Franceschild	Gerry Mulgrew, Callum Cuthbertson, Stephen McCole and Katy Murphy	With his life empty, save for dreams of former glory as a jazz musician, music teacher Robbie accidentally gains a jazz quartet.	BBC Radio 4 Afternoon Play
3 December 2008	Once I Loved You Long Ago	Louise Ironside	Mary Gapinski	Comedy-drama about a woman who leaves her husband after reading someone else's love letters.	BBC Radio Scotland Drama
7 January 2009	Kyoto	David Greig	Matthew Pidgeon and Samantha Young	Drama about sexual desire, hotel rooms and climate change.	BBC Radio Scotland Drama
18 February 2009	The Lottery Ticket	Donna Franceschild	Nitzan Sharron, John Kazek and Meg Fraser	An unlikely friendship blossoms when an asylum seeker and a migrant worker find a stray lottery ticket and think it may be the answer to all their problems.	BBC Radio 4 Afternoon Play
7 March 2009	The Meek	Denise Mina; Sound design: Paul Wilson and Dan Lyth	Meg Fraser, Sarah Gordy, Lucy Paterson, Louise Ludgate, Robert Softley, Ben Lewis and Nick Underwood	Newborn Simone has Down's syndrome but her mother is convinced she has extraordinary powers. Is this complete fantasy or is Simone really in a world where superheroes exist and are being hunted down?	BBC Radio 3 The Wire
16 March 2009	Where Three Roads Meet	Salley Vickers	John Hurt, Paul Rhys, Sylvestra Le Touzel, John Rowe and Jonathan Tafler	A strange, unworldly figure appears in Sigmund Freud's Hampstead study to present the truth behind the Oedipus myth that the founder of psychoanalysis so famously made his own.	BBC Radio 4 Afternoon Play
26 March 2009	Gondwanaland	Stephen Keyworth	Meg Fraser, Nick Underwood, Rosalind Sydney, Lucy Paterson, Crawford Logan and James Anthony Pearson	Drama inspired by the friendship between family planning pioneer Marie Stopes and explorer Captain Robert Scott.	BBC Radio 4 Afternoon Play
18 June 2009	Desperate Measures	David Ian Neville	Gabriel Quigley, Neil McKinven, Daniela Nardini, Molly Innes, Nicola Jo Cully and Phil McKee	In an old warehouse by the River Clyde, Paul and Mhairi Blaze have built a successful design company. But as the economic downturn bites, they need more than grand designs to save their business and their relationship.	BBC Radio 4 Afternoon Play
3 July 2009	Spam Fritters	Jo Clifford	Sheila Donald, Maynard Eziashi, John Kielty and Melody Grove	A Glasgow grandmother develops an online relationship with a Russian woman who's actually a Nigerian man.	BBC Radio Scotland Drama
25 August 2009	The Incomplete Works of Dave McCabe	Nick Underwood	Simon Donaldson, Sandy Grierson, Claire Knight, Lorraine M McIntosh, Ann Scott-Jones and Finlay Welsh	Singer-songwriter Dave is given the opportunity to meet his muse and woo her with a song. But he has a problem: he cannot get past the opening lines.	BBC Radio 4 Afternoon Play
8 September 2009	Meryl the Mounted	Colin Hough	Rosalind Sydney, Scott Fletcher, Robert Jack, Una McLean, Sean Scanlan and James Young	Meryl is a mounted police constable with an unhealthy love for her horse; Aiden is a young stable boy with an unhealthy love for Meryl. When their sergeant is found murdered, the pair investigates.	BBC Radio 4 Afternoon Play
9 October 2009	Daniel and Mary	Oliver Emanuel	Robin Laing and Natasha Watson	A frank and moving drama exploring alcoholism from a child's point of view. Mary's nine years old. When she comes down to breakfast to find her dad is still up from the night before and still drinking vodka, she decides it's time to leave home. Bronze Sony Award for Best Drama 2010	BBC Radio Scotland Drama
22 December 2009	The Three Knots	Linda Cracknell	Finn den Hertog, Robert Jack, Gerda Stevenson, Hannah Donaldson and Jimmy Chisholm	Two men stranded on a mountain on a stormy December night in 19th-century Scotland meet a mysterious old woman who believes she can control the elements.	BBC Radio 4 Afternoon Play
26 December 2009	Educating Rita	Willy Russell	Laura Dos Santos and Bill Nighy	A comic, sparky and touching portrayal of the relationship between a working-class Open University student and her middle-aged, alcohol-fuelled tutor.	BBC Radio 4 Saturday Play
12 January 2010	My Romantic History	D C Jackson	Sandy Grierson, Cora Bissett, Gabriel Quigley, Jordan Young and Juliet Cadzow	Poignant and witty drama about love and memory.	BBC Radio 4 Afternoon Play
19 January 2010	The Lonely	Paul Gallico dramatised by Rebecca Hughes	Michael Goldsmith, Laura Rees, Sam Dale, Tracy Wiles and Piers Wehner	During the Second World War, an American airforce lieutenant suffering from battle fatigue and a young English WAAF officer become lovers. But when he returns to America to break off his engagement, things get complicated.	BBC Radio 4 Afternoon Play
26 January 2010	The Ca'd'oro Cafe	Donna Franceschild	Elspeth Brodie, Robin Laing and John Kazek	Dark and moving comedy about love, money and desperation	BBC Radio 4 Afternoon Play
20 February 2010	Life on the Edges	Nicola Wilson	Sheila Reid, Billy Seymour, Toby Jones, Laura Dos Santos and Nigel Hastings	Deano's never met his grandmother, Ellen. But his mother has committed suicide, and he's been placed in her care. Alone together, they each occupy their own imaginary worlds. Ellen sees things - a bear in a white anorak, Victorian chimney sweeps, the disembodied head of Ian Beale. Deano, used to spending hours on his computer, is missing the imaginary world he created on Second Life. Then his avatar turns up in his new bedroom and their adventures begin again. When Deano and Ellen's imaginary worlds collide, a dark and tragic tale unfolds.	BBC Radio 3 The Wire
28 February 2010	La Princesse de Clèves	Madame de Lafayette translated and freely dramatised by Jo Clifford	Melody Grove, Candida Benson, Liam Brennan, Robin Laing, Laurie Brown, Meg Fraser, Irene MacDougall, Ralph Riach and Crawford Logan	Set in the 16th Century, the play follows the life of a beautiful young lady newly presented to Court. It's the reign of Henri II and Mary Queen of Scots is safely ensconced in France. It's a time of dangerous liaisons when one step out of line could ruin a woman and her family.	BBC Radio 3 Drama on 3
7 March 2010	Of Mice and Men	John Steinbeck dramatised by Donna Franceschild	David Tennant, Liam Brennan, Jude Akuwudike, Christopher Fairbank, Melody Grove, Neil McKinven and Richard Madden	Dramatisation of John Steinbeck's 1937 novel about migrant workers in 1930s California whose dream of one day owning a place of their own is tragically destroyed.	BBC Radio 4 Classic Serial
29 March 2010 – 9 April 2010	Dancing Backwards	Salley Vickers	Read by Eileen Atkins	Violet Hetherington's husband has recently died. Alone, she decides to take a cruise-ship crossing to visit her old friend, Edwin, in New York. As she journeys across the Atlantic the quiet Violet begins to blossom.	BBC Radio 4 Book at Bedtime
4 June 2010	Personal Best	Lesley Hart	Sally Reid	A dark and surreal drama set almost entirely inside the mind of a runner during a half-marathon. Ruth's done this race before, she raised over £500 for a cause that's close to her heart. This year, she'll double that, but only if she beats her best ever time. It's the race of her life, and she's in the lead, until her mind begins to wander.	BBC Radio Scotland Drama
11 June 2010	Philip and Sydney	Alan Pollock	Pip Carter, Tim McInnerny, Melody Grove, John Rowe, Sam Dale and Gunnar Cauthery	In This Be The Verse, Philip Larkin famously bemoans the impact parents have on their children. Philip and Sydney uncovers some of the reasons why Larkin may have had such a profound sense of anguish.	BBC Radio 4 Afternoon Play
23 July 2010	No Help When Dead	David Ashton	David Ashton, Angela Darcy, Finn den Hertog, Steven McNicoll and Wendy Seager	A state of the nation play set during a Paisley pub's first ever poetry slam. As an ultra-nationalist and an ultra-morbid poet prepare to compete against a scantily clad Biblical-rapper, a man professing to be William McGonagall arrives to take stock of Scotland's brave new lyrical world.	BBC Radio Scotland Drama
30 July 2010	Trouble and Shame	David Ireland	Gary Lewis, Robert Jack and Veronica Leer	Hunter's a Glaswegian with big plans for Northern Ireland. The First Minister and the Deputy First Minister are from opposite ends of the political spectrum and they're not getting on, but Hunter thinks he knows how to help. The answer is to kidnap them.	BBC Radio Scotland Drama
4 September 2010	Translations	Brian Friel adapted for radio by Michael Duke	Samuel Barnett, Mark Bazeley, John Paul Connolly, Dermot Crowley, Roisin Gallagher, David Ireland, Aoife McMahon, Gerard McSorley, Eugene O'Hare and Eileen Walsh	It's the summer of 1833. In a hedge-school in Donegal, the schoolmaster's prodigal son is about to return from Dublin. With him are two army officers. Their aim is to create a map of the area, and, in the process, replace the Irish place-names with English equivalents. It's an act with unexpected and violent consequences.	BBC Radio 4 Saturday Play
6 September 2010	The Cracks	Rob Evans	James Anthony Pearson, Liam Brennan and Paul Thomas Hickey	Michael's a teenager who feels like his life's about to begin. He's travelling from Leeds to London for a date with a guy he's met online. David's a forty-year-old man who feels like he might be over the hill. When his partner announces he's leaving, David's life finally caves in. Michael and David's worlds are about to collide as each wanders Soho on a quest that will change them forever.	BBC Radio 4 Afternoon Play
17 September 2010	Tiny	Ben Lewis	Joshua Jenkins, Julia McKenzie, Mark Heap, Peter Marinker and Alison Pettitt	A nervous young man lives at the dead end of a dead-end town. On his eighteenth birthday, he comes into his inheritance. With a little help from an old teacher, he finds it equips him to broadcast over the internet.	BBC Radio 4 Afternoon Play
23 September 2010	The Second Mr Bailey (Note: Producer: Kirsty Williams; Director: Bruce Young)	Andrew Doyle	Sam Swann, Richard Greenwood, Owen Whitelaw, Gerda Stevenson, Gabriel Quigley and James Bryce	John is a young gay man living in Edinburgh in 1967. Homosexuality is about to be legalised in England, but not in Scotland. When John takes up lodgings with the enigmatic Mrs Margaret Bailey, he begins to experience what life as a conventional straight man could be like. But Margaret is no ordinary housewife; she's slowly turning John into a replica of her husband. And John's beginning to like it.	BBC Radio 4 Afternoon Play
30 October 2010	The Vanishing	Tim Krabbé dramatised by Oliver Emanuel	Samuel West, Melody Grove, Ruth Gemmell, Liam Brennan, Natasha Watson, Claire Knight and Robin Laing	Rex and Saskia stop at a petrol station. Saskia goes in to buy drinks and is never seen again. Eight years later, Rex is so haunted by her disappearance that he sets out to discover what happened to her, regardless of the cost. A chilling love story that takes us to the heart of the perfect crime.	BBC Radio 4 Saturday Play
19 December 2011	Down and Out in Auchangaish	Donna Franceschild	Liam Brennan, Wendy Seager, Kyle McPhail, David Ireland, Lesley Hart, Simon Tait and Robin Laing	Cal's about to turn eighteen, and he's sleeping rough. Ziggy keeps setting fire to his hotel. And Gino, the local chip shop owner, wants to help everyone. Everyone except his wife, that is.	BBC Radio 4 Afternoon Play
13 August 2012 – 17 August 2012	The Other One	Oliver Emanuel	Natasha Watson, Frances Grey, Robin Laing, Meg Fraser and Finlay Welsh	A tense and moving drama inspired by real events. A twelve-year-old girl's world turns upside down when she is told an unbelievable truth	BBC Radio 4 Woman's Hour Drama
16 January 2015	Take Me to the Necropolis	Oliver Emanuel	Emerald O'Hanrahan, Rebecca Benson, Lewis Binnie, Alison Peebles, Rosalind Sydney and Liam Brennan	Alice and Sasha are celebrating their graduation when Alice takes Sasha on a secret trip to a graveyard. Sasha is not impressed. But, after they've downed a bottle of bubbly and smoked a joint, they find themselves in the middle of a surreal space where imaginary boys and dead people talk to them and something even more sinister can penetrate their mind...	BBC Radio 4 Afternoon Play
26 January 2016	A History of Paper	Oliver Emanuel	Mark Bonnar and Lucy Gaskell	A man goes through a cardboard box. Each piece of paper he picks out holds a memory. Pieced together, the memories tell the story of an everyday and extraordinary love affair. Folded into that is a brief, and sometimes fictional, history of paper. Shortlisted for Tinniswood Award 2017	BBC Radio 4 Afternoon Play
29 January 2017	Transformations	Oliver Emanuel	Read by Shauna Macdonald	Short story series in which five writers choose five poems as inspiration for new stories. A young woman finds herself transformed into a tree. An entrancing story inspired by Thomas Hardy's poem about life after death.	BBC Radio 4
22 January 2018 – 2 February 2018	The Truth About Hawaii	Oliver Emanuel	Jocelyn Brassington, Christine Bottomley, Roderick Gilkison, Robin Laing, Kevin Mains, Anita Vettesse, Dani Heron and Adura Onashile	Potent and playful drama set in a near-future in which doctors can no longer prescribe antibiotics. Sarah is 10 years old. An everyday scratch turns her family's world upside down. BBC Audio Drama Award winner for Best Original Series or Serial, 2019.	BBC Radio 4 15 Minute Drama
30 September 2018	(After) Fear	Oliver Emanuel	Shauna Macdonald, Meg Fraser, Maryam Hamidi and Robin Laing	A fast-paced, roller-coaster of a thriller about adultery, blackmail, and the heady power of fear. Inspired by the work and life of Stefan and Lotte Zweig.	BBC Radio 3 Drama on 3
11 October 2018	When The Pips Stop	Oliver Emanuel	Shauna Macdonald, Jessica Hardwick, Jakob Jakobsson and Ken Mitchell	It’s 2:13pm on a remote Scottish island where the only inhabitants are two sisters. One of them hasn’t spoken to the other for over two years. They’re listening to The Archers, and then Radio 4 goes off-air. Now they have to learn to live together and without the one thing they each cherish: Radio 4. Tinniswood Award 2019 winner	BBC Radio 4 Afternoon Drama
