= Sally Reid =

Scottish actress

- Born: Perth, Scotland
- Occupation: Actress

Sally Reid is a Scottish stage, radio and television actress.

== Early life ==
Reid was born in Perth, Scotland and was trained at Langside College, Glasgow and with the Steppenwolf Theatre Company and the Second City Training Center in Chicago.

== Filmography ==
=== Theatre ===
Year	Title	Role	Director	Theatre Company	Awards
2002	Rumplestiltskin	Fiona	Simon Sharkey	Cumbernauld	
2002/3	Factory Girls	Rosemary	Guy Hollands	7:84 Theatre Company	
2003	The Nun	Sainte Ursule	Phoebe von Held	Citizen’s Theatre, Glasgow	
2003	Snow White	Snow White	Kenny Miller	Citizens' Theatre, Glasgow	
2004	Top Girls	Kit/Shona/Waitress	Hettie McDonald	Citizens’ Theatre, Glasgow	
2004	The BFG	Katherine	Rita Henderson	The Byre Theatre	
2005	Cleo, Camping, Emmanuelle and Dick	Sally	Kenny Miller	Citizens’ Theatre, Glasgow	
2005	What Ever Happened to Baby Jane?	Baby Jane	Kenny Miller	Citizens’ Theatre, Glasgow	
2005/6	Weans in the Wood	Logan McLean	Gordon Dougall	Tron Theatre	
2006	HOME Dundee	Interviewer	Kenny Miller	National Theatre of Scotland	
2006	The Crucible	Mary Warren	Guy Hollands	TAG Theatre Company/National Theatre of Scotland	
2006	Macbeth	Lady Macduff/Witch	Simon Sharkey	National Theatre of Scotland	
2007	Antigone	Ismene	David Levin	Tron Theatre	
2007	Katie Morag	Katie Morag	Fletcher Mathers	Mull Theatre Company/The Byre Theatre	
2008	The Wall	Norma Gordon	Greg Thompson	Borderline Theatre Company/Tron Theatre	Nomination for the 2008 Critics' Awards for Theatre in Scotland Award for Best Actress
2008	Sunset Song	Marget Strachan	Kenny Ireland	His Majesty’s Theatre, Aberdeen	
2008/9	Beauty and the Beast	Marie Claire	Jemima Levick	Dundee Repertory Theatre	
2009	The Ducky	Norma Gordon	Jemima Levick	Borderline Theatre Company	
2009	Romeo and Juliet	Juliet	Kenny Miller	Oran Mor Theatre	
2009	The Silver Darlings	Una	Kenny Ireland	His Majesty’s Theatre, Aberdeen	
2009	Autobahn	Girl	Kenny Miller	Theatre Jezebel	
2009/10	Ya Beauty and the Beast	Mary Hill	Gordon Dougall	Tron Theatre	
2010	Empty	Bella	Vicky Featherstone	National Theatre of Scotland	
2010	The Miracle Man	Paula	Vicky Featherstone	National Theatre of Scotland	
2010	Doubt	young sister	Mary McCluskey	Tron Theatre	
2010	The Chooky Brae	Norma Gordon	Kenny Miller	Tron Theatre	
2010	Flo White	Flo	Gordon Dougall	Tron Theatre	
2011	Small Town	various	Julie Brown	Random Accomplice/Scottish Tour	
2011	Days of Wine and Roses	Mona	Kenny Miller	Tron Theatre	
2012	Appointment with The Wicker Man	Marie	Vicky Featherstone	National Theatre of Scotland	
2012	The Guid Sisters	Linda Lauzon	Serge Denoncourt	Lyceum Theatre, Edinburgh/National Theatre of Scotland	
2014	Union	Grace	Mark Thomson	Lyceum Theatre, Edinburgh	play by Tim Barrow
2014	Three Sisters	Maddy	Andy Arnold	Tron Theatre, Glasgow	adaptation by John Byrne
2023	Group Portrait in a Summer Landscape	Emma	David Greig	Pitlochry Festival Theatre & Lyceum Theatre, Edinburgh	
2026	Cathy	Lizzie	Eilidh Loan	Traverse Theatre	

=== Radio ===
Date	Title	Role	Director	Station
17 August 2008	Mr Paterson: Diary of a Substitute Teacher	Joni	Iain Davidson	BBC Radio Scotland Comedy Unit
21 August 2008	Sex For Volunteers	Minnie	Kirsty Williams	BBC Radio 4 Afternoon Play
15 May 2009	Jiggedy (Sketch Show)	Various	Iain Davidson	BBC Radio Scotland Comedy Unit
14 October 2009	The Island with No Name	Morag	Kirsteen Cameron	BBC Radio 4 Afternoon Play
14 January 2010 – 4 February 2010	Piano Lessons	Sophie	Owen Bell	BBC Radio Scotland
25 February 2010	Elvis In Prestwick: Don’t Ask Me Why	Reader	Eilidh McCreadie	BBC Radio 4 Afternoon Reading
4 June 2010	Personal Best	Ruth	Kirsty Williams	BBC Radio Scotland
4 January 2011	Scottish Shorts: Fear in a Hat	Reader	Eilidh McCreadie	BBC Radio 4 Afternoon Reading
9 February 2011	Sam’s Story	Samantha	Richard Bull	BBC School Radio
6 September 2011	Occupation	Ashley Gall	Gaynor Macfarlane	BBC Radio 4 Afternoon Play

=== Television ===
Year	Title	Role	Director	Production company
2001	Unorganised Chaos	Waitress	Bryan Larkin	Dabhand Films
2002	In The Dark	Elsie	Patrick Tucker	Works Television
2011	Rab C. Nesbitt	Waitress	Colin Gilbert	The Comedy Unit
2014–	Scot Squad	PC Sarah Fletcher	Iain Davidson	The Comedy Unit
2019-	River City	Claire Baldy		BBC Scotland

Other television credits include The Vampires of Hollywood, Mark Nelson's guide to Marriage, Piano Lessons, Occupation, Personal Best (BBC), and Zombie Role No. 9 (Solus Productions).
