= 2009 British Academy Scotland Awards =

- Date: 8 November 2009
- Site: Glasgow Science Centre, Glasgow, Scotland
- Hosted by: Lorraine Kelly

The 2009 British Academy Scotland Awards were held on 8 November 2009 at the Glasgow Science Centre, honouring the best Scottish film and television productions of 2009. Presented by BAFTA Scotland, accolades are handed out for the best in feature-length film that were screened at British cinemas during 2008. The Nominees were announced on 17 October 2009. The list caused some controversy for the lack of film actresses making the nominations. The ceremony was hosted by Lorraine Kelly.

Bill Forsyth, Jeremy Isaacs, David Jones and Patrick Doyle were honoured with Outstanding Contribution awards at this ceremony.

== Winners and nominees ==
Winners are listed first and highlighted in boldface.

Best Feature Film	Best Director in Film/Television
**Crying With Laughter**: Kurdi; New Town Killers	**Armando Iannucci – In the Loop**: Richard Jobson – New Town Killers; Caroline Paterson & Stuart Davids – Wasted
Best Acting Performance (Film)	Best Short Film
**Peter Capaldi – In the Loop as Malcolm Tucker**: Stephen McCole – Crying With Laughter as Joey Frisk; James Anthony Pearson – New Town Killers as Sean MacDonald	**Life of a Pigeon – Billy Campbell**: The Bedfords – Henry Coombes; Little Red Hooide – Joern Utkilen; Peter in Radioland - Johanna Wagner
Best Actor (Television)	Best Actress (Television)
**Robert Carlyle – The Unloved as Father**: Bill Paterson – Spanish Flu: The Forgotten Fallen as Niven; David Tennant – Doctor Who as The Doctor	**Daniela Nardini – New Town as Meredith McIlvanney**: Lindsay Duncan – Margaret as Margaret Thatcher; Stella Gonet – Holby City as Jayne Grayson
Best Writer Film/Television	Best Entertainment Programme
**Armando Iannucci – In the Loop**: Annie Griffin – New Town; Ed McCardie – Shameless; Justin Molotnikov - Crying With Laughter	**Rab C Nesbitt – (BBC Scotland), (The Comedy Unit)**: Cowards – (BBC Four); No Holds Bard – (BBC Scotland); Shrink Rap - (Channel 4)
Best Factual Series	Best Factual Programme
**Terry Pratchett: Living With Alzheimer's – (BBC Two)**: Girls Behind Bars – (BBC Scotland)	**Sighthill Stories – (BBC)**: Dave Kidney Superstar – (BBC Scotland); In Shackleton's Footsteps – (BBC)
Best Television Drama	Best Interactive
**New Town – (BBC Scotland)**: Eadar-Chluich – (BBC Alba); Eilbheas – (BBC Alba); River City – (BBC Scotland)	**Cybraphon – Found**: British Music Experience – ISO; The Lost Book – Binary Fable
Best Current Affairs	Best Children's Programme
**Panorama: Britain's Homecare Special – (BBC Scotland)**: BBC Scotland Investigates: Scotland's Brand New Bank – (BBC Scotland); Eorpa – (BBC Scotland)	**KNTV - The Act of Sex – (Channel 4)**: Ooglies – (CBBC), (BBC Scotland)
Best Game	Best Animation
**Flock – Proper Games Ltd**: Championship Manager 2010 – Dynamo Games; Low Grav Racer – Cobra Mobile	**The Happy Duckling – Gili Dolev**: Astronaut – Jamie Stone, Anders Jedenfors
Best Web
**Blipfoto.com – Channel 4**: BBC China Stories Website – (BBC Scotland); BBC Robert Burns Website – (BBC Scotland); The Big Plus - Work Skills Academy – (Screen Media)

=== Outstanding Contribution to Film ===
- **Bill Forsyth**

=== Outstanding Contribution to Craft (In Memory of Robert McCann) ===
- **Patrick Doyle**

=== Outstanding Contribution to Broadcasting ===
- **Jeremy Isaacs**

=== Outstanding International Achievement (Digital Media) ===
- **David Jones**

== See also ==
- BAFTA Scotland
- 62nd British Academy Film Awards
- 81st Academy Awards
- 15th Screen Actors Guild Awards
- 29th Golden Raspberry Awards
