= Dangerfield =

Dangerfield is an English surname, originally from a Norman name d'Angerville, after one of several places in northern France called Angerville. Notable people with the surname include:

- Chris Dangerfield, (born 1955), English football player
- Chris Dangerfield, (born 1972), storyteller, comedian, and YouTuber
- Crystal Dangerfield (born 1998), Minnesota Lynx point guard
- Fyfe Dangerfield (born 1980), English songwriter and musician with Guillemots
- Jordan Dangerfield (born 1990), American NFL football player
- Joseph Dangerfield (born 1977), American musician
- George Dangerfield (1904–1986), English-American journalist
- Gordon Dangerfield (born 1885), Australian football player
- Grahame Dangerfield (died 2018), British naturalist
- Patrick Dangerfield (born 1990), Australian football player
- Peter Dangerfield, English anatomist
- Rodney Dangerfield (1921–2004), American comedian
- Stanley Dangerfield (1911-1988), British dog show judge
- Stuart Dangerfield (born 1971), English racing cyclist
- Thomas Dangerfield (1650–1685), English conspirator

== See also ==
- John E. P. Daingerfield, hostage during John Brown's raid on Harpers Ferry
- Dangerfield (TV series), a British television series
- Rover Dangerfield, an animated feature film
- Dangerfield Newby (1815–1859), American former slave who followed John Brown
- Dangerfield Talbert (1878–1914), American baseball player
- Daingerfield, Texas, a town and the namesake of a traditional American fiddle tune
- Dangerfield's, a comedy club in New York City
- The Dangerfields, a band from Northern Ireland
