= Katy Murphy =

Scottish actress and teacher (born 1962)

- Born: 8 December 1962 (age 63); Glasgow, Scotland, United Kingdom
- Occupations: Actress, Teacher
- Years active: 1987–present
- Children: 1

Katy Murphy (born 8 December 1962) is a Scottish actress and teacher from Glasgow, Scotland, who has appeared in many television programs, most of them for the BBC and ITV. While most associated with television drama, she has worked across a variety of genres, including crime and children.

== Early life ==
"Growing up in Glasgow’s east end housing scheme Cranhill, teaching was the plan," and Murphy studied at Glasgow University before discovering a love for the stage. Her birth name is Margaret.

== Career ==
Murphy rose to prominence after appearing as Janice Toner in Tutti Frutti (1987), starring Robbie Coltrane. It was written by John Byrne for BBC Scotland, and won six BAFTAs, bringing "many of the cast to national prominence." She also appeared in Byrne's next series, Your Cheatin' Heart (1990), starring Tilda Swinton.

Other credits include Takin' Over the Asylum, written by Donna Franceschild, A Mug's Game (1996), Mike and Angelo, Spatz, B&B, The Steamie, The River, Casualty, and Agatha Christie's Poirot. She played the part of Jenny Wren in the BBC Two adaptation of Charles Dickens' Our Mutual Friend.

Among her later work is the distraught mother of a murdered girl in Prime Suspect (2006), and the 2008 drama series Honest. In 2018, Murphy again teamed up with Donna Franceschild to star in her short film Bridge, with Steven Duffy. Her radio work includes the role of Janet in the Radio 4 series Adventures of a Black Bag.

Katy Murphy works part time as a teacher, with young children, including those with special needs, saying she loves it because "[it’s] so healthy. You’re looking outwards, rather than inwards." When teaching, she uses the name Margaret, which is on her birth certificate.

== Personal life ==
Murphy lives in North London's Crouch End, where she has owned a home since 1998, the year her daughter, Lola, was born.

== Theatre ==
Year	Title	Role	Company	Director	Notes
1989	The Cherry Orchard	Dunyasha	Lyceum Theatre Company, Edinburgh	Hugh Hodgart	play by Anton Chekov, adapted by Stuart Paterson

== Filmography ==
Film
Year	Title	Role	Notes
1995	Butterfly Kiss	Judith	
2004	Dear Frankie	Miss MacKenzie	
2008	The Cottage	Farmer's Wife	
2008	Miss Pettigrew Lives for a Day	Miss Holt's Assistant	
2010	Cemetery Junction	Mrs Waring	
2018	Bridge	Woman	Short

Television
Year	Title	Role	Notes
1987	Tutti Frutti	Janice Toner	Series 1 — 6 episodes
1988	The Play on One	Ishbel	Series 1, Episode 3: "Normal Service"
1988	Arena	Usherette	Series 13, Episode 17: "Byrne About Byrne"
1988	The River	Sarah MacDonald	Series 1 — 6 episodes
1988	The Steamie	Doreen	Television film
1989	Poirot	Annie	Series 1, Episode 1: "The Adventure of the Clapham Cook"
1990	Oranges Are Not the Only Fruit	Mrs. Virtue	Miniseries — 3 episodes
1990	Your Cheatin' Heart	Billie McPhail	Miniseries – 6 episodes
1991–1992	Spatz	Fiona 'Freddy' Reddy	Series 2–3 — 20 episodes
1991	4 Play	Maddie	Series 2, Episode 2: "'Itch"
1991	Casualty	Kath	Series 6, Episode 9: "Making the Break"
1992	She-Play	Bunty	Episode: "Full Board"
1992	B & B	Billie Golden	Television film
1993	The Bill	Jane Campbell	Series 9, Episode 1: "Dying Breed"
1993	The Brown Man	Hilary Preminger	Television film
1994	Roughnecks	Check-In Girl	Series 1, Episode 1
1994	Takin' Over the Asylum	Francine	Miniseries – 6 episodes
1994	Between the Lines	Linda Watson	Series 3, Episode 3: "A Face in the Crowd"
1995–2000	Mike and Angelo	Katy Andrews	Series 7–12 — 60 episodes
1995	Dangerfield	Terri Morgan	Series 2 — 11 episodes
1995	Roughnecks	Cath	Series 2 — 7 episodes
1996	A Mug's Game	Denise	
1997	Rab C. Nesbitt	D.S.S. Assistant	Series 6, Episode 1: "Fast"
1998	Our Mutual Friend	Jenny Wren	Miniseries — 3 episodes
1998	Two Lives	Mary	Episode: "Rose"
2000	Nature Boy	Steve's Nurse	Miniseries — 1 episode
2000	Fish	Angela Duncan	Series 1 — 6 episodes
2000	Donovan Quick	Lucy Pannick	Television film
2001	Happiness	Moira	Series 1, Episode 6: "Forty"
2001	Holby City	Laura Sullivan	Series 3, Episode 27: "The Mourning After'
2002	The Bill	Lorna Buchanan	Series 18, Episode 35: "Sitting Tenants"
2002	Me & Mrs Jones	Michelle	Television film
2003	Midsomer Murders	Helen	Series 6, Episode 4: "A Tale of Two Hamlets"
2003	The Key	Katherine	Miniseries — 3 episodes
2003	Doctors	Mrs. Cox	Series 5, Episode 154: "End of Innocence"
2006	The Kindness of Strangers	Dr. Sarah	Television film
2006	Prime Suspect	Ruth Sturdy	Series 7: "The Final Act" (Parts 1 & 2)
2008	Honest	Caitlin	Series 1, Episode 2
2009	No Holds Bard	Sheila Buchanan	Television film
2009	Holby City	Denise Foreman	Series 11, Episode 48: "Out of the Woods"
2011	Zen	Sister Anna	Series 1, Episode 3: "Ratking"
2011	The Suspicions of Mr Whicher	Mrs. Holley	Television film: "The Murder at Road Hill House"
2021	Kangaroo Beach	Shelley	Series 1, Episode 26: "Cadets in Charge"
