= Robin Laing =

Scottish actor (born 1976)

Robin Laing (born 1976) is a Scottish actor, best known for his portrayal of Edward Heffron in the HBO series Band of Brothers (2001) and as DI Craig Donald in River City (2012–17).

== Early life and education ==
Born in Dundee, Laing began acting at a young age, joining an Arbroath theatre company, the Angus Children's Theatre and then later the Carnoustie Theatre Club. While at school he landed his first professional role at Dundee Repertory Theatre, playing Young Steerforth in David Copperfield. After leaving school he studied Drama in Dundee and at Fife College.

== Career ==
His first professional, adult role was playing Renton in the UK tour of Trainspotting in 1996. While on tour he was asked to cover the role in London's West End for four shows, during which time John Byrne saw him and asked Laing to screen-test for his upcoming film The Slab Boys. He was cast in the role of Phil McCann, and filming took place later that year in Glasgow.

Laing's participation in Band of Brothers led to a friendship with Heffron, lasting until Heffron's passing in 2013. Laing played Martin Ness in 2004's "Shadowplay", part of Series 4 (episodes 11 and 12) of Waking the Dead.

He joined the cast of River City in 2012 as DCI Craig Donald, and would appear regularly on it until 2017, and also appeared on Waterloo Road in a recurring role. He also appears as Major Donald MacDonald in seasons six and seven of Outlander. Other appearances include in the films Filth (2013) and Outlaw King (2018).

== Personal life ==
Laing resides in London.

== Filmography ==
=== Film ===
Year	Title	Role	Notes
2000	Borstal Boy	Jock	
2000	Beautiful Creatures	Garage Attendant	
2005	Joyeux Noël	William	
2013	Filth	Rent Boy	
2018	Outlaw King	Bishop of St Andrews	
2018	Only You	Private Doctor	

=== Television ===
Year	Title	Role	Notes
1997-1999	The Lakes	Joey	Main role, 14 episodes
1998	Cadfael	Sulien Blount	2 episodes
1998; 2008	Taggart	Mark Jackson/Sgt. Sean Mackay	2 episodes
2000	Murder Rooms: Mysteries of the Real Sherlock Holmes	Arthur Conan Doyle	Miniseries, 1 episode
2001	Band of Brothers	Pfc. Edward Heffron	Miniseries, 8 episodes
2004	Waking the Dead	Martin Ness	1 episode
2005	Born and Bred	Albert Tooley	1 episode
2006	Murder City	Nathan Wallis	1 episode
2010	Garrow's Law	Westminster Clerk	1 episode
2012-2017; 2022-2023	River City	DI Craig Donald	Main role, 66 episodes
2015	Waterloo Road	Ronnie Fairchild	Recurring role, 5 episodes
2016	One of Us	Constable Hartley	Miniseries, 1 episode
2016	The Coroner	Eddie Landman	1 episode
2017	Casualty	Robert Kearns	1 episode
2019	Shetland	Gavin Laird	Recurring role, 5 episodes
2019	The Victim	Andy Tait	Miniseries, 3 episodes
2021	Vigil	Miller	1 episode
2021	Guilt	Adrian	2 episodes
2022	Outlander	Donald MacDonald	Recurring role, 6 episodes
2023	Stonehouse	Bank Manager	Miniseries, 1 episode
2023	The Gold	Garth Chappell	4 episodes
2024–2026	Only Child	Ian	7 episodes
2025	Lockerbie: A Search for Truth	Roland Stephenson	2 episodes
2026	Silo	Phil	1 episode

=== Radio ===
Date	Title	Role	Director	Station
21 August 2008	Sex for Volunteers	Douglas	Kirsty Williams	BBC Radio 4 Afternoon Play
9 October 2009	Daniel and Mary	Daniel	Kirsty Williams	BBC Radio Scotland Drama
26 January 2010	The Ca'd'oro Cafe	Billy	Kirsty Williams	BBC Radio 4 Afternoon Play
28 February 2010	La Princesse de Clèves	Nemours	Kirsty Williams	BBC Radio 3 Drama on 3
30 October 2010	The Vanishing	Jean-Pierre Gallo; Manager	Kirsty Williams	BBC Radio 4 Saturday Play
28 September 2011	One Hundred and Forty Characters: Songbirds	Read by	Kirsteen Cameron	BBC Radio 4 Afternoon Reading
19 December 2011	Down and Out in Auchangaish	Donnie	Kirsty Williams	BBC Radio 4 Afternoon Play
13 August 2012 – 17 August 2012	The Other One	Dad	Kirsty Williams	BBC Radio 4 Woman's Hour Drama
23 September 2012	Mary Stuart	Leicester	Gaynor Macfarlane	BBC Radio 3 Drama on 3
29 January 2014	Albion Street	Jamie	Gaynor Macfarlane	BBC Radio Scotland Drama
22 January 2018 – 2 February 2018	The Truth About Hawaii	David	Kirsty Williams	BBC Radio 4 15 Minute Drama
22 January 2018 – 12 February 2018	4/4	Archie	Gaynor Macfarlane	BBC Radio 4 Afternoon Drama
30 September 2018	(After) Fear	The Pianist	Kirsty Williams	BBC Radio 3 Drama on 3
