= Oliver Emanuel =

British playwright and radio dramatist (1980–2023)

- Born: Oliver Robert Michael Emanuel; 4 April 1980; Kent, England
- Died: 19 December 2023 (aged 43)
- Education: University of Leeds (BA); University of East Anglia (MA)
- Occupations: Playwright; radio writer
- Spouse: Victoria Beesley (m. 2023)
- Children: 2

Oliver Robert Michael Emanuel (4 April 1980 – 19 December 2023) was a British playwright and radio dramatist.

== Early life and education ==
Oliver Robert Michael Emanuel was born in Kent on 4 April 1980; his mother was a drama teacher and his father was a solicitor. He attended St Gregory's Catholic Comprehensive School in Tunbridge Wells, studied English and Theatre Studies at University of Leeds, and received an MA from the University of East Anglia.

== Career ==
Emanuel was Writer-on-Attachment at the West Yorkshire Playhouse in 2006 and Writer-in-Residence for BBC Radio 4 Children in Need in 2010. He lived in Glasgow from 2006. He was Reader of Playwriting at the University of St Andrews, an Associate Playwright at Playwrights' Studio Scotland, and Writer-in-Residence at Gladstone's Library.

In addition to his radio and stage plays below, Emanuel wrote two plays for Polmont Young Offenders Institute, Ship of Shadows (October 2009) and John (7 May 2010), and scripted the short film This Way Up.

== Personal life and death ==
In April 2023, Emanuel was diagnosed with brain cancer, and died from the disease on 19 December 2023, at the age of 43. Emanuel had two children with Victoria Beesley; he and Beesley married in late 2023, shortly before his death.

== Works ==
=== Radio plays ===
Radio plays written by Oliver Emanuel
Date first broadcast	Play	Director	Cast	Awards	Station Series
11 April 2007	Joseph and Joseph	Colin Guthrie	Shaun Dooley, Helen Longworth, Christine Kavanagh, Sam Dale, John Dougall, Philippe Smolikowski, Mark Straker and Rachel Bavidge		BBC Radio 4 Afternoon Play
9 October 2009	Daniel and Mary	Kirsty Williams	Robin Laing and Natasha Watson	Bronze Sony Award for Best Drama 2010	BBC Radio Scotland; Drama
23 February 2010	Elvis in Prestwick	Eilidh McCreadie	Read by Laura Fraser		BBC Radio 4 Afternoon Reading
30 October 2010	The Vanishing dramatisation of Tim Krabbé novel	Kirsty Williams	Samuel West, Melody Grove, Ruth Gemmell, Liam Brennan, Natasha Watson, Claire Knight and Robin Laing		BBC Radio 4 Saturday Play
17 November 2010	Everything	Lu Kemp	Natasha Watson, Sandy Grierson and Meg Fraser		BBC Radio 4 Afternoon Play
12 February 2011	One Night in Iran	Lu Kemp	Khalid Abdalla and Maryam Hamidi		BBC Radio 3 The Wire
28 September 2011	One Hundred and Forty Characters: Songbirds	Kirsteen Cameron	Read by Robin Laing		BBC Radio 4 Afternoon Reading
30 November 2011	Ancient Greek	Lu Kemp	Alex Austin, Vincent Ebrahim, Sophie Stanton, Caitlin FitzGerald and Austin Moulton		BBC Radio 4 Afternoon Play
30 June 2012	Thirteen Minutes in Cairo	Kirsty Williams	Meg Fraser, Simon Tait and Hannah Donaldson		BBC Radio 4 From Fact to Fiction
13 August 2012 – 17 August 2012	The Other One	Kirsty Williams	Natasha Watson, Frances Grey, Robin Laing, Meg Fraser and Finlay Welsh		BBC Radio 4 Woman's Hour Drama
22 February 2013	The Spare Room	Lu Kemp	Candida Benson, Babou Ceesay, Hannah Wood and Michael Shelford		BBC Radio 4
29 January 2014	Albion Street	Gaynor Macfarlane	Robin Laing and Meg Fraser		BBC Radio Scotland; Drama
16 January 2015	Take Me to the Necropolis	Kirsty Williams	Emerald O'Hanrahan, Rebecca Benson, Lewis Binnie, Alison Peebles, Rosalind Sydney and Liam Brennan		BBC Radio 4 Afternoon Play
23 November 2015	Blood Sex and Money by Emile Zola: 1.3. Food dramatised by Oliver Emanuel	Kirsty Williams	Glenda Jackson, Jodie McNee, James Anthony Pearson, Jonathan Keeble, Graeme Hawley, Millie Kinsey and Julie Hesmondhalgh		BBC Radio 4 Afternoon Play
24 November 2015	Blood Sex and Money by Emile Zola: 1.4. Politics dramatised by Oliver Emanuel	Kirsty Williams	Glenda Jackson, Robert Jack, Laura Dos Santos, Jodie McNee, James Anthony Pearson, Graeme Hawley and Jonathan Keeble		BBC Radio 4 Afternoon Play
25 November 2015	Blood Sex and Money by Emile Zola: 1.5. Drink dramatised by Oliver Emanuel	Kirsty Williams	Glenda Jackson, Julie Hesmondhalgh and Mark Holgate		BBC Radio 4 Afternoon Play
26 January 2016	A History of Paper	Kirsty Williams	Mark Bonnar and Lucy Gaskell	Shortlisted for Tinniswood Award 2017	BBC Radio 4 Afternoon Play
7 May 2016	Blood Sex and Money by Emile Zola: 2.1. Performance dramatised by Oliver Emanuel	Kirsty Williams	Glenda Jackson, Holliday Grainger, Ben Batt, John Catterall, David Crellin, Kimberly Hart-Simpson, Reece Noi and Kate O'Flynn		BBC Radio 4 Saturday Play
8 May 2016	Blood Sex and Money by Emile Zola: 2.2. Power dramatised by Oliver Emanuel	Kirsty Williams	Glenda Jackson, Robert Jack, Victoria Beesley, Laurie Brown, Laura Dos Santos, Alasdair Hankinson and Jonathan Keeble		BBC Radio 4
28 October 2016	Blood Sex and Money by Emile Zola: 3.7. Fate dramatised by Oliver Emanuel	Kirsty Williams	Glenda Jackson, Robert Jack, Samuel West, John Bett, Colette O'Neil, Gavi Singh Chera and Sean Graham	BBC Audio Drama Award for Best Adaptation, 2017.	BBC Radio 4 Afternoon Play
29 January 2017	Transformations	Kirsty Williams	Read by Shauna Macdonald		BBC Radio 4
22 January 2018 – 2 February 2018	The Truth About Hawaii	Kirsty Williams	Jocelyn Brassington, Christine Bottomley, Roderick Gilkison, Robin Laing, Kevin Mains, Anita Vettesse, Dani Heron and Adura Onashile	BBC Audio Drama Award winner for Best Original Series or Serial, 2019. ISNTD (International Society for Neglected Tropical Diseases) Festival, Best Audio Drama, 2018.	BBC Radio 4; 15 Minute Drama
30 September 2018	(After) Fear	Kirsty Williams	Shauna Macdonald, Meg Fraser, Maryam Hamidi and Robin Laing		BBC Radio 3 Drama on 3
11 October 2018	When The Pips Stop	Kirsty Williams	Shauna Macdonald, Jessica Hardwick, Jakob Jakobsson and Ken Mitchell	Tinniswood Award 2019 winner	BBC Radio 4 Afternoon Drama

=== Theatre ===
Stage plays written by Oliver Emanuel
Date	Title	Director	Cast	Theatre Company	Notes
August 2001 – 18 August 2001	Gemini		Victoria Glass and Claire Davies	Stage By Stage	
3 August 2003 – 25 August 2003	Iz	Daniel Bye	Grae Cleugh and Nick Jesper	Silver Tongue Theatre / Pleasance Theatre	
June 2004 –	Iz	Daniel Bye	Grae Cleugh and James Gitsham	Silver Tongue Theatre / Tron Theatre, Glasgow	
August 2006 – 28 August 2006	Shiver	Daniel Bye	Kay Bridgeman and Grae Cleugh	Silver Tongue Theatre / Pleasance Courtyard	
28 May 2007 – 7 June 2007	Shiver	Daniel Bye	Marcia Battise	Theatre 503	
6 August 2005 – 28 August 2005	Bella and the Beautiful Knight	Daniel Bye	Grae Cleugh, Sally Kent, Nicholas Cowell	Silver Tongue Theatre / Gilded Balloon Teviot	
May 2006 –	Bella and the Beautiful Knight	Daniel Bye	Grae Cleugh, Sally Kent, Nicholas Cowell	Tron Theatre, Glasgow	
19 May 2007 – 8 June 2007	Magpie Park	Sam Brown	Alison Pargeter and Liam McKenna	West Yorkshire Playhouse, Leeds	
August 2007 – 26 August 2007	Man Across the Way	Daniel Bye	Grae Cleugh, Nicholas Cowell, John Milroy and Harriette Quarrie	Silver Tongue Theatre and Theatre 503	
April 2008 – 11 April 2008	The Severed Head of Comrade Bukhari	Daljinder Singh	Arches Theatre, Glasgow		
16 April 2008 – 19 April 2008	The Severed Head of Comrade Bukhari	Daljinder Singh	Traverse Theatre, Edinburgh		
June 2008 –	Flit	Alison Peebles		National Theatre of Scotland	
13 October 2008 –	Videotape	Joe Douglas	Robbie Jack and Sam Young	Òran Mór, Glasgow	
March 2011 –	One night in Iran		Nabil Stuart and Amiera Darwish	Òran Mór, Glasgow	
21 June 2011	Henry & Ingrid: Some Words For Home			Tron Theatre, Glasgow	
2011 –	Spirit of Adventure			Dundee Rep / Òran Mór, Glasgow	
2012 –	Random Objects Flying Through The Air			Royal Conservatoire of Scotland / Playwrights' Studio, Scotland	
2012 –	End of The World			Red Note Ensemble	
2012 – 2013	Titus			Macrobert / Playwrights' Studio, Scotland / Imaginate / Edinburgh Festival Fringe	New English version of Jan Sobrie's text.
2013 –	The Day I Swapped My Dad for Two Goldfish	Lu Kemp		National Theatre of Scotland	Adaptation of the book by Neil Gaiman and Dave McKean (created by Lu Kemp and Abigail Docherty)
2013 – 2015	Dragon			Vox Motus / National Theatre of Scotland / Tianjin People's Arts Theatre, China	Conceived by Jamie Harrison, Oliver Emanuel and Candice Edmunds
4 December 2014 – 4 January 2015	The Little Boy That Santa Claus Forgot	Gareth Nicholls	David Ireland and Alasdair Hankinson	Macrobert; The Arches, Glasgow	Co-created with Gareth Nicholls
2014 –	The Adventures of Robin Hood			Visible Fictions	
13 May 2015 –	The Lost Things	Ross MacKay	Arran Howie and Alex Bird	Tortoise in a Nutshell	
21 March 2016 – 26 March 2016	Prom	Gareth Nicholls	Ryan Fletcher, Helen MacKay, Martin McBride and Nicola Roy	A Play, a Pie and a Pint; Òran Mór, Glasgow	
29 March 2016 – 6 April 2016	Prom	Gareth Nicholls	Ryan Fletcher, Helen MacKay, Martin McBride and Nicola Roy	Traverse Theatre, Edinburgh	
24 May 2016 – 11 June 2016	The 306: Dawn	Laurie Sansom	Scott Gilmour, Josef Davies and Joshua Miles	National Theatre of Scotland, Perth Theatre with funding from 14–18 NOW	Composed by Gareth Williams
5 May 2017 – 3 June 2017	The 306: Day	Jemima Levick	Dani Heron, Amanda Wilkin, Fletcher Mathers, Wendy Somerville, Angela Hardie and Steven Miller	National Theatre of Scotland, Perth Theatre and Stellar Quines Theatre Company with funding from 14–18 NOW	Composed by Gareth Williams
4 August 2017 – 27 August 2017	Flight	Jamie Harrison and Candice Edmunds	Nalini Chetty, Farshid Rokey, Emun Elliott, Maryam Hamidi, Robert Jack, Rosalind Sydney, Waleed Akhtar and Adura Odashile Herald Angel Award 2017.	Vox Motus; Church Hill Theatre, Edinburgh	Based on the novel Hinterland by Caroline Brothers
29 January 2018 – 30 September 2018	Flight	Jamie Harrison and Candice Edmunds	Nalini Chetty, Farshid Rokey, Emun Elliott, Maryam Hamidi, Robert Jack, Rosalind Sydney, Waleed Akhtar and Adura Odashile Herald Angel Award 2017.	McKittrick Hotel, New York	Based on the novel Hinterland by Caroline Brothers
5 October 2018 – 21 October 2018	Flight	Jamie Harrison and Candice Edmunds	Nalini Chetty, Farshid Rokey, Emun Elliott, Maryam Hamidi, Robert Jack, Rosalind Sydney, Waleed Akhtar and Adura Odashile Herald Angel Award 2017.	Melbourne International Arts Festival	Based on the novel Hinterland by Caroline Brothers
4 May 2019 – 23 May 2019	Flight	Jamie Harrison and Candice Edmunds	Nalini Chetty, Farshid Rokey, Emun Elliott, Maryam Hamidi, Robert Jack, Rosalind Sydney, Waleed Akhtar and Adura Odashile Herald Angel Award 2017.	Brighton Festival	Based on the novel Hinterland by Caroline Brothers
18 January 2020 – 2 February 2020	Flight	Jamie Harrison and Candice Edmunds	Nalini Chetty, Farshid Rokey, Emun Elliott, Maryam Hamidi, Robert Jack, Rosalind Sydney, Waleed Akhtar and Adura Odashile Herald Angel Award 2017.	ASU Gammage	Based on the novel Hinterland by Caroline Brothers
10 October 2018 – 27 October 2018	The 306: Dusk	Wils Wilson	Sarah Kameela Impey, Ryan Fletcher and Danny Hughes	National Theatre of Scotland, Perth Theatre with funding from 14–18 NOW	Composed by Gareth Williams
3 October 2019 – 19 October 2019	The Monstrous Heart	Gareth Nicholls	Charlene Boyd, Christine Entwisle and Tanya Moodie	Stephen Joseph Theatre, Scarborough	
22 October 2019 – 2 November 2019	The Monstrous Heart	Gareth Nicholls	Charlene Boyd, Christine Entwisle and Tanya Moodie	Traverse Theatre, Edinburgh	

=== Short stories ===
- Nude

=== Other work ===
- Desperate Run

== Awards ==
- Daniel and Mary received a Bronze Sony Radio Academy Award for Best Drama in 2010.
- Dragon won Best Show For Children and Young People at the UK Theatre Awards in 2014.
- His version of Titus won the People's Choice Victor Award in 2015.
- A History of Paper was shortlisted for the Tinniswood Award 2017.
- When The Pips Stop won the Tinniswood Award in 2019.
- The Truth About Hawaii won the BBC Audio Drama Award for Best Original Series or Serial in 2019.
