= Joe Douglas =

British theatre director, playwright, and performer (born 1983)

Joe Douglas (born 1983) is a British theatre director, playwright and performer. He was the Artistic Director of Live Theatre in Newcastle from 2018 to 2020.

== Background ==
Douglas was born and raised in Manchester, where he attended St. Bede's College. He studied directing at Rose Bruford College in London before winning a place on the ITV Theatre Director Scheme to train with the National Theatre of Scotland.

== Career ==
As a freelance director Douglas has directed at the Dundee Repertory Theatre, Oran Mor and the Traverse Theatre among others. He has worked for the National Theatre of Scotland, HighTide and National Youth Music Theatre.

In 2012 he was awarded an Edinburgh Fringe First Award for Educating Ronnie, a one-man show based on his experiences in Uganda which he both wrote and performed. He directed two shows at the Edinburgh festival in 2014 including a play by Chimamanda Ngozi Adichie.

His revivals of The Cheviot, the Stag, and the Black Black Oil and Death of a Salesman were both critical and commercial successes, winning several CATS.

His first directorial production for Live Theatre was Clear White Light.

== Theatre credits ==
- Clear White Light (2018), for Live Theatre
- Arabian Nights (2017), for the Royal Lyceum Theatre
- Death of a Salesman (2016), by Arthur Miller for Dundee Repertory Theatre
- The Cheviot, the Stag and the Black, Black Oil (2014) by John McGrath for the Dundee Repertory Theatre
- Dear Scotland (2014), co-directed with Catrin Evans for the National Theatre of Scotland
- Bloody Trams (2014) by Joe Douglas at the Traverse Theatre
- The Call of the Wild (2014) by Jack London at Oran Mor
- The BFG (2013) by Roald Dahl at the Dundee Repertory Theatre
- The Reprobates (2013) by Phil Porter
- Thank You (2013) by Catrin Evans at Oran Mor
- The Last Polar Bears (2011) by Harry Horse for the National Theatre of Scotland
- Our Teacher's A Troll (2010) by Dennis Kelly for the National Theatre of Scotland
- Videotape (2009) by Oliver Emmanuel at Oran Mor
