= Gareth Williams (composer) =

Irish musical artist (born 1977)

- Born: Gareth Williams
- Origin: County Armagh, Northern Ireland
- Occupation: Composer
- Years active: 2000–
- Website: http://www.garethwilliamsmusic.com/

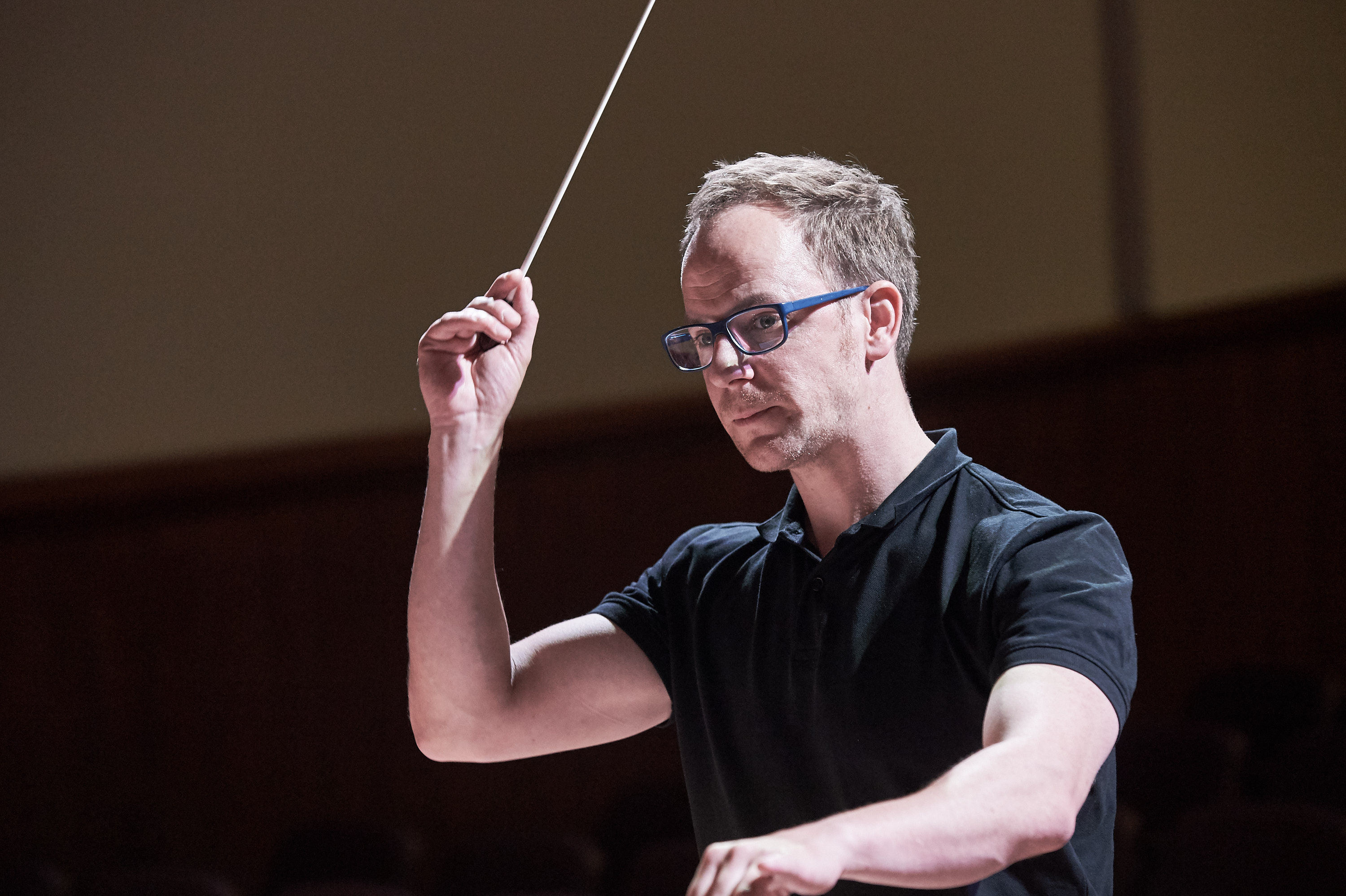

Gareth Patrick Williams (born 1977) is an Irish composer based at Edinburgh College of Art. He was the first composer in residence for Scottish Opera from 2012 to 2015. His work spans from opera and music theatre to chamber music.

== Career ==
Originally from Armagh, Williams moved to Glasgow after studying music at Queen's University, Belfast. In 2008 he was awarded his doctorate from the University of St Andrews. He taught composition at the Royal Conservatoire of Scotland until 2012, and since then he has worked as a freelance composer. His work has been featured in the Edinburgh Festival, St Magnus Festival, Tête à Tête (opera company), Opera to Go, and the York Late Music Festival. His music has been broadcast on BBC Scotland, BBC Radio Scotland, BBC Radio Ulster, RTÉ Television, BBC Radio 3, BBC Radio 4, and CBC Radio 2 in Canada.

In 2009, he was on residency at the Centre Culturel Irlandais in Paris, where he wrote two large music theatre pieces -A Short Treatise on Love and Miracle for the Sound Festival in Aberdeen, and Gethsemane for the 2010 Plug Festival. In August 2009 and 2010, he took part in the LibLab at Tapestry New Opera Works in Toronto, to create short operas in collaboration with Canadian writers, and these were performed in the Opera Briefs festival in Toronto in both years. In Scotland, NOISE (New Opera in Scotland Events) commissioned and premiered ‘the Sloans Project’ (with libretto by David James Brock).

Williams has been Composer in Residence at Scottish Opera, where he created several works for the company. Elephant Angel (with libretto by Bernard McLaverty) toured Scotland and Northern Ireland in Autumn 2012. Another opera, Last One Out (with libretto by Johnny McKnight), premiered at the Sound Festival in 2012 in Fraserburgh Lighthouse. Both works received five star reviews from The Herald (Glasgow) and The Scotsman. Hand (with libretto by Johnny McKnight) was created for the 2013 Opera Highlights tour. The Song, the Stars and the Blossom (text from an interview with Dennis Potter) appeared in 2014 and Rocking Horse Winner by D. H. Lawrence (Librettist Anna Chatterton) in 2015. Rocking Horse Winner, chamber opera with libretto by Anna Chatterton, was premiered by Tapestry Opera in Toronto in 2016, and was shortlisted for nine Dora Mavor Moore Awards in 2017, winning five, including best operatic production. The piece was re-staged at Saratoga Opera Festival in 2018, at Opera Louisiane, Baton Rouge, in 2023, at Opera Maine in 2023, and again by Tapestry Opera in Toronto in 2023. In 2020, Tapestry Opera recorded and released the opera.

With the support of The Wellcome Trust, he created Breath Cycle (with libretto by David James Brock) at the Respiratory ward at Gartnavel Royal Hospital, where he made songs and opera specifically for patients with cystic fibrosis. The material was bespoke to lung capacity, range, and ability, and the effects of singing on respiratory health are being monitored and measured. Breath Cycle was shortlisted for a Royal Philharmonic Society Award in 2013. He returned to Scottish Opera in 2021 to create Breath Cycle II, working with people with Long Covid. Together they created A Covid Songbook - a collaborative, ongoing collection of songs written for/with people living with Long Covid. In 2015, Hirda, A New Opera for Shetland, co-composed with Shetland Fiddler, Chris Stout, and produced by NOISE, toured Shetland and performed in Glasgow and Edinburgh

From 2016 to 2018, with writer Oliver Emanuel, Williams created the 306 Trilogy, a set of three music theatre works about the British men shot for cowardice in World War 1, commissioned and produced by National Theatre of Scotland, 14 - 18 Now, Horsecross Theatre, Stellar Quines, Red Note Ensemble. Part 1, 306 Dawn, and part 2, 306 Day were shortlisted for CATS awards for best music and sound. A compilation of the songs from the 306 Trilogy was recorded and released in 2021, called "Lost Light, Music from the 306."

In 2018, Navigate the Blood, an opera, co composed with indie band Admiral Fallow, was commissioned and produced by NOISE Opera. A site specific work, it toured whisky distilleries of Scotland.

In 2022, Scottish Opera premiered Rubble, a chamber opera written to include their young company, written by Gareth Williams and Johnny McKnight, that explores stories of violence and abuse in a fictitious Glasgow children's carehome in the 1980s, The libretto was written in contemporary Glasgow dialect.

In 2022, as part of Event Scotland's Year of Stories Williams created 'Songs from the Last Page' - a singing/songwriting project that transformed/repurposed the final lines of classic and contemporary Scottish novels into new songs written for the composer's own voice. This project toured Book Festivals and libraries of Scotland in 2022, and was part of the Made in Scotland Showcase at Edinburgh Fringe Festival in 2023. 11 of the songs were released as an album, Songs from the Last Page, in 2023, and featured a Gaelic song by singer, Dierdre Graham.

== Prizes and awards ==
Prizes include the Dinah Wolf Prize for Composition, and his piece Search Engines was winner of the 2000 Great British Conservatoire Composers Forum. His opera 'Rocking Horse Winner' was nominated for nine Dora Mavor Moore Awards in 2017, winning in five categories, including best opera production, best ensemble and best director.

== Selected works ==
- The Elephant Angel Scottish Opera, 2012
- Last One Out Scottish Opera, 2012
- The Sloans Project with writer David James Brock, Noise Opera 2011
- Worry Doll The Sutherland Duo 2011
- White Scottish Opera 2010
- The King's Conjecture Scottish Opera, 2008
- Naviagate the Blood co-composed with Admiral Fallow NOISE Opera 2018
- Hirda co-composed with Chris Stout NOISE Opera 2015
- The 306 Trilogy with writer Oliver Emanuel National Theatre of Scotland 2016 - 2018
- A Million Billion Pieces with writer David James Brock Young People's Theatre, Toronto 2019
