= Angerville =

Angerville is a northern French toponym, originally from a Norse personal name Asgeir plus the designation ville for "farm, village". It may refer to these places in France:

- Angerville, Calvados, in the Calvados département
- Angerville, Essonne, in the Essonne département
- Angerville-Bailleul, in the Seine-Maritime département
- Angerville-la-Campagne, in the Eure département
- Angerville-la-Martel, in the Seine-Maritime département
- Angerville-l'Orcher, in the Seine-Maritime département

== See also ==
- Dangerfield
