= Your Cheatin' Heart (TV series) =

1990 BBC Scotland comedy TV show

- Genre: Comedy drama
- Written by: John Byrne
- Directed by: Michael Whyte
- Starring: Tilda Swinton; John Gordon-Sinclair
- Country of origin: United Kingdom
- Original language: English
- No. of episodes: 6

Production
- Producer: Peter Broughan
- Running time: 50 mins
- Production company: BBC Scotland

Original release
- Release: 11 October – 15 November 1990

Your Cheatin' Heart is a BBC Scotland six-part comedy drama serial, broadcast in 1990 and written by John Byrne. It starred Tilda Swinton, John Gordon-Sinclair, Katy Murphy, Eddi Reader and Ken Stott. The format is similar to Byrne's earlier serial Tutti Frutti, but the tone is much darker.

== Plot ==
Cissie Crouch (Tilda Swinton) is working as a waitress in an American-themed bar and restaurant in Glasgow called "Bar L", while her husband Dorwood Crouch (Kevin McMonagle) is in prison for a robbery she believes he did not commit. (The prison where Crouch is being held is a thinly disguised version of Barlinnie Prison, known locally as "The Bar L"). She meets journalist Frank McClusky (John Gordon-Sinclair) who agrees to help her to clear her husband's name by investigating Fraser Boyle (Ken Stott), a violent small-time criminal and drug dealer who had been a member of Dorwood's band "Dorwood Crouch and The Deadwood Playboys". McClusky discovers a connection between Boyle and Irish band "Jim Bob O'May (Guy Mitchell) and The Wild Bunch". Boyle is the father of Cissie's child, who has been taken into care due to Cissie's inability to meet the child's needs and is living with foster parents in Aberdeen.

McClusky uses a taxi operated by Billie McPhail (Katy Murphy) and Jolene Jowett (Eddi Reader), who also perform as Country and Western duo "The McPhail Sisters", and are looking for additional support musicians for what they see as their big chance as support act for the Wild Bunch. McCluskey pretends to be a musician and persuades Cissie to join him in supporting them in order to infiltrate the Country and Western scene in Glasgow.

David Cole (Guy Gregory), the owner and manager of the Bar L, has been engaging in large scale international drug dealing, and is murdered by the gang of rival Ralph Henderson (Jack Fortune) over possession of a package of 18 pounds of cocaine which they believe to be concealed in the Bar-L, but are unable to find. Henderson plans to use The Wild Bunch to transport the drugs.

Dorwood climbs onto the prison roof to protest his innocence but falls off and then escapes from hospital, still seriously injured, with the help of Boyle who plans, incompetently, to smuggle him out of the country with the Wild Bunch.

All the characters converge on the venue of the Wild Bunch concert at the "Ponderosa", a roadhouse bar outside Glasgow. Tamara MacAskill (Helen Atkinson-Wood), a local radio reporter who has been following the Dorwood Crouch escape and the David Cole murder, appears for a routine interview with O'May and recognises Henderson, who incorrectly assumes that she is investigating the drugs deal and abducts her while he goes to pick up the drugs shipment which has now been found by one of his associates.

Dorwood has been left in the car park while the others go into the bar to perform, where he shoots and wounds one of Boyle's associates using Boyle's revolver. Cissie, Dorwood, and McClusky escape in MacAskill's radio car and proceed to Aberdeen where Cissie hopes to find her child. Henderson, now in possession of the drugs and still holding MacAskill, goes to Aberdeen to catch up with O'May at his next engagement. The McPhail sisters go to Aberdeen hoping to perform again with O'May.

McCluskey declares his love for Cissie but she is non-committal. Together they find the address where the child is living, but she turns away without seeing him.

Henderson attempts to murder MacAskill with a drugs overdose. Dorwood, who has been contemplating suicide, finds Henderson about to deliver the drugs to O'May and leads him away at gunpoint. Henderson is later found dead and the audience is left to speculate on the fate of Dorwood and the drugs. McCluskey and Cissie find MacAskill and save her life.

McCluskey walks away from Cissie who he feels has been using him all along.

== Cast ==
- John Gordon-Sinclair as Frank McClusky
- Tilda Swinton as Cissie Crouch
- Kevin McMonagle as Dorwood Crouch
- Katy Murphy as Billie McPhail
- Ken Stott as Fraser Boyle
- Eddi Reader as Jolene Jowett
- Tom Watson as Eric the barber/Timberwolf Tierney/Cherokee George/Fr Tierney/Aberdeen matron
- Peter Mullan as Tonto
- Guy Mitchell as Jim Bob O'May
- Helen Atkinson-Wood as Tamara MacAskill
- Maggie Bell as Roxanne

== Episodes ==
1. "Throwing Up in The Gorbals"
2. "The Eagle of the Apocalypse and the Sidewinders of Satan"
3. "This Could Turn Septic On Us, Ya Big Ungrateful Midden"
4. "Happy Trails"
5. "Lay That Pistol Down Babe"
6. "The Last Round Up"

== Reception ==
Reception in the Scottish press was generally very positive, with Kenneth Wright in The Herald describing the series as "... funny, impressive, and very, very clever". The London press was generally negative with Richard Last in the Telegraph describing it as "incomprehensible", referring to both the plot and the Scottish dialect of which he wrote "At the start I was getting one word in three". Hugh Herbert in the Guardian was a rare positive voice calling it "a serial to stay home for".

Byrne later said he believed the series had a "loyal following of about three and a half million viewers" in the UK.

== Repeats and revival ==
The series was revived for Cinema performance first at the Dunoon Film Festival in 2013, then at the Glasgow Film Theatre in 2014.

The series was not made available for home viewing until a double DVD was released by Second Sight Films as 2NDVD3275 on 25 May 2015, almost 25 years after the television screening.

Byrne, speaking in an interview for the Herald in 2013, said that although he had been paid "double money up front" for the series to be repeated, it had not been at that time. It was eventually repeated on the BBC Scotland channel in 2019, twenty nine years after its first showing.

== Script ==
The script by John Byrne with illustrations by the author was published by BBC Books in 1990 as ISBN 0-563-36049-6.

== Music ==
Throughout the series many of the characters perform country and western standards in small pubs and clubs. The music was specially recorded for the series under the direction of Rab Noakes (credited as Robert Noakes) and Michael Marra. Backing tracks were pre-recorded and the vocals performed live on location by the cast.

=== Soundtrack album ===
The soundtrack album was released by BBC Enterprises as BBC CD 791 (5 011755 079123) and on cassette as ZCF 791. Performances were credited to the characters, rather than the performers. Vocals were re-recorded for the CD over the backing tracks originally recorded for the series. “From a Distance” was performed by Tilda Swinton as Cissie Crouch in the series, but the soundtrack performance is by Eddi Reader, credited as her character Jolene Jowett.

No.	Title	Writer(s)	Character(s) performing	Length
1.	"Your Cheatin Heart"	Hank Williams	Cissie Crouch and The McPhail Sisters	3:00
2.	"Jambalaya"	Hank Williams	Jim Bob O'May and The Wild Bunch	2:59
3.	"Don't Be Cruel"	Otis Blackwell, Elvis Presley	The McPhail Sisters	2:35
4.	"Always On My Mind"	Johnny Christopher, Mark James, Wayne Carson	Dorwood Crouch and The Deadwood Playboys	3:38
5.	"Hey Good Lookin'"	Hank Williams	Roxanne and Timberwolf	2:08
6.	"Quicksilver"	George Wyle, Eddie Pola, Irving Taylor	The McPhail Sisters	2:56
7.	"Running Wild"	Tom T Hall	Dorwood Crouch and The Deadwood Playboys	2:33
8.	"Deep Water"	Fred Rose	Jolene Jowett	2:47
9.	"Tennessee Waltz"	Redd Stewart, Pee Wee King	Jim Bob O'May and The Wild Bunch	3:01
10.	"You Are My Sunshine"	Jimmie Davis, Charles Mitchell	The Deadwood Playboys	1:57
11.	"From A Distance"	Julie Gold	Jolene Jowett	4:11
12.	"Settin' the Woods On Fire"	Ed Nelson, Fred Rose	Jim Bob O'May and The Wild Bunch	2:23
13.	"Your Cheatin' Heart"	Hank Williams	Dorwood Crouch and The Deadwood Playboys	2:54
14.	"Half As Much"	Curley Williams	Jolene Jowett	2:25
15.	"It Keeps Right On a-Hurtin'"	Johnny Tillotson	Jim Bob O'May and The Wild Bunch	3:02
16.	"Great Balls of Fire"	Otis Blackwell, Jack Hammer	The Wild Bunch	1:55
17.	"The End of the World"	Arthur Kent, Sylvia Dee	The McPhail Sisters	2:31
18.	"Hello Mary Lou"	Gene Pitney	Dorwood Crouch and The Deadwood Playboys	2:25
19.	"Singing The Blues"	Melvin Endsley	Jim Bob O'May and The Wild Bunch	2:13
20.	"Just Out Of Reach"	Virgil F Stewart	The McPhail Sisters	3:19
21.	"Lovesick Blues"	Cliff Friend, Irving Mills	Dorwood Crouch and The Deadwood Playboys	2:33
22.	"Sleepless Nights"	Felice and Boudleaux Bryant	Cissie Crouch	2:42
23.	"I Can't Stop Loving You"	Don Gibson	Fraser Boyle	2:54
24.	"Runnin' Wild"	Joseph W. Grey, Leo Wood, Arthur H. Gibbs	Jolene Jowett	1:48
25.	"Your Cheatin' Heart"	Hank Williams	Jim Bob O'May and The Wild Bunch	3:57
26.	"Your Cheatin' Heart"	Hank Williams	John Carmichael and his Scottish Dance Band	2:32
