= Of Mice and Men =

1937 novella by John Steinbeck

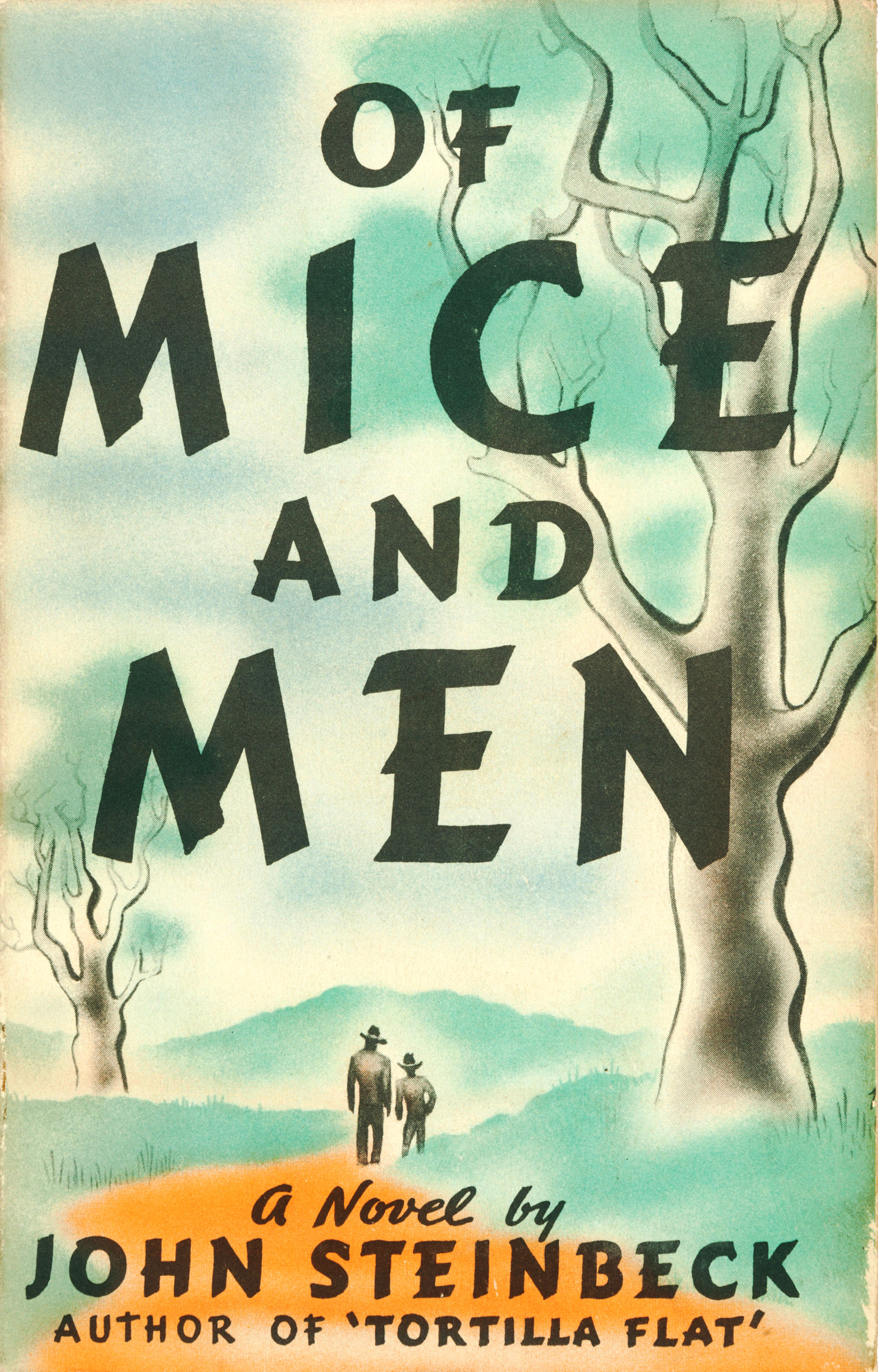
- First edition cover
- Author: John Steinbeck
- Cover artist: Ross MacDonald
- Language: English
- Genre: Tragedy, Dramatic Fiction
- Publisher: Covici Friede
- Publication date: 1937
- Publication place: United States
- Pages: 107

Of Mice and Men is a 1937 novella written by American author John Steinbeck. It describes the experiences of George Milton and Lennie Small, two displaced migrant ranch workers, as they move from place to place in California, searching for jobs during the Great Depression.

Steinbeck based the novella on his own experiences as a teenager working alongside migrant farm workers in the 1910s, before the arrival of the Okies whom he would describe in his novel The Grapes of Wrath. The title is taken from Robert Burns's poem "To a Mouse": "The best laid schemes o' mice an' men / Gang aft agley" ("The best-laid plans of mice and men / Often go awry").

Although the book is taught in many schools, Of Mice and Men has been a frequent target of censorship and book bans for vulgarity and for what some consider offensive and racist language. Consequently, it appears on the American Library Association's list of the Most Challenged Books of the 21st Century.

== Plot ==
During the Great Depression in California, two migrant field workers—George Milton, an intelligent but uneducated man, and Lennie Small, a bulky, strong but intellectually disabled man—are on their way from Soledad to another part of the state. They share a dream of settling down on their own piece of land. Lennie's part of the dream is merely to care for and pet rabbits. He loves touching soft animals, but he always pets them so hard that he accidentally kills them. George and Lennie fled from Weed after Lennie grabbed a young woman's skirt because he thought it was pretty. He would not let go, because he holds on tighter when stressed. This incident led to an accusation of rape, with a mob forming to find and lynch Lennie. Throughout the introduction of the novel, it becomes clear that Lennie relies on George because he is unable to function independently.

The pair are hired at a farm, where they are confronted by Curley, the short and aggressive son of the ranch's boss. Curley dislikes larger men and he targets Lennie, who is instantly attracted to Curley's flirtatious and provocative wife. The pair also meets Candy, an elderly ranch handyman with one hand and a loyal dog, and Slim, an intelligent and gentle jerkline-skinner whose dog has recently had a litter of puppies. Slim gives puppies to Lennie and to Candy, whose loyal, accomplished sheep dog was put down by fellow ranch-hand Carlson.

In spite of problems, their dream leaps towards reality when Candy offers to pitch in $350 toward the purchase of a farm, in return for permission to live with them. They will be able to buy a farm at the end of the month. The trio are ecstatic, but their joy is overshadowed when Curley attacks Lennie, who defends himself by easily crushing Curley's fist while urged on by George.

Nevertheless, George feels more relaxed. He even leaves Lennie behind on the ranch while he goes into town with the other hands. Lennie wanders into the stable, and chats with Crooks, the bitter, yet educated stable hand, who is isolated from the other workers because he is black. Candy finds them and they discuss their plans for the farm with Crooks, who cannot resist asking if he can hoe a garden patch on the farm, even though he scorns the possibility of the dream coming true. Curley's wife makes another appearance and flirts with the men, especially Lennie. However, she shows her spiteful side when she belittles them and threatens to have Crooks lynched. They hear the ranch hands returning, and she leaves.

The next day, Lennie accidentally kills his puppy while stroking it. Curley's wife enters the barn and tries to speak to him. She admits that she is lonely, her dreams of becoming a movie star having been crushed. She finds out about Lennie's love of soft things and offers to let him stroke her hair, but when she feels his strength, she panics and begins to scream. Lennie becomes frightened and unintentionally breaks her neck. He then runs away. When the other ranch hands find the corpse, they form a lynch mob intent on killing him, sending for the police before beginning the search. George quickly realizes that their dream is at an end and hurries to find Lennie, hoping he will be at the meeting place they designated in case he got into trouble.

George finds Lennie at the meeting spot, and the two sit together while George retells the beloved story of the dream, although he now knows it will never happen. George hears the lynch mob coming and shoots Lennie, giving him a more merciful death than the one he would receive at the hands of the mob. Curley, Slim, and Carlson arrive seconds later. Only Slim understands what has happened. He leads George away, trying to console him. Curley and Carlson look on, neither understanding why Slim and George are feeling the way they are.

== Characters ==
- George Milton: A quick-witted man who is Lennie's guardian and best friend. His friendship with Lennie helps sustain his dream of a better future. He has been friends with Lennie since they were children. He is described by Steinbeck in the novel as "small and quick", every part of him being "defined", with small strong hands on slender arms. He has a dark face and "restless eyes" and "sharp, strong features" including a "thin, bony nose".
- Lennie Small: A gigantic, physically strong "imbecile" who travels with George and is his constant companion. He dreams of "living off the fatta' the lan'" and being able to tend to rabbits. His love for soft things is a weakness, mostly because he does not know his own strength, and eventually becomes his undoing. Steinbeck defines his appearance as George's "opposite", writing that he is a "huge man, shapeless of face, with large, pale eyes" and "wide, sloping shoulders". Lennie walks heavily, dragging his feet a little, "the way a bear drags his paws", adding that his arms do not swing at his sides, but hang loosely.
- Candy: An aging ranch handyman, Candy lost his hand in an accident and worries about his future on the ranch. Fearing that his age is making him useless, he seizes on George's description of the farm he and Lennie will have, offering his life's savings if he can join George and Lennie in owning the land.
- Slim: A "jerkline skinner", the main driver of a mule team and the "prince of the ranch". Slim is greatly respected by many of the characters and is the only character whom Curley treats with respect. His insight, intuition, kindness and natural authority draw the other ranch hands automatically towards him, and he is significantly the only character to fully understand the bond between George and Lennie. Slim is considered the "Übermensch" of this story by the god-like descriptions of Slim that he is the one that knows best out of the novel's characters.
- Curley: The Boss's son, a young, pugnacious character, once a semi-professional boxer. He is described by others, with some irony, as "handy", partly because he likes to keep a glove filled with vaseline on his left hand. He is very jealous and protective of his wife and immediately develops a dislike toward Lennie. At one point, Curley loses his temper after he sees Lennie appear to laugh at him, and ends up with his hand horribly damaged after Lennie fights back against him.
- Curley's wife: A young, pretty woman who is mistrusted by her husband. The other characters refer to her only as "Curley's wife". Steinbeck explained that she is "not a person, she's a symbol. She has no function, except to be a foil – and a danger to Lennie." In a later letter Steinbeck sent to Claire Luce, the actress playing Curley's wife in the stage production of Of Mice and Men, Steinbeck describes Curley's wife as a lonely and frightened young woman whose harsh, flirtatious behavior is actually a method of defense against her fear for isolation and desperate craving for companionship. Curley's wife's preoccupation with her own beauty eventually helps precipitate her death: she allows Lennie to stroke her hair as an apparently harmless indulgence, only for her to upset Lennie when she yells at him to stop him "mussing it". Lennie tries to stop her yelling and eventually kills her accidentally by breaking her neck.
- Crooks: Crooks, the black stable-hand, gets his name from his crooked back. Proud, bitter, and cynical, he is isolated from the other men because of the color of his skin. Despite himself, Crooks becomes fond of Lennie, and though he claims to have seen countless men following empty dreams of buying their own land, he asks Lennie if he can go with them and hoe in the garden. Crooks is a more relatable individual who sees things from a more rational and human perspective.
- Candy's dog: A blind dog who is described as "old", "stinky", and "crippled", and is killed by Carlson.
- Carlson: A "thick bodied" ranch hand, he kills Candy's dog with little sympathy.
- The Boss: Curley's father, the superintendent of the ranch. The ranch is owned by "a big land company" according to Candy.
- Whit: A young ranch hand.

== Themes ==
In every bit of honest writing in the world there is a base theme. Try to understand men, if you understand each other you will be kind to each other. Knowing a man well never leads to hate and nearly always leads to love. There are shorter means, many of them. There is writing promoting social change, writing punishing injustice, writing in celebration of heroism, but always that base theme. Try to understand each other.

— John Steinbeck in his 1938 journal entry

Steinbeck emphasizes aspirations throughout the book. George aspires to become independent, to be his own boss, to have a homestead, and, most important, to be "somebody". Lennie aspires to be with George on his independent homestead, and to quench his fixation on soft objects. Candy aspires to reassert his responsibility lost with the death of his dog, and for security for his old age—on George's homestead. Crooks aspires to a small homestead where he can express self-respect, security, and most of all, acceptance. Curley's wife dreams to be an actress, to satisfy her desire for fame lost when she married Curley, and an end to her loneliness.

Loneliness is a significant factor in several characters' lives. Candy is lonely after his dog is gone. Curley's wife is lonely because her husband is not the friend she hoped for—she deals with her loneliness by flirting with the men on the ranch, which causes Curley to increase his abusiveness and jealousy. The companionship of George and Lennie is the result of loneliness. Crooks states the theme candidly as "A guy goes nuts if he ain't got anybody. Don't make any difference who the guy is, long's he's with you." The author further reinforces this theme through subtle methods by situating the story near the town of Soledad, which means "solitude" in Spanish.

Despite the need for companionship, Steinbeck emphasizes how loneliness is sustained through the barriers established from acting inhuman to one another. The loneliness of Curley's wife is upheld by Curley's jealousy, which causes all the ranch hands to avoid her. Crooks's barrier results from being barred from the bunkhouse by restraining him to the stable; his bitterness is partially broken, however, through Lennie's ignorance.

Steinbeck's characters are often powerless, due to intellectual, economic, and social circumstances. Lennie possesses the greatest physical strength of any character, which should therefore establish a sense of respect as he is employed as a ranch hand. However, his intellectual handicap undercuts this and results in his powerlessness. Economic powerlessness is established as many of the ranch hands are victims of the Great Depression. As George, Candy and Crooks are positive, action-oriented characters, they wish to purchase a homestead, but because of the Depression, they are unable to earn enough money to fulfill their dream. Lennie is the only one who is basically unable to take care of himself, but the other characters would do this in the improved circumstances they seek. Since they cannot do so, the real danger of Lennie's mental handicap comes to the fore.

Regarding human interaction, the evil of oppression and abuse is a theme that is illustrated through Curley and Curley's wife. Curley uses his aggressive nature and superior position in an attempt to take control of his father's farm. He constantly reprimands the farm hands and accuses some of fooling around with his wife. Curley's Napoleon complex is evidenced by his threatening of the farm hands for minuscule incidents. Curley's wife, on the other hand, is not physically but verbally manipulative. She uses her sex appeal to gain some attention, flirting with the farm hands. According to the Penguin Teacher's Guide for Of Mice and Men, Curley and Curley's wife represent evil in that both oppress and abuse the migrants in different ways.

Fate is felt most heavily as the characters' aspirations are destroyed when George is unable to protect Lennie (who is a real danger). Steinbeck presents this as "something that happened" or as his friend coined for him "non-teleological thinking" or "is thinking", which postulates a non-judgmental point of view.

Of Mice and Men can be associated with the idea that inherent limitations exist and despite all the squirming and struggling, sometimes the circumstances of one's existence limits their capacity to live the fairy tale lives they wish to. Even the title of the novel itself references this "the title is, of course, a fragment from the poem by Robert Burns, which gives emphasis to the idea of the futility of human endeavor or the vanity of human wishes".

Animals play a role in the story as well; the heron shifts from a beautiful part of the scenery from the beginning of the novel to a predator near the end. The ending chapter has the heron return, preying upon snakes that get too curious in a repetitive nature, symbolic of the dreams of men constantly being snatched away.

== Development ==
Of Mice and Men was Steinbeck's first attempt at writing in the form of novel-play termed a "play-novelette" by one critic. Structured in three acts of two chapters each, it is intended to be both a novella and a script for a play. It is only 30,000 words in length. Steinbeck wanted to write a novel that could be played from its lines, or a play that could be read like a novel.

Steinbeck originally titled it Something That Happened (referring to the events of the book as "something that happened" because nobody can be really blamed for the tragedy that unfolds in the story). However, he changed the title after reading Robert Burns's poem "To a Mouse". Burns's poem tells of the regret the narrator feels for having destroyed the home of a mouse while plowing his field.

Steinbeck wrote this book and The Grapes of Wrath in what is now Monte Sereno, California. An early draft of Of Mice and Men was eaten by Steinbeck's dog. As he explained in a 1936 letter:

My setter pup [Toby], left alone one night, made confetti of about half of my [manuscript] book. Two months [sic] work to do over again. It sets me back. There was no other draft. I was pretty mad, but the poor little fellow may have been acting critically.

In the introduction to Penguin's 1994 edition of the book, Susan Shillinglaw writes that Steinbeck, after dropping out of Stanford University, spent almost two years roaming California, finding work on ranches for Spreckels Sugar where he harvested wheat and sugar beets.

Steinbeck told The New York Times in 1937:

I was a bindlestiff myself for quite a spell. I worked in the same country that the story is laid in. The characters are composites to a certain extent. Lennie was a real person. He's in an insane asylum in California right now. I worked alongside him for many weeks. He didn't kill a girl. He killed a ranch foreman. Got sore because the boss had fired his pal and stuck a pitchfork right through his stomach. I hate to tell you how many times. I saw him do it. We couldn't stop him until it was too late.

== Reception ==
Attaining the greatest positive response of any of his works up to that time, Steinbeck's novella was chosen as a Book of the Month Club selection before it was published. Praise for the work came from many notable critics, including Maxine Garrard (Enquirer-Sun), Christopher Morley, and Harry Thornton Moore (New Republic). New York Times critic Ralph Thompson described the novella as a "grand little book, for all its ultimate melodrama". In the UK, it was listed at number 52 of the "nation's best loved novels" on the BBC's 2003 survey The Big Read.

== Censorship ==
The novella has been banned from various US public and school libraries or curricula for allegedly "promoting euthanasia", "condoning racial slurs", being "anti-business", containing profanity, and generally containing "vulgar", "offensive language", and containing racial stereotypes, as well as the negative impact of these stereotypes on students. Many of the bans and restrictions have been lifted and it remains required reading in many other American, Australian, Irish, British, New Zealand and Canadian schools.

As a result of being a frequent target of censors, Of Mice and Men appears on the American Library Association's list of the Top 100 Banned/Challenged Books: 2000–2009 (number five) and Top 100 Banned/Challenged Books: 2010–2019 (number 28). Of Mice and Men has been proposed for censorship 54 times since it was published in 1936. However, scholars including Thomas Scarseth have fought to protect the book by arguing its literary value. According to Scarseth, "in true great literature, the pain of Life is transmuted into the beauty of Art".

== Adaptations ==
=== Stage ===
As a "playable novel", it was performed by the Theater Union of San Francisco as written. This version opened on May 21, 1937 – less than three months after the novel's publication – and ran for about two months.

To create a Broadway production, Steinbeck adapted and slightly revised his original text and this version, produced by Sam H. Harris and directed by George S. Kaufman, opened on November 23, 1937, in the Music Box Theatre on Broadway and ran for 207 performances. It starred Wallace Ford as George and Broderick Crawford as Lennie. The role of Crooks was performed by Leigh Whipper, the first African-American member of the Actors' Equity Association. (Whipper repeated this role in the 1939 film version.) The production was chosen as Best Play in 1938 by the New York Drama Critics' Circle.

In 1939 the production was moved to Los Angeles, still with Wallace Ford in the role of George, but with Lon Chaney, Jr., taking on the role of Lennie. Chaney's performance in the role resulted in his casting in the movie.

In 1958, a musical theater adaptation by Ira Bilowit (1925–2016) was produced Off-Broadway in New York City. The cast included several in-demand performers of their day, including Art Lund and Jo Sullivan, re-teamed after performing together in the hit musical The Most Happy Fella, as well as Leo Penn. However, a newspaper strike negatively affected the production and it closed after six weeks. A revival of the work was mounted at the Western Stage in Salinas, California in 2019.

The play was revived in a 1974 Broadway production in the Brooks Atkinson Theatre starring Kevin Conway as George and James Earl Jones as Lennie. Noted stage actress Pamela Blair played Curley's Wife in this production.

In 1970 Carlisle Floyd wrote an opera based on this novella. One departure between Steinbeck's book and Floyd's opera is that the opera features The Ballad Singer, a character not found in the book.

A new version of the play opened on Broadway at The Longacre Theater on March 19, 2014 for a limited 18-week engagement, starring James Franco, Chris O'Dowd, Leighton Meester and Jim Norton.

A ballet adaptation was created by Cathy Marston with original music by Thomas Newman. It debuted on April 27, 2022 at the Joffrey Ballet in Chicago.

=== Film ===
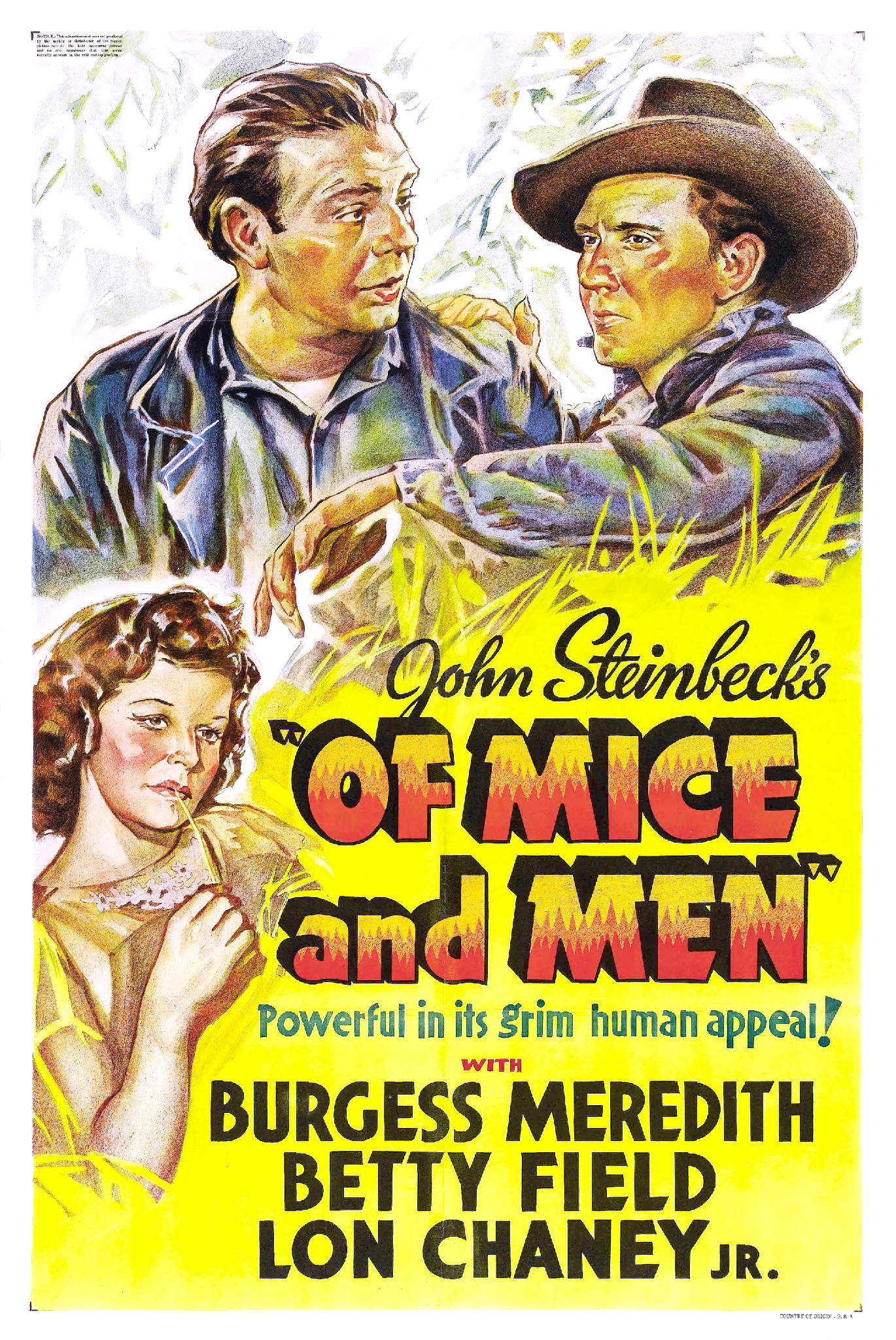
Poster for the 1939 film

The first film adaptation was released in 1939, two years after the publication of the novella, and starred Lon Chaney Jr. as Lennie, with Burgess Meredith as George, and was directed by Lewis Milestone. It was nominated for four Academy Awards.

A TV version, produced by David Susskind in 1968, starred George Segal as George, Nicol Williamson as Lennie, Will Geer as Candy, Moses Gunn as Crooks, and Don Gordon and Joey Heatherton as Curley and his wife, respectively.

In 1981, a TV movie version was released, starring Randy Quaid as Lennie, and Robert Blake as George, and directed by Reza Badiyi.

Another theatrical film version was made in 1992, directed by Gary Sinise, who was nominated for the Palme d'Or at Cannes. Sinise played George, and the role of Lennie was played by John Malkovich, both reprising their roles from the 1980 Steppenwolf Theatre Company stage production.

The 1992 Malayalam film Soorya Manasam directed by Viji Thampi is also based on the novel.

=== Radio ===
Of Mice and Men was adapted by Donna Franceschild as a radio play directed by Kirsty Williams starring David Tennant and Liam Brennan broadcast on BBC Radio 4 on 7 March 2010. Earlier BBC productions were aired in 1966 and 1992.
