= Takin' Over the Asylum =

Scottish television series

- Created by: Donna Franceschild
- Directed by: David Blair
- Starring: Ken Stott; David Tennant
- Composer: Junior Campbell
- Country of origin: United Kingdom
- Original language: English
- No. of series: 1
- No. of episodes: 6

Production
- Producer: Chris Parr
- Editor: Ian Farr
- Running time: 50 minutes
- Production company: BBC Scotland

Original release
- Network: BBC Two
- Release: 27 September – 1 November 1994

Takin' Over the Asylum is a six-part BBC Scotland television drama about a hospital radio station in a Glasgow psychiatric hospital. The show was written by Donna Franceschild, produced by Chris Parr and directed by David Blair.

The show follows a double glazing salesman Eddie McKenna (Ken Stott) who re-establishes a hospital radio station at St Jude's, a psychiatric hospital, with patients as its presenters and volunteers, notably Campbell (David Tennant).

== Development ==
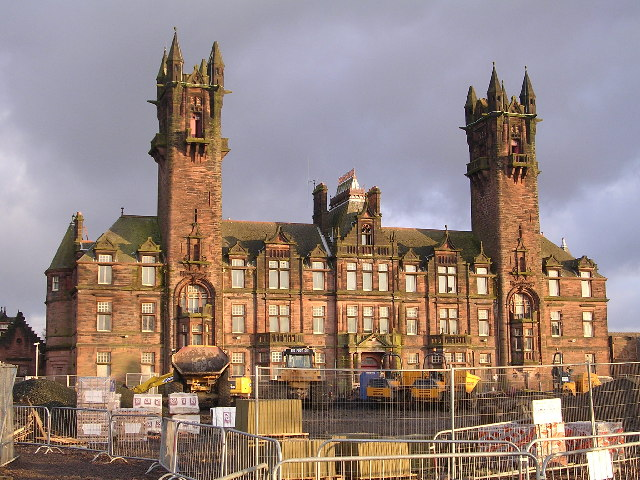
The series was filmed in a disused wing of Gartloch Hospital

David Blair, a producer at BBC Scotland, suggested to writer Donna Franceschild that she develop a minor character into one of her plays. She says, "The character was a hospital radio DJ called Ready Eddie, and I asked if I could set the drama in a mental hospital... We just thought it would make a great story." Franceschild's motivation for writing the series, Birch notes, "originated from personal experience, her intention to critically challenge accepted views about mental illness."

The working title for the programme was "Making Waves"; the title was changed by the producer and the controller of BBC Two following pre-broadcast research. The new title alludes to the phrase 'lunatics have taken over the asylum', when policy has gone wrong.

The series was filmed in a disused wing of Gartloch Hospital, a psychiatric hospital on the outskirts of Glasgow. Director David Blair, who had cast David Tennant in a small part in the series Strathblair, recommended that Tennant should audition for the role of Campbell. Talking of the series in 2003, Tennant says that "probably every job since then has been either directly or indirectly because of that."

== Cast ==
- Eddie McKenna (Ken Stott), an alcoholic double glazing salesman and aspiring disc jockey, develops the hospital radio station with the help of several of the patients at the hospital, including:
- Campbell Bain (David Tennant) – a nineteen-year-old, enthusiastic contributor to the station, who has bipolar disorder (formerly known as manic depression).
- Francine Boyle (Katy Murphy) – a long-term depressive patient who self harms to whom Eddie is attracted.
- Fergus MacKinnon (Angus Macfadyen) – an electrical engineer, who has schizophrenia and a tendency to escape the hospital and then return.
- Rosalie Gerrity (Ruth McCabe) – a middle-aged housewife who has OCD regarding cleanliness and is separating from her husband.
- Jim Gerrity (Jon Morrison) - Husband of Rosalie Gerrity, he refuses to accept her home until she is 'normal'.
- Campbell's Dad (James Grant) - Is unsupportive of Campbell's dream of being a DJ.
- Grandma (Elizabeth Spriggs) - Eddie's Lithuanian grandmother who lives with him and is eager for him to find a wife.
- Isabel (Angela Bruce) - The principal nurse at St Jude's, who is very supportive of the radio station.
- Mr Gordon Griffin (Roy Hanlon) - Eddie's boss at TwinView windows, who encourages Eddie to give up the radio in order to dedicate more time to his job.
- John MacAteer (Neil McKinven) - Eddie's work rival at TwinView windows.
- Paula (Arabella Weir) - Eddie's contact at Radio Scotland, who Eddie and Campbell use to try and get their own radio show.
- Evelyn McDonald (Sandra Voe) - part of the hospital board, she comes to inspect the station.

== Episodes ==
Each of the episodes is named after a popular song.

No.	Title	Directed by	Original release date
1	"Hey Jude"	David Blair	27 September 1994
Double-glazing salesman Eddie McKenna is asked to leave his long-term hospital radio show, but is invited to re-establish the radio station at St Jude's, a psychiatric hospital. He meets Campbell Bain, a 19-year-old patient who has manic depression, and Nana, a patient said to be "speaking in tongues" and always humming a tune. Eddie is encouraged to do better in his job by his boss. His first show is not a success, and the patients at the hospital group outside the radio station and leave. As he is leaving the asylum, he sees a woman having a breakdown, but passes by. He takes on Campbell as an assistant for the radio station to train him. On his second day, he meets the woman he'd previously seen, discovering that her name is Francine, and sees her put out her cigarette on her arm. During his first show, the television breaks, attracting the inmates to listen to the music, including Francine for whom he especially plays Help! by The Beatles. Unfortunately, the mixing desk breaks, and an inmate named Fergus comes in to fix it, but is forcibly restrained. It is revealed that he was an electrician and was trying to help. He later tells Eddie that he "hears voices" and is schizophrenic, and that he was the one who broke the television on purpose. Eddie discovers a song with the same title as what Nana is singing, and asks his Lithuanian grandmother if she recognises it, which she denies, explaining that it is in Latvian. An interpreter is found for Nana and she is released from the hospital.
2	"Fly Like an Eagle"	David Blair	4 October 1994
The supervisor for the hospital radio, Evelyn McDonald, comes in to enquire about the radio station. Fergus asks for several things to improve it, including a new mixing desk. She asks for figures before anything can be given by the hospital board. Campbell's dad comes to visit, and informs him that he is going to be discharged next week, and asks him about his plans for the future. Eddie sees Francine by an open window as he is leaving, and offers her his coat. They talk for a while about her detainment and Eddie's work as a DJ. Eddie meets an old woman named Harriet who keeps talking to him and follows him to his job. His boss gives him an ultimatum to make a sale by Saturday or else lose his job. When Eddie arrives, Campbell tells Eddie of his desire to become a professional DJ, and asks Eddie why he hasn't gone professional. Campbell proposes a plan to make the hospital radio show more popular, banking on its unique quality of having "loonies". Eddie talks to Francine about his grandmother and her plans for his marriage, and invites her to go out in his car with him. Francine talks about the cat, McTavish, and Eddie corrects her about the cat's gender, saying that she's pregnant, which Francine immediately denies and leaves the room. Back at the asylum, Campbell's dad arrives and Campbell tells him he wants to be a DJ, a plan his father disapproves of, saying that they want to send him to Perth with his Auntie Susan, and threatens to have him sectioned. Eddie arrives at the asylum, along with Evelyn, to discover that Rosalie did the figures he needed. Evelyn tells him that the patients cannot participate in the radio station. Harriet approaches Eddie and tells him she wants to buy his double glazing, and shows him her large house - with 35 windows. Campbell, locked in the radio station, enters a manic episode, and is forcibly stopped by being tranquillised. When Eddie, now Salesman of the Month visits him, Campbell describes his episode as "great acting", and says he is interned for 6 to 10 more weeks. Eddie asks Rosalie to be his station manager.
3	"You Always Hurt the One You Love"	David Blair	11 October 1994
4	"Fool On The Hill"	David Blair	18 October 1994
5	"Rainy Night in Georgia"	David Blair	25 October 1994
Campbell, Eddie, Rosalie, and Francine are at Fergus' wake, and are the only mourners at his funeral. Eddie asks Francine to pretend to be his girlfriend to please his grandmother before she leaves for Lithuania, and she accepts. Eddie and Campbell successfully do their show at BBC Scotland, but upon coming back to St. Jude's, discover that Rosalie has been discharged. MacAteer tries to sabotage Eddie at work, slashing his tyres and trapping him in a cupboard, but McKenna manages to get to the meeting nearly on time. He and Francine go to his grandmother's party, where he introduces Francine as his girlfriend, and they dance. In his car after leaving the party, Eddie confesses his interest in her to Francine, but she reveals that she has self-harm scars. At the meeting with BBC Scotland, Paula tells Eddie that they are open to his having a show on odd slots, but only without Campbell. Eddie refuses the offer. Later, Francine confesses to Eddie that she was continually raped as a child, and got thrown out when she became pregnant, and had to leave the baby. The SSPCA, called by Stuart, come to take away the kittens.
6	"Let It Be"	David Blair	1 November 1994

== Critical reaction and awards ==
As the transmission date neared, senior BBC executives grew nervous because of the subject matter. Franceschild says the show had the "dubious distinction of being the first ever programme on BBC2 to be subjected to focus groups". Despite the first episode being scheduled against European football on BBC One and Soldier Soldier on ITV, the show attracted positive reviews, including from Time Out and Daily Mirror.

The show won the 1995 BAFTA TV Award for Best Drama Serial and Best Editing, RTS Award for Best Writer, Mental Health in the Media Award and the Scottish BAFTA for Best Serial and for Best Writer.

Glasgow Media Group scholar Greg Philo comments that the series was "a fairly radical approach to the portrayal of mental illness", noting that it was praised by mental health service users.

== DVD release and repeat showings ==
Despite its critical success, Franscechild claims that the BBC remained nervous because of its subject matter. It never received the expected BBC One repeat, instead receiving a late-night repeat showing on BBC Two. The series was then ignored for many years. However, in the mid 2000s, the show was illegally uploaded to YouTube, a move which delighted Franceschild as it brought her work to a wider audience.

The series BBC DVD was released on 9 June 2008 and the show was re-run on BBC Four, beginning August 2008 with two episodes shown back-to-back over three consecutive Saturday evenings. Due to music copyright issues, Junior Campbell who wrote the incidental music, was also commissioned to record cover versions of most of the original hits included in the series soundtrack. These were dubbed on the original worldwide television transmissions (excluding UK) and also on the series BBC DVD.

== Adaptation ==
Franceschild has adapted the BBC show for the stage. It is directed by Mark Thomson and was co-produced by the Citizens Theatre and Royal Lyceum Theatre, Edinburgh in 2013. Franceschild says, “A lot’s changed since Takin’ Over the Asylum was aired in 1994. This stage version is set in a world of mobile phones, the internet and zillions of channels of digital television. But two things haven’t changed. Sixties Soul Music is still the Greatest Popular Music of All Time, and people with mental health problems are still stigmatised, discriminated against in the workplace, depicted as ‘disability junkies’, ignored, shunned, even physically assaulted.” The production attracted positive reviews.

In May 2022, Takin’ Over the Asylum was performed by BA Acting students at the Royal Conservatoire of Scotland, also directed by Mark Thomson.
