= The River (British TV series) =

- Genre: Sitcom
- Written by: Michael Aitkens
- Directed by: Susan Belbin
- Starring: David Essex; Katy Murphy
- Country of origin: United Kingdom
- Original language: English
- No. of series: 1
- No. of episodes: 6

Production
- Producer: Susan Belbin
- Running time: 30 minutes

Original release
- Network: BBC One
- Release: 20 October – 24 November 1988

The River is a British TV series from 1988 starring David Essex, Katy Murphy, and David Ryall. The River was first shown on BBC1 in late 1988. Original release was on 20 October – 24 November 1988.

== Plot ==
The River follows the tranquil life of lovable, Cockney, ex-convict Davey Jackson (Essex) who is lock keeper on the canal near the village of Chumley-on-the-Water. His peaceful life is turned upside down by the arrival of the neurotic, sharp-tongued Sarah MacDonald (Murphy). Over the six episodes of the series the love-hate relationship between Davey and Sarah blossoms into a shaky romance, their potential happiness often spoiled by the machinations of Davey's cunning Aunty Betty (Vilma Hollingbery) and the hapless intervention of Davey's deputy Tom Pike (Shaun Scott).

The River also shows brief glimpses of the village of Chumley and its inhabitants, including the eccentric squire, Colonel Danvers (David Ryall), the constantly drunken Silent Jim, landlord of the village pub "The Ferret", Aunty Betty's futile attempts to lead a socialist revolution from the village and Tom's conversations with his pets Deidre the goat and Cyril the pig.

The River ends abruptly with Sarah's decision to leave, partly due to her nervousness about her relationship with Davey and the ploys of Aunty Betty to get rid of her. At the very end of Episode Six, Sarah's narrowboat explodes after Tom forgets to replace a faulty gas pipe on it. Sarah, much to Davey's relief, survives (and is found floating on a piece of wreckage in the river). The episode ends with Davey and Sarah floating down the river on the remains of the narrowboat.

== Production ==
The River was first shown on BBC1 in October/November 1988 and repeated in May/June 1989, written by Michael Aitkens, with theme and incidental music written by Essex.

Chumley-on-the-Water is a fictional location for the filming. In reality, it was filmed at Wootton Rivers on the Kennet and Avon Canal near Marlborough, Wiltshire.

The producer/director of The River, Susan Belbin, claimed that the series was not meant to be a sitcom but a romantic comedy, the relationship between Davey and Sarah being the main focus of the programme. The outcome was different from Belbin's aim, however, as The River became more of a sitcom and the Davey-Sarah relationship became a strand of the programme.

Despite being heavily trailed by BBC One and moderate ratings for the first episode, the series was not a success. Essex later commented in an interview that he put it down to "the series not knowing quite what it wanted to be... nor indeed the BBC (knowing what they wanted it to be) either", also suggesting the series had suffered from poor direction and "wasn't what (he) had initially signed up for". Whilst the prospect of a second series at first seemed possible during filming, Essex stated that "...About three quarters of the way through the filming, I think it became apparent that we were going to be a one-run affair, as (the series) just didn't hang together well enough".
