= Fletcher Mathers =

Scottish actress

- Mathers in 2018
- Born: 1963 (age 62–63); Scone, Scotland
- Citizenship: United Kingdom
- Occupations: Actress; Voice actress; Director
- Years active: 1989–present
- Known for: Announcer for ScotRail trains
- Mathers voice Her recreation of the ScotRail train announcement from 2018; Recorded April 27, 2018

Fletcher Mathers (born 1963) is a Scottish actress and director who was the announcer for ScotRail trains from 2005 to 2025, before being replaced by a text-to-speech voice provided by ReadSpeaker. She has also appeared in Television series, theatrical plays and short films.

== Life and career ==
Mathers was born on 1963 in Scone, Perthshire and was trained at the Royal Scottish Academy of Music and Drama in Glasgow.

Mathers has worked in television, appearing in the series Taggart in 1990 and Shetland in 2013. In theatre, she was in The 306: Day at Station Hotel, Perth from 2017, Sylvia Dow and Secret Wrapped in Lead in 2023, and Maiden Mother Mage in 2025.

In 2005, Mathers recorded announcements for ScotRail trains, including the approach for each stop, with the voice lines being recorded in Nottingham. Over the next 20 years she recorded occasional additions and updates to the recordings.

In 2025, ScotRail started rolling out a new AI voice, which was provided by ReadSpeaker, for their service, replacing older messages recorded by Mathers. Mathers only learned she was being replaced after a friend heard the new synthetic voice on board. In an interview with The National, Mathers said it had been "a bit hurtful that they hadn't informed me that they were changing".

Mathers also directed the play Katie Morag with actress Sally Reid, in 2007. Mathers was the star of the 2010 short film Choices, which was nominated for the 2010 British Academy Scotland New Talent Awards.

== Filmography ==
Television
Year	Title	Role	Notes	Ref.
1989	The Play on One	Brenda	Govan Ghost Story	
1990	Taggart	Lillias Blacklock	Series 6, Episode 2	
1991	City Lights (1984 TV series)	Miss Goole	Series 6, Episode 7	
1994	Doctor Finlay	Fiona Sturges	Series 3, Episode 1	
2012	Dani's House	Grandma Judith	Series 5, Episode 12	
2013	Shetland	Bridal Shop Owner	Series 3, Episode 3	

Theatrical plays
Year	Title	Role	Notes	Ref.
2007	Katie Morag		Director	
2017	The 306: Day at Station Hotel, Perth		Written by Oliver Emanuel	
2023	Sylvia Dow			
2023	Secret Wrapped in Lead			
2025	Maiden Mother Mage			

Short film
Year	Title	Role	Notes	Ref.
2010	Choices	The Woman		
2017	Do Not Disturb	Carla		
