= Cathy (play) =

2026 play by Eilidh Loan

- Official poster of the 2026 Fringe production
- Original language: English
- Written by: Eilidh Loan

Premiere
- Date: 9 August 2026
- Place: Traverse Theatre, Edinburgh

Cathy is a 2026 play written and directed by Eilidh Loan. A comedy about grief, it received its world premiere performance at the Traverse Theatre, Edinburgh as part of the Edinburgh Festival Fringe.

The play is written and directed by Eilidh Loan, with dramaturgy by Johnny McKnight. It features design by Kenny Miller, lighting by Grant Anderson and compositions and sound design by Gary Cameron. A typical performance runs for sixty-five minutes.

The play was published by Methuen Drama in September 2026.

== Cast and characters ==
Character	World Premiere
Character	2026
Cathy	Elaine C. Smith
Flo	Michele Gallagher
Amy	Chloe Hodgson
Lizzie	Sally Reid
Colin	Alan Orr
