= Una McLean =

Scottish actress and comedian (born 1930)

Una McLean MBE
- Born: 12 January 1930 (age 96); Strathaven, Lanarkshire, Scotland
- Education: Royal Scottish Academy of Music and Drama
- Occupations: Actress, comedian
- Spouse: Russell Hunter (m. 1991; died 2004)

Una McLean MBE (born 12 January 1930) is a Scottish retired actress and comedian. She is best known for appearing in pantomimes. She was married to Scottish stage and film actor Russell Hunter from 1991 until his death in 2004.

McLean trained at the Royal Scottish Academy of Music and Drama and began her career at the Byre Theatre in St Andrews in 1955. She joined the Citizens' Theatre in Glasgow in 1959. From 1965 she starred in her own show for Scottish Television, Over to Una, and In 1967 she starred in Scotland's first one-woman television show, Did you see Una? She featured in the Thames Television production of a dramatization of the Jilly Cooper novel Emily. She has appeared in several films, including Peter Capaldi's Strictly Sinatra in 2001.

McLean has appeared in many pantomimes in Scotland, often starring opposite Jimmy Logan and with Stanley Baxter. She starred in Jack and the Beanstalk alongside Jimmy Logan in his last pantomime appearance at King's Theatre, Glasgow as Wondergran, a show that also featured Alyson McInnes, John Ramage, and Euan McIver.

In 2006, she was awarded the MBE. She appeared in 2007 on television in the sitcom Still Game. In 2009 she began playing the role of Molly O'Hara in the BBC One Scotland soap opera River City. In May 2019, she announced her retirement from the show.

== Theatre ==
Year	Title	Role	Company	Theatre	Director	Notes
1989	The Guid Sisters	Germaine Lauzon	The Tron Theatre Company	Tron Theatre, Glasgow	Michael Boyd	play by Michel Tremblay, translated into Scots by Bill Findlay and Martin Bowman

== Radio ==
Date	Title	Role	Director	Station
19 September 2005	The Sundowner	Betty	Lu Kemp	BBC Radio 4 Afternoon Play
9 January 2008	Jimmy Murphy Makes Amends	Phyllis	Kirsty Williams	BBC Radio 4 Afternoon Play
8 September 2009	Meryl the Mounted	Bunty Lobe	Kirsty Williams	BBC Radio 4 Afternoon Play
