= Donna Franceschild =

American-born British television writer and dramatist

- Born: November 22, 1953 (age 72) Illinois
- Occupation: Writer
- Education: University of California, Los Angeles
- Genre: Drama
- Notable awards: BAFTA Best Drama Serial 1994; Takin' Over the Asylum; Mental Health Media Award 1995; Takin' Over the Asylum; Mental Health Media Award 2001; Donovan Quick

Donna Franceschild (born November 22, 1953, in Illinois) is a British-based television writer and dramatist, originally from the US. She has written various plays and television shows, but her best-known work is the BBC series Takin' Over the Asylum.

== Career ==
She came to public attention as the writer of Takin' Over the Asylum, a six-part series about a hospital radio station in a psychiatric hospital. It was first broadcast in 1994 and starred Ken Stott and David Tennant. As well as the 1994 BAFTA for Best Drama Serial, the series won the 1995 Mental Health Media Award. Franceschild won a second MHM award in 2001 for the film Donovan Quick.

She wrote the four-part series A Mug's Game (1996) and adapted Robert McLiam Wilson's novel Eureka Street for the BBC (Northern Ireland), which was first broadcast in September 1999.

By the 2000s, political drama was seen as anachronistic. However, she "swam against the tide", as she describes, by writing and producing a three-part drama The Key, about three generations of working class women in Glasgow. She said "We live in cynical times and it's easy to become jaded by the machinations of power and politics. I wrote The Key to try and remind us that, though we are shaped by our history, sometimes the reverse is also true."

She has continuously supported the cause of raising awareness and understanding of mental health issues, and has served on the jury of the Mental Health Media awards since 1996. Her 2008 play, Lost in Plain Sight, charted one young man’s recovery from a suicide attempt. In 2010, Franceschild adapted Steinbeck's Of Mice and Men for radio, starring David Tennant and Liam Brennan. Among recent projects are two new plays for Radio Four and a commission to write a single television drama for Channel Four.

She is Creative Writing Fellow, Universities of Glasgow and Strathclyde.

== Credits ==
=== TV and film ===
TV credits include: The Key, Eureka Street, A Mug's Game, Takin' Over the Asylum, And the Cow Jumped Over the Moon, Bobbin' and Weavin', The Necklace

Film credit: Donovan Quick

=== Radio ===
- Quartet, BBC Radio 4, 13 November 2008
- The Lottery Ticket, BBC Radio 4, 18 February 2009
- The Ca'd'oro Cafe, BBC Radio 4, 26 January 2010
- Of Mice and Men (dramatisation), BBC Radio 4, 7 March 2010
- Down and Out in Auchangaish, BBC Radio 4, 19 December 2011

=== Theatre ===
Theatre credits include: And the Cow Jumped Over the Moon (1990), The Sunshine Cafe (1989), Rebel! (1986), Songs for Stray Cats and Other Living Creatures (1985), Tap Dance on a Telephone Line (1981), Mutiny on the Ml, Diaries, The Soap Opera (1979), The Cleaning Lady.
