= Stanley Dangerfield =

- Born: 1911
- Died: 28 September 1988 (aged 76–77)
- Occupation: Dog show judge

Stanley Dangerfield (1911–1988) was a dog-show judge, active particularity in the United Kingdom, and United States, but also working in dozens of other countries.

He started out owning Poodles and went on to also own Griffons Bruxellois. His most well known was Chosendale Seamus (breed by Desmond Gregory).

== Career ==
Stanley Dangerfield wrote about dogs for the Daily Express and Sunday Express, and presented Crufts dog show on television for the BBC for 27 years, until retirement in 1981. He had a column in the newspaper for the dog world, Our Dogs. He was a critic of the Kennel Club.

He appeared as a castaway on the BBC Radio programme Desert Island Discs on 29 March 1975.

Dangerfield appeared as himself on 10 September 1962 episode of the CBS game show To Tell the Truth.

He died on 28 September 1988, shortly after having a stroke, aged 77.

== Bibliography ==
- ——; Howell, Elsworth (1971). The international encyclopedia of dogs. Pelham. ISBN 978-0070152960.
