= New Town Killers =

- Theatrical poster
- Directed by: Richard Jobson
- Written by: Richard Jobson
- Produced by: Luc Roeg
- Starring: Dougray Scott; Alastair Mackenzie; James Anthony Pearson
- Cinematography: Simon Dennis
- Edited by: Steven Sander
- Music by: Stephen Hilton
- Distributed by: High Fliers
- Release date: 2008
- Running time: 97 minutes
- Country: United Kingdom
- Language: English

New Town Killers is a 2008 British drama film written and directed by Richard Jobson, starring James Anthony Pearson and Dougray Scott. New Town Killers follows two business men, portrayed by Dougray Scott and Alastair Mackenzie, who play macabre cat and mouse games with people from the fringes of society.

The film was an official selection for both The Times BFI London Film Festival, 2008 and The International Thessaloniki Film Festival, 2008.

== Plot ==
Two private bankers, Alistair (Scott) and Jamie (Mackenzie), who have the world at their feet get their kicks from playing a twelve-hour game of hunt, hide and seek with people from the margins of society. Their next target is Sean Macdonald (Pearson) a parentless teenager who lives with his sister on a housing estate on the outskirts of Edinburgh.

She's in debt, he's going nowhere fast. Sean agrees to play for cash. He soon realises he's walked into twelve hours of hell where survival is the name of the game.

== Theme song ==
The theme song "New Town Killers" marked Richard Jobson's first official return to songwriting in over fifteen years. The song was co written with Scottish group Isa & the Filthy Tongues who include former members of Goodbye Mr Mackenzie and Angelfish. Jobson contributed the lyrics and the band created the music. The backing music for this song was also used as the introductory score for the film.

Jobson helped the band perform this song at the Edinburgh film festival launch of the movie in June 2009 at Edinburgh's Voodoo Rooms.

== Cast ==
- Dougray Scott as Alistair Raskolnikov
- James Anthony Pearson as Sean Macdonald
- Alastair Mackenzie as Jamie Stewart
- Charles Mnene as Sam
- Shelley Conn as Julie Stewart
- Liz White as Alice Kelly
- Karen Gillan (in her first film role) as Young Girl in Bus Station
