= Grahame Dangerfield =

British naturalist, author, and broadcaster

- Born: 1938
- Died: July 13, 2018 (aged 79–80); Kenya
- Occupations: Naturalist, author, broadcaster
- Years active: 1960s–2018
- Employer(s): BBC; Independent television
- Known for: Wildlife conservation and broadcasting
- Notable work: The Unintended Zoo (1965); The Rajah of Bong and Other Owls (1981)
- Television: Badger's Bend; Five O'Clock Club; Boom!

Grahame Dangerfield (1938 – 13 July 2018) was a British naturalist, author and broadcaster. In the 1960s he was one of the first British television naturalists, and was largely involved with rescued British wildlife.

Dangerfield worked for both the BBC and independent television as a wildlife presenter and adviser, appearing in the programmes Badger's Bend, Five O'Clock Club and Boom!

In 1965 he left Britain to work in the Serengeti National Park in Tanzania. In the 1970s, he opened a private zoo at Wheathampstead.

Dangerfield was the author of a number of books about nature, including The Unintended Zoo (1965) and The Rajah of Bong and Other Owls (1981).

He lived in Kenya in later life. He died on 13 July 2018 at the age of 80.
