= Simon Tait =

British sailor

Personal information
- Nationality: British
- Born: 31 October 1932 (age 92)

Sport
- Sport: Sailing

Achievements and titles
- Olympic finals: 1972 Summer Olympics

Simon Tait (born 31 October 1932) is a British sailor who competed in the 1972 Summer Olympics.
