= Eilidh Loan =

Scottish actress

Eilidh Loan (born c. 1997) is a Scottish actor, writer and director. She is best known for her plays Moorcroft and Cathy.

== Career ==
Originally from Erskine she attended Guildford School of Acting, graduating in 2018.The following yearshe played Mary Shelley in Rona Munro's version of Frankenstein.

In 2022, she wrote her first play Moorcroft, an acclaimed play about a football team, based on her father's experience. The play was published by Methuen Drama in 2023. Loan subsequently wrote and directed the short film Soul, based around Northern Soul and her experiences of joining her dad on the dancefloor. It was produced as part of Screen Scotland's Sharp Shorts scheme. She also wrote and directed Cathy, a 2026 play performed at the Edinburgh Festival Fringe, based on her grandmother.

Her stage credits include Me & My Left Ball (2019), Mary & Ada Set the World To Rights (2021), Me and My Sister Tell Each Other Everything (2022), Macbeth (2023), and Antigone at the Tron Theatre.

Her screen credits include A Castle for Christmas, Traces, The Sister Boniface Mysteries, Pancake, Clique, Doctors, England's Forgotten Queen: The Life and Death of Lady Jane Grey, London Kills, How to Have Sex. and Doctor Who.
