= Peter Dangerfield =

Clinical anatomist

Peter Dangerfield FHEA is a clinical anatomist at the University of Liverpool and a professor at Staffordshire University.

== Biography ==
Dangerfield is a member of the British Medical Association (BMA) UK Council and co-chair of the Medical Academic Staff Committee. He is a past chair of the former Board of Medical Education and has made frequent contributions to meetings of the Association for the Study of Medical Education (ASME).

He is an examiner for the Court of Examiners at the Royal College of Surgeons of England, former president of the Liverpool Medical Institution, treasurer of the British Association of Clinical Anatomists and a fellow of the British Medical Association.

Dangerfield is associate editor of the journal Scoliosis. He is a past secretary and honorary member of The International Research Society of Spinal Deformities (IRSSD). In 2008 he was awarded the Nobel Medal by the IRSSD.

Both during and after the Alder Hey organs scandal (1999–2001), Dangerfield came to public prominence, as a media commentator. Already known for his work with the BMA, his opinion was sought on various topics regarding anatomy. Notably, Gunther von Hagens', Body Worlds exhibition in 2002.

In 2011 he was presented with honorary life membership of the Royal Liverpool Philharmonic Society for his commitment and contribution as chairman of the Rodewald Concert Society.

== Publications ==
Dangerfield's research interests include paediatric skeletal conditions, aetiology and pathogenesis of spinal deformity, Perthes' disease and normal growth and development. His publications include:

- David Sinclair and Peter Dangerfield (1998). Human Growth after Birth (6th ed.). Oxford University Press. ISBN 0192629050.
- Dirk Uyttendaele and Peter Dangerfield, ed. (2006). Research into Spinal Deformities 5. IOS Press. ISBN 1586036300.
- Peter Dangerfield, ed. (2008). Research into Spinal Deformities 6. IOS Press. ISBN 978-1586038885.
