= James Anthony Pearson =

British actor

James Anthony Pearson is a British actor who lives in Glasgow.

Pearson is best known for his performance as Bernard Sumner in Anton Corbijn's film Control. He played the role of Angus Stewart in 5th series of BBC's Monarch of the Glen. He also stars in the 2009 British film New Town Killers, an action thriller for which Pearson performed most of his own stunts. Pearson first appeared on TV in the BAFTA Award-winning BBC TV series Jeopardy playing the central role of Simon. It ran for three series, with a total of 40 episodes. He also starred as Ed MacKenzie in the BBC Three drama Lip Service. He starred as Davie Balfour for BBC Adaption of Kidnapped in 2005.

He stars in the music video for "Come Monday Night", the first single from Stuart Murdoch's project God Help the Girl.

== Radio ==
Date	Title	Role	Director	Station
14 March 2008	Things to Do before You Die	David	Lu Kemp	BBC Radio 4 Afternoon Play
26 March 2009	Gondwanaland	Hubert	Kirsty Williams	BBC Radio 4 Afternoon Play
6 September 2010	The Cracks	Michael	Kirsty Williams	BBC Radio 4 Afternoon Play
28 September 2010	The Greengrocer's Apostrophe: Penny's from Heaven	Reader	Eilidh McCreadie	BBC Radio 4 Afternoon Reading
