= John Byrne (playwright) =

Scottish playwright and artist (1940–2023)

- Born: John Patrick Byrne; 6 January 1940; Paisley, Renfrewshire, Scotland
- Died: 30 November 2023 (aged 83); Edinburgh, Scotland
- Education: Glasgow School of Art
- Spouses: Alice Simpson (m. 1964; div. 2014) Jeanine Davies (m. 2014)
- Partner: Tilda Swinton (1989–2003)
- Children: 4, including Honor
- Writing career
- Notable works: The Slab Boys Trilogy; Tutti Frutti; Your Cheatin Heart

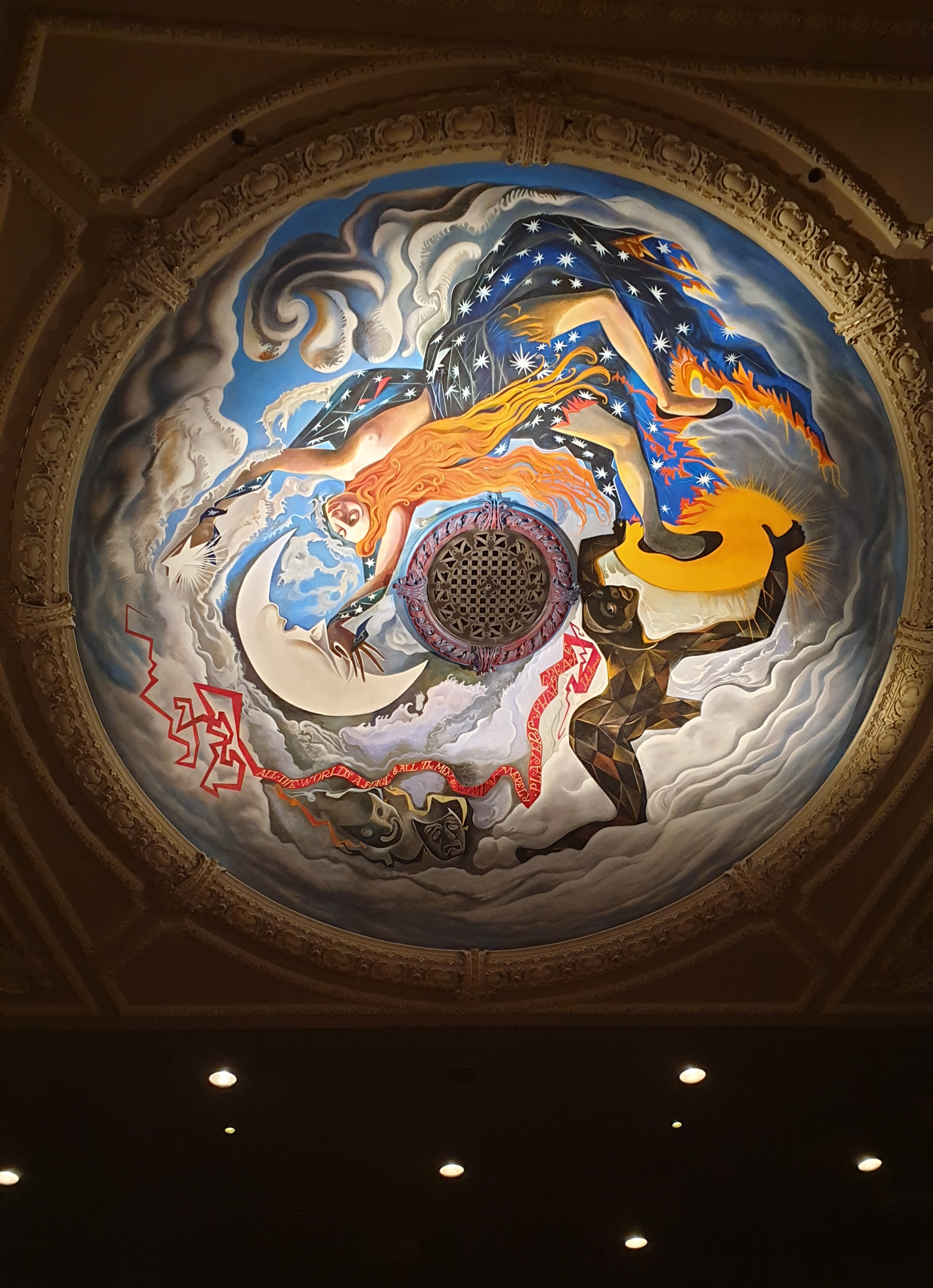
2013 painted ceiling in the King's Theatre, Edinburgh

John Patrick Byrne (6 January 1940 – 30 November 2023) was a Scottish playwright, screenwriter, artist and designer. He wrote The Slab Boys Trilogy, plays which explore working-class life in Scotland, and the TV dramas Tutti Frutti and Your Cheatin' Heart. Byrne was also a painter, printmaker and scenic designer.

== Early life and education ==
John Patrick Byrne was born into a family of Irish Catholic descent in Paisley, Renfrewshire, and he grew up in the Ferguslie Park housing scheme. His mother, Alice McShane, was married to Patrick Byrne when he was born. He was, however, conceived from an incestuous affair between his mother and her father, Patrick McShane. He did not know the truth about his parentage until he was informed by his cousin in 2002. He was initially angered by the revelation, but eventually reconciled with the truth of his lineage: "I think he gave me that wonderful mixture of genes with his own daughter, the eldest of the family. I presume it's what they do in unlettered places and lettered places. It's traditional, and nobody speaks about it." His mother was diagnosed with schizophrenia, which Byrne attributed to the incestuous relationship. She was hospitalized several times throughout her life before dying in Dykebar Hospital at the age of 74.

Byrne was educated at St Mirin's Academy in Paisley, and then attended Glasgow School of Art, from which he graduated in 1963. Prior to art school, he worked as a "slab boy" at Stoddard's carpet factory in Elderslie near Paisley, where he mixed paint used in the manufacture of carpets. He later returned as a designer following his graduation from art school. His time there inspired his The Slab Boys Trilogy plays.

== Career ==
=== Art ===
Much of Byrne's art was portraits, in a wide variety of styles ranging from fairly conventional oils to what are effectively caricatures. The full stylistic range was applied to his many self-portraits; the 2022 retrospective included 42 of these, and many are among his best known works. Other recurring themes include music; he painted several guitars for musician friends.

At the start of his career, in an attempt to break in to the London art world, he sent one of his works to the Portal Gallery, claiming it was by his father Patrick Byrne, simply signed "Patrick". A cover letter detailed his father's hard, lonely life, and claimed that there were another 50 works by him at his small house in Dunoon. The hoax was found out, but the exhibition attracted some attention – in particular from the Beatles, who approached him to design the cover of their self-titled 1968 album. They decided against using his work, but it was subsequently used for the 1980 compilation The Beatles Ballads. Up until his death, he frequently signed his works with the name Patrick, most notably, "The American Boy", completed in 1971.

He started work in the theatre in 1972, working on Billy Connolly's The Great Northern Welly Boot Show and then as a house designer for the 7:84 Scotland theatre company.

From 1964 until 1966 Byrne designed jackets for Penguin Books. Having had his work rejected by various galleries, Byrne had success following an exhibition of works at London's Portal Gallery in 1967. Painting under the pseudonym of "Patrick", Byrne claimed the dream-like paintings were created by his father, an alleged self-taught painter of faux-naïf images. Byrne's career as a professional painter started in 1968, when he left Stoddard's.

As well as designing the scenery for his own plays Byrne, in collaboration with director Robin Lefevre, also designed the settings for Snoo Wilson's The Number of the Beast (Bush 1982) and Clifford Odets' The Country Girl (Apollo Theatre 1983).

Some of Byrne's best-known art works in their day were the album covers he created for friend Gerry Rafferty and his former bands the Humblebums and Stealers Wheel, among them the covers for City to City and Night Owl. Rafferty's early song "Patrick" is about Byrne.

Byrne had an unsuccessful exhibition of his artistic work in 1975 and subsequently kept his work from public view. He began exhibiting again in 1991, with several subsequent exhibitions. He became a member of the Royal Scottish Academy in 2007.

He illustrated Selected Stories by James Kelman, winner of the 1994 Booker Prize. Several of his paintings hang in the Scottish National Portrait Gallery in Edinburgh, including portraits of Robbie Coltrane, Billy Connolly, Tilda Swinton (the mother of two of his children), and a self-portrait.

He received a number of museum retrospective exhibitions, including "John Byrne at 60, The Unsolved Artist", 2000, Paisley, Renfrewshire, "Sitting Ducks", 2014, Scottish National Portrait Gallery, Edinburgh, "Ceci n'est pas une rétrospective", 2022, Fine Art Society, Edinburgh, and "John Byrne: A Big Adventure", 2022, Kelvingrove Art Gallery and Museum, Glasgow.

=== Writing ===
In the 1970s Byrne started writing his own work; Writer's Cramp was a success at the Edinburgh Fringe Festival in 1977 before transferring to London.

The following year he wrote The Slab Boys, the first part of a trilogy of plays which premiered between 1978 and 1982 at the Traverse Theatre Club, Edinburgh. A fourth part was added in 2008. The main characters in the first part, The Slab Boys, generally the most popular, are working-class Glaswegian teenagers, and the play launched the careers of several young actors: Robbie Coltrane in Edinburgh, and in the 1983 Broadway production, Kevin Bacon, Sean Penn, Val Kilmer and Jackie Earle Haley.

His writing found much success in the 1987 BBC television series Tutti Frutti, starring Robbie Coltrane, Emma Thompson and Maurice Roeves, which chronicled the final days of a failing rock 'n' roll band. The series received much critical acclaim, including winning six BAFTA awards, the one for Graphic design naming Byrne himself.

He followed this in 1990 with Your Cheatin' Heart, a six-part series set in the Glasgow country music scene, starring John Gordon Sinclair, Ken Stott and Tilda Swinton.

Byrne created The John Byrne Awards.

== Works ==
=== Television ===
Year	Title	Notes
1979	Play for Today	TV version of The Slab Boys
1986	Scotch and Wry	Video
1987	Double Scotch & Wry	Video
1987	Crown Court	Episode: "Big Deal, Part One"
1987	Tutti Frutti	BAFTA award-winning series for BBC Television
1988	The Play on One	Normal Service
1990	Your Cheatin' Heart	
1993	ScreenPlay	Boswell and Johnson's Tour of the Western Isles

=== Theatre ===
Year	Title	Notes
1978	The Slab Boys	
1979	The Loveliest Night of the Year	subsequently rewritten as Cuttin' a Rug.
1979	Normal Service	
1980	Babes in the Wood	Pantomime.
1981	Cara Coco	
1984	Candy Kisses	Premiered Leicester Haymarket Theatre October 1984
1992	Colquhoun and MacBryde	
1997	The Government Inspector	
2004	Uncle Varick	Adaptation of Anton Chekhov play Uncle Vanya
2006	Tutti Frutti	Stage adaptation for the National Theatre of Scotland, co-produced by His Majesty's Theatre, Aberdeen
2008	Nova Scotia	
2010	The Cherry Orchard	Adaptation of Chekhov play
2014	Three Sisters	Adaptation of Chekhov play
2022	Underwood Lane	

=== Radio ===
Year	Title	Notes
1977	Writer's Cramp	

== Personal life ==
Byrne was married to Alice Simpson, whom he met in art school, from 1964 until their divorce in 2014. They had a son and a daughter together. During the filming of Your Cheatin' Heart, Byrne began a relationship with Tilda Swinton. They lived together in London and later in Nairn, northern Scotland. Swinton gave birth to twins, a boy, Xavier and girl, Honor Swinton Byrne, in 1997. They separated in 2003. He began a relationship with the theatre lighting designer Jeanine Davies in 2006, marrying her in 2014.

== Death ==
Byrne died on 30 November 2023, at the age of 83.

== Honours ==
- 24 June 2015 – Honorary degree of Doctor of the University (DUniv), University of Stirling
- 2022 – Freedom of Renfrewshire

== Sources ==
- Reid, Gordon, "The Return of the Big Adventurer to Glasgow's Kelvingrove", review of the 2022 exhibition, art mag.

Reviews

- Ross, Raymond J. (1983), Directed Irony, which includes a review of The Slab Boys, in Hearn, Sheila G. (ed.), Cencrastus No. 11, New Year 1983, pp. 45 & 46, ISSN 0264-0856
