= List of HolbyBlue episodes =

The cover of the DVD for the first series of HolbyBlue

HolbyBlue is a British police procedural drama which was created by Tony Jordan. The show is set in the fictional city of Holby, and focuses on the daily lives of police officers working at Holby South police station. The show's ensemble cast for series one consisted of Jimmy Akingbola, Joe Jacobs, David Sterne, Cal MacAninch, James Hillier, Kacey Ainsworth, Richard Harrington, Zöe Lucker, Chloe Howman, Kieran O'Brien, Tim Pigott-Smith and Elaine Glover. Pigott-Smith departed the drama in the final episode of the first series at the conclusion of his character's storyline. Actors Oliver Milburn and James Thornton joined the drama for series two.

The creation of HolbyBlue was announced on 27 April 2006 by the BBC. It was revealed that the show would have links to British medical drama Holby City. Tony Jordan was recruited to write scripts for the show and work out "how storylines between the police station and the hospital could be intertwined." The first series began filming at the end of January 2007, commenced airing on 8 May 2007 at 8 pm, one week later than scheduled for unknown reasons, and concluded on 26 June 2007. On 21 June 2007, it was announced that HolbyBlue would air a second series in 2008, this time for an extended run of twelve episodes. Filming recommenced in late 2007 in Surrey, and the second series began airing on 20 March 2008, concluding on 5 June 2008. Two series of HolbyBlue aired in total.

On 6 August 2008, the BBC revealed that HolbyBlue would not be recommissioned for a third series, due to a decline in viewership. The second series started with 5.6 million viewers, but by the end of May had fallen to 2.5 million. Upon the cancellation of the show, Red Planet Picture's drama executive Claire Phillips stated that "HolbyBlue set new standards for 8 pm dramas, in terms of production values, storytelling and casting." At the 2007 and 2008 Inside Soap Awards, HolbyBlue was nominated under the Best Drama category. Ainsworth and Lucker both received nominations for Best Actress at the TV Quick & TV Choice Awards in 2007, while HolbyBlue was nominated under the Best New Drama Series category. Akingbola was put forward for Best Male Performance in TV at the 2008 Screen Nation Awards.

== Series overview ==
Series	Episodes	Originally released	
Series	Episodes	First released	Last released
1	8	8 May 2007	26 June 2007
2	12	20 March 2008	5 June 2008

== Series 1 (2007) ==
No.	Title	Directed by	Written by	Original release date	UK viewers (millions)
1	"Episode 1"	Martin Hutchings	Tony Jordan	8 May 2007	5.46
Detective sergeant Luke French begins his first shift at Holby South police station. Luke is surprised by his mentor, detective inspector John Keenan, who uses unorthodox methods to help him catch criminals. The team investigate a suspected paedophile and child molester who has been released on bail following a lack of evidence to bring the case to trial. However, when new police officer Lucy Slater discovers a new piece of evidence which proves the paedophile's involvement in his crime, she makes her first arrest, and is delighted. John is devastated upon learning his estranged wife, Kate Keenan, has a new boyfriend. He has sex with Rachel, who works for the Crown Prosecution Service.
2	"Episode 2"	Martin Hutchings	Tony Jordan	15 May 2007	5.16
Kate is offered a job as a receptionist at the police station, and she accepts. John becomes confused by Kate when she begins flirting with him. He decides he is ready for a reconciliation, but then Rachel reveals that she has been having sex with John. Whilst on shift, John learns that PC William Jackson has been approached by Louise, who is John's enemy, drug baron Neculai Stenga's girlfriend. John has been determined to arrest Neculai, but never found enough evidence to. Louise reveals she is ready to testify against Neculai after believing he is responsible for the death of a prostitute.
3	"Episode 3"	Bryn Higgins	James Payne	22 May 2007	4.42
John learns that there is an informant within the police station when an attempt to catch Neculai in a drugs raid goes wrong; he is unaware that the informant is Harry Hutchinson. Lucy and Mac tend to a delicate situation when an agitated man in custody holds the pair hostage. Lucy and Mac work together to try to calm the man; although it results in Lucy being stabbed. Kelly finds herself in a moral dilemma when she finds a large sum of money. She initially steals £200, although later gives it back when her conscience gets the better of her. Luke and Mandy learn that their second attempt at IVF has failed; they are both heartbroken. Luke later gets a call from his terminally ill mother, which strains his and Mandy's relationship as he is forced to divide his priorities between his relationship and caring for his mother. Rachel continues make a point over her and John's one-night stand.
4	"Episode 4"	Bryn Higgins	Sarah Phelps	29 May 2007	—
Harry finds himself trapped when he realises that if he fails to follow Neculai's demands he could risk his retirement going to plan. Neculai requests that Harry finds out which safe house Louise is staying at, and he does. Neculai then has a thug who ran over Louise murdered. John finds himself questioning William when he spots him hanging out with Louise and her brother. Kate tells John that his obsession in trying to track Neculai down is causing him to isolate himself from his peers. Robert finds himself in an uncomfortable situation when Neil and Kelly arrest a burglar, whose sister turns out to be one of Robert's ex-girlfriends, of which he is the father to her child.
5	"Episode 5"	Barnaby Southcombe	Jeff Povey	5 June 2007	4.10 (overnight)
Louise flees the safe house after Neculai visits her. John begins to believe that Neculai is gaining information from a police officer who is working at the police station, and confides in Harry about his suspicions. Harry uses John's worries to his advantage, as he scapegoats William, who is arrested and put in a cell. Lucy is released from hospital following her stabbing. Jenny's husband, Alex, is called into the police station for questioning by Luke after a number of raids on a suspected paedophile ring. It is later revealed that it is Jenny who is having an affair when Luke watches video footage from Alex. Alex is heartbroken when he learns Jenny has no intentions of ending her affair. Jenny ends their marriage. Kate continues to be antagonised by Rachel.
6	"Episode 6"	Barnaby Southcombe	Richard Davidson	12 June 2007	4.00 (overnight)
Lucy delights in finding herself a new boyfriend, but Robert recognises him as a drug dealer, and forces the pair to separate. Lucy and Robert also find a witness which proves William is not the informant. William is disgusted by his arrest, and hands in his resignation. Neil is thrilled upon learning he has been promoted to the criminal investigation department, although his happiness is short-lived when he learns that his promotion was political as opposed to merit-based. Luke makes amends with Mandy and ultimately decides to place his mother in a care home. Robert grows close with a woman involved in a suspected racist attack, but Luke and John realise he is in danger, and rescue him.
7	"Episode 7"	Martin Hutchings	Marc Pye	19 June 2007	4.13
Luke is grief-stricken when he learns that his mother has died following a fall in the care home. He seeks support in Mandy, which brings the pair closer together. William decides to return to work following his resignation, and decides to remain at the police station. Robert recovers in hospital after having boiling water poured on his genitals by a murder suspect. Harry learns that Neculai is receiving a big shipment of drugs. John discovers that Harry is the informant after catching him leave the warehouse. Rachel provokes Kate into hitting her by stealing a letter from Jenny's mailbox. Kate tenders her resignation, but has her mind changed by John.
8	"Episode 8"	Martin Hutchings	Tony Jordan	26 June 2007	4.36
John confronts Harry over his deception at the police station. Harry realises he has to save himself; he offers John and Luke indisputable evidence on Neculai in an attempt to secure his freedom. Neculai realises he has been deceived by Harry, and holds Kate and her children hostage. John and Luke rush to the warehouse and desperately attempt to talk Neculai out of killing his family, which results in John and Luke being shot, and Neculai being killed. John and Luke survive their injuries, and John decides he is happy with Kate, although he continues to put his work life before his family. Luke is ecstatic to learn that Mandy is pregnant. At Harry's retirement party, Kelly and Neil almost share a kiss, while Harry is arrested.

== Series 2 (2008) ==
No.	Title	Directed by	Written by	Original release date	UK viewers (millions)
9	"Episode 1"	Sarah O'Gorman	Tony Jordan	20 March 2008	5.62
John and Luke find themselves questioning Holby City's registrar Jac Naylor on suspicion of the murder of serial rapist Alan Clooney. Luke has little success in pressuring Jac to confess to the murder, as she is adamant she is not responsible. The pair find themselves in a losing battle as Jac continues to fight her innocence. When a young girl who has been badly attacked is brought into the station for questioning, she reveals she was also a victim of Alan Clooney, and stabbed him with Jac's scissors in self defence. Jac is released following the young girl's revelation. Luke becomes a father for the first time. DCI Scott Vaughan begins his first shift at Holby South as Harry's replacement. Kate is surprised upon realising that Scott is the same man that she flirted with at a party the previous evening. Jenny learns she is pregnant.
10	"Episode 2"	Sarah O'Gorman	Ben Vanstone	27 March 2008	4.43
Scott receives a call informing him that three students have been found dead. John and Luke rush into action and work together in an attempt to get the batch of drugs off the street. Lucy and Robert investigate when a neighbour calls them out over concerns for the welfare of a baby. The case makes Robert realise that he wants to be a part of his estranged son's life again, and with support from Lucy, Robert attempts to make amends with his son and ex-girlfriend. Rachel grows tired of Christian's wayward policing behaviour. She makes a complaint, without him knowing.
11	"Episode 3"	Toby Haynes	Jeff Povey	3 April 2008	3.80 (overnight)
Jenny conducts an investigation into the complaint made against Christian. She soon learns that it was Rachel who made the complaint, and berates her. Robert is delighted when he manages to convince his ex-girlfriend that he has changed, and wants to build on his relationship with his son. He is told that he can see his son at the end of his shift. Robert and Lucy are called out to inform a teenager that his brother has fallen to his death during a police chase with William. The teenager does not take the news well, and it results in Robert being fatally shot. Lucy is heartbroken. Kelly returns from her training course, but tension continues to linger between her and Neil.
12	"Episode 4"	Toby Haynes	Debbie O'Malley	10 April 2008	3.50 (overnight)
Lucy struggles to cope with her emotions in the aftermath of Robert's death. She becomes determined to prevent another one of her colleagues from dying, and does whatever it takes to catch a teenage joyrider in a stolen vehicle. After her shift, Lucy decides to resign. John and Luke work together to track down a gang responsible for an unprovoked attack on a young man. Jenny persuades Christian to continue working at the police station. Neil and Kelly deal with a domestic dispute between a man and his ex-girlfriend.
13	"Episode 5"	Martin Hutchings	Sarah Phelps	17 April 2008	3.40 (overnight)
Mac visits Lucy at her family home in Yorkshire and convinces her to return to policing. Neil tells Kelly that he is in love with someone, but Kelly is unaware that she is the person he is on about. Scott removes John from a domestic violence case when he uses pressure to try to get the victim to speak up. This irritates John, who takes his frustration out on Kate. Scott senses friction between the couple, and suggests to Kate that she is transferred to another police station in order to save their marriage. Kate is furious at Scott's recommendation, and threatens him with a tribunal if he tries to remove her from the station. John decides to visit his father in prison.
14	"Episode 6"	Martin Hutchings	Sarah Phelps	24 April 2008	3.60 (overnight)
John's visit with his father in prison does not go to plan. Before John is able to leave, his father presents him with pictures of Kate and his children. John confronts Kate over his father's obtainment of the photos, to which Kate reveals she sent them to him in the post in the hopes that the pair would reconcile. John loses his temper with Kate, and she sees a new side to him when he almost hits her. Luke uses a new tactic to uncover more information from the ongoing domestic violence case, and ultimately helps the victim speak out about her abuse. Kelly is surprised when Neil reveals that he fancies her; she is then shocked when he tries to kiss her.
15	"Episode 7"	Jim Loach	Debbie O'Malley	1 May 2008	—
Lucy is partnered with new PC Jake Loughton for his first shift at Holby South. Lucy finds herself struggling to get along with Jake, having been paired up with him so soon after Robert's death. Lucy and Jake join John and Luke in helping to try to catch the burglars of a smash and grab robbery, which leads them to the missing case of a two-year-old. William is embarrassed when his estranged mother is brought into the police station after getting involved in a brawl outside a nightclub. Jenny, Kate and Mandy go out for a drink after their shift; they are surprised when they find Scott at the pub as well following a disastrous blind date. Kelly tells Neil that nothing will happen between them.
16	"Episode 8"	Jim Loach	Ben Vanstone	8 May 2008	3.20 (overnight)
Jake becomes defensive when Lucy questions him over his transfer to Holby South. After secretly investigating Jake's past, Lucy learns that Jake was demoted from sergeant. John tries to fix his relationship with Kate by sending her flowers. Jenny is horrified by a pregnancy scare, and immediately quits the police force. She informs Christian that he will be taking over at the station in the role of acting inspector. She then leaves, without saying goodbye to her colleagues. Kelly is happy that her and Neil's friendship is back on track. However, the pair's friendship is soon made awkward once more when Neil begins flirting with Kelly once again.
17	"Episode 9"	Menhaj Huda	Jake Riddell	15 May 2008	2.90 (overnight)
Christian starts his new role as acting inspector, and is quick to reassure his colleagues that he will not change. When Christian's friend, Miranda, arrives at the police station following a release from a drug rehabilitation clinic, he provides Miranda with support, as she informs him that she has received a job interview for a drugs referral worker. As Christian helps Miranda prepare for her interview, it becomes obvious that there is the potential for a relationship between the pair. John and Kate's relationship loses stability once more when he overhears Kate talking to Mandy about recent events between the pair. John and Luke investigate a vicious attack on a local drug dealer, while Kelly, Neil and William investigate a series of burglaries on an estate.
18	"Episode 10"	Menhaj Huda	Graham Mitchell	22 May 2008	2.80 (overnight)
Luke is heartbroken when Mandy dies unexpectedly following a roadside incident whilst she is out on duty. John desperately tries to mend his relationship with Kate once more, and pulls her into a room, before attempting to seduce her. Scott is angry upon learning what John has done whilst on duty. Lucy and Jake attend an incident at a bank, but are surprised when they find the branch manager has been shot. Christian and Miranda's relationship continues to strengthen.
19	"Episode 11"	Martin Hutchings	Simon Booker	29 May 2008	2.60 (overnight)
Luke receives support from his colleagues following Mandy's funeral. However, Luke is struggling when he leaves baby Ruby at Mandy's mother's house before work, and shows no intention of going back. Luke later realises he needs to take time off work, and returns home with Ruby. John's father is released from prison and John is informed that his father is the prime suspect in a new investigation, led by Luke, on a prostitute who has been assaulted. John returns home from his shift, and is shocked to find his father in his house. John kicks his father out, and learns that he was never actually a suspect in the prostitute case, and was actually playing mind games. Christian and Miranda go on their first date together.
20	"Episode 12"	Martin Hutchings	Tony Jordan	5 June 2008	—
Jake and Lucy are called out to a hoax call, where they end up in a snipers lair. Lucy learns that the sniper blames Jake for the accidental death of his son, but when she learns that Jake is not to blame, the pair find a way to talk the gunman around. It is Kelly's birthday, but she receives a nasty surprise whilst reviewing CCTV footage when she notices her husband cheating. Kelly ends her relationship with her husband, and seduces Neil in the locker room. Miranda finds a stash of drugs, but she resists temptation, and joins Christian at Kelly's birthday party. John and his father have a violent showdown at the top of a multi-storey carpark, which results in John's father almost dying. John later returns home, but is devastated when he learns that Kate has left him.
