= Gunpowder Plot in popular culture =

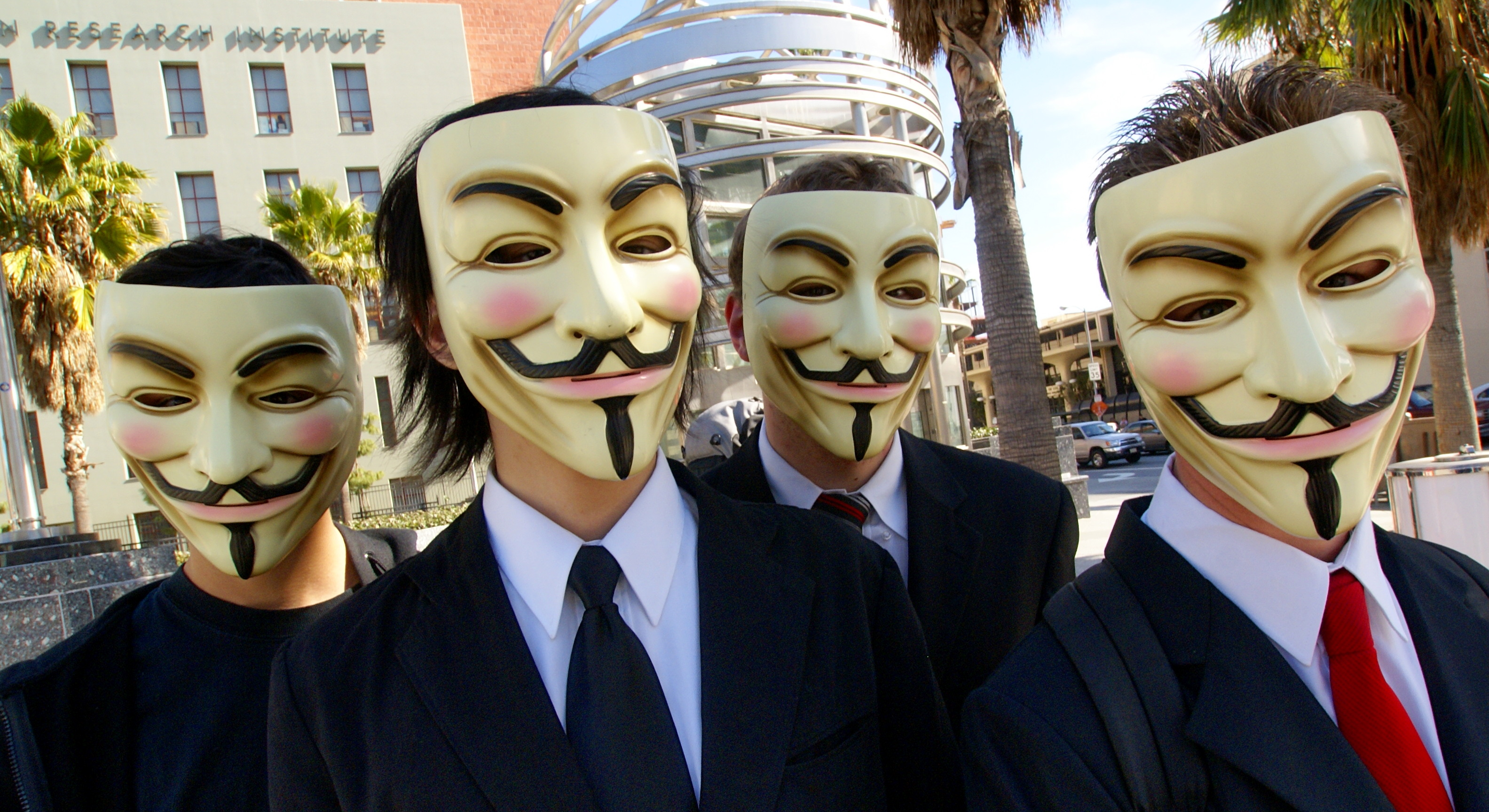
Anonymous with Guy Fawkes masks at the Scientology area in Los Angeles

The Gunpowder Plot was a failed assassination attempt against King James VI of Scotland and I of England by a group of provincial English Catholics led by Robert Catesby. The conspirators' aim was to blow up the House of Lords at the State Opening of Parliament on 5 November 1605, while the king and many other important members of the aristocracy and nobility were inside. The conspirator who became most closely associated with the plot in the popular imagination was Guy Fawkes, who had been assigned the task of lighting the fuse to the explosives.

== In literature ==
The young John Milton, in 1626 at the age of 17, wrote what one commentator has called a "critically vexing poem", In Quintum Novembris. The work reflects "partisan public sentiment on an English-Protestant national holiday", 5 November. In the published editions of 1645 and 1673, the poem is preceded by five epigrams on the subject of the Gunpowder Plot, apparently written by Milton in preparation for the larger work. Milton's imagination continued to be "haunted" by the Gunpowder Plot throughout his life, and critics have argued that it strongly influenced his later and more well-known poem, Paradise Lost.

William Harrison Ainsworth's 1841 historical romance Guy Fawkes; or, The Gunpowder Treason, portrays Fawkes in a generally sympathetic light, although it also embellishes the known facts for dramatic effect. Ainsworth's novel transformed Fawkes into an "acceptable fictional character", and Fawkes subsequently appeared in children's books and penny dreadfuls. One example of the latter is The Boyhood Days of Guy Fawkes, published in about 1905, which portrayed Fawkes as "essentially an action hero".

With the phrase "A penny for the Old Guy", Anglo-American poet T. S. Eliot acknowledges Fawkes (and the straw-man effigy burned every year on 5 November) in an epigraph to his 1925 poem "The Hollow Men".

The main character in the dystopian comic book series V for Vendetta (Moore/Lloyd) - which first began publication in 1982 and was completed in 1989 - wore a Guy Fawkes mask. (Note: [Writer Alan Moore quoting a handwritten note by Dave Lloyd] Why don't we portray him as a resurrected Guy Fawkes, complete with one of those papier-mâché masks, in a cape and a conical hat? He’d look really bizarre and it would give Guy Fawkes the image he's deserved all these years. We shouldn’t burn the chap every Nov. 5th but celebrate his attempt to blow up Parliament! [end of handwritten note] ... [due to Dave's idea] All of the various fragments in my head suddenly fell into place, united behind the single image of a Guy Fawkes mask.) In the comic, and in its 2005 film adaptation, "V" succeeds in blowing up the Houses of Parliament on 5 November (1997 in the comic, 2021 in the film). The film adaptation also opens with a dramatised depiction of Fawkes's arrest and execution, as the character Evey narrates the first lines of the poem of Guy Fawkes Night - which was also used in the trailer, as it was initially scheduled to debut on the November 4th, almost the precise 400th anniversary of the Gunpowder Plot itself. (However, the film was delayed either due to post-production work, or sensitivities surrounding the then-recent and thematically resonant London tube bombing on the 7 July).

In the Doctor Who Virgin Missing Adventures novel "The Plotters", the First Doctor and his companions Ian Chesterton, Barbara Wright and Vicki become involved with the Gunpowder Plot when the Doctor visits to investigate, learning that the plot was aided by a member of the king's court—who intended to expose the plot and thus impose more stringent anti-Catholic measures—and a brotherhood of self-styled warlocks who hoped that they would gain power in the ensuing chaos if the plot succeeded. During their investigation, Guy Fawkes is killed before 5 November while protecting Barbara after she tells him the truth about her presence, but a member of the court who was part of the brotherhood is tried as Fawkes, thus preserving history. The Eleventh Doctor, Amy Pond and Rory Williams also become involved in the Plot in the Doctor Who: The Adventure Games computer game, where the Plot was manipulated by rival aliens the Sontarans and the Rutans to recover a Rutan spaceship that had crash-landed underneath the location where Parliament would be built in the thirteenth century, as the ship contained weapons that could wipe out the Sontarans. Making contact with Fawkes and the others to confirm the plot's progress, the Doctor later manages to recover and alter one of the Rutan weapons hidden in the ship so it will instead wipe out the Rutans, then gives one weapon to each side, not telling them which is which, meaning that neither side can use them for risk of wiping out themselves. Before the TARDIS crew depart, the Doctor pays one last visit to Fawkes, and tells him that the world will remember what he did this day without revealing that he is destined to fail.

The children's novel Witch Week – the third novel of the Chrestomanci series – by Diana Wynne Jones takes place in a world very similar to our own, with the exception of the existence of magic. It takes place in a boarding school, where several students discover they're witches. Using magic is however punishable by death. In order to conceal their magic the kids get into a bunch of trouble. At their wits end, they call on extremely powerful enchanter Chrestomanci to help them out. Near the end of the story it is revealed that all of the events transpired because in their world, the Gunpowder Plot was successful. This caused their world to split off from ours, taking all the magic with it. The bombing is erased from history, thereby merging their world with ours and erasing both magic and all the troubling events that transpired.

In the Harry Potter series, Dumbledore, the school's headmaster, has a phoenix called Fawkes, named after Guy Fawkes. According to tradition, a phoenix burns when it reaches the end of its life.

In the novel Martin Chuzzlewit it is said that a member of the Chuzzlewit family was "unquestionably" involved in the Gunpowder Plot, and that Fawkes himself may indeed have been a scion of the family's "remarkable stock."

Two recent novels apply to the Gunpowder Plot the conventions of the modern Spy thriller, adapted to the 17th Century conditions. Both broadly stick to known historical facts, only slightly altering them to accommodate fictional characters, and creatively fill in many details which remain unknown in the official records of the Gunpowder Plot.

- In the later part of Ken Follett's 2017 novel A Column of Fire, the Gunpowder Plot is made the final round in a decades-long, deadly battle of wits between Catholic conspirator Rollo Fitzgerald, hatching sophisticated dangerous conspiracies, and Ned Willard, the Royal spymaster tasked with uncovering and foiling these conspiracies (and who happens to be Fitzgerald's brother-in-law). Follett attributes to Rollo Fitzgerald the role of initiating the plot and recruiting Guy Fawkes to implement it. To Ned Willard is attributed the role of uncovering the conspiracy and averting it at the last moment. For dramatic purposes, Follett omits the historical fact that the gunpowder had undergone some deterioration and might not have exploded. As depicted in the book, it was completely combustible and the plot might well have been carried out, with drastic results for later English history, but for Willard discovering it in the very nick of time.
- Christie Dickason's 2005 novel The Firemaster's Mistress focuses on Francis Quoynt, the "Firemaster" (gunpowder expert) who provided the conspirators with their multiple barrels of gunpowder. The identity of the person who actually did this remains unknown, as the Royal authorities never prosecuted him as an accomplice. Dickason provides a plausible explanation why they did not: as depicted in the book, Secretary of State Robert Cecil was aware of the plot from an early stage, recruited Quoynt as a (very reluctant) double agent, sternly instructed him to go on with producing the gunpowder and even paying his expenses – with the deliberate intention of letting the plot nearly succeed and then catching the conspirators red-handed, so as to bolster the position of the newly enthroned King James I, still widely regarded as a Scottish interloper, and of Cecil himself as the King's right-hand man. In this, Cecil proves eminently successful. However, the book posits another plot, hatched by Cecil's cousin and arch-rival Francis Bacon, who was also aware of the Gunpowder Plot. Bacon intended, after the plot had been uncovered and Royal vigilance relaxed, to assassinate King James and his son and heir Henry when they go hunting. Then, Bacon would produce a surprise Royal successor, get that successor on the throne with the help of Spanish troops smuggled into England – whereupon Bacon would emerge as the power behind the new throne. This second plot is very neatly foiled by the Firemaster Quoynt and his eponymous mistress. Since there was no conclusive evidence of Bacon's involvement, Cecil prefers to keep the whole affair secret. There is no historical evidence for any such second plot. However, both Bacon's hunger for power and his fondness for convoluted plots are well known historical facts.
- Though the reconstruction of the details of the Gunpowder Plot is very different in the two books, both of them attribute the writing of the Monteagle letter to the protagonist's love interest. In both books, this character is described as a staunchly Catholic woman, caught in a web of conflicting loyalties – faithful to her religion and fellow Catholics but in no way supportive of a plot to blow up Parliament and King.

== In theatre ==
By the 19th century, Fawkes and the Gunpowder Plot had begun to be used as the basis for pantomimes. One early example is Harlequin and Guy Fawkes: or, the 5th of November, which was performed at the Theatre Royal, Covent Garden, on 16 November 1835. After the Plot is discovered, Fawkes changes into Harlequin and Robert Catesby, the leader of the Plot, into Pantaloon, following which "pure pantomime begins". Fawkes also features in the pantomime Guy Fawkes, or a Match for a King, written by Albert Smith and William Hale and first performed in 1855. The opening scene shows an argument between Catesby and Fawkes over the fate of Lord Monteagle, the man who raised the alarm after receiving an anonymous letter warning him not to attend Parliament on 5 November 1605. Catesby wants to save his friend Monteagle, but Fawkes, who regards him as an enemy, wants him blown up with the rest of the aristocracy. The two fight, at first with "doubtful" swords and then with bladders, before Fawkes is "done". The remainder of the pantomime consists of clowns acting out various comic scenes unrelated to the Gunpowder Plot.

The play Guido Fawkes: or, the Prophetess of Ordsall Cave was based on early episodes of the serialised version of Ainsworth's 1841 novel. Performed at the Queen's Theatre, Manchester, in June 1840, it portrayed Fawkes as a "politically motivated sympathiser with the common people's cause". Ainsworth's novel was translated to film in the 1923 production of Guy Fawkes, directed by Maurice Elvey and starring Matheson Lang as Fawkes.

In August 2005, a play called 5/11 which (slightly inaccurately) explains the social and political climate up to, and including, the attempt to blow up Parliament was launched at the Chichester Festival Theatre. Its cast included Hugh Ross as Cecil, Stephen Noonan as Catesby and Alistair McGowan as King James. It received largely positive reviews, which noted its relevance to today's society and its ability to enlighten its audience. The name "5/11" used for the Gunpowder Plot is a deliberate reference to "9/11", a common name for the September 11 attacks

The Gunpowder Plot is the central motif in the 2009 play Equivocation written by Bill Cain, which explores the dangers of telling the truth in difficult times. It considers a scenario in which the British government commissions William Shakespeare to write a definitive history of the plot in the form of a play.

== In music ==
The anthem O Lord how joyful is the King by Thomas Weelkes was written shortly after the failed plot, probably in thankfulness for the king’s life being spared. Similarly Edmund Hooper's anthem Hearken ye Nations was written as a commemoration of the day. As William Hunt points out, "major and minor harmonies are hurled into dissonant collision in cadences that border occasionally on musical hysteria, to express both the horror and the relief of carnage narrowly avoided."

At the very end of the song "Remember" on his first solo album, John Lennon is heard saying the words, "Remember, remember the fifth of November", followed by the sound of an explosion.

Cyberpunk band Pitchshifter's Un-United Kingdom, a song heavily critical of the United Kingdom government, features the line "and we could [all/still] learn a thing or two from Guy Fawkes" just before the refrain.

"Blow It Up, Start Again" is an orchestral piece composed by Jonathan Newman, premiered by the Chicago Youth Symphony Orchestras in 2012. In his composer's notes, Newman references Guy Fawkes' attempt to blow up the House of Lords. Carolina Crown Drum and Bugle Corps utilised the piece in their 2018 production, "Beast".

"Guy Fawkes Vs Che Guevara" was released on YouTube by Epic Rap Battles of History on 4 May 2019. The video poses the revolutionaries against each other in a rap battle.

Treason, a new musical with music and lyrics by Ricky Allan is currently being developed for planned stage presentation in 2021. Recordings of some of the songs began to be issued in November 2020.

== On radio ==
On 5 November 1945, Basil Rathbone and Nigel Bruce starred as Sherlock Holmes and Dr. Watson in an episode of The New Adventures of Sherlock Holmes entitled "The Gunpowder Plot", in which their client James Stuart (who claims to be a descendant of King James I) is terrified that his cousin Guy Fawkenby is planning to kill him on Guy Fawkes Day by recreating the Gunpowder Plot of 1605. Their investigation does turn up many parallels to the original Gunpowder Plot, but takes a sudden and unexpected twist at the end. This episode is available for download on many sites.

On 1 November 1980, BBC Radio 4 broadcast Gunpowder Treason and Plot, written by A. J. Walton and directed by Margaret Etall and featuring Michael Spice as Guy Fawkes, Christopher Scott as Thomas Wintour, Anthony Hyde as Robert Catesby, Fraser Kerr as James I, Robert Lang as Walter Raleigh and John Moffatt as Robert Cecil.

On 6 November 2005, to mark the 400th anniversary of the plot, BBC Radio 3 broadcast The Gunpowder Plot written by Jonathan Davidson and directed by David Hunter, with David Calder as Cecil, Sean Arnold as Lord Popham, Cal Macaninch as King James I, John Henshaw as Father Henry Garnet, Hugh Dickson as Father Oldcorn and Helen Longworth as Anne Vaux.

In 2005, BBC Radio 4 presented a series of five 15-minute plays, each written by a different playwright, entitled Gunpowder Women. Each play dealt with a woman who was somehow connected with the events of the Gunpowder Plot of 1605. The plays are linked by the interrogation of Anne Vaux, cousin of conspirator Robert Catesby. The series was rebroadcast in November 2014 on BBC Radio 4 Extra:

1. "The Pilgrim" - written by Theresa Heskins, with Carolyn Pickles as Ann - Could Anne Vaux, cousin of the Gunpowder Plot conspirator Robert Catesby, be involved?
2. "The Mother" - written by Deborah Catesby (an actual descendant of conspirator Robert Catesby), with Tina Gray - Robert Catesby's mother is concerned about her son's plans. But could she be a conspirator too?
3. "The Sister" - written by Kate Shaw, with Suzanne Cave - Lord Monteagle is warned not to go to Parliament. Did his sister Mary send him the letter?
4. "The Princess" - written by Louise Ramsden, with Elizabeth Wofford - The plot has failed. Is the King's nine-year-old daughter now the target?
5. "The Wife" - written by Stephanie Dale, with Peter Meakin and Deborah McAndrew - Thomas Bates, the servant of conspirator Robert Catesby, faces execution and his wife is desperate to speak with him before he meets his fate.

On 5 November 2009, BBC Radio 4 broadcast a slightly historically inaccurate special Afternoon Drama about Fawkes and the Gunpowder Plot written by and starring the comedic group The Penny Dreadfuls, with Kevin Eldon as Fawkes. The special was repeated on BBC Radio 4 Extra on 6 November 2011.

== On film and television ==
The Gunpowder Plot is the central theme of the second part of Gunpowder, Treason & Plot, a 2004 TV miniseries, with Robert Carlyle as King James and Michael Fassbender as Guy Fawkes.

On 22 October 2014, BBC Two broadcast Gunpowder 5/11: The Greatest Terror Plot written/produced/directed by Adam Kemp. The story is a dramatisation, using the actual words of Thomas Wintour (Jamie Thomas King), Guy Fawkes and state interrogators, of the events from Wintour's recruitment of both Fawkes and his own brother to his capture on 8 November and of the final days of the conspirators after 5/11. The story uses "5/11" for the Gunpowder Plot in the same way "9/11" is used for the 11 September 2001 terrorist attacks.

The plot and the rhyme were referenced in the BBC Sherlock episode "The Empty Hearse" aired on 1 January 2014. Sherlock and Dr. Watson must stop a planned terrorist attack against the House of Lords on 5 November, where a late-night hearing on an anti-terrorist bill is being held. Watson is almost burned alive inside a giant bonfire.

In October/November 2017, the BBC broadcast the 3-part drama Gunpowder, starring Kit Harington as Robert Catesby and Tom Cullen as Fawkes. Mark Gatiss, Peter Mullan and Liv Tyler also starred.

In the 2015 television series Mr. Robot, the hacktivist group F-Society is represented by a mask reminiscent of the Guy Fawkes mask, likely as a reference to Anonymous.

The action from the animated series Carmen Sandiego, in the episode The Jolly Good Show Caper, happens during the 5th of November and they explain the history behind the date, associating Carmen with Guy Fawkes, as he was considered a villain or a hero depending on who was asked. Guy Fawkes Night plays a huge part in the episode, as it provokes chaos while the villains of the series, VILE, are running a heist.

== In video games ==
As part of the planned (although ultimately cancelled) second series of video games centred around Doctor Who, titled Doctor Who: The Adventure Games, a fictionalised version of the plot featured as a main element in the story titled, "The Gunpowder Plot". Within this version, the plotters are assisted by an alien race called the Rutans, who are seeking to destroy Parliament in order to both provide power to and free their ship, buried underneath the ground for thousands of years, providing forty barrels of Gunpowder to achieve this goal. A rival alien race, and sworn enemy of the Rutan Host, named The Sontarans, seek to prevent this from occurring due to the Rutan ship carrying a doomsday weapon designed to wipe out the Sontaran race. The game was developed with an Educational Market in mind, and as such includes many facts about Jacobean Life, The Plot and the Plotters themselves.

== In verse ==
Several traditional rhymes have accompanied the Guy Fawkes Night festivities. "God Save the King" can be replaced by "God save the Queen" depending on who is on the throne. "Remember, remember the Fifth of November" is listed as number 16916 in the Roud Folk Song Index.

Remember, remember the Fifth of November,
The Gunpowder Treason and Plot,
I know of no reason
Why the Gunpowder Treason
Should ever be forgot.
Guy Fawkes, Guy Fawkes, t'was his intent
To blow up the King and Parli'ment.
Three-score barrels of powder below,
Poor old England to overthrow;
By God's providence he was catch'd (or by God's mercy*)
With a dark lantern and burning match.
Holla boys, Holla boys, let the bells ring.
Holloa boys, holloa boys, God save the King!
And what should we do with him? Burn him!

In more common use the "bonfire cry" is occasionally altered with the last three lines (after "burning match") supplanted by the following;

A traitor to the Crown by his action,
No Parli'ment mercy from any faction,
His just end should'st be grim,
What should we do? Burn him!
Holler boys, holler boys, let the bells ring,
Holler boys, holler boys, God save the King!

Some of the Bonfire Societies in the town of Lewes use a second verse reflecting the struggle between Protestants and Roman Catholics. This was widely used, but due to its anti-Roman Catholic tone has fallen out of favour.

A penny loaf to feed the Pope
A farthing o' cheese to choke him.
A pint of beer to rinse it down.
A fagot of sticks to burn him.
Burn him in a tub of tar.
Burn him like a blazing star.
Burn his body from his head.
Then we'll say ol' Pope is dead.
Hip hip hoorah!
Hip hip hoorah hoorah!

A variant on the foregoing:

Remember, remember the fifth of November
Gunpowder, treason and plot.
I see no reason, why gunpowder treason
Should ever be forgot.

Remember, remember, the fifth of November,
Gunpowder, treason and plot!
A stick or a stake for King James' sake
Will you please to give us a fagot
If you can't give us one, we'll take two;
The better for us and the worse for you!

Another piece of popular doggerel:

Guy, guy, guy
Poke him in the eye,
Put him on the bonfire,
And there let him die

Or, today used frequently, instead of "Put him on the bonfire", "Hang him on a lamppost".

...and another variant, sung by children in Lancashire while begging "A Penny For The Guy":
Remember, remember the fifth of November
It's Gunpowder Plot, we never forgot
Put your hand in your pocket and pull out your purse
A ha'penny or a penny will do you no harm
Who's that knocking at the window?
Who's that knocking at the door?
It's little Mary Ann with a candle in her hand
And she's going down the cellar for some coal

The following is a South Lancashire song sung when knocking on doors asking for money to buy fireworks, or combustibles for a bonfire (known as "Cob-coaling"). There are many variations, this is a shorter one:

We come a Cob-coaling for Bonfire time,
Your coal and your money we hope to enjoy.
Fal-a-dee, fal-a-die, fal-a-diddly-i-do-day.
For down in yon' cellar there's an owd umberella
And up on yon' cornish there's an owd pepperpot.
Pepperpot! Pepperpot! Morning 'till night.
If you give us nowt, we'll steal nowt and bid you good night.
Up a ladder, down a wall, a cob o'coal would save us all.
If you don't have a penny a ha'penny will do.
If you don't have a ha'penny, then God bless you.
We knock at your knocker and ring at your bell
To see what you'll give us for singing so well.

From Calderdale: The Ryburn Valley Gunpowder Plot Nominy Song

Calderdale had a plentiful store of rhymes and nominies, or short pieces of doggerel. Many of them were common to Yorkshire generally, where Gunpowder Plot rhymes were numerous.

Here comes three jolly rovers, all in one row.
We're coming a cob-coiling for t' Bon Fire Plot.
Bon Fire Plot from morning till night !
If you'll give us owt, we'll steal nowt, but bid you goodnight.

Fol-a-dee, fol-a-die, fol-a-diddle-die-do-dum !
(Repeated after each verse.)

The next house we come to is a sailor you see.
He sails over the ocean and over the sea,
Sailing from England to France and to Spain,
And now he's returning to England again.

The next house we come to is an old tinker's shop,
And up in one rook there's an old pepper-box-
An old pepper-box from morning till night-
If you'll give us owt, we'll steal nowt, but bid you good-night.

== Guy Fawkes mask in protests ==
Since the release of the 2006 film V for Vendetta, set in a dystopian United Kingdom, the use of the "Guy Fawkes" mask that appears in the film has become widespread internationally among anti-establishment protest groups. The illustrator of the comic books on which the film was based, David Lloyd, has stated that the character V decided "to adopt the persona and mission of Guy Fawkes – our great historical revolutionary".

== Polls ==
The public ranked Fawkes 30th in the BBC's 100 Greatest Britons, and he was included in Bernard Ingham's list of the 50 greatest people from Yorkshire.

== See also ==
- Paul Staines, who writes the "Guido Fawkes" blog.
