= Luke Kempner =

English impressionist, comedian and actor (born 1987)

- Born: Luke Garrod Kempner; 5 June 1987 (age 39); Burstow, Surrey, England
- Education: Guildford School of Acting
- Occupations: Impressionist; comedian; actor
- Spouse: Alana MacFarlane (m. 2016)
- Children: 1
- Relatives: Sooz Kempner (sister)
- Website: https://www.lukekempner.com/

Luke Garrod Kempner (born 5 June 1987) is an English impressionist, comedian and actor. After appearing in various films and musicals, he established a career in comedy, developing his own stand-up comedy show, and has since appeared as an impressionist on numerous sketch shows including Newzoids (2016), Tracey Ullman's Show (2017), Murder in Successville (2017), Spitting Image (2020–2021), The Last Leg (2021) and Deep Fake Neighbour Wars (2023), as well as appearing regularly on Big Brother's Bit on the Side (2016–2018).

== Early and personal life ==
Luke Garrod Kempner was born on 5 June 1987 to Mark and Anna Kempner (née Schneider) in Smallfield, a settlement in Burstow, Surrey, England. He is the younger brother of comedian Sooz Kempner. Kempner attended Burstow Primary School and subsequently Oakwood School in Horley. He then went on to attend Reigate College and studied drama at the Guildford School of Acting. Kempner said he "[impersonated] the teachers all the way through [his] education."

Kempner married Alana MacFarlane in 2016 and they have a daughter, born in 2021.

== Career ==
After finishing drama school, Kempner began his career as an actor, portraying minor roles in the films Fathers of Girls (2009) and Fly Trap (2010) and appearing in musicals including Lift, Les Misérables, South Pacific and Avenue Q but said that he "always wanted to do [his] comedy professionally."

In 2012, he began posting videos of himself impersonating celebrities including Andy Murray and Tom Daley, however it wasn't until his comedy skit Downstairs at Downton, inspired by the characters of the ITV drama Downton Abbey, gained traction on social media and his career as a comedian and impressionist subsequently took off. He developed the online sketch into a one-man show titled The Only Way Is Downton, touring around the UK at venues including the Edinburgh Fringe Festival, and later developing an American version America's Got Downton that he performed in the United States.

In December 2015, Kempner fronted his own ITV2 sketch show Luke Kempner's Impression of 2015, which featured Kempner's various impersonations of celebrities. In 2016, he appeared in an episode of Drunk History and provided the voices for the ITV sketch show Newzoids, before joining Big Brother's Bit on the Side as a regular comedian and impressionsist, in which he impersonated the housemates throughout the series. In 2017, he appeared as various characters in Tracey Ullman's Show and Murder in Successville.

In 2019, he narrated the ITV2 dating series Singletown. In 2020, Kempner appeared as a contestant on the first series of Celebrity Karaoke Club, and finished in third place. Between 2020 and 2021, he provided the voices for the puppets on the revival series of Spitting Image and went on to star in the musical adaption. In 2021, he appeared as various characters in The Last Leg.

In 2022, Kempner toured his new show Macho Macho Man at the Edinburgh Fringe Festival, which was described as a "deep dive into the thorny issues of modern masculinity" and ranked four out of five stars by The Daily Telegraph. In 2023, Kempner impersonated various celebrities in the ITV2 comedy series Deep Fake Neighbour Wars, before it was announced he would be appearing in the West End production of Les Misérables as Thénardier. He later reprised the role in the 2025 World Arena Concert Tour of the show.

== Filmography ==
Year	Title	Role	Notes	Ref.
2009	Fathers of Girls	Simon	Film	"
2010	Fly Trap	Jack	Film	
2015	Luke Kempner's Impression of 2015	Various	Sketch show	
2016	Drunk History	Dr. William Beatty	1 episode	
2016	Newzoids	Various	1 episode	
2016–2018	Big Brother's Bit on the Side	Himself	Regular guest	
2016–2018	Celebrity Big Brother's Bit on the Side	Himself	Regular guest	
2017	Tracey Ullman's Show	Various	Sketch show	
2017	Episodes	TV writer	1 episode	
2017	Murder in Successville	Various	Sketch show	
2019	Singletown	Himself	Narrator	
2020–2021	Spitting Image	Various	Sketch show	
2020	Celebrity Karaoke Club	Himself	Contestant	
2021	The Last Leg	Various	One Episode	
2023	Deep Fake Neighbour Wars	Various	Sketch show	
2023	Pointless Celebrities	Himself	Contestant	
2026	Dragon Striker	TBA		
