= John Keenan =

John Keenan may refer to:

- John F. Keenan (1929–2024), United States federal judge in New York
- John Keenan (bishop) (born 1964), Bishop of Paisley, Scotland
- John Keenan (Gaelic footballer) (born 1942), Irish retired sportsperson
- John Keenan (Medal of Honor) (c. 1840–1906), United States Army soldier during the Indian Wars
- John D. Keenan (born 1965), member of the Massachusetts House of Representatives
- John F. Keenan (politician) (born 1964), member of the Massachusetts Senate
- John R. Keennan (1939–2015), baseball scout for the Los Angeles Dodgers club

== Others ==
- John Keenan (Holby Blue), fictional character in the British television series Holby Blue

== See also ==
- Jack Keenan (disambiguation)
