= Fathers of Girls =

- Directed by: Karl Howman; Ethem Cetintas
- Written by: Karl Howman; Ethem Cetintas
- Produced by: Riza Nur Pacalioglu
- Starring: Ray Winstone
- Cinematography: Digby Elliott
- Edited by: Ash Mills
- Music by: Stuart Roslyn
- Release date: November 2010
- Running time: 76 minutes
- Country: United Kingdom
- Language: English

Fathers of Girls is a 2010 British drama film written and directed by Karl Howman and Ethem Cetintas and starring Ray Winstone.

== Plot ==
Frank, a single father, spirals into grief after his only child Helen dies of a drug overdose while in college. As he uncovers aspects of her life, he learns that she is dating a much older man and using drugs.

== Cast ==
- Ray Winstone as Frank Horner
- Chloe Howman as Emma Salerno
- Lois Winstone as Helen Horner
- Glen Murphy as Tommy Salerno
- James Hillier as Ron
- Luke Kempner as Simon
- Roger Kitter as Ricky Libra
- Suzanna Cetintas as Helen Junior

== Release ==
The film was released on either November 18, 2010 or November 19, 2010.

== Reception ==
The film has a 0% rating on Rotten Tomatoes based on nine reviews. Peter Bradshaw of The Guardian praised Winstone's performance but criticized the film's 76 minute runtime and "undeveloped" plot. Charles Gant, writing for Variety, criticized the supporting cast and the film's "banal" conflicts, but praised Winstone and the technical aspects of the production. Tim Robey of The Daily Telegraph gave the film a mostly negative review, describing it as "creepy" and uninteresting. Philip Wilding of Empire awarded the film two stars out of five, writing that its "ambling style corrodes the continuity of the film, scenes languish, dialogue is drawn out and the dénouement is unsatisfying and flat." Dave Calhoun of Time Out also awarded the film two stars out of five, calling it a "lifeless" mystery and criticizing the plot, supporting cast, and "fruity dialogue".
