= The Hollow Men =

1925 poem by T. S. Eliot

- by T. S. Eliot
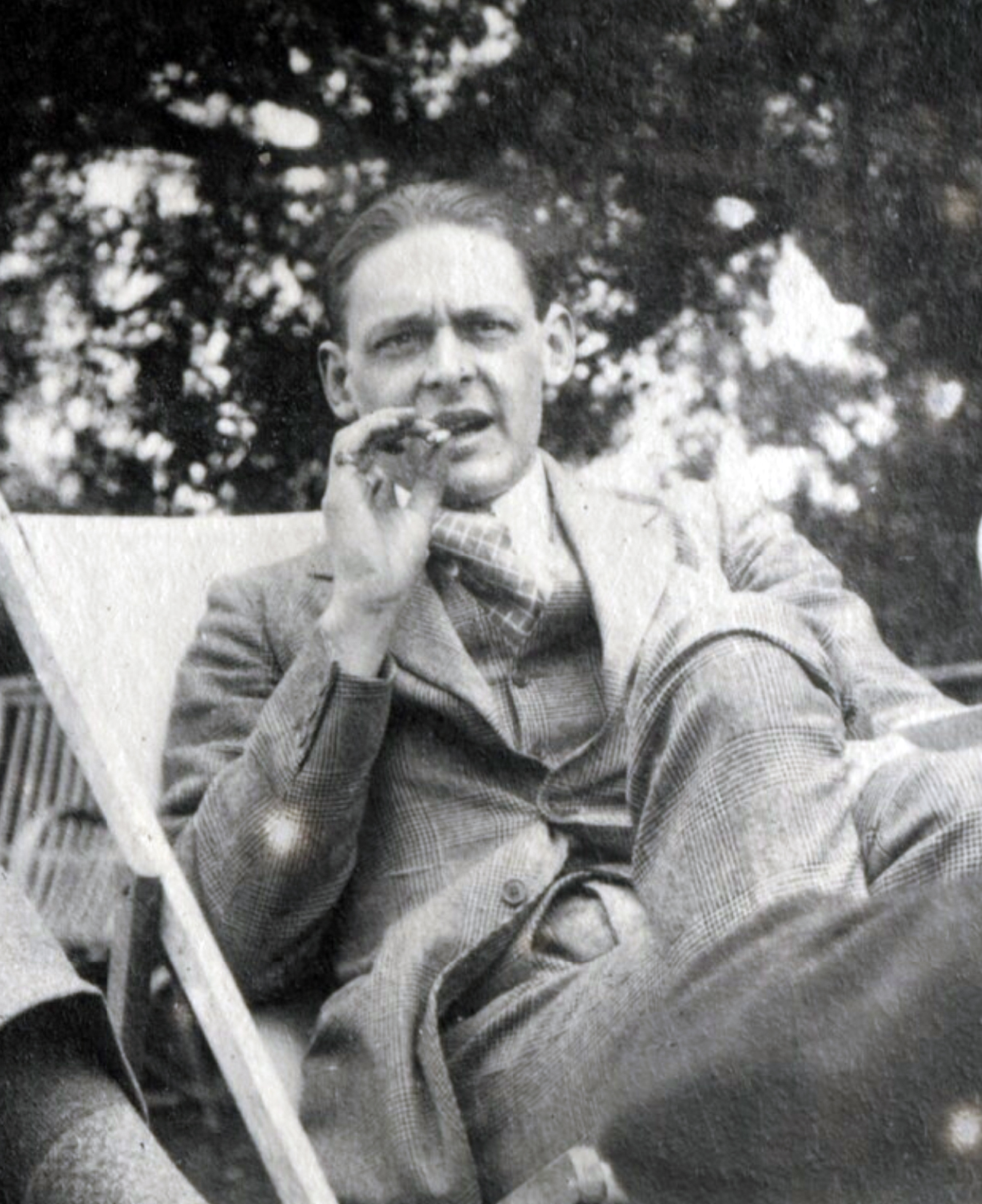
- Eliot in 1923
- Written: 1925
- Country: England
- Language: English
- Publisher: Faber & Faber
- Publication date: 1925
- Lines: 98
- Quote: This is the way the world ends This is the way the world ends This is the way the world ends Not with a bang but a whimper.

Full text
- The Hollow Men at Wikisource

"The Hollow Men" (1925) is a poem by the modernist writer T. S. Eliot. Like much of his work, its themes are overlapping and fragmentary, concerned with post–First World War Europe under the Treaty of Versailles, hopelessness, religious conversion, redemption and, some critics argue, his failing marriage with Vivienne Haigh-Wood Eliot. It was published two years before Eliot converted to Anglicanism.

Divided into five parts, the poem is 98 lines long. Eliot's New York Times obituary in 1965 identified the final four as "probably the most quoted lines of any 20th-century poet writing in English".

== Theme and context ==
Eliot wrote that he produced the title "The Hollow Men" by combining the titles of the romance The Hollow Land by William Morris with the poem "The Broken Men" by Rudyard Kipling; but it is possible that this is one of Eliot's many constructed allusions. The title could also be theorised to originate from Shakespeare's Julius Caesar or from the character Kurtz in Joseph Conrad's Heart of Darkness, who is referred to as a "hollow sham" and "hollow at the core". The latter is more likely since Kurtz is mentioned in one of the two epigraphs.

The two epigraphs to the poem, "Mistah Kurtz – he dead" and "A penny for the Old Guy", are allusions to Conrad's character and to Guy Fawkes. In the 1605 Gunpowder Plot, Fawkes attempted to blow up the English Parliament and his straw-man effigy (a 'Guy') is burned each year in the United Kingdom on Guy Fawkes Night (5 November). Certain quotes from the poem such as "headpiece filled with straw" and "in our dry cellar" seem to be references to the Gunpowder Plot.

The Hollow Men follows the otherworldly journey of the spiritually dead, metaphorically compared to scarecrows stuffed with straw. These "hollow men" have the realisation, humility, and acknowledgement of their guilt and their status as broken, lost souls. Their shame is seen in lines like "[...] eyes I dare not meet in dreams [...]" calling themselves "[...] sightless [...]" and that "[...] [death is] the only hope of empty men [...]". The "hollow men" fail to transform their motions into actions, conception to creation, desire to fulfillment. This awareness of the split between thought and action coupled with their awareness of "death's various kingdoms" and acute diagnosis of their hollowness, makes it hard for them to go forward and break through their spiritual sterility. Eliot invokes imagery from the Inferno, specifically the third and fourth cantos of the Inferno which describes Limbo, the first circle of Hell – showing man in his inability to cross into Hell itself or to even beg redemption, unable to speak with God. He states that the hollow men "[...] grope together and avoid speech, gathered on this beach of the tumid river [...]", and Dante states that at the Gates of Hell, people who did neither good nor evil in their lives have to gather quietly by a river where Charon cannot ferry them across. This is the punishment for those in Limbo according to Dante, people who "[...] lived without infamy or praise [...]" They did not put any good or evil into the world, making them out to be 'hollow' people who can only watch others move on into the afterlife. Eliot reprises this moment in his poem as the hollow men watch "[...] those who have crossed with direct eyes, to death's other kingdom [...]". Eliot describes how they wish to be seen "[...] not as lost/Violent souls, but only/As the hollow men/The stuffed men [...]".

As the poem enters section five, there is a complete breakdown of language. The Lord's Prayer and what appears to be a lyric change of "Here We Go Round the Mulberry Bush" are written until this devolution of style ends with the final stanza, maybe the most quoted of Eliot's poetry:

This is the way the world ends
This is the way the world ends
This is the way the world ends
Not with a bang but a whimper.

When asked in 1958 if he would write these lines again, Eliot said he would not. According to Henry Hewes: "One reason is that while the association of the H-bomb is irrelevant to it, it would today come to everyone's mind. Another is that he is not sure the world will end with either. People whose houses were bombed have told him they don't remember hearing anything."

== Publication information ==
The poem was first published as now known on 23 November 1925, in Eliot's Poems: 1909–1925. Eliot was known to collect poems and fragments of poems to produce new works. This is clear to see in his poems The Hollow Men and "Ash-Wednesday" where he incorporated previously published poems to become sections of a larger work. In the case of The Hollow Men four of the five sections of the poem were previously published:

- "Poème", published in the Winter 1924 edition of Commerce (with a French translation), became Part I of The Hollow Men.
- Doris's Dream Songs in the November 1924 issue of Chapbook had the three poems: "Eyes that last I saw in tears", "The wind sprang up at four o'clock", and "This is the dead land." The third poem became Part III of The Hollow Men.
- Three Eliot poems appeared in the January 1925 issue of his The Criterion magazine: "Eyes I dare not meet in dreams", "Eyes that I last saw in tears", and "The eyes are not here". The first poem became Part II of The Hollow Men and the third became Part IV.
- The March 1925 edition of The Dial published The Hollow Men, I-III which was finally transformed to The Hollow Men Parts I, II, and IV in Poems: 1909–1925.

== Influence in culture ==
The Hollow Men has had a profound effect on the Anglo-American cultural lexicon. An obituary for Eliot stated that the last four lines of the poem are "probably the most quoted lines of any 20th-century poet writing in English."

=== Film ===
- In Apocalypse Now, Colonel Kurtz (Marlon Brando) reads "The Hollow Men" to his followers, using it to explain shared spiritual and moral emptiness.
- The trailer for the film Southland Tales (2006), directed by Richard Kelly, references the poem, stating: "This is the way the world ends, not with a whimper but with a bang." The film also quotes this inverted version of the line a number of times, mostly in voice-overs.
- The poem is mentioned several times during the Apple TV+ film The Gorge (2025). The antagonists are called "Hollow Men" in direct reference to Eliot's poem.

=== Literature ===
- Louise Lawrence's novel, Children of the Dust (1985), references the last stanza of the poem, with a character quoting it when faced with the aftermath of a nuclear apocalypse.

=== Multimedia ===
- Chris Marker created a 19-minute multimedia piece for the Museum of Modern Art in New York City titled Owls At Noon Prelude: The Hollow Men (2005), which was influenced by Eliot's poem.

=== Music ===
- Eliot's poem inspired The Hollow Men (1944), a piece for trumpet and string orchestra by composer Vincent Persichetti and one of his most popular works.
- Finnish composer Kaija Saariaho set the last section of the poem as her first music theatre piece Study for Life in 1981, scored for soprano, tape, and lights. In 2019 Saariaho created a new version that was premiered in 2022.
- American metalcore band The Acacia Strain quoted the final line of Eliot's poem, and paraphrased the three lines prior in the song "Nightman" from their 2010 album, Wormwood.

== See also ==
- Gunpowder Plot in popular culture
- Modernist poetry in English
