= John Keenan (HolbyBlue) =

- HolbyBlue character
- First appearance: Episode 1; 8 May 2007
- Last appearance: "Episode 20; 5 June 2008
- Created by: Tony Jordan
- Portrayed by: Cal MacAninch

In-universe information
- Occupation: Detective inspector
- Family: John Keenan Sr. (father)
- Spouse: Kate Keenan
- Children: Tasha Keenan; Jamie Keenan

John Keenan is a fictional character from the British police drama HolbyBlue, portrayed by actor Cal MacAninch. John is a detective inspector in the Criminal Investigation Department (CID) of Holby South police station. MacAninch was involved in a long casting process for the role, but liked playing a police officer as his brothers are policemen. The character is billed as "fearless" and "straight-talking" with a dedication to his job that damages his marriage to Kate Keenan (Zöe Lucker). John's backstory is explored in series two through the introduction of his abusive father (Kenneth Colley).

== Casting ==
Actor Cal MacAninch called the casting for the role "a long drawn-out process". He had started rehearsals for a play when he first auditioned for the part, and the play was finished when he learned he had been successful. MacAninch commented, "But it was worth it when I saw the scripts. Any actor would love to play Keenan because he's a great hero." The actor also said that he had always wanted to play a police officer, as his brother were both policemen in real life. MacAninch was initially unaware that the show was a spin-off of medical drama Holby City and stated that if he had known, he might have thought twice about auditioning. However, he realised that the show "stands on its own two feet" and he reiterated that he liked the scripts. MacAninch was contracted for three years.

== Development ==
John is characterised as a "fearless" and "straight-talking" detective inspector. He is unafraid of "bending the rules" to solve his cases and is dedicated to his job. MacAninch called his character "a great hero". John is married to station reception officer Kate Keenan, portrayed by Zöe Lucker, but his devotion to his job has estranged their marriage. At the end of series one, John is promoted to acting detective chief inspector. He is relieved of the position when Scott Vaughan (Oliver Milburn) is hired, which John is pleased about as he dislikes the paperwork. MacAninch pointed out that Scott has to prove himself to John as his new boss.

The character's backstory is explored in series two with the introduction of his father, John Keenan Sr., portrayed by Kenneth Colley. MacAninch noted that John struggles to discuss his upbringing, even with Kate, which creates problems in their marriage. When investigating a domestic abuse case, John relates, having grown up in an abusive household. He then decides to his visit his abusive father in prison. MacAninch explained that John is "closing the door on that relationship" and does not want his father to become involved in his family. John's father reveals that Kate has been in contact with him already and has shared pictures of the family. MacAninch said that John feels "foolish, betrayed and frightened" by the revelation, as his father now knows where he lives. He added that John panics that he may have inherited his father's "vicious streak". The actor enjoyed working with Colley and praised his performance, commenting, "Ken doesn't look like a bully, but he manages to make him so playfully malevolent it was frightening."

== Storylines ==
John is a hardworking Police officer, good at his job and passionate about it. He works alongside Luke French. His rival in the series was Neculai Stenga but in a showdown Stenga was shot and killed by John after kidnapping his family. However, in the process John and Luke also get shot but recovered. John's old senior officer Detective Chief Inspector Harry Hutchinson was revealed to be a traitor feeding Stenga information about witnesses due to be giving evidence at a court trial against him, when John found out his respected mentor was corrupt he alerted the Directorate of Professional Standards (DPS) and arrested Harry resulting in his expulsion from the service, disgrace, and a prison sentence. John is not corrupt but is willing to bend rules in whatever way necessary to bring those he deems guilty to justice, something that Luke French disagrees with him over as Luke likes to do his work "by the book". John was acting DCI after Harry's departure

Kate Keenan is John's wife, both visibly funny and loyal. She got the job as a Station Reception Officer (SRO) with some input from John. She also works in Holby South Police Station, in which the same place as her husband John works as a Detective Inspector. In the first episode of Holby Blue when John found out his wife Kate Keenan, was seeing another man after their initial divorce, he became distracted from work, at one point even organising unofficially that he would be pulled over by the uniformed branch and fined. He still loves Kate and tried to win her back but ended up sleeping with Rachel to make Kate jealous. Much to Rachel's disdain he tells her he didn't love her and wanted Kate. As he began to reconcile with Kate, Rachel told John she fancied him and tried to stop John and Kate getting together by revealing she slept with John, Kate felt betrayed but John insisted he loved her. He then protested insisting Kate was not to be sacked when she slapped Rachel who called her children "Brats". He was also extremely worried when Kate was held hostage by Stenga, but managed to save her. He is now officially back with Kate. She broke up with him before and is still uneasy with him as she feels John cares only about his job. However that is something that John is beginning to regret and is trying to spend time with Kate and his child. John's new boss, DCI Scott Vaughan has however taken a shine to Kate and is now John's love rival.

== Reception ==
Janet Tansley of the Liverpool Echo branded John "the stereotypical grumpy Scottish bobby". The Daily Mirror's Jim Shelley dubbed him "absurdly intense". Gareth McLean of The Guardian praised MacAninach's performance in the domestic abuse story.
