= Clarke Peters =

American actor, writer, and director (born 1952)

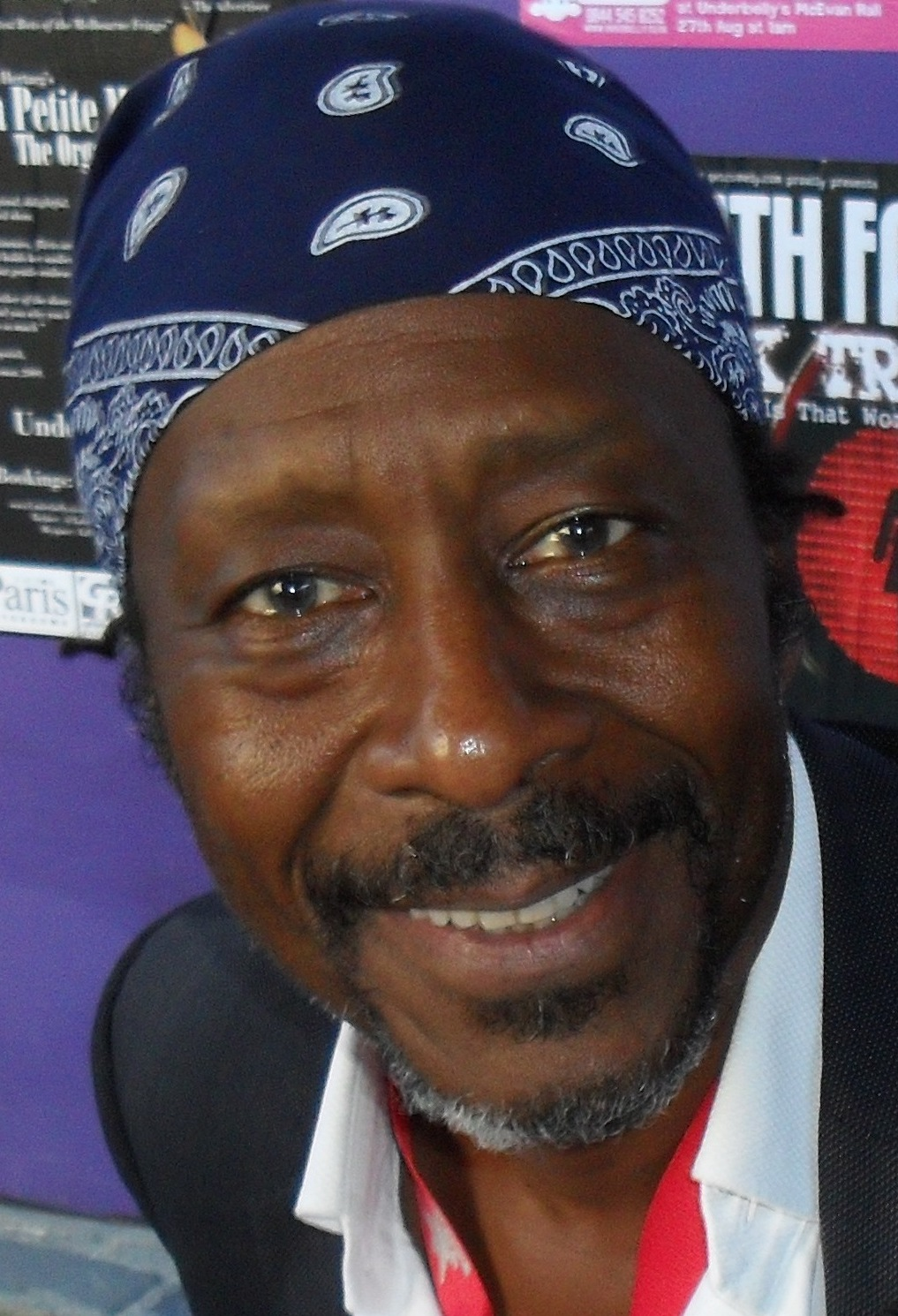
- Peters in Edinburgh in August 2010
- Born: Peter Clarke; April 7, 1952 (age 74); New York City, U.S.
- Occupations: Actor; writer; director
- Years active: 1970s–present
- Notable credit(s): The Wire; Five Guys Named Moe; Da 5 Bloods
- Spouses: Janine Martyne; Penny Ephson
- Children: 5, including Joe Jacobs

Peter Clarke (born April 7, 1952), known professionally as Clarke Peters, is an American actor, writer, and director, who has spent much of his adult life in the United Kingdom. He is best known for his roles as Lester Freamon in the television series The Wire (2002–2008) and Albert Lambreaux in the television series Treme (2010–2013). He wrote the book for the musical revue Five Guys Named Moe (1990).

Peters is also known for his roles in the films Silver Dream Racer (1980), Endgame (2009), John Wick (2014), Three Billboards Outside Ebbing, Missouri (2017), Harriet (2019), and Da 5 Bloods (2020), the lattermost of which earned him a nomination for the BAFTA Award for Best Actor in a Supporting Role.

== Early life ==
Peters was born Peter Clarke, the second of four sons of Martin, a commercial artist, and Loretta, a homemaker and clerical worker, in New York City, and grew up in Englewood, New Jersey. Loretta had wanted to work as a professional dancer at the Cotton Club but her mother had forbidden her from doing so. At the age of 12, he had his first theater experience, in a school production of My Fair Lady. He began to have serious ambitions to work in the theater at the age of 14. He graduated from Dwight Morrow High School in 1970.

== Career ==
In 1971, Peters' older brother enabled him to work as a costume designer for a production in Paris, France, of the musical Hair, in which Peters later starred. In 1973, Peters moved to London and changed his name to Clarke Peters, because Equity already had a namesake member. While in London, he formed a soul band, The Majestics, and worked as a backup singer on such hits as "Love and Affection" by Joan Armatrading, "Boogie Nights" by Heatwave, and some David Essex songs. However, music was not Peters' main ambition, and he preferred to work in the theater.

His first West End theatre musical roles, which he received with assistance from his friend Ned Sherrin, were I Gotta Shoe (1976) and Bubbling Brown Sugar (1977). Other West End credits include Blues in the Night, Porgy and Bess, The Witches of Eastwick, Guys and Dolls, Chicago, and Chess. Peters starred in the Sean Connery space Western Outland (1981) as the treacherous Sgt. Ballard, and he played an almost wordless role as Anderson, a vicious pimp in Neil Jordan's Mona Lisa (1986).

After writing several revues with Sherrin, in 1990 Peters wrote the revue Five Guys Named Moe, which received a Tony Award nomination for Best Book of a Musical. He followed this up with Unforgettable, a musical about Nat King Cole, which received scathing reviews. He also starred in the 2010 British production of Five Guys Named Moe.

As a stage actor, Peters has appeared on Broadway, where his performance in The Iceman Cometh (1999) won him the Theatre World Award, and he portrayed the shady lawyer Billy Flynn in the revival of Chicago in 2000 and 2003. In regional theatre he has appeared in Driving Miss Daisy, The Wiz, Bubbling Brown Sugar, Ma Rainey's Black Bottom, Carmen Jones, and The Amen Corner. In September 2011, Peters appeared on stage in a Sheffield Crucible Theatre production of Shakespeare's Othello, playing the title role opposite his Wire co-star Dominic West, who played Iago. In the 2014 New York Shakespeare in the Park festival, Peters played Gloucester in King Lear.

Peters is familiar to television viewers as Detective Lester Freamon in the HBO series The Wire. Peters also starred in the HBO mini-series The Corner, portraying a drug addict named Fat Curt, as well as the FX series Damages, as Dave Pell. Both The Wire and The Corner were created by writer and former The Baltimore Sun journalist David Simon. Peters also stars in Simon's HBO series Treme, in the role of Mardi Gras Indian chief Albert Lambreaux. Peters appeared in two episodes of the American time-travel/detective TV series Life on Mars (2008) as NYPD Captain Fletcher Bellow.

He also appeared in the British show Holby City, as Derek Newman, the father of nurse Donna Jackson. He voiced a part in the Doctor Who animated episode Dreamland, and in the In Plain Sight episode "Duplicate Bridge" as a man in Witness Protection named Norman Baker/Norman Danzer. In 2010, Peters read Rita Hayworth and Shawshank Redemption for BBC 7. In that year, he also had a guest appearance as Professor Mark Ramsay in the pilot episode of the USA Network TV series Covert Affairs. From 2012 to 2013, Peters had a recurring role as Alonzo D. Quinn in the CBS TV series Person of Interest.

Peters' movie credits include Mona Lisa (1986), Notting Hill (1999), K-PAX (2001), Freedomland (2006), Marley & Me (2008), Endgame (2009; in which he played Nelson Mandela), Nativity! (2009), the Spike Lee film Red Hook Summer (2012; in which he played Bishop Enoch), and Three Billboards Outside Ebbing, Missouri (2017).

Peters played Easy Rawlins in a 1997 BBC Radio 4 dramatization of Walter Mosley's Black Betty. He also narrated the BBC radio series Black Music in Europe: A Hidden History, as well as the audiobook version of Michael Chabon's novel Telegraph Avenue, released in September 2012 by HarperAudio.

In 2022, Peters portrayed John Houston, father and manager of American singer-actress Whitney Houston in the Whitney biopic, Whitney Houston: I Wanna Dance with Somebody.

Peters played Art Daniels in the Netflix series The Boroughs (2026).

== Personal life ==
Peters was politicized by the Vietnam War. Shortly before he left for Paris, he was arrested for obstructing police lines after an anti-Vietnam War demonstration but was cleared. He later said of this experience: "It made me more angry than anything else, because what I experienced was how impotent you could be as an American citizen." While in Paris, Peters received a letter from the FBI accusing him of draft evasion. He contested the charge, stating: "If the enemy comes to America, I'll be there, but I don't know the Vietnamese. If you put me in the army, I'm not going there."

Peters has had five children from three relationships. He and his first wife, Janine Martyne, had two children, China, an architect, and Peter, an artist. He later had a relationship with Joanna Jacobs, a daughter of the broadcaster David Jacobs, with whom he had two sons: Joe Jacobs, an actor, and Guppy, who died of a kidney tumor in 1992, at the age of four. He has a son, Max, with his second wife, Penny Ephson; Max played the young Michael Jackson in the West End production of the musical Thriller – Live.

As of 2012, Peters split his time between a house in the Charles Village section of Baltimore, which he bought in 2006 while working on The Wire, and one in London.

He is a follower of the Brahma Kumaris.

== Filmography ==
=== Film ===
Year	Title	Role	Notes	Ref.
1979	The Music Machine	Laurie		
1980	Silver Dream Racer	Cider Jones		
1981	Outland	Sgt. Ballard		
1986	Mona Lisa	Anderson		
1996	Seasick	Radio Reporter Pounds		
1999	Notting Hill	Helix Lead Actor		
2001	K-Pax	Homeless Veteran		
2003	Head of State	Fundraiser Demo-Tape Man		
2006	Freedomland	Reverend Longway		
2008	The Poker House	Maurice		
2008	Gigantic	Roger Stovall		
2008	Turnipseed	A.B. Turnipseed		
2008	Marley & Me	Editor		
2009	Endgame	Nelson Mandela		
2009	Brief Interviews with Hideous Men	Subject #31		
2009	Nativity!	Studio Boss		
2010	Locked In	Frank		
2011	Searching for Sonny	Narrator		
2012	Red Hook Summer	Da Good Bishop Enoch Rouse		
2014	John Wick	Harry		
2014	The Best of Me	Morgan Dupree		
2015	The Benefactor	Dr. Romano		
2015	The Bad Education Movie	Commander Andrews		
2017	Division 19	Perelman		
2017	Three Billboards Outside Ebbing, Missouri	Police Chief Abercrombie		
2018	An Acceptable Loss	Phillip Lamm		
2019	Harriet	Ben Ross		
2019	The Mandela Effect	Dr. Fuchs		
2020	Come Away	Mad Hatter		
2020	Da 5 Bloods	Otis		
2022	Whitney Houston: I Wanna Dance with Somebody	John Houston		
2024	Bonhoeffer	Reverend Powell Sr.		

=== Television ===
Year	Title	Role	Notes	Ref.
1980–1984	Play for Today	Yankee Billy / Stevie	2 episodes	
1983	The Professionals	President Ojuka	Episode: "The Ojuka Situation"	
1983	Saigon: Year of the Cat	Soldier	TV movie	
1985	Travelling Man	Alan Downing	Episode: "A Token Attempt"	
1989	Red King, White Knight	Jones	TV movie	
1989	Frederick Forsyth Presents: A Casualty of War	Grover T. Fleming	TV movie	
1991	El C.I.D.	Sultan	Episode: "Christmas Spirit"	
1992	A Masculine Ending	Theo Sykes	TV movie	
1993	Death Train	C.W. Whitlock	TV movie	
1993	Between the Lines	Mr. Banthorpe	Episode: "Jumping the Lights"	
1994	Murder Most Horrid	American	Episode: "Mangez Merveillac"	
1995	Chandler & Co	Jasper	Episode: "The American Dream"	
1996	French and Saunders	Lt. Johnny Cochrane	Episode: "The Quick and the Dead"	
1998	Jonathan Creek	Hewie Harper	2 episodes	
2000	The Corner	Fat Curt	Miniseries; 6 episodes	
2000	Oz	Afsana	Episode: "The Bill of Wrongs"	
2002	Night and Day	Gabriel Huysman	3 episodes	
2002–2008	The Wire	Det. Lester Freamon	Main cast; 55 episodes	
2003	Waking the Dead	Howard Boorstin	2 episodes: "Multistorey"	
2003, 2016	American Masters	Narrator	2 episodes: "James Brown: Soul Survivor"; "Fats Domino and The Birth of Rock 'n' Roll"	
2005	Law & Order: Trial by Jury	Rex da Silva	Episode: "Pattern of Conduct"	
2007	Meadowlands	Professor / Samantha's Father	Episode #1.6	
2008	Life on Mars	Captain Bellow	2 episodes	
2009	Damages	Dave Pell	8 episodes	
2009	In Plain Sight	Norman Baker / Norman Danzer	Episode: "Duplicate Bridge"	
2009	Great Performances	Walter de Courcy	Episode: "Chess in Concert"	
2009	Holby City	Derek Newman	5 episodes	
2009	Doctor Who: Dreamland	Night Eagle (voice)	4 episodes	
2010	Covert Affairs	Dr. Mark Ramsay	Episode: "Pilot"	
2010–2013	Treme	Albert Lambreaux	Main cast; 35 episodes	
2011	Archer	Popeye (voice)	2 episodes	
2011	Memphis Beat	Fred	Episode: "The Feud"	
2012–2013	Person of Interest	Alonzo Quinn	11 episodes	
2013	Blue Bloods	Nathan Anderson	Episode: "Quid Pro Quo"	
2014	True Detective	Minister	Episode: "The Long Bright Dark"	
2014	Death in Paradise	Marlon Croft	Episode: "Political Suicide"	
2014	The Divide	Isaiah Page	8 episodes	
2015	Forever	Jerry Charters	Episode: "The Wolves of Deep Brooklyn"	
2015	Midsomer Murders	Frank Wainwright	Episode: "The Ballad of Midsomer County"	
2015	Agatha Christie's Partners in Crime	Julius Hersheimmer	3 episodes	
2015	Show Me a Hero	Robert Mayhawk	2 episodes	
2015	London Spy	The American	Episode: "Strangers"	
2015	Jessica Jones	Det. Oscar Clemons	4 episodes	
2016	Jericho	Ralph Coates	8 episodes	
2016	Underground	Jay	3 episodes	
2016	The Tunnel	Sonny Persaud	4 episodes	
2016	People of Earth	Ronald	Episode: "Lost and Found"	
2016–2017	Chance	Carl Allan	9 episodes	
2017	The Blacklist: Redemption	Richard Whitehall	2 episodes	
2017	The Deuce	Melvin "Ace"	Episode: "My Name Is Ruby"	
2018	Bulletproof	Director-General Ronald Pike Sr	6 episodes	
2018	Love Is	Present-day Yasir	10 episodes	
2019	His Dark Materials	The Master of Jordan College	3 episodes (series 1)	
2019	Christmas Under the Stars	Clem	Television film (Hallmark)	
2020	Bumps	Charles	Television pilot	
2021	The Irregulars	The Linen Man	7 episodes	
2021	Foundation	Abbas	6 episodes	
2021	La Fortuna	Jonas Pierce	6 episodes	
2022	The Man Who Fell to Earth	Josiah Falls	Main role	
2024	Truelove	Ken	Miniseries, 6 episodes	
2024	Testament: The Story of Moses	Voice of God	Miniseries, 3 episodes	
2024	Eric	George	Miniseries	
2025	Towards Zero	Mr Treves	Three-part miniseries	
2025	Watson	Hamish Watson	Episode: "Giant Steps"	
2026	The Boroughs	Art Daniels	Main cast	
2026	Fightland	Eric Colman	4 episodes	

=== Theatre ===
Year	Title	Role	Venue	Director	Ref.
	Dispatches	T/O Joe the Priest; Johnson	National Theatre	Bill Bryde	
1987	Blues in the Night	Snake	Donmar Warehouse	Sheldon Epps	
1987	Amen Corner	Brother Boxer	Tricyle Theatre	Anton Phillips	
1988	Driving Miss Daisy	Hoke Coleburn	Apollo Theatre	Ron Lagomarsino	
1989–90	Ma Rainey's Black Bottom	Toledo	National Theatre	Howard Davies	
1990	Five Guys Names Moe	Four-Eyed Moe	Lyric Theatre	Charles Augins	
1993	Kiss of the Spiderwoman	The Warden	Shaftesbury Theatre	Hal Prince	
1996-7	Guys & Dolls	Sky Masterson	National Theatre	A Bird & R Eyrne	
1996	Chicago	Billy Flynn	Shubert Theatre	Walter Bobbie	
1998	The Iceman Cometh	Joe Mott	Almeida Theatre	Howard Davies	
1999	The Iceman Cometh	Joe Mott	Brooks Atkinson Theatre	Howard Davies	
	Chicago	Billy Flynn	Adelphi Theatre	Michael Grandage	
	Mourning Becomes Electra	Sef and Shantyman	National Theatre	Howard Davies	
2006-7	Porgy and Bess	Porgy	Savoy Theatre	Trevor Nunn	
2010	The Whipping Man	Simon	Pittsfield's Barrington	Christopher Innvar	
2011	Othello	Othello	Sheffield Theatre	Daniel Evans	
2013	Race	Henry Brown	Hampstead Theatre	Terry Johnson	
2014	King Lear	Earl of Gloucester	Shakespeare in the Park/Broadway	Daniel Sullivan	
2015	How to Succeed in Business Without Really Trying	Performer	Royal Festival Hall	Jonathan Butterell	
	The Royale	Wynton	Lincoln Center Theater	Rachel Chavkin	
2016	Simply Heavenly	Melon	Young Vic	Josette Bushell-Mingo	
2019	The American Clock	Robertson/Taylor/Moe 3	The Old Vic	Rachel Chavkin	
2024	King Lear	The Fool	Almeida Theatre	Yael Farber	

=== Audio dramas ===
Year	Title	Role	Notes	Ref.
1997	Black Betty	Easy Rawlins	BBC Radio	
2008	Dr No	Quarrel	BBC Radio	
2014–2015	Elvis McGonagall Takes a Look on the Bright Side	Narrator	BBC Radio	
2016	Blood Count	Duke Ellington	BBC Radio	
2017	The Underground Railroad	Narrator	BBC Radio, abridged audiobook reading	
2002	The Gold Bug	Charles	BBC Radio	
2022	Marvel's Wastelanders: Wolverine	Charles Xavier / Professor X	Podcast	
2022	Marvel's Wastelanders	Charles Xavier / Professor X	Podcast	
2023	The Mantawauk Caves	Detective Solomon Smith	Podcast	

== Awards and nominations ==
Association	Year	Category	Work	Result	Ref.
AARP Movies for Grownups Awards	2021	Best Supporting Actor	Da 5 Bloods	Nominated	
AARP Movies for Grownups Awards	2021	Best Ensemble	Da 5 Bloods	Nominated	
Awards Circuit Community Awards	2017	Best Cast Ensemble	Three Billboards Outside Ebbing, Missouri	Nominated	
British Academy Film Awards	2021	Best Actor in a Supporting Role	Da 5 Bloods	Nominated	
Critics' Choice Movie Awards	2018	Best Acting Ensemble	Three Billboards Outside Ebbing, Missouri	Won	
Critics' Choice Movie Awards	2021	Best Acting Ensemble	Da 5 Bloods	Nominated	
Detroit Film Critics Society	2017	Best Ensemble	Three Billboards Outside Ebbing, Missouri	Nominated	
Georgia Film Critics Association	2018	Best Ensemble	Three Billboards Outside Ebbing, Missouri	Won	
Indiana Film Journalists Association	2021	Best Ensemble Acting	Da 5 Bloods	Nominated	
Laurence Olivier Awards	1996	Best Actor in a Musical	Unforgettable	Nominated	
Laurence Olivier Awards	1999	Best Actor in a Musical	Chicago	Nominated	
Laurence Olivier Awards	2007	Best Actor in a Musical	Porgy and Bess	Nominated	
Music City Film Critics Association	2021	Best Ensemble Acting	Da 5 Bloods	Nominated	
NAACP Image Awards	2013	Outstanding Supporting Actor in a Drama Series	Treme	Nominated	
NAACP Image Awards	2020	Outstanding Ensemble Cast in a Motion Picture	Harriet	Nominated	
NAACP Image Awards	2021	Outstanding Supporting Actor in a Motion Picture	Da 5 Bloods	Nominated	
NAACP Image Awards	2021	Outstanding Ensemble Cast in a Motion Picture	Da 5 Bloods	Nominated	
National Board of Review	2021	Best Ensemble	Da 5 Bloods	Won	
Online Film Critics Society	2017	Best Ensemble	Three Billboards Outside Ebbing, Missouri	Won	
San Diego Film Critics Society	2017	Best Ensemble	Three Billboards Outside Ebbing, Missouri	Nominated	
Screen Actors Guild Awards	2021	Outstanding Performance by a Cast in a Motion Picture	Da 5 Bloods	Nominated	
Seattle Film Critics Society	2017	Best Ensemble	Three Billboards Outside Ebbing, Missouri	Nominated	
Washington D.C. Area Film Critics Association	2017	Best Ensemble	Three Billboards Outside Ebbing, Missouri	Won	
