= Jack Keenan =

Jack Keenan may refer to:

- Jack Keenan (American football) (1919–1977), American football guard
- Jack Keenan (baseball) (1869–1909), American baseball pitcher
- Jack Keenan (boxer) (1929-2009), Canadian boxer
- Jack Keenan (footballer) (1864–1906), English footballer

== See also ==
- John Keenan (disambiguation)
