= Glen Murphy =

British actor (born 1957)

Glen Murphy MBE
- Born: 6 April 1957 (age 69); West Ham, East London, England
- Occupations: Actor; musician
- Years active: 1975–present
- Spouse: Linda Murphy
- Children: 4
- Awards: Freedom of the City of London MBE

Glen Murphy MBE (born 6 April 1957) is a British actor and producer, best known as Firefighter George Green between 1988 and 2002 on the ITV's television drama London's Burning.

== Early life ==
Murphy attended St Bonaventure's Catholic School in Forest Gate, where he was a guitarist in a local blues band, Bon's Boy. He won West Ham, London and Essex championships in Football and boxing also boxing internationally in his youth. After a short spell in the professional boxing world he started playing semi professional football with Enfield F.C. after spells with Chelsea FC & Charlton FC. His brother, Darren Murphy was a guitarist in the punk band Wasted Youth. his 18 yr old Grandson [[Jett Murphy]] has just signed a Professional Contract for West Ham united FC

Murphy has a 3rd Dan black belt in karate in the Kyokushin style and has trained in martial arts for over 40 years.

His acting career began in the play Johnny Boxer at Half Moon Theatre in Alie St, east London, and then Guilty Generation and several plays & musicals including Jailhouse Rock. along with many well known Musicians at his fathers pub [[the Bridge House E16]] He then performed at the Theatre Royal Stratford East in Stratford, London, in their TIE Company Theatre Venture for a year.

== Career ==
After 6 Months of playing uncredited roles on TV, Murphy began to gain more prominent parts during the mid-1980s in series such as Robin of Sherwood, Murphy's Mob and Shine On Harvey Moon. In 1986 he appeared in the Doctor Who serial The Mysterious Planet as Dibber.

In 1988 he joined the cast of London's Burning as the character George Green and appeared in 170 episodes. He was the only actor to appear throughout the entire run of the series, which attracted 18.92 million viewers for its 5th season, and averaged 15 million in its 14-year reign. He was the subject of This Is Your Life in 1992.

After London's Burning he appeared in The Bill, Tank Malling, the Karl Howman directed drama Fathers of Girls, and alongside Joely Richardson in Shoreditch.

His later work includes as a producer and lead actor in the film "Lords of London"(2014). It won best film at the New York Hell's Kitchen Film Festival, and he won the best Actor award at the Abruzzo film festival in Italy; it was released in the United States by Lionsgate on 1 September 2015.

In 2020, he appeared in the Freddie Mills biopic Finger of Suspicion. He had a leading role in the Royal National Theatre production of Patrick Marber's Dealer's Choice (Writers Guild Award & Evening Standard Awards) and in the world premiere of " Munich Athens at the Soho Theatre in the West End of London in 1987 & 1995. Consecutively Also Glen played the lead in the national tour of A Gentle Hook in 2004–05.

== Awards ==
He was awarded the Freedom of the City of London in 1995. He was also awarded a Member of the Order of the British Empire in 2007 for his charity work.
