= HolbyBlue =

British police procedural drama series

- A still from the opening title sequence of HolbyBlue
- Also known as: Holby Blue
- Genre: Police procedural drama
- Created by: Tony Jordan
- Written by: Tony Jordan; James Payne; Sarah Phelps; Jeff Povey; Richard Davidson; Marc Pye; Ben Vanstone; Debbie O'Malley; Jake Riddell; Graham Mitchell; Simon Booker
- Directed by: Martin Hutchings; Bryn Higgins; Barnaby Southcombe; Sarah O'Gorman; Toby Haynes; Jim Loach; Menhaj Huda
- Composer: Mark Hinton-Stewart
- Country of origin: United Kingdom
- Original language: English
- No. of series: 2
- No. of episodes: 20 (list of episodes)

Production
- Executive producers: Tony Jordan; Karen Wilson
- Producer: Claire Phillips
- Cinematography: Ian Liggett; John Daly; Stephan Pehrsson
- Editors: Jeremy Strachan; Jim Hamptom; Scott Flyger; Xavier Russell; John Gow
- Running time: 60 minutes
- Production companies: BBC; Red Planet Pictures; Kudos

Original release
- Network: BBC One
- Release: 8 May 2007 – 5 June 2008

Related
- Casualty; Holby City

HolbyBlue (also known as Holby Blue) is a British police procedural drama series that ran for two series from 2007 to 2008. The show revolves around the daily lives of a number of police officers working at Holby South police station. The cast for series one included Jimmy Akingbola as PC Neil Parker, Joe Jacobs as PC William "Billy" Jackson, David Sterne as Sergeant Edward 'Mac' McFadden, Cal Macaninch as DI John Keenan, James Hillier as Sergeant Christian Young, Kacey Ainsworth as Inspector Jenny Black, Richard Harrington as DS Luke French, Zöe Lucker as Kate Keenan, Chloe Howman as PC Kelly Cooper, Kieran O'Brien as PC Robert Clifton, Tim Pigott-Smith as DCI Harry Hutchinson, Sara Powell as Rachel Barker and Elaine Glover as PC Lucy Slater. Velibor Topić and Julie Cox joined the cast in a recurring capacity as drug baron Neculai Stenga and Mandy French, Luke French's wife. By the end of series one, Pigott-Smith and Topic both departed the show. Series two saw the introductions of Oliver Milburn as DCI Scott Vaughan and James Thornton as Constable Jake Loughton. Stephanie Langton took over from Julie Cox in series two to continue playing the role of Mandy.

The series was announced on 27 April 2006, and was created by Tony Jordan as a spin-off from the established medical drama Holby City. The show premiered on 8 May 2007. HolbyBlue ran for two series and was cancelled by the BBC on 6 August 2008, after ratings fell from an initial 5.64 million viewers to a low of 2.5 million viewers. Tony Jordan and Karen Wilson served as the show's executive producers, while Claire Phillips was the producer. Jordan spent time with first serving officers and believed that the key to a successful police drama was its ability to reflect a society "in which it existed". Jordan made the decision to emulate two American police dramas: Hill Street Blues and NYPD Blue. The BBC suggested that Jordan used the "Holby" brand to "create a third arm of the successful Casualty and Holby City format". Jordan questioned whether the series would be "held in disdain" by "soap snobs", but made the ultimate decision to name the drama HolbyBlue after remembering the "joy" he took from "surprising the audience by subverting expectation".

HolbyBlue received mixed reception. Rachel Cooke from The Observer criticised the show's unoriginal characterisation, while The Times' Andrew Billen stated that the most that could be said for the show was that it had a healthy pace, and occasionally well-written dialogue. On the contrary, David Chater from the same newspaper praised the show's "high energy level" and casting. Chater also suggested the show would serve to be strong competition for ITV's police drama The Bill. Jod Mitchell of The Daily Telegraph expressed that the series injected "pace and verve" into the BBC One schedule. Mark Wright from The Stage branded the opening episode of HolbyBlue "boring", with some "duff casting". Wright also criticised the decision to launch the show under the Holby moniker, opining that it is not a true brand as Casualty and Holby City both possess "distinct personalities".

During its lifespan, HolbyBlue was nominated for six awards: Best Drama at the Inside Soap Awards in 2007 and 2008; Best New Drama Series at the TV Quick & TV Choice Awards; actresses Zöe Lucker and Kacey Ainsworth for Best Actress, also at the TV Quick and Inside Soap Awards, and actor Jimmy Akingbola for Best Male Performance in TV at the Screen Nation Awards.

== Plot ==
In series one, DI John Keenan learns that his estranged wife, Kate Keenan, is dating a new man. John has sex with senior crown prosecutor Rachel Barker, but quickly regrets his decision to have sex with her. Kate is then employed as a receptionist at the police station, but later attacks Rachel after she is provoked. Kate tenders her resignation, but John manages to convince her to remain at the police station. The pair later reconcile. DS Luke French works with John to take down drugs baron Neculai Stenga. DCI Harry Hutchinson acts as Neculai's informant, but John is convinced that PC Billy Jackson is the informant. John later learns that Harry is Neculai's informant after catching him leaving Neculai's warehouse, which leads to a hostage situation involving Kate and her children. John and Luke rescue Kate and the children; although they are shot in the process, they both survive. Newly appointed PC Lucy Slater is stabbed while out on duty. She recovers, and begins dating a drug dealer. Her former partner, PC Robert Clifton, learns of Lucy's boyfriend's criminal reputation and forces the pair to separate. DS Luke French and his wife, Mandy French, fail their second attempt at IVF. Luke and Mandy argue over Luke's divided priorities between her and his terminally ill mother. Luke agrees to put his terminally ill mother in a care home, but is later heartbroken when she dies following a fall. PC Kelly Cooper struggles with her financial difficulties and considers stealing money she finds while out on duty. Inspector Jenny Black ends her marriage with her husband, Alex Black, when she learns he is having an affair. PC Neil Parker is offered a promotion, but he is dismayed upon learning it is political as opposed to merit-based.

In series two, well-established Holby City character Jac Naylor is arrested on suspicion of the murder of Alan Clooney, a well-known sex offender who tried to rape her. She is later released when a mystery witness comes forward. Luke becomes a father for the first time with wife Mandy; she later dies unexpectedly after a roadside incident. Kate flirts with a man she finds at a police event, only to later learn she has been flirting with new boss, DCI Scott Vaughan. Robert is encouraged by Lucy to ask an ex-girlfriend of his to see their son. Robert's ex agrees to allowing him to see their son at the end of his shift. However, while Robert and Lucy are out on duty, gang violence results in the death of one of the gang members. Robert and Lucy visit the relatives of Connor in the aftermath of his death, where Robert is murdered by the victim's brother. John goes to visit his father in jail, which strains his relationship with Kate. It later transpires that John's father was imprisoned for abusing prostitutes. Neil develops feelings for Kelly and inadvertently reveals them to her. Kelly later tells Neil that she is not interested in him, and nothing will develop between them.

== Cast and characters ==
=== Main ===
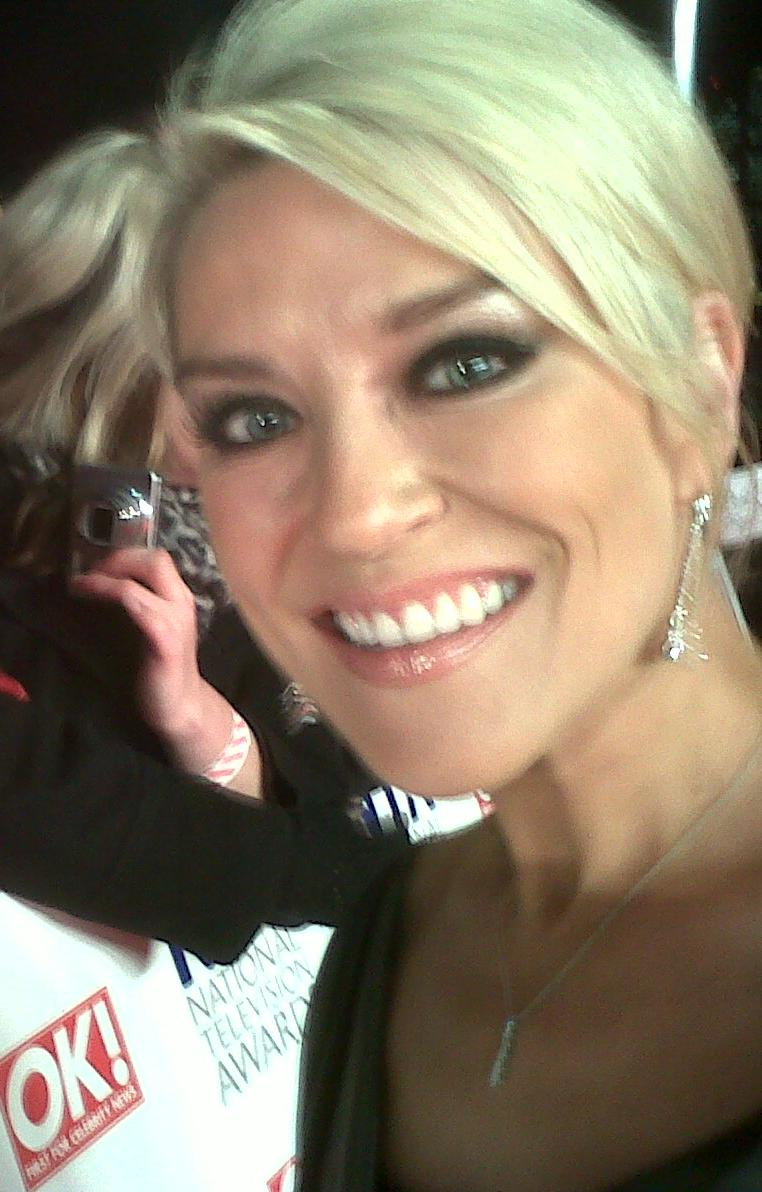
Zöe Lucker (pictured) stars as Kate Keenan.

- Jimmy Akingbola as PC Neil Parker (series 1–2): a police officer who is ambitious to one day become a DCI. When he is offered a promotion, Neil is unhappy to learn the promotion is politically based.
- Joe Jacobs as PC William "Billy" Jackson (series 1–2): a kind-hearted police officer who is intent on improving the city he lives in. Billy is wrongly accused of being the informant of Neculai Stenga in series one.
- David Sterne as Sergeant Edward 'Mac' McFadden (series 1–2): an antiquated sergeant who is convinced that most incidences can be resolved by using forceful methods of punishment.
- Cal Macaninch as DI John Keenan (series 1–2): a dedicated inspector who is fearless and prioritises his job over marriage, costing him his wife, Kate Keenan, who cheats on him.
- James Hillier as Sergeant Christian Young (series 1–2): a manic depressive sergeant who is in charge of the custody suite of the police station.
- Kacey Ainsworth as Inspector Jenny Black (series 1–2): an inspector who is hard-working, respected and dedicated to her role. Jenny ended her relationship with her husband after learning he had an affair.
- Richard Harrington as DS Luke French (series 1–2): an ambitious, caring, keen and eager police sergeant who is intent on making a difference within the community.
- Zöe Lucker as Kate Keenan (series 1–2): a newly promoted desk officer who jeopardises her career after attacking Rachel Barker, who has been having sex with her ex-husband.
- Chloe Howman as PC Kelly Cooper (series 1–2): a confident police officer who finds herself considering stealing money while on a shift in order to aid her financial struggles. Kelly attracts the attention of Neil, who she rejects.
- Kieran O'Brien as PC Robert Clifton (series 1–2): a police officer who broke up his former girlfriend, PC Lucy Smith's, relationship after she dates a drug dealer. Robert was murdered in series two by a grieving family member.
- Tim Pigott-Smith as DCI Harry Hutchinson (series 1): a corrupt chief inspector on the Holby South police force, who passed information on to notorious drug baron Neculai Stenga.
- Sara Powell as Rachel Barker (series 1–2): a woman who works for the Crown Prosecution Service. Rachel provokes a fight with Kate Keenan after having sex with Kate's former husband, John.
- Elaine Glover as PC Lucy Slater (series 1–2): a police officer who begins unknowingly dating a drug dealer after being stabbed on duty. She is later saved from her relationship with the drug dealer by her former partner, Robert Clifton.
- Oliver Milburn as DCI Scott Vaughan (series 2): a detective chief inspector brought in following the arrest of DCI Harry Hutchinson. Scott is ambitious in his role and is dedicated to his colleagues at Holby South.
- James Thornton as Constable Jake Loughton (series 2): a constable transferred to Holby South from elsewhere. Jake is secretive about why he was transferred; it later transpires he was formerly a sergeant.

=== Recurring ===
- Velibor Topić as Neculai Stenga (series 1): a notorious drug baron who uses DCI Harry Hutchinson to extract information from the police force in order to sell drugs.
- Julie Cox (series 1) and Stephanie Langton (series 2) as Mandy French: DS Luke French's wife, who is unable to conceive a child after many attempts of IVF, straining her relationship with Luke. In series two, Mandy dies after being struck down by a car in a roadside incident.

== Production ==
=== Development ===
The BBC announced the creation of HolbyBlue on 27 April 2006. The newly-proposed drama was revealed to be a police spin-off from medical drama Holby City. It was also confirmed that Tony Jordan had been recruited to work on the scripts and consider "how storylines between the police station and the hospital could be intertwined for the programme." Three production companies were involved in the development of HolbyBlue: BBC, Kudos and Red Planet Pictures. The Guardian picked up on the BBC's reverse tactic of creating a police procedural spin-off drama from a medical drama, compared to ITV, which "spawned a hospital spin-off", The Royal, from original police procedural drama, Heartbeat.

Upon being approached by the BBC to develop a new police procedural drama, Jordan explained that he was conflicted between emulating the former BBC police drama Dixon of Dock Green, using "a set of flawless characters roaming the streets dispensing justice and words of wisdom", or creating a more modern drama, developing characters who would "snort a line of coke, beat up the missus on the way out and shag each other in the locker rooms". Jordan went on to research his new project by spending time with first serving officers, who "portrayed a world of endless, statistic-led red tape". After spending time with first serving officers, Jordan concluded that he was left with an image "not of a modern-day police force, fighting crime on the streets and keeping us all safe, but some kind of unwieldy, top-heavy administrative process, more concerned with public opinion than dispensing justice."

Jordan felt that the key to a successful police drama was its ability to reflect the society "in which it existed". Answers about what best reflected the society that people lived came from joint head of Kudos, Jane Featherstone. As a result of a conversation with Featherstone, Jordan created a drama in which his characters would be forced to deal with limited resources and bureaucracy stemming from the war on terror, whilst trying to combat domestic crime. Jordan decided to imitate two American police dramas: Hill Street Blues and NYPD Blue, using "flawed characters, who still managed to be heroes", while also aiming to "accurately reflect society".

The final element to the creation of HolbyBlue was deciding on a name for the programme. The BBC suggested that Jordan used the "Holby" brand, to "create a third arm of the successful Casualty and Holby City format". Jordan considered the use of the Holby brand, but questioned whether the series would be "held in disdain" by "soap snobs". Jordan decided to use the Holby brand after remembering the "joy" he took from "surprising the audience by subverting expectation".

=== Broadcast ===
Filming for HolbyBlue began at the end of January 2007. The Guardian reported that HolbyBlue would air on a Wednesday evening, with editor John Plunkett suggesting that the show could be used to solve the BBC's "long-running ratings black hole on Wednesday nights". However, it was also noted that if HolbyBlue aired on a Wednesday night, it would clash with ITV's long-running police drama, The Bill. In order to avoid disruption and clashes between HolbyBlue and The Bill, the first series of HolbyBlue was scheduled to air at 8pm on a Tuesday evening, replacing Holby City's former timeslot, with Holby City moving to 8pm on a Thursday night instead. HolbyBlue was initially scheduled to commence airing on 1 May 2007, however it was later postponed by one week for unknown reasons. The first series of HolbyBlue ran from 8 May 2007 to 26 June 2007.

On 21 June 2007, the BBC announced that HolbyBlue would be re-commissioned for an extended second series, increasing from eight to twelve episodes − a 50% increase in the number of episodes. The second series was filmed in Surrey in late 2007 for transmission in early 2008. Jordan commented on the BBC's decision to continue the series, stating that the "vote of confidence" provided by the BBC was "a huge boost for both HolbyBlue and Red Planet Pictures". Co-executive producer Karen Wilson added that the re-commissioning was "brilliant news", while then Controller of BBC Drama Production, John Yorke said "BBC One is the perfect home for well-written, stylish and popular drama and we are proud to once again have HolbyBlue as a key pre-watershed drama in our schedule for next year." The second series of HolbyBlue was rescheduled for 8pm on a Thursday night, and ran from 20 March 2008 to 5 June 2008.

=== Cancellation ===
On 6 August 2008, the BBC announced that, due to declining ratings, HolbyBlue would not be commissioned for a third series. The second series began with an audience of 5.6 million viewers, however ratings fell to 2.5 million viewers by the series finale. Claire Phillips, Red Planet Picture's drama executive, spoke out about the news of the axing, stating that "HolbyBlue set new standards for 8pm dramas, in terms of production values, storytelling and casting." Phillips added that the company was "extremely proud" of the 20 hours of drama that were created, and concluded with Red Planet Pictures' focus turning to "developing shows which will live up to those high standards set out on HolbyBlue."

== Reception ==
=== Critical reception ===
The Observer's Rachel Cooke reviewed the first episode negatively, criticising the acting and unoriginal characterisation. Cooke predicted that HolbyBlue would be a ratings success, but found the series' lack of originality inexcusable given that the BBC is funded by the television licence fee. The Times' Andrew Billen commented that John Keenan was "such a cliché that his new deputy Luke French told him that he was a cliché while admitting that, as a graduate recruit, he was a cliché himself". Billen added that the most that could be said for the show was that it had a healthy pace, and occasionally well-written dialogue. David Chater from the same newspaper also commented on the unoriginality of the characterisation, but praised the "high energy level" and casting. He found it "watchable enough", and suggested that it would prove strong competition to The Bill. Andre Pettie of The Daily Telegraph disliked the pacing, observing that the script moved so fast it was hard to judge the quality of the series, concluding that it was overall unsatisfactory. In contrast, The Guardian's Nancy Banks-Smith reviewed the episode positively, calling it "fast and funny and punctuated with poignancy", and Jod Mitchell of The Daily Telegraph praised the intelligent writing and fast direction, writing that despite its familiarity, the series injected "pace and verve" into the BBC One schedule.

The Guardian's Gareth McLean observed that the opening episode contrasted the typical "cosiness" of Holby City and Casualty, and described HolbyBlue as "somewhere between the excellent City Central and the appalling Merseybeat". McLean later deemed Keenan "two-dimensional", but still found him to be an improvement on the series' female characters, who he felt were extremely under-written. In February 2008, McLean described HolbyBlue as "far from perfect", but went on to review the sixth episode of series two positively, commenting that the previously disappointing programme had finally improved, with "a compelling and tense episode that both pleases series regulars and delivers a powerful hour of stand-alone drama." McLean felt that the episode tackled the issue of domestic violence intelligently, and praised "sterling performances" by Macaninch, Lucker, Colley and Drew.

The crossover episode in which Holby City's Jac Naylor is interrogated by the HolbyBlue police officers attracted mixed reviews. Helen Rumbelow of The Times reviewed the episode favourably compared to season premiere episodes of House and Grey's Anatomy which aired on the same evening. Rumbleow praised HolbyBlue's superior pacing, writing that while it had "clumsy, absurd and predictable" moments, and seemed "amateurish, unsophisticated and old-fashioned" compared to the US dramas, it was still good, with "moments of light and dark in the right place, the characters perfectly introduced and just the right amount of intrigue seeded." In contrast, The Guardian's Sam Wollaston stated that he was still unconvinced by HolbyBlue, deeming it inferior to The Bill. McLean was also unimpressed, writing,

Should the appearance of Holby City's spiky Jac in HolbyBlue, on suspicion of attempted murder, be greeted with interest or indifference? Certainly, the dull cop show needs all the help it can get as, entering its second series, none of the problems of the first have been worked out. The police are still a thoroughly passive bunch who don't so much solve crime as stand around and wait for crimes to be solved by way of coincidence and happenstance. And Jac's plot is so well signposted that you're left not anticipating its resolution but frustrated that it took so long.

— Gareth McLean, The Guardian

Mark Wright of The Stage was a frequent reviewer of HolbyBlue. He found the opening episode "boring", deeming it "a cliché-ridden disaster with some duff casting decisions and bizarrely clunky dialogue". Wright criticised the decision to launch the show under the Holby moniker, opining that it is not a true brand as Casualty and Holby City both possess "distinct personalities". He noted that he loathes the former and loves the latter, but concluded that despite differing audience demographics, they are both hospital dramas and it does not follow that their audiences would also enjoy a police procedural. Despite his criticism, Wright was pleased when the programme was recommissioned for a second series, hoping that an increased number of episodes would allow the production team to fix issues with HolbyBlue and further develop its format. Following the programme's cancellation, Wright gave HolbyBlue a mixed review. He described the first series as "disastrous", writing that it was largely unoriginal and impeded by the Holby brand, but deemed series two "a great improvement, with some excellent and quite engrossing character drama".

=== Ratings ===
The first episode of HolbyBlue was watched by an audience of 5.46 million viewers on BBC One, making it the fifteenth most-watched programme on the channel for the week of its broadcast. The second episode saw a fall in the ratings by 300,000 viewers, to 5.16 million viewers, making it the seventeenth most-watched programme on the channel for the week of its broadcast. The episode received a 26% audience share for its timeslot. The following episode dropped to 4.42 million viewers and twenty-fifth in the weekly rankings. Despite a 23% decrease in audience share, it continued to lead in its timeslot. By episode five, viewership had declined to 4.10 million and a 21% audience share, but the show remained the most-watched at 8pm. The same was true of episode six, watched by 4 million viewers with a 20% audience share. Viewership for episodes four to six fell below the channel's top thirty in the weekly rankings. The final two episodes of series one experienced an increase in viewership, to 4.13 and 4.36 million respectively, ranking HolbyBlue twenty-sixth then twenty-fourth in the channel ratings for the weeks of broadcast.

The first episode of the second series attracted the highest all-time rating of HolbyBlue, with 5.62 million viewers watching the episode, making the episode the twelfth most-watched programme on the channel for the week of its broadcast. However, the following episode saw a decline in the ratings for HolbyBlue after it clashed with ITV's police drama The Bill, with The Bill recording 5.4 million viewers and a 23% audience share, compared to HolbyBlue's 4.1 million viewers and 18% audience share. Episode three was watched by 3.8 million viewers, attaining an 18% audience share, again beaten in its timeslot by The Bill. Episodes four and five were watched by 3.5 and 3.4 million viewers respectively; both episodes were again beaten by The Bill, and while episode six saw a slight rise in viewership to 3.6 million, The Bill lengthened its lead against HolbyBlue, attaining a 23% audience share, compared to HolbyBlue's 16%. By episode eight, HolbyBlue had fallen to 3.2 million viewers. It maintained its 16% share, as opposed to The Bill's increased audience share, to 26%. With its ninth episode, the series fell even further, to 2.9 million viewers, while its audience share again decreased, this time to 14%. Episodes ten and eleven were watched by 2.8 and 2.6 million viewers respectively, with viewership declining to 2.5 million by the time of the series' cancellation.

The table below shows the two series' average number of viewers.

Series	Episodes	Premiere	Finale	Viewers (in millions)	Notes
1	8	8 May 2007	26 June 2007	4.71	(Note: Final viewership data is unavailable for three episodes in series one. Episodes 4, 5 and 6 all fell below the top 30. The series' average viewership is therefore calculated based on the remaining five episodes.)
2	12	20 March 2008	5 June 2008	5.03	(Note: Final viewership data is unavailable for ten episodes in series two. Episodes 3, 4, 5, 6, 7, 8, 9, 10, 11 and 12 all fell below the top 30. The series' average viewership is therefore calculated based on the remaining two episodes.)

=== Accolades ===
HolbyBlue was nominated for six awards during its lifespan, of which it failed to win any. The series was nominated under the category 'Best Drama' twice at the Inside Soap Awards in 2007 and 2008. Actresses Kacey Ainsworth and Zöe Lucker were both nominated for 'Best Actress' at the TV Quick & TV Choice Awards in 2007, while the drama itself also received a nomination under the 'Best New Drama Series' at the TV Quick & TV Choice Awards in 2007. In 2008, actor Jimmy Akingbola was nominated at the Screen Nation Awards under the 'Best Male Performance in TV' category.

Year	Award	Category	Nominee	Result	Ref
2007	Inside Soap Awards	Best Drama	HolbyBlue	Nominated	
2007	TV Quick & TV Choice Awards	Best Actress	Kacey Ainsworth	Nominated	
2007	TV Quick & TV Choice Awards	Best Actress	Zöe Lucker	Nominated	
2007	TV Quick & TV Choice Awards	Best New Drama Series	HolbyBlue	Nominated	
2008	Inside Soap Awards	Best Drama	HolbyBlue	Nominated	
2008	Screen Nation Awards	Best Male Performance in TV	Jimmy Akingbola	Nominated	
