= Cob coaling =

Traditional Bonfire Night custom practiced in the Yorkshire-Lancashire border region

Cob coaling, cob-a-coaling or cob calling was a traditional Bonfire Night custom practiced in the Yorkshire-Lancashire border region, which involved groups of people going door-to-door and singing a song in return for Bonfire Night supplies. In more recent times, singers collected firewood and money for fireworks, but "coaling" refers to the coal that would previously have been collected. The Cob Coaling Song is listed as number 9234 in the Roud Folk Song Index.

== History ==
The song was probably part of a medieval mummer's play before being adapted to modern Bonfire Night traditions. The practice of cob coaling has parallels in other festive door-to-door begging traditions such as wassailing and souling.

Cob coaling was popular as recently as the 1970s, but probably died out some time in the 1980s.

== Song ==
=== Traditional versions ===
A version of the song was collected by the folklorist Ken Stubbs from Eddie Collins and Hazel Collins in 1964. The recording he made can be heard on the Vaughan Williams Memorial Library website.

There are several variations to the song, but the following lyrics seem to have been a popular variant:

“We come a Cob-coaling for Bonfire time,

Your coal and your money we hope to enjoy.

Fal-a-dee, fal-a-die, fal-a-diddly-i-do-day.

For down in yon’ cellar there’s an owd umberella

And up on yon’ corner there’s an owd pepperpot.

Pepperpot! Pepperpot! Morning ’till night.

If you give us nowt, we’ll steal nowt and bid you good night.

Up a ladder, down a wall, a cob o’coal would save us all.

If you don’t have a penny a ha’penny will do.

If you don’t have a ha’penny, then God bless you.

We knock at your knocker and ring at your bell

To see what you’ll give us for singing so well.”

The two lines beginning "If you don't have a penny..." are taken from the Christmas rhyme and folk song "Christmas is Coming", which was also used for door-to-door money-collecting traditions, but at Christmas time. The tune could be related to popular wassailing songs, which were used for a similar purpose.

=== Popular versions ===
The Watersons sang "Cob-a-Coaling" for their first album Frost and Fire (1965), but it wasn't included in the final cut. They did, however, release a 1991 re-recording on their album "Mighty River of Song".

The Oldham Tinkers sang the song on their album Best O 'T' Bunch (1974). Oldham was one of the locations with the strongest cob coaling tradition.
