= Sooz Kempner =

English actress, singer and stand-up comedian

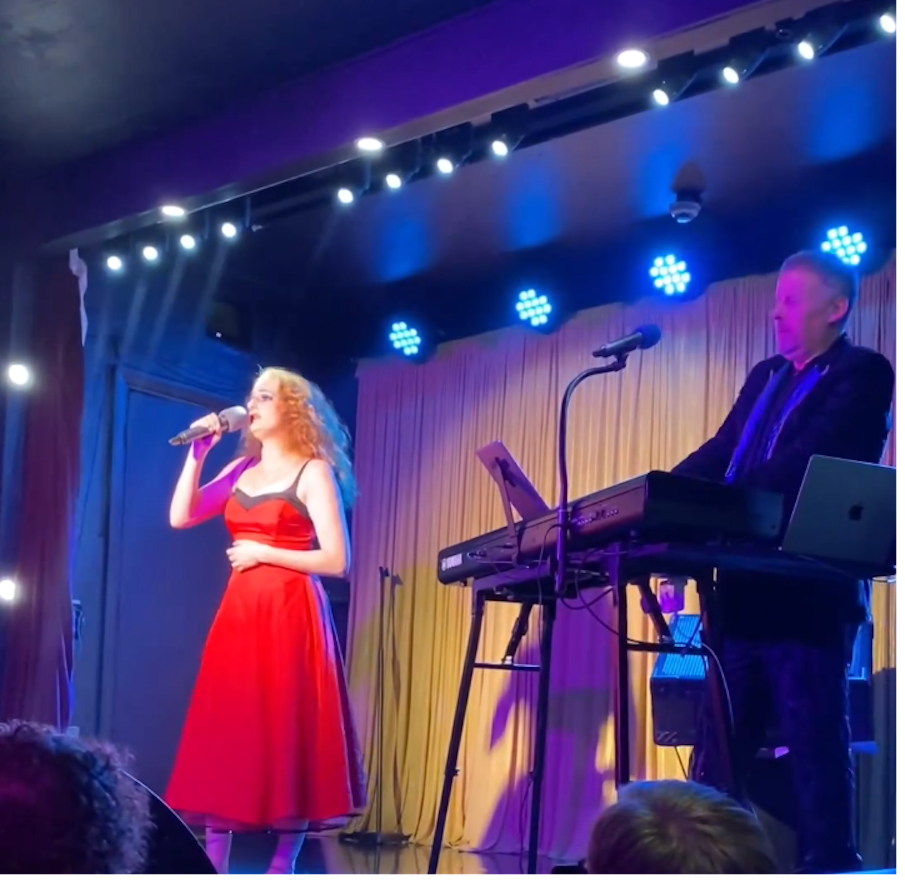
- Sooz Kempner at the Royal Vauxhall Tavern
- Born: Suzanna Maria Kempner; Haywards Heath, West Sussex, England
- Education: Royal Academy of Music
- Relatives: Luke Kempner (brother)

Comedy career
- Years active: 2009–present
- Medium: Stand-up
- Website: soozkempner.co.uk

Suzanna Maria Kempner is an English stand-up comedian, actress and singer.

== Biography ==
Suzanna Maria Kempner was born in Haywards Heath, West Sussex, before the family moved to Surrey, where she attended Oakwood School, Horley. She is the older sister of impressionist Luke Kempner. Kempner studied at the Royal Academy of Music. Her first stand-up gig was in 2009 at The Cavendish Arms. In 2010 she was named Best Newcomer at the Musical Comedy Awards.

In 2012, Kempner won the Variety Award at the Funny Women Awards at the Leicester Square Theatre. From February to March 2013, she appeared as Katisha in the Pulling Focus production of The Mikado at the Tabard Theatre in West London. She made her Edinburgh Festival Fringe debut in 2014 with the stand-up hour Defying Gravity.

At the 2018 Edinburgh Fringe, Kempner performed her sixth solo show, "Super Sonic 90s Kid". In 2018, she performed in Doodle at the Waterloo East Theatre, The World Goes Round at the Stockwell Playhouse and as David Cameron in a new musical about Brexit by Richard Thomas and Jonny Woo. She hosts the podcast Mystery on the Rocks, which began in 2019, with Chris Stokes and Masud Milas.

She played the lead in the 2023 multiplatform Doctor Who project Doom’s Day.

== Filmography ==
=== Television ===
Year	Title	Role	Notes
2021	Numberblocks	Three Times Table Ten Times Table	

=== Audio ===
Year	Title	Role	Notes
2019–present	Mystery on the Rocks	Herself	Podcast, co-host with Chris Stokes and Masud Milas
2019	Mockery Manor	Dorothy, Kelly	
2020	Kosmokrats	VAL 9000	Video game voiceover
2021	Dick Dickson in the 21st Century	Lieutenant Fox	3 episodes
2021	The Ballad of Anne and Mary	Mary Read	
2022	The Day the Earth Didn’t Die	Siobhan	
2023	Four from Doom’s Day	Doom	Doctor Who: Doom's Day (multi-media series)
2023	Dying Hours	Doom	Doctor Who: Doom's Day (multi-media series)
