= Christmas Is Coming =

Traditional rhyme

"Christmas Is Coming" is a traditional nursery rhyme and Christmas song frequently sung as a round. It is listed as number 12817 in the Roud Folk Song Index.

== Lyrics ==
The following are common representative lyrics:

Christmas is coming, the goose is getting fat
Please put a penny in the old man's hat
If you haven't got a penny, a ha'penny will do
If you haven't got a ha'penny, a farthing will do.

If you haven't got a farthing God bless you!

Although the lyrics begin appearing in print in 1885 and 1886, they are presented without an author and in a way of cataloging something that was already mostly common knowledge of the time. Some sources have variants of these lyrics and additional verses.

== Music ==
The common melody paired with the lyrics is usually simply listed as a traditional English carol, while some sources curiously list the author Edith Nesbit Bland as its composer.

Another common melody, usually listed as a traditional English carol, is differentiated by an arrangement of it made by Walford Davies, published in 1914. The lyrics have also been paired with the melody of the English dance tune "Country Gardens".

== Traditional collected versions ==
A few field recordings were made of traditional versions of the song, including one sung by Jack Elliot of Birtley, Durham to Reg Hall in the early 1960s, which is archived within the British Library Sound Archive.

== Popular recordings ==
The Kingston Trio recorded the song as "A Round About Christmas", on their 1960 album The Last Month of the Year. A loose, jazzy piano-based arrangement was featured in Vince Guaraldi's musical score for the 1965 animated television special A Charlie Brown Christmas, and a calypso-sounding version was featured in the 1979 special John Denver and the Muppets: A Christmas Together.

The rhyme also became the basis for the 1953 song "Christmas Is a-Comin'", written by Frank Luther and recorded by Bing Crosby, among others.

== See also ==
- Soul cake#Songs
