= James Hillier (actor) =

British actor and director

James Hillier (born 22 September 1973 in Kent, England) is a British actor and director. He played Sergeant Christian Young on the BBC police drama HolbyBlue, and Damian, Roxy Mitchell's fiancé, in the BBC One soap opera EastEnders. More recently, he appeared in the first and second seasons of the Netflix series The Crown, and on stage at the Royal Court Theatre in Torn.

== Life and career ==
Hillier was born in Kent to Anthony and Susan Hillier as the eldest of three boys. He studied English literature at King's College London and then went on to train at RADA from where he went straight into the prestigious BBC production of Great Expectations. His stage work includes Lulu at the Almeida, The Homecoming at The Royal Exchange, the British premiere of Tennessee Williams' Something Cloudy, Something Clear and Blue Surge by Rebecca Gilman for which he was nominated for a Best Male Performer Award. Hillier is artistic director of theatre company Defibrillator for whom he has directed Sam Shepard's A Lie of the Mind, Terry Johnson's Insignificance, The Hotel Plays and Hard Feelings. His longtime partner Amy and their two boys live in London. He is a keen sportsman and avid sports fan, following Tottenham Hotspur FC.

== Filmography ==
Year	Film	Roles	Notes
1999	Great Expectations	Bentley Drummle	TV movie
1999	An Unsuitable Job for a Woman	Dave Crawford	TV series
1999	Second Sight	Richie	TV movie
1999	Shockers: Deja Vu	Jake	TV movie
1999	All the King's Men	2nd Lt. Evelyn Beck	TV movie
1999–2000	Lucy Sullivan is getting Married	Steve	TV series
2002	Where Were We	The Couple	Short Film
2002	Long Time Dead	Spencer	Film
2002	The Inspector Lynley Mysteries	Adam Jenn	TV series
2002	The Four Feathers	Drunken Corporal	Film
2003	Serious and Organised	DC Graham Reid	TV series
2003	Silent Witness	Jeremy Adams	TV series Episode: "Beyond Guilt"
2004	Sex and Lies	Chris	TV movie
2005	Holby City	Derek Humphries	TV series
2006	Blackbeard: Terror at Sea	Gibbons	TV movie
2006	The Bill	Robert Barry	TV series
2006	Ancient Rome: The Rise and Fall of an Empire	Octavius	TV mini-series
2006	Goldplated	Keith- Golf Pro	TV series
2007	Eastenders	Damian	TV series
2007	Holby Blue	Sgt. Christian Young	TV series
2008	Survivors	Mick	TV series
2009	Fathers of Girls	Ron	Film
2010	The King's Head	Paul	Short Film
2011	London's Burning	Actor	TV movie
2012	Casualty	James Downing	TV series
2012	Fired	Dad	Short Film
2014	The Brother	Paul	Film
2016–2017	The Crown	Equerry	TV series
