= Oakwood School, Horley =

Community school in Horley, Surrey, England

Oakwood School

Location
- Balcombe Road; Horley, Surrey, England, RH6 9AE; England; 51°10′23″N 0°09′20″W

Information
- Type: Community school
- Motto: "Achieving Excellence Together"
- Religious affiliation: None
- Established: 1989
- Local authority: Surrey County Council
- Department for Education URN: 125273 Tables
- Ofsted: Reports
- Chair of Governors: Emma Jukes
- Headteacher: Adrian Cook
- Gender: co-educational
- Age: 11 to 16
- Enrolment: Approximately 1800
- Houses: 5 (Shakespeare, Newton, Austin, Nightingale and Brunel)
- Colours: Green, Grey
- Feeder to: Reigate College, East Surrey College
- Website: www.oakwood.surrey.sch.uk

Oakwood School is a community secondary school located in Horley, Surrey, England. It is co-educational and caters for students in the 11–16 age range, as it has no sixth form. It has approximately 1800 students, and as it is the only secondary school in Horley, it is expected to grow further in size.

== History ==
Oakwood was opened in 1989 following the merger of Court Lodge Comprehensive (shut down on 31 August 1989) and Horley Comprehensive (Secondary Modern) School.

Its Headteachers have been:

- Andy Thompson: 1989 - 2007
- Sue Child: 2007 - 2015
- Simon Potten: 2015 - 2023
- Jon Gladstone: 2023–2026
- Adrian Cook: 2026 - present

== Ofsted ==
It is currently rated needs attention as of February 2026.

== Facilities ==
The school has a sports centre called Oakwood Sports Centre, with a range of halls for different activities, as well as a fitness gym. It also has a full size astroturf football pitch, as well as 2 five-a-side astroturf pitches as well. The new Andy Thompson Wing was also recently built to accommodate the growing number of students enrolled in the school.

The school also hosts the Horley detachment of the Army Cadet Force.

== Extended confederation ==
Oakwood is a founder member of the Horley Learning Partnership, an extended confederation which incorporates the Horley SureStart Children’s Centre.

== Notable alumni ==
- Guntur Dwiarmein, Taekwondo's youngest ever UK Champion
- Robert Emms, actor
- Suzanna Kempner, stand-up comedian
- Faye White, former captain of England women's national football team
