= Chloe Howman =

English actress

- Born: 1978 (age 47–48); London, England
- Education: LAMDA
- Years active: 1986, 1996–present
- Spouse(s): Danny Hodkinson (m. 1999; div. 2002); Paul Thornley (m. 2013; div. 2017)
- Father: Karl Howman

Chloe Howman (born 1978) is an English actress. She is the daughter of actor Karl Howman.

== Career ==
Howman's first appearance was in 1986 alongside her sister, Katy-Jo, as children in their father's series Brush Strokes. After training at LAMDA, Howman's adult roles started in 1997 in the soap opera Family Affairs as Julie-Ann Jones, daughter of Pete Callan. She later appeared as Tara in Hollyoaks: Movin' On, and as Helen in the series Life Begins and Making Waves. She later appeared in HolbyBlue in a leading role.

Howman appeared in the BBC medical drama, Casualty as staff nurse, Rita Freeman. Howman made her first appearance on 10 August 2013 and chose to leave the show in 2016, after nearly three years, her final scenes aired on 16 July 2016.

== Personal life ==
Howman married Danny Hodkinson in 1999 and they have one child. Howman was married to actor Paul Thornley from 2013 until 2017. The couple have one child.

== Filmography ==
Year	Film	Role	Notes
1986	Brush Strokes	Girl at Dance Class/Jacko's Niece	2 episodes
1996	Jack and Jeremy's Real Lives		Episode: "Restaurateurs"
1998	Kiss Me Kate	Applicant	Episode: "Secretaries"
1999–2000	Family Affairs	Julie-Ann Jones	Regular role
2000	A Christmas Carol	Jane	Television film
2000	Doctors	Marina Taylor	Episode: "Judgement Day"
2001	Hollyoaks: Movin' On	Tara	
2002	The Estate Agents	Jane	Recurring role
2002	Me & Mrs Jones	Heather	TV movie
2003	40	Angela	Main role
2003	Sparkling Cyanide	Iris Marie	Television film
2003	The Bill	Julia	Episode: "A Match Made in Hell"
2004	Making Waves	Teresa Fellows	2 episodes
2004–2006	Life Begins	Helen	Main role
2005	The Golden Hour	PC Rowena Banks	2 episodes
2005	The Ghost Squad	Kay	1 episode
2005	Doctors	Andrea Lane	Episode: "The Truth of the Matter"
2007	Double Time	Cassie Page	Television film
2007–2008	HolbyBlue	PC Kelly Cooper	Main role
2008	Mutual Friends	Julia	1 episode
2009	Fathers of Girls	Emma Salerno	Film role
2010	Doctors	Emma Mooreland	Episode: "Dirty Little Pig"
2010	The Bill	Carol Clark	Episode: "Held Responsible"
2010	New Tricks	Eve Aspinall	Episode: "Gloves Off"
2010	Casualty	Anna Portman	Episode: "A Better Past"
2012	Metamorphosis	Anna	Film role
2012	Casualty	Leanna Forrester	2 episodes
2013	Noble Cause Corruption	DI Maxine Boyd (voice)	Radio role
2013–2016	Casualty	Rita Freeman	Main role
2017	Father Brown	Lucy Lesser	Episode: "The Smallest of Things"
2020	Doctors	Lou Tripper	Episode: "Unnatural Selection"
