= James Thornton (actor) =

British actor (born 1975)

- Born: 31 October 1975 (age 51); Bradford, West Yorkshire, England
- Occupation: Actor
- Years active: 1995–present
- Spouse: Joanna Page (m. 2003)
- Children: 4

James Thornton (born 31 October 1975) is an English actor. He portrayed John Barton in the British soap opera Emmerdale from 2009 to 2012; he previously appeared in the show in 1995.

== Personal life ==
Thornton married Welsh actress Joanna Page in December 2003. They have four children.

Four years before their marriage, they both appeared in the BBC adaptation of the Charles Dickens novel David Copperfield; he as Ham Peggotty, she as Dora Spenlow.

On 13 February 2010 Thornton was hit by a motorist in London and received medical treatment for leg injuries. Emmerdale producers rewrote scenes involving Thornton's character.

== Selected filmography ==
- 1995: Emmerdale
- 1998: Among Giants
- 1999: The Lakes
- 1999: David Copperfield
- 2000: Playing the Field
- 2001, 2003–2004: Red Cap
- 2003: Between the Sheets
- 2005: No Angels
- 2006: Dalziel and Pascoe "A Death in the Family" as Hugh Shadwell
- 2007: Holby City - Series 9
- 2008: HolbyBlue
- 2009–2012: Emmerdale
- 2014: Stella

== Other credits ==
Thornton has narrated several documentaries including Take Me to the Edge (2008) and The Curse of Oak Island for UK audiences. He has also made appearances on Loose Women (2009–2012) and Let's Dance for Comic Relief (2011). He has narrated and appeared in the documentary, Benefits By the Sea : Jaywick (2015–2016) and also narrated the documentary series "The Motorway" shown on Channel 5 in the UK. He has been the voice of Talk TV.

== Awards and nominations ==
Year	Award	Category	Result	Ref.
2010	British Soap Awards	Sexiest Male	Nominated	
2010	TV Choice Awards	Best Soap Newcomer	Nominated	
2011	British Soap Awards	Sexiest Male	Nominated	
2012	British Soap Awards	Best Exit	Nominated	

Preceded by Rufus Hound	Winner of Let's Dance for Comic Relief; 2011	Succeeded by Rowland Rivron
