= Cal MacAninch =

Scottish actor

- Born: Calum Andrew Colquhoun MacAninch; 24 November 1963 (age 62); Govan, Glasgow, Scotland
- Occupation: Actor
- Years active: 1989–present
- Spouse: Shauna Macdonald

Cal MacAninch (born 24 November 1963) is a Scottish actor, who is known for portraying the character of DI John Keenan in police drama HolbyBlue on BBC One from 2007 to 2008. Other notable appearances include his roles as Mr Thackeray in the ITV period drama Mr Selfridge, and Henry Lang in Downton Abbey, but he has played many leading roles in British television and film over the past thirty years.

== Biography ==
MacAninch played Rowan Collins in Series 4 of the ITV drama series Wild at Heart. He returned to the show for its fifth series as a main cast member. He also played Tauren, a sorcerer, in the BBC television series Merlin in the episode "To Kill the King". He starred in the 2001 BBC miniseries The Best of Both Worlds with Alice Evans. He appeared as Henry Lang, a valet, in the second series of Downton Abbey.

== Personal life ==
MacAninch and his wife, actress Shauna Macdonald, have three daughters and live in the Portobello district of Edinburgh. MacAninch is a keen marathon runner.

== Radio ==
Date	Title	Role	Director	Station
23 April 2004	The Lights	Liam	Toby Swift	BBC Radio 4 Friday Play
11 June 2004	Soft Fall the Sounds of Eden	Andy	Gaynor Macfarlane	BBC Radio 4 Friday Play
11 July 2004	How Many Miles to Basra?		Toby Swift	BBC Radio 3 Drama on 3
6 November 2005	The Gunpowder Plot	King James I	David Hunter	BBC Radio 3 Drama on 3
31 October 2011 – 4 November 2011	The Pillow Book (series 4)	Yukinari	Lu Kemp	BBC Radio 4 Woman's Hour Drama
30 September 2013 – 3 October 2013	The Blackhouse	DI Fin Macleod	Kirsteen Cameron	BBC Radio Scotland
1 June 2018	The Poet and the Echo: Grey Evening	Reader	Gaynor Macfarlane	BBC Radio 4
28 January 2019 – 1 February 2019	Silence	Erling Kagge	Eilidh McCreadie	BBC Radio 4 Book of the Week

== Television ==
Television
Year	Title	Role	Notes
1990	Taggart	Heckler	Episode: "Hostile Witness"
1990	The Paradise Club	Angel Eyes	Episode: "Chinese Whispers"
1991	The Advocates	Milligan	3 episodes
1991	Screen One	Axle	Episode: "Alive and Kicking"
1991	The Chestnut Soldier	Evan Llyr	TV miniseries
1993‍–‍1994	The Riff Raff Element	Declan	TV series: main cast
1995	A Mind to Murder	Philip Tippett	TV film
1995	The Big One	Jeff	TV film
1995	Dangerous Lady	Geoff Ryan	TV miniseries
1995	Screen Two	Tom Kelso	Episode: "Nervous Energy"
1996	Taggart	Dr David Argylle	Episode: "Devil's Advocate"
1998	Cooking Pigeons		TV film
1999	The Ruth Rendell Mysteries	Finn	Episode: "The Lake of Darkness"
1999	Warriors	Sgt Andre Sochanik	TV serial
2000	Little Bird	Tony O'Neill	TV film
2001	Best of Both Worlds	Mark Landucci	3 episodes
2001	Waking the Dead	Alex Bryson/Sam Keel	Episode: "A Simple Sacrifice"
2002‍–‍2003	Rockface	Ben Craig	TV series: main cast
2003	Silent Witness	Michael Patterson	Episode: "Fatal Error"
2004	Murphy's Law	DS Nic Winters	Episode: "Bent Moon on the Rise"
2005	The Ghost Squad	Mike	Episode: "Hardcore"
2006	Sorted	Radge	TV series: main cast
2007‍–‍2008	HolbyBlue	DI John Keenan	TV series: main cast
2008	Merlin	Tauren	Episode: "To Kill the King"
2009‍–‍2010	Wild at Heart	Rowan Collins	
2010	Strike Back	Major Chris Pemberton	Episode: "Iraq: Part One"
2011	Downton Abbey	Henry Lang	Episodes: "Matthew's Return" and "General Sir Herbert Strutt"
2011	Garrow's Law	Richard Lucas	1 episode
2013	Midsomer Murders	Alan Robson	Episode: "The Sicilian Defence"
2013	Silent Witness	David Loader	Episode: "Legacy"
2014‍–‍2015	Mr Selfridge	Mr Thackeray	11 episodes
2015	Banished	Sergeant Timmins	TV serial
2015	DCI Banks	Detective Sergeant Martin Heston	Episode: "Ghosts"
2015	Katie Morag	Mr Cavendish	Episode: "Katie Morag and the Worst Day Ever"
2016	Scott & Bailey	Craig Widnes	Episodes: "Nobody's Fool" and "Change"
2018	Frontier	Angus	Season 3
2019	The Victim	Christian Graham	TV miniseries
2019	The Small Hand	Hugo Snow	TV film
2020	Father Brown	George Oakley	Episode: "The Tower of Lost Souls"
2020	Vera	Thomas Walden	Episode: "Parent Not Expected"
2020	Des	Neil Sinclair	TV Mini-Series: 2 episodes
2021	Time	PO Galbraith	3 episodes
2021	Vigil	Ben Oakley	TV serial
2022	Trigger Point	Inspector Lee Robins	6 episodes
2022	The Essex Serpent	Michael Seaborne	Episode: "The Blackwater"
2022	Mayflies	Tibbs	

== Film ==
Film
Year	Title	Role	Notes
1993	Splitting Heirs	CID Officer	
1997	The Woodlanders	Dr. Fitzpiers	
1998	Speak Like a Child	Billy, Age 30	
1998	Sentimental Education	August	
1999	The Lost Son	Martin	
2000	Best	Paddy	
2000	Breathtaking	Mick Wilmott	
2001	The Point Men	Horst	
2004	Dear Frankie	Davey	
2005	Rag Tale	Paul (Mac) MacAvoy, Sports Editor	
2007	Jetsam	Jack	
2011	Screwed	Eddie	
2018	Calibre	Al McClay	
2019	Intrigo: Dear Agnes	Erich Neumann-Hansen	
2019	Intrigo: Samaria	Erich Neumann-Hansen	
2020	The Reckoning	Ben Tuttle	
2021	Nobody Has to Know	Peter	

== Theatre ==
Date	Title	Role	Director	Company / Theatre
–	Macbeth	Macbeth	Colin Ellwood	Unnatural Acts Theatre
–	How Like An Angel	Peter	Alan Sharpe	Traverse Theatre, Edinburgh
–	Tis Pity She's A Whore	Grimaldi	Philip Prowse	Citizens Theatre, Glasgow
–	Frankenstein	Walton/Clerval	Jon Pope	Citizens Theatre, Glasgow
1992 –	Not About Heroes	Wilfred Owen	Stephen MacDonald	Heroes Theatre Company
–	The Cherry Orchard	The Passer By	Robert Robertson	Dundee Repertory Theatre
–	The Philanthropist	John	Neil Murray	Dundee Repertory Theatre
–	A Tale of Two Cities	Defence	Philip Prowse	Citizens Theatre, Glasgow
–	Enrico Four	Arialdo	Philip Prowse	Citizens Theatre, Glasgow
16 March 1994 – 26 March 1994	Oedipus Rex	Oedipus	Claire Venables	Citizens Theatre, Glasgow
27 September 1996 – 19 October 1996	Hamlet	Hamlet	Philip Prowse	Citizens Theatre, Glasgow
19 June 1997 – Oct 1997	The Wood Demon	Wood Demon	Anthony Clarke	Playhouse Theatre, London
–	A Whistle in the Dark	Harry Carney	Roxana Silbert	Citizens Theatre, Glasgow
20 July 2006 – 12 August 2006	Under the Black Flag	John Silver	Roxana Silbert	Shakespeare's Globe
–	The Bacchae	Pentheus	John Tiffany	National Theatre of Scotland; Lincoln Center, New York
–	Peter Pan	Captain Hook	John Tiffany	National Theatre of Scotland
–	Wee Andy	The Surgeon	Paddy Cuneen	Òran Mór, Glasgow
–	Anna Karenina	Vronsky	Nancy Meckler	Shared Experience
–	King Lear	Duke of Cornwall	Dominic Hill	Citizens Theatre, Glasgow
2 March 2012 – 24 March 2012	Betrayal	Robert	Dominic Hill	Citizens Theatre, Glasgow
6 September 2012 – 13 October 2012	The Judas Kiss	Robbie Ross	Neil Armfield	Hampstead Theatre
15 October 2012 – 20 October 2012	The Judas Kiss	Robbie Ross	Neil Armfield	Gaiety Theatre, Dublin
22 October 2012 – 27 October 2012	The Judas Kiss	Robbie Ross	Neil Armfield	Theatre Royal Bath
29 October 2012 – 3 November 2012	The Judas Kiss	Robbie Ross	Neil Armfield	Richmond Theatre
5 November 2012 – 10 November	The Judas Kiss	Robbie Ross	Neil Armfield	Theatre Royal, Brighton
12 November 2012 – 17 November 2012	The Judas Kiss	Robbie Ross	Neil Armfield	Cambridge Arts Theatre
9 January 2013 – 6 April 2013	The Judas Kiss	Robbie Ross	Neil Armfield	Duke of York's Theatre, London
22 March 2016 – 1 May 2016	The Judas Kiss	Robbie Ross	Neil Armfield	Ed Mirvish Theatre, Toronto
11 May 2016 – 12 June 2016	The Judas Kiss	Robbie Ross	Neil Armfield	Brooklyn Academy of Music, New York
2015	My Eyes Went Dark	Nikolai Koslov	Matt Wilkinson	Finborough Theatre, London
2016	My Eyes Went Dark	Nikolai Koslov	Matt Wilkinson	Traverse Theatre, Edinburgh
2017	My Eyes Went Dark	Nikolai Koslov	Matt Wilkinson	59E59 Theaters, New York
2019 –	The Mistress Contract		Eve Nicol	Tron Theatre, Glasgow
