= Joe Jacobs (actor) =

English actor

Joe Jacobs (m. 1983) is an English actor. Jacobs has appeared in Prime Suspect series 5 as Campbell Lafferty, The Bill, Holby City and is best known for his role as PC Billy Jackson in the BBC police drama HolbyBlue.

The son of actor Clarke Peters, and grandson of broadcaster David Jacobs, he was in Night & Day (2001), The Lives of the Saints (2006), and The Commander.
