= Lu Kemp =

British theatre director and dramaturge

Lu Kemp is a theatre director and dramaturge.

== Education and training ==
She trained on the Laboratory of Movement course at L'École Internationale de Théâtre Jacques Lecoq, Paris, and with Anne Bogart’s Saratoga International Theater Institute in New York. In March 2016, she was appointed as Artistic Director of Perth Theatre in Scotland.

== Credits ==
=== Theatre ===
Original run	Title	Author	Cast	Synopsis	Production company	Notes	Ref.
28 January 2003 – 15 February 2003	How to Tell the Truth	Chris Dunkley	Philip Ralph, Damien Goodwin and Daniele Lydon	A story about life behind the headlines	Stephen Joseph Theatre		
20 November 2005 – 11 December 2005	Almost Blue	Carlo Lucarelli adapted by Chris Dunkley	Benjamin Duke and Eddie Kay	Simon, is blind and suffers from synaesthesia, through which he experiences sound as colours. Alone in his room he surfs the airwaves with his audio-scanner, through which he follows the trail of a murderer with a cold, green voice.	Riverside Studios, Hammersmith	Winner: Oxford Samuel Beckett Theatre Trust Award 2005	
2006 – 2006	Beautiful Cosmos	Rob Evans, Lu Kemp, Ben Lewis and Sophie Fletcher		Beautiful Cosmos is set in the apartment of a woman who suddenly finds herself alone. Through her job as a sex text messager she begins to pick up strange messages from truckers, astronauts and a teenage Arizonan boy. Through it all she can't stop hearing the words and remembering the movements of her lover.	Theatre by Design / Tron Theatre, Glasgow		
5 December 2006 – 13 January 2007	Pinocchio	Rob Evans	Ben Lewis		Royal Theatre, Northampton		
18 August 2009 – 30 August 2009	If That's All There Is		Lucinka Eisler, Giulia Innocenti and Ben Lewis	A surreal, comic look at the strain of organising a wedding, how much we're prepared to endure to find love and happiness, and whether we can ever really know one another.	Inspector Sands Traverse Theatre, Edinburgh	Winner Edinburgh International Festival Fringe Award 2009 Touring: Michael Croft Theatre, Alleyn's School (1 March 2010); PATS Dance Studio, University of Surrey (20 October 2010); Nine Theatre, TNT, Beijing (10–14 November 2010);	
13 October 2009 – 17 October 2009	One Thousand Paper Cranes	Abigail Docherty	Veronica Leer and Melody Grove	The true story of two fun-loving Japanese girls who tried to change their destiny by folding pieces of paper. Sadoko and her best friend Chiziko were just two years old when an atomic bomb was dropped on their home town, Hiroshima. Ten years on, a once energetic Sadoko is dying of radiation poisoning and Chiziko is desperate to save her.	Tron Theatre, Glasgow		
4 May 2010 – 8 May 2010	Julia Innocenti and Rosalind Sydney	Eastwood Park Theatre, Glasgow					
11 May 2010 – 16 May 2010	Imaginate Festival, Church Hill Theatre Studio, Edinburgh						
4 August 2011 – 29 August 2011	Assembly George Square, Edinburgh						
30 April 2010	The Next of It	John McCann		A black comedy, set in County Armagh, about family secrets and the legacy of silence. An old blind woman is digging her grave. She enlists her teenage granddaughter to dig with her, to the disgust of the girl's mother who bans the girl from returning. However, the girl does go back the following day to help her grandmother and in so doing, learns the secret which has driven the family apart with silence and reproaches for as long as she can remember.	Stellar Quines / Traverse Theatre, Edinburgh		
18 May 2010 – 22 May 2010	Room	Abigail Docherty	Melody Grove	Sarah never leaves her flat. Watching the world outside from her window, she dreams up fantastic experiences and adventures without stepping outside her front door. But today a stranger has come to visit her and he is determined to pull her into the real world again. Sarah, however refuses to leave...	Tron Theatre, Glasgow		
15 July 2010 – 18 July 2010	The 13 Midnight Challenges of Angelus Diablo	Carl Grose	John Nicholson, Sandy Grierson, Dominic Lawton and Julia Innocenti	A hilarious tale of an unsuccessful actor who sells his soul to the devil in return for an acting part.	Royal Shakespeare Company at Latitude Festival		
29 July 2011 – 30 July 2011	Encourage the Others	John Donnelly	Grace Adewale, Stephanie Afari, Alexander Austin, Akuc Bol, Caitlin Fitzgerald, Isabelle Holland, Dina Ibrahim, Russie Miessi, Renais Mejeh, Liah Tecle, Josie Roughneen, Joey Jarossi, Maia Clarke and Cedric Belato		Almeida Theatre		
22 October - 11 November 2014	Bondagers	Sue Glover	Cath Whitefield, Pauline Lockhart, Wendy Seager, Jayd Johnson, Charlene Boyd, Nora Wardell	A tale of female bonded farm labourers in the Scottish Borders.	Lyceum Theatre, Edinburgh		

=== Radio plays ===
Date of first broadcast	Play	Author	Cast	Synopsis	Station	Ref.
14 January 2003	A Rose for Chopin	Lorraine McCann	Richard Greenwood, Michael Perceval Maxwell, Noreen Leighton, Vivienne Dixon and Michael MacKenzie	Devastated after his split from George Sand, Chopin visits Scotland. Escape from Parisian gossip is welcome, but the attention of the locals is not.	BBC Radio 4 Afternoon Play	
17 March 2003	Little Black Dress: What to Wear in the Absence of Light	Hannah McGill	Read by Jo James	Camilla opens her eyes to find she has not, as she has hoped, achieved eternal peace, but rather appears to have landed in her very own personalised hell – the parental home.	BBC Radio 4 Book of the Week	
18 March 2003	Little Black Dress: The Difference	Sian Preece	Read by Aled Pugh	Mark's band are given a shot at fame, and his younger sister is on hand to create their look.	BBC Radio 4 Book of the Week	
19 March 2003	Little Black Dress: Alma Martyr	Susie Maguire	Read by Susie Maguire	Radiating success, Midge wants to give her old friends a day out to remember. They deserve it.	BBC Radio 4 Book of the Week	
20 March 2003	Little Black Dress: Dancing in the Dark	Rosemary Goring	Read by James MacPherson	Helen is surprised by the effect a little black dress has on her normally inattentive husband.	BBC Radio 4 Book of the Week	
21 March 2003	Little Black Dress: Les Pompes Funèbres	Susie Maguire	Read by Gayanne Potter	Kate has been prepared for the death of her father, but not for his dying in France. How does one display grief in a foreign language?	BBC Radio 4 Book of the Week	
31 March 2003	The Life Trainer	Sophie McCook	Julie Austin, Carol Ann Crawford, Janette Fogo, Steven McNicoll, Jenny Ryan and Nick Underwood	Kelly is staring down the barrel of her thirtieth birthday. Life is making her panic. If only she could do it all again, she'd make the right choices, especially in love. When Kelly meets Faith, a personal Life Trainer, Faith offers her the opportunity to redo the bits she got wrong the first time around. Given the chance - would you?	BBC Radio 4 Afternoon Play	
3 July 2003	The Chronycle	John Hancox	Juliet Cadzow, Alec Heggie, Irene MacDougall, Keith MacPherson and Clare Yuille	In the final years of his life, Charles Rennie Mackintosh was living in obscurity in France with his wife Margaret MacDonald. As Mackintosh rediscovered the joy of painting, Margaret, also an artist, was trying to come to terms with the tragic loss of her sister, Frances.	BBC Radio 4 Afternoon Play	
8 December 2003 – 19 December 2003	One Man's Justice	Akira Yoshimura	Read by Nicholas Farrell	The Potsdam Agreement, which was signed the previous August, bought the war to an end and humiliation and economic depression to Japan. Having received a cryptic message from an ex-colleague, Takuya Kiyohara is compelled to return to his former headquarters to receive instructions.	BBC Radio 4 Book at Bedtime	
8 January 2004	Bampot Central	Christopher Brookmyre	Douglas Henshall, David Begg, Richard Gordon, Murdo MacLeod, Sheila Donald, Monica Gibb, John Paul Hurley, Tony Kearney, Steven McNicoll, Michael Moreland, Gayanne Potter and Paul Young	It's the Edinburgh Fringe, not Parlabane's favourite time of year. To add insult to injury, Parlabane has just walked into one of the worst conceived armed robberies he's ever had the pleasure to attend. Tommy and Jyzer appear to have been set up, not that they are aware of that fact. Holding up a Post Office in order to lay their hands on that mythical creature The Insurance Bond has to be their least smart move to date. But they can still make a few more along the way.	BBC Radio 3 The Wire	
27 February 2004	Different Planes	Tamsin Oglesby	Charles Edwards, Teresa Gallagher, Mike Harris, Togo Igawa, Karl Johnson, Eiji Kusuhara, Sarah Lam and Matthew Marsh	Within days of each other two planes crash: one into the Mogami River in Japan, the other into a field of American poppies. Behind the press conferences and public enquiries, the two heads of the airlines attempt to reconcile their public responsibilities with the private lives of their families.	BBC Radio 4 Friday Play	
29 March 2004	Nude, Untitled	Gowan Calder	Steven Cartwright, Julie Duncanson, Kath Howden, Tony Kearney, Vicki Liddelle and Jenny Ryan	When the art college threatens to close down sections of its drawing and painting school – in favour of more economically viable departments – the life models' jobs come under threat. Someone has to take a stand. And if it's in the buff, so be it.	BBC Radio 4 Afternoon Play	
13 May 2004	The Cenci Family	Lizzie Hopley	Sally Hawkins, Peter Innes, Owen Teale, Gerrard McArthur, Daniel Evans and Ronald Pickup	Rome, 1599. A young girl, Beatrice Cenci, stands trial for the murder of her father Francesco Cenci, the first Godfather of the Italian Mafia. Nominated for a Sony Radio Academy Award	BBC Radio 4 Afternoon Play	
24 May 2004	15 Minutes to Go: Beautiful Day	Anne Donovan	Gabriel Quigley, William Barlow, Alexandra Mathie and Chris Young	A woman finds herself stuck in a traffic jam in the Clyde Tunnel. Nothing unusual in that – until God intervenes to tell her she's only got fifteen minutes to live.	BBC Radio 4 Woman's Hour Drama	
25 May 2004	15 Minutes to Go: Viper in the Nest	Hannah McGill	Gabriel Quigley, Crawford Logan, Grant O'Rourke, Alexandra Mathie and William Barlow	Within the next fifteen minutes the verdict on the trial of a young American girl is about to be announced. In a prestigious boarding school in Scotland, Martin is desperate to hear the outcome – his own fate he feels is inextricably bound up with hers.	BBC Radio 4 Woman's Hour Drama	
2 June 2004	Visiting Time	Aileen Ritchie	Louise Goodall, Eileen McCallum, Colette O'Neil, Wendy Seager, Simon Tait and Jimmy Yuill	Darkly comic observational drama about the tentative friendship between two middle-aged carers who meet in hospital while visiting their elderly mothers.	BBC Radio 4 Afternoon Play	
7 June 2004 – 18 June 2004	The Rainbow	D.H. Lawrence abridged by Linda Cracknell		The Rainbow explores the passionate lives of three generations of the Brangwen family of Nottinghamshire from the 1840s to the early years of the twentieth century.	BBC Radio 4 Book at Bedtime	
21 June 2004 – 25 June 2004	The Trading Game	Lorraine McCann	Donald Cameron, Lisa Gardner, Tamara Kennedy, John Kielty, Steven Cartwright, Emma Currie, John Shedden, William Barlow, Sheila Donald and Greg Powrie	LETS is a system of bartering which operates in towns and cities across Britain. These five comic dramas are inspired by a series of trades between strangers.	BBC Radio 4 Woman's Hour Drama	
27 June 2004	Uncle Varick	John Byrne	Paul Young, Sandy Neilson, Richard Greenwood, Robert Jack, Vicki Masson, Selina Boyack, Sheila Donald, John Shedden and Anne Lacey	In the mid-sixties Uncle Varick and his niece Shona have been running the estate, farm and the brewery in the remote North East of Scotland for the benefit of Varick's brother-in-law, the literary critic and TV pundit Sandy Sheridan. When Sandy decides to retire to the estate with his young wife Elaine, their presence throws the lives of the inhabitants into disarray. Uncle Varick is desperate having, he believes, surrendered his chance at life and love for the benefit of a man he now knows to be a charlatan	BBC Radio 3 Drama on 3	
12 July 2004 – 16 July 2004	Selected Stories by Isaac Bashevis Singer	Isaac Bashevis Singer	Read by Henry Goodman	A week of short stories by the master Yiddish storyteller, to mark the 100th anniversary of his birth: The Re-encounter; A Quotation from Klopstock; Taibele and her Demon; Neighbours; and The Bird.	BBC Radio 4 Afternoon Reading	
14 July 2004	Are You Sure?	Alexis Zegerman	Susan Engel, Teresa Gallagher and Karl Johnson	In his declining years, Yiddish writer Isaac Bashevis Singer is approached by a young girl, Deborah, who wishes to drive him to his lectures at the university in exchange for attending his course free of charge. Her boldness pays off and the two embark on a robust and intimate relationship.	BBC Radio 4 Afternoon Play	
6 September 2004	The Big Sneeze: Sneeze on Monday, Sneeze for Danger	Val McDermid		Someone on the inside is covering Greg Thomas's back. The local drugs baron has been charged numerous times but somehow he never gets brought to book. And it's Chrissie's job to find out who's reaping the rewards. Listening in to Thomas's apartment one night, Chrissie hears nothing remarkable except for a violent sneezing fit. In the morning Thomas is found dead.	BBC Radio 4 Afternoon Reading	
7 September 2004	The Big Sneeze: Sneeze on Tuesday, Kiss a Stranger	Tim Crouch		Until the age of 29 Tim was blind. When he was a baby a small sycamore seed twirled its way down to his cot in the garden, he clutched it and shoved it up his tiny nostrils where the seed lodged itself – between his anterior of his brain and the optic nerve – for 29 years. And nobody knew it was there. This is the seeds story.	BBC Radio 4 Afternoon Reading	
8 September 2004	The Big Sneeze: Sneeze on Wednesday, Get a Letter	Linda Cracknell		Having received a photo of his grandson George sits down to write a letter to his son. A letter he imagines that might bridge the gap of years between them.	BBC Radio 4 Afternoon Reading	
9 September 2004	The Big Sneeze: Sneeze on Thursday, Something Better	Hannah McGill		Gwendoline the puppy is sick. There is no doubt about it. She's sneezing blood on the studio floor. There's only one thing for it: a new puppy must be found, and the producers just have to hope that the children won't notice.	BBC Radio 4 Afternoon Reading	
10 September 2004	The Big Sneeze: Sneeze on Friday, Sneeze for Sorrow, See Your Sweetheart Tomorrow	Ruth Thomas	Read by Catherine Shepherd	Landing a Saturday job in the local pet shop will finally allow Linda to get close to Mark Brown. If she lands it. She can't seem to get through the interview for sneezing. Is it the cuttlefish she's allergic to? The parakeets? Or is it something that is going to make their relationship even more unfeasible than it already is?	BBC Radio 4 Afternoon Reading	
20 November 2004	Dr Korczak's Example	David Greig	Alexander Morton, Vicki Liddelle, Simon Donaldson, Sandy Neilson, Anthony Hutcheson, Matthew Zajac, Ewan Macleod, Fergus Hitchcock, Finn Hitchcock, Katie Neville and Sarah-Beth Neville	Based on the true story of Janusz Korczak, best-selling children's novelist, paediatrician and social experimenter, who set up a Jewish orphanage in Warsaw and ran it as a children's democracy. In this play, when the Nazis close in on Warsaw, Korczak and the children are forced to move into the ghetto – stretching Korczak's pacifist ideals to the limit. But the doctor's values are threatened not only by the Nazi regime but by the arrival of a young Jewish boy who believes in fighting back.	BBC Radio 4 Saturday Play	
29 November 2004	Double Acts: Scissors and Ribbon Repeated as The Mecklington Miracle	Hannah McGill and Rachel McGill	Martin Hyder, Andrew Mayer, David Sant, Christine Bottomley and Charlie Hayes	Big conspiracy comes to a small town in this light-hearted comedy. The town's local hero hasn't stepped out of her house for years until Pedro arrives from Columbia determined to make a miracle happen in Mecklington.	BBC Radio 4 Afternoon Play	
17 December 2004	The Stranger at the Palazzo D'Oro	Paul Theroux	Robert Jack, Angus Macinnes, Finlay Welsh, Vivienne Dixon, Lesley Hart and Frances Thorburn	A dark, seductive tale of ambition and desire set in Taormina, Sicily. Aged 60, successful, American painter Gilford Mariner returns to the Golden Hotel, a place he has not visited since he was a young man of twenty. Back then, he was enchanted by DH Lawrence's poem Snake, and willing to take dangerous risks.	BBC Radio 4 Afternoon Play	
3 March 2005	The Tragical Comedy or Comical Tragedy of Mr. Punch	Neil Gaiman and Dave McKean, adapted by Neil Gaiman; Music by Dave McKean and Ashley Slater	Richard Dillane, Alexander Morton, Hugh Dickson, Karl Johnson, Jonathan Bee, Rachel Atkins, Susan Jameson, Stuart McLoughlin, Geoff Felix and Frankie Dean	A small boy goes to stay with his grandparents in Southsea, spending his days at his grandfather's failed arcade on the seafront. When Swatchell, a Punch and Judy professor, sets up his booth in the arcade the boy becomes fascinated by the story played out by these strange violent wooden puppets – particularly when strange parallels start to develop between the story of Mr. Punch and events in his own family's life.	BBC Radio 3 The Wire	
26 March 2005	The Distant Echo	Val McDermid dramatised for radio by Bert Coules	Jimmy Chisholm, Steven Cartwright, Simon Donaldson, Matthew Pidgeon, John Paul Hurley, Kirsten Murray, Claire Knight, Gayanne Potter, Crawford Logan and Michael Nardone	Four students stumble upon the body of a dead girl, in the snow, late one night. Twenty-five years later the police mount a cold case review of the unsolved case, and the friends finally have an opportunity to clear their names once and for all. However, when one of them dies in a suspicious house fire, and another in a burglary gone bad, it seems someone is still pursuing their own brand of justice. If the remaining two are to avoid becoming the next victims they need to find out what really happened all those years ago.	BBC Radio 4 Saturday Play	
15 June 2005	The All-Colour Vegetarian Cookbook	Chris Dunkley	Chris Moran, Katherine Igoe, Marcella Riordan, Dominic Cooper, Kate Colgrove Pope, Natasha Pyne and Karl Johnson	Jez, a socially incompetent clerk, has an antagonistic relationship with the woman in the next door office. On discovering her dead at her desk, he thinks that the cleaners, or IT, or someone, anyone else, will find her and.. deal with it. They don't.	BBC Radio 4 Afternoon Play	
14 July 2005	The Best Snow for Skiing	Linda Cracknell	Iain Robertson and Colette O'Neil	It is 1978 and Valda Trevlyn Grieve, the second wife of the great Scottish poet Hugh MacDiarmid, is reassessing her life following her husband's death. A young student arrives at her door during a snow storm determined to pay his respects his deceased hero's memory. Valda, irritated by the youngster's intrusion and pious reverence, does her best to shatter his illusions.	BBC Radio 4 Afternoon Play	
24 August 2005	Genesis	Kate Atkinson (inspired by Genesis)	Read by Joanna Tope	God is the ultimate showman, parading the best of his tricks for the celestial auditorium. He creates a world between his hands, and dazzles his audience with a display of every shape and size of creature he can imagine. All is more or less going according to plan, until God pulls out his greatest creation yet – man.	BBC Radio 4	
2 September 2005	The Receptionist	Ali Smith	John Paul Hurley, Claire Knight, Candida Benson, Jimmy Chisholm, Joanna Tope, Gabriel Quigley and Mark McDonnell	Radio Play is a programme that plays in Colin's head. It's a particularly interesting programme about the history of the mouth organ. When Colin meets Beth, the new receptionist at the doctor's surgery, she seems to be able to hear Colin's radio programme too. The problem is Beth doesn't hear quite the same things as he does. She's quite certain the programme is about the balalaika. Is this, as Doctor Proctor suspects, an extraordinary phenomenon in modern psychology or is there something more universal at work?	BBC Radio 4	
12 September 2005	15 Minutes that Changed the World: Amo, Amas, Amat	Louise Ironside	Gareth Thomas, Crawford Logan, Anne Lacey and Nick Underwood	In 1884, the Vatican granted a special dispensation which allowed two cousins from Linz to marry. That dispensation changed the course of European history. This fictional tale imagines what led the cardinal who signed the papers that day to make that decision.	BBC Radio 4 Woman's Hour Drama	
19 September 2005	The Sundowner	Aileen Ritchie	Una McLean, Manu Kurewa, Chris Young, Lesley Hart and Wendy Seager	Following a suspected stroke, Betty finds herself condemned to live out the rest of her days in the least appealing possible way. So she fights. Care-worker Farai is charged with softening her up. Slowly he begins to win Betty's confidence but just as he thinks he's getting there he finds Betty has other cards up her sleeve.	BBC Radio 4 Afternoon Play	
9 December 2005	The Elizabethan Beauty Law	Lizzie Hopley	Annette Badland, Amanda Root, Tom Burke, John Rowe, Alan Cox, Lisa Moore and Toby Longworth	England 1587, a year before the Spanish Armada. Due to a need to curb Spanish influence in the country and control the escalating trend in female adornment, a new Beauty Law has been introduced. Under this law, any woman who traps a man of the realm into marriage via sorcery of self-embellishment will be tried under the Witchcraft Act and if found guilty, sentenced to death.	BBC Radio 4 Afternoon Play	
15 December 2005	My Difficult Second Album	Stephen Keyworth	Corey J Smith, Adrian Bower, Catherine Shepherd, Olivia Colman and Kate Colgrove Pope; Guitar played by David Hale	For as long as he can remember Tom has had two dreams: to fall in love with the right girl and live happily ever after; and to make the perfect album – ten perfect songs that take you on an emotional roller-coaster, that stretch, touch, shake and inspire you.	BBC Radio 4 Afternoon Play	
27 December 2005	The Singing Butler	Alexis Zegerman and Ron Butlin	Robert Portal, Natasha Little, Rachel Atkins, Jon Glover and Ewan Stewart	Dramatisation of the story behind Jack Vettriano's famous painting of a man and a woman dancing on a windswept beach, while their butler and maid do their best to shield the pair from the elements.	BBC Radio 4 Afternoon Play	
22 March 2006	A Tiny Light in the Darkness	Ursula Rani Sarma	Tarun Iyer, Katherine Igoe, Kulvinder Ghir, Meneka Das, Garrick Hagon, Liza Ross, Mark Bonnar, Ifan Meredith and Sarah Okeze	In late August 2005, a group of strangers find themselves thrown together when their tube carriage is plunged into darkness.	BBC Radio 4 Afternoon Play	
25 March 2006	Prince Unleashed (Note: Director: Dougie Irvine, Producer: Lu Kemp)	Robert Forrest	Helen McAlpine, Steven Ritchie, Steven Cartwright, Barbara Rafferty and Jimmy Chisholm	Holly has become a strange and silent little girl, living unhappily with her smoky Aunty Isa and her drunken Uncle Dave. She is determined to escape with the help of her dog Prince. But Prince is dead, and when he returns from the Happy Hunting Grounds to sort things out once and for all, Holly is alarmed to find he is not the obedient pedigree playmate he once was.	BBC Radio 4 Saturday Play	
7 April 2006	The Mecklington Miracle	Hannah McGill and Rachael McGill	Martin Hyder, Andrew Mayer, David Sant, Christine Bottomley and Charlie Hayes	A big conspiracy comes to a small town in this light-hearted comedy. The town's local hero hasn't stepped out of her house for years until Pedro arrives from Columbia determined to make a miracle happen in Mecklington.	BBC Radio 4 Afternoon Play	
8 May 2006 – 12 May 2006	A Patriot for Us	John Heilpern abridged by Robert Evans	Read by Gareth Thomas	Biography of playwright John Osborne, who changed the face of British theatre with an ironing board. Osborne's most famous protagonist, Jimmy Porter, first burst onto the English stage in the ground-breaking play Look Back in Anger on 8 March 1956.	BBC Radio 4 Book of the Week	
6 July 2006	Kitty Elizabeth Must Die	Louise Ironside	Pauline Lockhart, Paul Blair, Joanna Tope, Finlay Welsh, Lisa Gardner, Vicki Liddelle, Alibe Parsons and Samantha Young	Angie will do whatever it takes to have her own child. After two unsuccessful rounds of IVF and with the debt collectors now knocking at the door, the future is not looking bright. Then Angie finds diapersanddreams.com, a website for mothers to be, and with it an international, supportive and seemingly gullible community of excited, pregnant women.	BBC Radio 3 The Wire	
30 July 2006	Salome	Lizzie Hopley	Ian Brooker, Kenneth Cranham, Tony Curran, Paul Dinnen, Florence Hoath, Sally Hawkins, Karl Johnson, Gerrard McArthur, Fenella Woolgar	The myth of Salome and the dance of the seven veils began as a brief reference in the Bible and was later popularised in Wilde's highly sexual rendering of the tale. This new version focuses on the tense family drama at the centre of the myth. Set on the brink of a new era – while a young carpenter is travelling across Israel propagating his new religion – the story revolves around a young girl on the threshold of womanhood, who has been torn apart from her father and the world she knows when her mother falls in love with Salome's uncle Herod Antipas.	BBC Radio 3 Drama on 3	
25 August 2006	The January Wedding	Beatrice Colin	Karl Johnson, Cressida Trew, Richard Katz, Susan Engel and Sam Dale	In 1969 a landmark court case was brought in the UK. A young Polish woman petitioned for her marriage to an elderly Warsaw academic to be annulled. The annulment was granted on the basis that the marriage had taken place under duress. He had married her to save her from imprisonment under the Polish communist regime.	BBC Radio 4 Afternoon Play	
9 October 2006	A Tiger for Malgudi	R K Narayan dramatised by Ronald Frame	Paul Bazely, Meneka Das, Kulvinder Ghir, Raman Goyal, Indira Joshi, Raad Rawi and Nadim Sawalha	Now the companion of a Sādhu, an ageing tiger looks back on his life. A rich evocation of Indian life in the 1970s, this comic narrative views human absurdities through the eyes of a wild animal.	BBC Radio 4 Afternoon Play	
17 October 2006	Cats and Monkeys	Catherine Shepherd	Anna Carteret, Madeleine Brolly, Jack Shepherd, Ben Lewis, Catherine Shepherd and Paddy Anderson	Eve has come to India following the recent death of her parents. While everyone around her is seeking enlightenment, she is only concerned with obtaining a legal document which will allow probate on her parents' estate to be granted.	BBC Radio 4 Afternoon Play	
18 October 2006	It's Not You	Simon Burt	Jessica Harris and John Paul Hurley	It's a perfect holiday romance. Until they meet again. In the wrong place. And they are the wrong people. Tobes is not who Jo thinks he is, and Jo is not who Tobes thinks she is. So who, then, have they each fallen in love with? A tragi-comedy of misconceptions.	BBC Radio 4 Afternoon Play	
31 December 2006 – 7 January 2007	Resurrection	Leo Tolstoy dramatised by Robert Forrest	Katherine Igoe, Richard Dillane, Vivienne Dixon, Joanna Tope, Lesley Hart, Joe Arkley, John Buick, Phil McKee, Tom Brooke and Finlay Welsh	Katerina Maslova is a young prostitute on trial for the murder of one of her clients. Serving on the jury, Prince Dmitri recognises the young woman as the girl he seduced many years before. Believing himself partly responsible for her predicament, he embarks upon a complex legal attempt to reverse the sentence passed upon her.	BBC Radio 4 Classic Serial	
2 April 2007 – 6 April 2007	Captain Starlight's Apprentice	Kathryn Heyman	Helen Longworth, Teresa Gallagher, Richard Dillane, Martin Hyder, Sean Murray, Thomas Arnold, Federay Holmes and Ben Lewis	In a coma in a hospital in New South Wales, Rose begins to have a series of visions about Jess, former Australian rough-riding champion, widow of a Chinese circus-owner and star of bushranger films.	BBC Radio 4 Woman's Hour Drama	
13 April 2007	The Strange Desire of Ms Small	Debbie Jones	Sheila Donald, Jan Moffat, Pauline Lockhart and Phil McKee	Lois has all but forgotten the flamboyant mischief of her past until, in the drab surrounding of a high street bank, she meets Elsie, a disillusioned clerk 40 years her junior and exquisitely desirable.	BBC Radio 4 Afternoon Play	
15 June 2007	Jump	Alexis Zegerman	Danny Worters	Inspired by Event Horizon, Antony Gormley's exhibition at the Hayward Gallery. Gormley's army of lonely figures stand poised on the edges of buildings across the South Bank. A young free runner, jumping and vaulting his way across his familiar stamping ground, lands face-to-face with one of these iron men.	BBC Radio 4 Afternoon Play	
4 September 2007	The Architects	Chris Dunkley	Michael Jayston, Sandra Voe, Karl Johnson, John Rowe, Natasha Pyne and Ben Lewis	Howard is coming to the end of an unremarkable career designing houses which all look much the same. He intends to pursue his retirement in similar fashion, exactly like the next man. Then he meets Pat, who has decided that things have to change.	BBC Radio 4 Afternoon Play	
14 March 2008	Things to Do before You Die	Tom Dalton Bidwell	James Anthony Pearson, Stuart McQuarrie, Ayesha Antoine, Sophie Stanton, Lesley Nicol and John Lightbody	David is critically ill in hospital. Given the chance to have his dying wish granted, he asks for what most normal boys want – to lose his virginity.	BBC Radio 4 Afternoon Play	
11 August 2008 – 15 August 2008	The Pillow Book	Robert Forrest	Ruth Gemmell, John Rowe, Laura Rees, Benedict Cumberbatch, Caroline Martin, Richard Madden, Mark Bazeley and Colette O'Neil	A thriller and love story set in the court of the Empress Sadako in 10th century Japan. Within the palace walls, a series of disturbing crimes throws the court into confusion and unrest. Sei Shonagon's brilliance and wit is called upon for more than her Empress's amusement.	BBC Radio 4 Woman's Hour Drama	
4 February 2009	Déjà Vu (Note: Directed by Lu Kemp and Christophe Rault A co-production between BBC Radio 4 and ARTE Radio)	Alexis Zegerman	Caroline Catz, Karim Saleh, Richard Sanda, Hovnatan Avedikian, Chris Pavlo and Helen Longworth	A love affair between a woman from London and a Paris-based French Algerian. When Claire and Ahmed meet, it is language that stands between them. But when Ahmed is stopped and searched in London under section 44 of the Terrorism Act, the seed of a much larger difference is sown. A finalist for the Prix Europa Radio Fiction Prize 2009	BBC Radio 4 Afternoon Play	
8 June 2009 – 12 June 2009	The Pillow Book (series 2)	Robert Forrest	Ruth Gemmell, Mark Bazeley, Liam Brennan, Ralph Riach, Nick Underwood and Simon Ginty	Second series inspired by the writings of Sei Shonagon, the 10th century Japanese poet and lady-in-waiting to the Empress Teishi. It has been nine months since Lieutenant Yukinari and Lady Shonagon solved the crimes in the palace, and nine months since they parted. A chill wind brings ominous news, and a blood-stained letter from Yukinari.	BBC Radio 4 Woman's Hour Drama	
15 November 2010 – 19 November 2010	The Pillow Book (series 3)	Robert Forrest	Ruth Gemmell, Mark Bazeley, Simon Ginty, Laura Rees and Robin Laing	Set in 10th Century Japan, this is the third thriller inspired by the diaries of Sei Shonagon. Lady Shonagon and Lieutenant Yukinari return to investigate a murder in the Palace of the Sun Goddess. A favourite of the Emperor is found drowned in a pool in the Palace Gardens. But before Yukinari can investigate, the body is given a ceremonial burial and all trace of the crime washed away by the spring rains.	BBC Radio 4 Woman's Hour Drama	
17 November 2010	Everything	Oliver Emanuel	Natasha Watson, Sandy Grierson and Meg Fraser	Everything tells the story of a fourteen-year-old girl who spends 7 days in a refuge for runaways. Under Scottish law, any young person under the age of sixteen is allowed to stay in a refuge for up to seven days without parental notification.	BBC Radio 4 Afternoon Play	
27 January 2011	Ursula and Boy	Abigail Docherty	Austin Moulton, Natalie Press and Meg Fraser	Inspired by the true story of Ursula Kemp whose eight-year-old son testified against her for witchcraft in St. Osyth, Essex, in 1582.	BBC Radio 4 Afternoon Play	
9 February 2011	The Continuity Man	Stephen Keyworth	Nitin Ganatra, Ben Lewis, Julia Innocenti, Karl Johnson and Sally Orrock	Nitin Ganatra is fed up with playing the 'good family man' Masood. He feels there is more to him as an actor than playing the nice guy, the good husband. On the advice of his agent, Crawford Bunch, he sets about making his profile a little more 'edgy' in order to convince Hollywood producers that he really has what it takes to play the baddie. But unfortunately Nitin is just too nice. And he gets more than he bargained for when he finds himself head to head with 'The Continuity Man'.	BBC Radio 4 Afternoon Play	
12 February 2011	One Night In Iran	Oliver Emanuel	Khalid Abdalla and Maryam Hamidi	A man and a woman meet in a hotel room. They have been in love for five years but have never yet spent a night together. Tonight they meet alone for the first time. But this is Iran, and what the couple are doing is illegal. If they are caught, or even suspected, the consequences might be too terrible to contemplate.	BBC Radio 3 The Wire	
18 August 2011	Rightfully Mine	Ella Hickson	Kath Howden, Shauna Macdonald and John Paul Hurley	Twenty-six-year-old Amy is desperate to have her own child, but a teenage illness and subsequent operation has made it impossible for her to bear her own. Her last resort is to ask her fifty-year-old mother, Celia, to act as surrogate. A favour which Celia gives freely, and Amy is afraid to receive.	BBC Radio 4 Afternoon Play	
31 October 2011 – 4 November 2011	The Pillow Book (series 4)	Robert Forrest	Ruth Gemmell, Cal Macaninch, Freddie Rayner, Brian Ferguson and John Paul Hurley	Lady Shonagon and Lieutenant Yukinari reunite for a new adventure in 10th century Japan. The young Emperor has disappeared from the Palace into the wilds of Japan, to learn the ways of his people. Mischievous as ever, he leaves behind him a challenge addressed to his champion and favourite, Lieutenant Yukinari, to find him. And, of course, Yukinari must be accompanied by his guide in the ways of palace life, the Lady Shonagon. The Emperor makes two conditions: that the couple travel unaccompanied and in disguise, dressed in peasant garb, a prospect that Lady Shonagon – a connoisseur of all the finer luxuries of life – finds both appalling and humiliating.	BBC Radio 4 Woman's Hour Drama	
30 November 2011	Ancient Greek	Oliver Emanuel	Alex Austin, Vincent Ebrahim, Sophie Stanton, Caitlin FitzGerald and Austin Moulton	A promising student on the road to Oxbridge. A teacher on the eve of retirement. Graffiti scrawled on a school wall in a dead language. A play about education, protest and what we can expect in the future...	BBC Radio 4 Afternoon Play	
