= Ben Lewis (writer) =

Writer and theatre director

Ben Lewis is a writer for theatre, radio and television, theatre director and performer, who trained at LAMDA.

He co-created and directed My Name Is Sue (Soho Theatre/touring, Total Theatre Award 2009) and The Village Social (2011) with Dafydd James. Ben has also written two plays for BBC Radio 4: Blue Sky Thinking (9 September 2008) and Tiny (17 September 2010).

He is co-Artistic Director of Inspector Sands, and co-created its shows, If That's All There Is (Edinburgh International Festival Fringe Award 2009) and Hysteria (Total Theatre Award 2006), which have toured extensively in the UK and to countries including the US, China, Russia, Germany, Romania, Armenia, and most recently to Brits Off Broadway 2010. The company is currently developing its third show, Mass Observation (working title) with support from the Southbank Centre, the National Theatre Studio and the Almeida.

== Performances as an actor ==
=== Theatre ===
Date	Title	Role	Director	Theatre company	Awards
5 December 2006 – 13 January 2007	Pinocchio		Lu Kemp	Royal Theatre, Northampton	
18 August 2009 – 30 August 2009	If That's All There Is		Lu Kemp	Inspector Sands Traverse Theatre, Edinburgh	Edinburgh International Festival Fringe Award 2009

=== Radio ===
Date	Title	Role	Director	Station
17 October 2006	Cats and Monkeys	Xavier	Lu Kemp	BBC Radio 4 Afternoon Play
2 April 2007 – 6 April 2007	Captain Starlight's Apprentice	Jack, Doctor & Officer	Lu Kemp	BBC Radio 4 Woman's Hour Drama
4 September 2007	The Architects	Alan & Policeman	Lu Kemp	BBC Radio 4 Afternoon Play
7 August 2008	Left at Marrakech	Stickley	Fiona McAlpine	BBC Radio 4 Afternoon Play
9 September 2008	Blue Sky Thinking	Dave	Kirsty Williams	BBC Radio 4 Afternoon Play
7 March 2009	The Meek	Francis & Soldier 1	Kirsty Williams	BBC Radio 3 The Wire
9 February 2011	The Continuity Man	Oliver	Lu Kemp	BBC Radio 4 Afternoon Play
