= Laura Rees =

British actress from Northampton

- Education: The Academy Drama School; Royal Welsh College of Music & Drama
- Occupation: Actor
- Years active: 2003–present
- Awards: RWCMD's Prudence Emilyn-Jones Fund prize for Movement, Dance and Ballet

Laura Rees is a British actress of radio, stage, and the small screen, active since at least 2003.

== Early life and education ==
Rees is from Northampton. She trained at The Academy Drama School, and at the Royal Welsh College of Music & Drama.

== Career ==
In film, Rees played the role of Gina the record executive, in Richard Curtis' blockbuster romantic comedy, Love Actually (2003), and the role of Anna in the Metamorphosis (2012). Other film work includes the short The Dentist, directed by Stephen Frears and Pierre Tatarka.

In television, Rees appeared in the 1997 series, Where the Heart Is. In 2008 she appeared in the role of Beatrice Donnelly, in the second series of Masterpiece Mystery's Inspector Lewis, in the fourth episode, "The Great and the Good". She appeared again in the franchise's prequel, in 2013, the role of Faye Madison in the first series of Endeavour, in the second episode, "Fugue". Other television appearances include in Holby City, Murder in Mind, and Young Arthur (in the last as Morgana).

Rees starred in a Doctor Who audio series, The Exterminators in 2004. She went on to other radio credits, including BBC radio appearances in adaptations of Josephine Tey's The Franchise Affair (2005), Sei Shōnagon's The Pillow Book (2008 and 2010), the lead role in a two-part adaptation of Ruth, by Elizabeth Gaskell, on BBC Radio 4 (2009), Paul Gallico's The Lonely (2010), Euripides' Helen (2011), and Edward Bulwer-Lytton's Money (2011).

In theater, Rees' stage credits include having appeared in Brand for the Royal Shakespeare Company (RSC) in 2003, directed by Adrian Noble. As well, she portrayed Ophelia in Hamlet, directed by Yukio Ninagawa, in 2004. Rees was scheduled to play Juliet in Romeo and Juliet with the RSC in 2008, but withdrew from the production in October due to labyrinthitis and vestibular neuritis. In 2012 she played Lady Windermere in the Royal Exchange theatre's production of Lady Windermere's Fan. Other roles have included appearances at Shakespeare's Globe, including Lavinia in Titus Andronicus, and Luciana in The Comedy of Errors.

As of this date, is Rees was an active member of the London-based artistic collective The Factory Theatre Company, with Alex Hassell, Catherine Bailey, Jemima Rooper, Alan Morrissey, and John Hopkins, all of whom have performed in Round One and The Seagull Experiment around London.

== Awards and recognition ==
At the Royal Welsh College of Music & Drama, Rees was the recipient of the prize of the Prudence Emilyn-Jones Fund, for Movement, Dance and Ballet.

== Filmography, and other media works ==
=== Radio ===
| Date | Title | Role | Director | Station |
|---|---|---|---|---|
| 8 October 2005 | The Franchise Affair | Gladys Rees | Ellen Dryden | BBC Radio 4 Saturday Play |
| 11 August 2008 – 15 August 2008 | The Pillow Book | Empress | Lu Kemp | BBC Radio 4 Woman's Hour Drama |
| 2 August 2009 – 16 August 2009 | Ruth | Ruth | Ellen Dryden | BBC Radio 4 Classic Serial |
| 19 January 2010 | The Lonely | Patches | Kirsty Williams | BBC Radio 4 Afternoon Play |
| 15 November 2010 – 19 November 2010 | The Pillow Book (series 3) | Empress | Lu Kemp | BBC Radio 4 Woman's Hour Drama |
| 27 February 2011 | Helen | Slave / Chorus | Ellen Dryden | BBC Radio 3 Drama on 3 |
| 19 June 2011 | Money | Clara Douglas | Samuel West | BBC Radio 3 Drama on 3 |

== Selected work ==
=== In film ===
- Love Actually (2003) – Gina.
- The Dentist.
- Metamorphosis (2012) – Anna.

=== In theater ===
- Cecily, in The Importance of Being Earnest by Oscar Wilde. Directed by Braham Murray at the Royal Exchange, Manchester. (2004).
- Bunty Mainwaring, in The Vortex by Noël Coward. Directed by Jo Combes at the Royal Exchange, Manchester. (2007).
- Jean Rice, in The Entertainer by John Osborne. Directed by Greg Hersov at the Royal Exchange, Manchester. (2009).
- Lady Windermere, in Lady Windermere's Fan by Oscar Wilde. Directed by Greg Hersov at the Royal Exchange, Manchester. (2012).
