= Colette O'Neil =

British actress (1935–2021)

- Born: Mary Irene Colette McCrossan; 18 November 1935; Glasgow, Scotland
- Died: 11 July 2021 (aged 85); Glasgow, Scotland
- Occupation: Actress
- Spouse: Michael Ellis (m. 1960; div. 1973)
- Children: 3

Mary Irene Colette Ellis (née McCrossan, 18 November 1935 – 11 July 2021), better known by the stage name Colette O'Neil, was a Scottish actress, noted for her various roles on British television.

== Life and career ==
O'Neil was a semi-regular cast member of Coronation Street in the mid-1960s as Ruth Winter, and also made frequent guest appearances in series such as Z-Cars, Dixon of Dock Green, Adam Adamant Lives!, No Hiding Place and Softly, Softly. She appeared in series four of Special Branch, and was also a leading cast member in the drama series The Standard and The Spoils of War.

She played the role of Eleanor, Duchess of Gloucester, in the BBC television version [1965/1966] of The Wars of the Roses. In the 1974 BBC adaptation of David Copperfield O'Neil played Clara Copperfield, David's mother.

In 1983 she appeared in Doctor Who in the role of Tanha in the serial Snakedance.

She latterly appeared in Taggart, Lovejoy, Hamish Macbeth, Heartbeat, Peak Practice, Holby City, Monarch of the Glen and Bad Girls.

Her film appearances were few, but included roles in Frankenstein Must Be Destroyed (1969), The Smashing Bird I Used to Know (1969), Dreams Lost, Dreams Found (1987), Wild Flowers (1989), and Mortdecai (2015).

She also appeared as Hannah Sempel, the "keeper of the keys", in the BBC Radio drama "McLevy" alongside Scottish actors Brian Cox and Siobhan Redmond.

O'Neil married Michael Ellis and had two daughters and one son. She died in Glasgow in July 2021, at the age of 85.

== Radio credits ==
Date	Title	Role	Director	Station
23 October 1976	DS Vogel: Body on the Heath	Laura Holland	Jane Morgan	BBC Radio 4
2 June 2004	Visiting Time	Sarah	Lu Kemp	BBC Radio 4 Afternoon Play
11 June 2004	Soft Fall the Sounds of Eden	Janet	Gaynor Macfarlane	BBC Radio 4 Friday Play
28 January 2005	Folie à Trois	Colleen	Gaynor Macfarlane	BBC Radio 4 Friday Play
14 July 2005	The Best Snow for Skiing	Valda	Lu Kemp	BBC Radio 4 Afternoon Play
1 June 2004 – 1 June 2004	The Further Adventures of Sherlock Holmes	Miss Wallace	Patrick Rayner	BBC Radio 4
11 August 2008 – 15 August 2008	The Pillow Book	Tozammi	Lu Kemp	BBC Radio 4 Woman's Hour Drama
26 November 2012	McLevy: A Dangerous Remedy	Hannah	Bruce Young	BBC Radio 4 Afternoon Drama
3 December 2012	McLevy: No Looking Back	Hannah	Bruce Young	BBC Radio 4 Afternoon Drama
28 October 2016	Blood Sex and Money by Emile Zola: 3.7. Fate	Ancient Woman	Kirsty Williams	BBC Radio 4 Afternoon Play
