= Davy and Kristin McGuire =

- Born: 1982 (Davy), 1980 (Kristin); Colombo, Sri Lanka (Davy); Karl Marx Stadt, Germany (Kristin)
- Known for: experiential art, projection mapping, theatre, fine art, film, sculpture, immersive art, augmented reality, dance, installation art
- Awards: Oxford Samuel Beckett Theatre Trust Award Helpmann Award for Best Visual Theatre Production Japan Space Design Association Award Ginza Association Division Excellence Award Innovation of the Year Museum + Heritage Awards
- Website: studiomcguire.com

Davy McGuire and Kristin McGuire, co-directors of Studio McGuire, are British multimedia artists. They create experiential artworks within the mediums of projection mapping, theatre, fine art, animation, moving image, art installations, video games and immersive technologies.

== Early careers and personal lives ==
The duo met in 2004 during a student exchange in Arnhem and married in 2005 in England. Davy graduated from Dartington College of Arts in 2005 with a degree in Devised Theatre, whereas Kristin studied Contemporary and Classical Dance at Frankfurt University of Music and Performing Arts. Whilst continuously collaborating on joint art projects Kristin worked as a dancer with a variety of international dance and theatre companies including Cirque du Soleil until the duo set up their joint studio in Bristol. In 2017, Kristin graduated from Glasgow School of Art as a Master of Research in Creative Practices. The team is now resident in Kingston upon Hull where they create work under their company name Studio McGuire. They are represented by [Muriel Gupein Gallery] in New York, Woolff Gallery in London and the Projection Mapping Association of Japan in Tokyo and their works have been shown in more than 120 venues across 23 countries.

== Public artworks ==
- Hologram Jukebox (2020) - A traditional jukebox in which the selected artist appears as a hologram inside the jukebox to perform to the audience using a pepper's ghost illusion technique.
- A Night at the Mansion (2019) - Harewood House commissioned an immersive visitor attraction for the Christmas period using projection mapping techniques. The experience was awarded Innovation of the Year by The Museums + Heritage Show
- Still Lives(2018) - Absolutely Cultured commissioned a series of window displays for Urban Legends, a winter light festival in Hull based on Hans Christian Andersen stories.
- Micropolis (2017) - Hull UK City of Culture commission to create an installation as part of The Land of Green Ginger project. Micropolis was cardboard sculpture of digital projections of a miniature city's inhabitants
- Starkers (2015) - An installation called Starkers for the Museums at Night commission at Williamson Art Gallery and Museum in Birkenhead using projection mapping to an animate a 200-year-old statue.
- Ophelia's Ghost (2015) - A life sized holographic projection of Hamlet's Ophelia into a water filled basin commissioned by Altered Festival's 2015 Contemporary Art in Ancient Churches programme and has been shown as part of Compton Verney Art Gallery's exhibition Shakespeare in Art.
- The Hunter (2013) - As part of the Oxford Samuel Beckett Theatre Trust Award short listing process Davy and Kristin created The Hunter, a projection mapped paper diorama which subsequently won the couple the award. The Hunter has since been exhibited at the 12th Quenington Sculpture Show, the Doddington Sculpture Show, as part of the McGuire's retrospective in Shoreditch Town Hall in London, the World of Projection Mapping Festival in Kagawa/Japan and A Lamb in Wolf's Clothing in Bermondsey, London.
- Psycho - Homage to Hitchcock(2012) - A projection mapped paper diorama depicting a scene from Alfred Hitchcock's Psycho movie.
- Peepboardpleasure (2010) - A video projection on the illustrations of a traditional seaside peep-through board. Exhibited in Bristol, as part of the Grüne Meile Festival in Germany, at Burdall's Yard in Bath and the Arts by the Sea Festival 2012 in Bournemouth. The artists were awarded a second stipend from the Künstlerdorf Schöppingen for this work for which they created the interactive video installation Peepboardpleasure - A Peep Board with a Twist.
- A Study of Eating Habits (2005) - A multimedia installation using techniques of video projection mapping. A Study of Eating Habits was shown at the 2006 European Media Arts Festival in Germany, the 2006 BBC Big Screen Liverpool and the 2008 Macau Arts Festival in China.

== Gaming experiences ==
- Lucy (2019) - XR Stories commissioned project to create a digitally animated papercraft video game diorama which can be hung on a wall and played like a video game. The platform game was inspired by the character of Lucy Westernra from Bram Stoker's Dracula.
- Shelf-Life (2020) - XR Stories commissioned project to create a projection mapped platform game in which the player can manipulate a projected character (inspired by Super Mario) to jump across real objects in the physical world.

== Theatrical productions ==
=== The Icebook ===
During a 4-month residency at the Künstlerdorf Schöppingen Davy and Kristin created the Icebook, the world's first projection mapped pop up book in which a story is back projected onto the pages of the book. After putting a trailer of the work online, it went viral and launched the pair as an artist duo who had invented a new artistic medium by fusing projection mapping, paper craft, book art, theatre, performance and animation.

The Icebook has been featured internationally on TV (Canal+ in France, Deutsche Welle in Germany and on NHK in Japan), as well as being published in Digital Arts, Contagious Magazine and Elle Girl Korea and several thousand international websites and blogs. Since 2011 the Icebook has toured to at least 60 art festivals, theatre festivals, digital art festivals, cinemas and film festivals, conferences and art galleries around Europe, America and Asia.

=== The Paper Architect ===
In 2013 Davy and Kristin received the Oxford Samuel Beckett Theatre Award for their presentation of two projected paper dioramas, The Hunter and Psycho - Homage to Hitchcock. The production grant was awarded to create The Paper Architect, a theatre show blending paper craft, animation and live action, co-produced by the Barbican Centre London with CREATE in association with the Tobacco Factory in Bristol. The Paper Architect was invited to Perth International Arts Festival in 2015 where it won the Helpmann Award for Best Visual Theatre Production.

=== Theatre Book Macbeth ===
Theatre Book - Macbeth (2014) was an interactive pop-up book that brought 'the Scottish play' to life with miniature projection mapping. The multi media book featured six pop-up pages designed like sets on a stage, with actors projected onto the paper scenery and the audience could turn the pages to drive the story forward. The project was co-created with the Royal Shakespeare Company.

=== Howl's Moving Castle ===
For Christmas 2011, Davy and Kristin McGuire designed and directed a stage adaptation of Howl's Moving Castle at the Southwark Playhouse, who also commissioned the project. The production involved actors interacting with live video projections onto a set that replicated a paper pop-up castle. Howl's Moving Castle was adapted for the stage by Mike Sizemore and featured an original score by Fyfe Dangerfield. The cast included Stephen Fry as narrator Daniel Ings as Howl, Susan Sheridan as old Sophie, James Wilkes as Calcifer and Kristin played the part of young Sophie and the Witch of the Waste. Prior to its premiere Howl's Moving Castle received considerable media attention featuring on TV BBC News London, The Late Show with Joanne Good on BBC Radio London, national press and BBC online. After initial challenges due to technical difficulties Howl's Moving Castle sold out during the last weeks of a 6-week run.

The production was Time Out's Critic's Choice in December and received four-star reviews from Metro and The Public Reviews. Reviews praised the imaginative staging, the ground-breaking and ambitious technical ability of the projections, and the visuals. Despite some mixed reviews the show was received as a production that successfully married film and theatre: "Is it a play, is it a film, is it an installation? No - it's super-theatre!" The show inspired Southwark Playhouse's 2016 production of another story associated with Studio Ghibli, Kiki's Delivery Service.

=== Silent Movie ===
In 2007 Stroud Valleys Arts Space gave Davy and Kristin permission to create performance work for their annual Site Festival in Stroud. Davy and Kristin thus created and performed Silent Movie, a multimedia performance that mixes projections and live acting. The plot, which recounts a love story between a couple, is evocative of the silent movie genre from the beginning of the 20th century. The performance is viewed by an audience of 15 people through peep holes made in the front wall of a huge wooden box or a shopping window. In 2008 Silent Movie was shown at the Macau Arts Festival in China.

== Brand experiences ==
- Banquet of Hoshena (2019) - A commission by restaurateur Nadine Beshir to create the visuals for an immersive fine dining experience that combined projection mapping, storytelling and a five-course menu.
- Floating City (2013) - A joint commission from Barneys to decorate their Madison Avenue store in New York with a large scale animated paper structure.
- L'Alchimie de Courvoisier (2012) - Courvoisier commissioned theatrical installation showcasing the brand's history through a projected paper theatre displayed in Harrods of London.
- Mikimoto - Precious Moments (2016) - A Christmas window display for pearl manufacturers Mikimoto's store in Ghinza Road, Tokyo combining paper architecture with shadow play and digital projection.

== Collections ==
- Jam Jar Fairy Series (2013) - A Royal Shakespeare Company commission to create an art installation using pico projectors to create a display of holographic fairies projected into jam jars. in 2014. The installation was later developed into individual units in order to accommodate the demand for purchasing individual fairy holograms, thus creating the Jam Jar Fairy Series.
- Pinboard (2008) - The Girl with two Tone Hair which they later turned into a video installation entitled Pinboard. Pinboard was first exhibited at the Stroud Site Festival in 2010. In 2011 the Quenington Sculpture Trust awarded Davy and Kristin a bursary to include Pinboard in the trust's biennial showcase. Pinboard was part of Barn Gallery's Artspace, a showcase of their work at Burdall's Yard in Bath in 2012, their retrospective The Hunter at Shoreditch Town Hall in London and MEDI-ARTz Zushi Festival in Japan in 2014.
- The Dark Dolls House (2018) - Created a body of work for a solo exhibition at Woolff Gallery in London inspired by Film Noir The pieces have subsequently been exhibited as part of 'Wonder', a group exhibition at The Herbert Art Gallery and Museum and Wanrooij Gallery in Amsterdam.

== Music videos ==
- Magnets Caught in a Metal Heart for Thursday (2013)
- I Must Be A Lover for Guillemots (2012).
- Yanlış Seçim for Atakan Ilgazdağ (2014)

== Films ==
- A Journey to Wonderland (2013) - ELLE Magazine China commission for a short film featuring Chinese actress Zhou Xun wearing Chanel outfits and jewelry.
- Parting (2012) - French TV channel Canal+ commissioned 11 film makers to create a short film of 1:11 min length to commemorate 9/11.
- Dreams of Flight (2016)- The Norwegian Aviation Museum commission to create an animation film depicting the imagination of three children who dreamed about being able to fly.
- Vertigo (2020) - A London International Mime Festival commission to create a short film combining pole dancing with projection mapping.

== Live art ==
- Shooting the Messenger (2005) - Featuring the artists on a hitchhiking tour around Great Britain in which they explored Marshal McLuhan's theories on the global village.

== Bibliography ==
- Shakespeare, Spectatorship and the Technologies of Performance (2020) Pascale Aebischer, Cambridge University Press ISBN 978-1108420488
- Paradise of Paper Art (2013) Yannick Yuan, Designerbooks, Beijing ISBN 978-9881607546
- Light Works - Experimental Projection Mapping (2014) Francesco Murano, Rome ISBN 978-88-548-7148-9
- Intermediating the Book Beautiful: Shakespeare and the Doves Press (2016) Sujata Iyengar, Johns Hopkins University Press
- Artist's Book Yearbook (2011) Editor: Sarah Bodman, Impact Press ISBN 978-1-906501-06-8
- You're Only Here for the Culture (2018) Kevin Crooks, UK ISBN 978-1-9993564-0-8
- On Choreography & Making Dance Theatre (2018) Mark Bruce, Oberon Books, London ISBN 9781783197774
