= Hetty Sorrel =

Character from George Eliot's 1859 novel Adam Bede

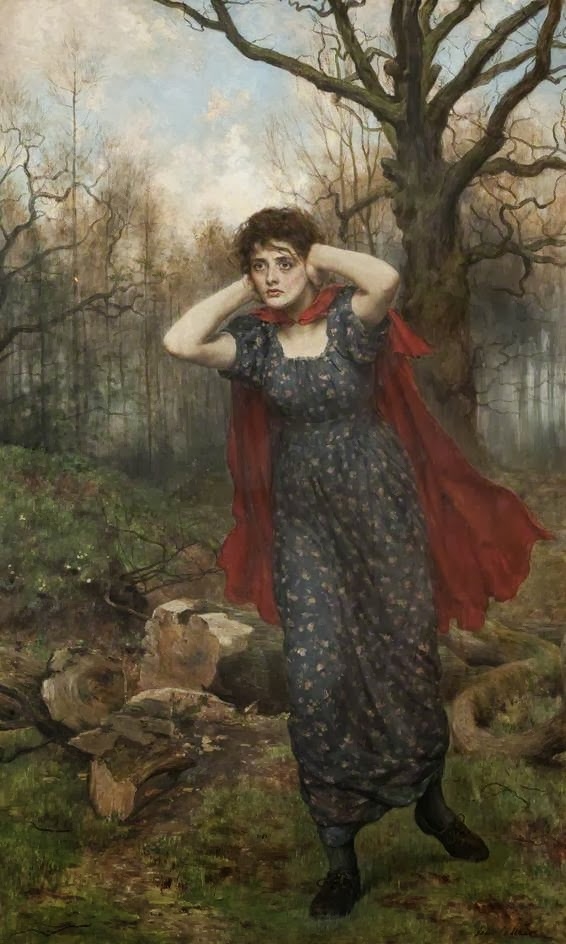
Hetty Sorrel, painting by John Coller

Hetty Sorrel is a major character in George Eliot's 1859 novel Adam Bede.

Beautiful but thoughtless Hetty lives in the fictional community of Hayslope — a rural, pastoral and close-knit community in 1799. Her home is on Mr. Martin Poyser's dairy farm as she is his niece. Because she is an extremely pretty girl, she is admired by Mr. Craig, Adam Bede as well as Captain Arthur Donnithorne.

Aside from her great physical beauty, George Eliot takes care to make it clear that she does not have many attractive personal qualities. She is spoiled, cold, insensitive, indifferent to other people's problems, and almost comically vain and selfish. Even in love Hetty is relentless in her capacity to use others for her own gain. At first she is devoted to Arthur then after she realizes he will not make her a "great lady" she turns her affections to Adam.

Hetty is a cousin by marriage of Dinah Morris, a fervent Methodist lay preacher. In contrast to Hetty, Dinah is depicted as completely pure, generous, unselfish, modest, and unfailingly compassionate. Both female characters are two-dimensional. Their stories are interesting yet one is completely good and the other is completely despicable. Dinah has no negative qualities and Hetty has no good qualities, making the characters superficial. At the end of the novel Hetty becomes more human-like and Eliot treats her with more compassion through her suffering.

== Story ==
The novel revolves around a love triangle between vain and pleasure-loving Hetty Sorrel, Captain Arthur Donnithorne the young squire who seduces her, and Adam Bede her unacknowledged suitor. Although she is indifferent to good, stalwart Adam Bede, he is in love with Hetty. She is only a milkmaid yet she longs for the luxurious life of an upper class lady. In the 1700 - 1800s, marriage was approved within the same socioeconomic classes. In this respect, Hetty's desire to marry into wealth is extremely naive and almost comical. Being young and inexperienced she believes she is destined to this life due to her physical beauty.

Hetty is attracted to Captain Donnithorne mostly because he is a rich man. He abuses his power to seduce Hetty into a sexual affair and she appears to fall in love with him. Although Eliot insists that Arthur is overall a good, conscionable man, his seduction of Hetty is selfish and degrading. He knows he will never marry her and he compromises her reputation with their tryst.

Adam interrupts a meeting between them in the Chase and he is devastated. The two men fight and Adam insists Arthur write Hetty a letter before he returns to the militia informing her that their relationship is over. Broken-hearted and secretly pregnant, Hetty agrees to marry Adam to improve her situation. Before they wed however she abandons Adam and runs away in search of Arthur. She makes a long and arduous journey to Windsor only to discover the militia has moved to Ireland. Unwlling to return to the village and shame her family, Hetty considers suicide by drowning herself in an icy cold pond. She loses her nerve and delivers her baby in an inn. She kills the child by abandoning him in a field where he dies of exposure.

Hetty is caught and tried for child murder. Adam is devastated yet he blames Arthur and forgives Hetty. She is found guilty and sentenced to hang. When Arthur takes a leave from the militia to attend his grandfather's funeral, he hears of Hetty's impending execution. He races to the court and has her sentence commuted to penal transportation to Australia for the rest of her life. In the end Hetty is permitted to return from Australia after serving eight years of her sentence but dies before she reaches England.

According to The Oxford Companion to English Literature (1967),

"the plot [of Adam Bede] is founded on a story told to George Eliot by her aunt Elizabeth Evans, a Methodist preacher and the original of Dinah Morris of the novel, of a confession of child-murder, made to her by a woman named Mary Voce in prison."

In November 1801 Voce was a married woman whose husband Thomas was in the militia. She lived in Fishing Gate in Nottingham. When he was away, she became pregnant by another man and killed the child so her husband wouldn't discover her disloyalty.

Voce was a 24-year-old beautiful woman whose parents were unmarried. Like Hetty, they died when she was young and she was raised by relatives. She married Thomas Voce, an abusive man and they frequently separated and reunited. A neighbour stated Voce was abusive because of Mary's excessive extra-marital affairs. The Voces had a 5-year-old son whom Thomas suspected wasn't his own.

On one occasion Voce left Mary alone, travelling a distance of over 160 miles to a town called Chatham to enlist for his pension. While he was away Mary tried unsuccessfully to find work carding cotton. Instead she turned to sex work. Voce gave birth to Elizabeth Voce, another man's child and the man abandoned her. Fearful that Thomas would leave her when he arrived home Voce killed Elizabeth with arsenic in water. The baby reacted violently and screamed for some minutes until neighbours came running. When she was arrested she blamed the neighbourhood children for feeding the arsenic to the child.

Voce professed her innocence claiming she purchased the arsenic to kill herself. The judge agreed Mary had reason to worry that Thomas would abuse her when he discovered Elizabeth but he stated this was Mary's fault. After receiving the death sentence Mary exclaimed, "Oh my heart! My heart will break!" She professed her innocence until lay preachers including a woman named Elizabeth Tomlinson, convinced her to tell the truth. She admitted to leading a shameful life (prostitution) and to killing her baby. She asked God for forgiveness. She was allowed to visit with her young son once more but refused to visit with her husband.

On March 16 1802, the day of her hanging Voce accepted her fate with serenity. She was brought to the gallows with her own empty coffin beside her telling the lay preachers, "This is the best day I ever saw. I am quite happy. I had rather die than live." She helped the executioner to place the ropes around her neck and exclaimed, "Glory! Glory to Jesus! I shall soon be in glory. Glory is indeed already begun in my soul and the angels of God are about me!" Voce was hung for an hour and after dissection by surgeons, her remains were publicly displayed. Voce's brother-in-law named William was hanged in 1775.

Two years after Voce's hanging Elizabeth Tomlinson married a man named Samuel Evans. Elizabeth was aunt to Mary Ann Evans (George Eliot, author of the novel Adam Bede) and told her the story of Mary Voce. Elliot based the novel around the Voce woman.
