= Alexis Zegerman =

British actress

Alexis Zegerman is a British actress and writer.

== Early life and training ==
Zegerman grew up in a Jewish family in London, and trained at the Central School of Speech and Drama.

== Acting career ==
=== Film and TV ===
Zegerman won a British Independent Film Award for Best Supporting Actress for her portrayal of Zoe, Poppy's best friend and roommate, in Mike Leigh's comedy-drama film Happy-Go-Lucky. The role also garnered a London Film Critics award nomination. This was her second collaboration with Leigh. She played the part of Daliah Sofer in Storm which premiered at the 59th Berlin International Film Festival in 2009, and Gemma in ITV drama U Be Dead. She also appeared in the films Albatross, The Wedding Video, and Disobedience.

=== Theatre ===
In 2005 Zegerman appeared in the original cast of Mike Leigh's play Two Thousand Years, at the Royal National Theatre in London. In 2009, she also appeared in Seven Jewish Children, a play by Caryl Churchill at the Royal Court Theatre. She played Cissie in the revival of Arnold Wesker's Chicken Soup with Barley from June 2011 at the Royal Court Theatre. She appeared onstage in Travelling Light at the Royal National Theatre, directed by artistic director Nicholas Hytner. She recently appeared as Eva Jacobowicz in the world premiere of Tom Stoppard's play Leopoldstadt at the Wyndham's Theatre in London's West End. In 2022, Hampstead Theatre put on Zegerman's new play, The Fever Syndrome, directed by Roxana Silbert and starring Robert Lindsay as Professor Richard Myers, fictional inventor of an IVF treatment.

== Writing career ==
=== Plays ===
Zegerman began writing on the Royal Court Young Writers’ Programme. She has written plays for BBC Radio 4 including Ronnie Gecko (Richard Imison Award commendation, Are You Sure?, The Singing Butler, Jump, and the comedy series School Runs. She also wrote the play Déjà Vu, a co-production between the BBC and Arte in France, which was simultaneously broadcast in both countries in February 2009. The play was a finalist for the Prix Europa 2009.

Zegerman became Pearson Writer-in-Residence at Hampstead Theatre in 2007, where her play Lucky Seven premiered in November 2008. It has since received further productions in the UK and abroad. Short plays include I Ran the World for the Royal Court, and Noise at Soho Theatre (Westminster Prize for New Playwriting 2003). Her play Killing Brando opened at the Young Vic as part of Paines Plough's Wild Lunch in 2004, and was later produced at Òran Mór in Glasgow for their ‘A Play, a Pie and a Pint’ season. She has been named a finalist for the prestigious 2011–2012 Susan Smith Blackburn Prize. Her play Holy Sh!t had its world premiere at the off-West End Kiln Theatre, and was the first play to open the Kiln's inaugural season after its refurbishment. The play starred Claire Goose, Daniel Lapaine, Dorothea Myer-Bennet and Daon Broni.

In March 2022, Hampstead Theatre premiered Zegerman's play, The Fever Syndrome, directed by Roxana Silbert and starring Robert Lindsay as Professor Richard Myers, fictional inventor of an IVF treatment.

=== Screenwriting ===
Zegerman wrote the screenplay for The Honeymoon Suite (2010). She wrote the screenplay to feature film Arthur's Whisky starring Diane Keaton, Lulu, David Harewood, Bill Paterson, Patricia Hodge which premiered on Sky Movies on 1 January 2024.
