= Dickie Beau =

British actor

- Born: Richard Boyce
- Occupations: Film and stage actor
- Awards: Oxford Samuel Beckett Theatre Trust Award (2014)

Richard Boyce, known professionally as Dickie Beau, is a British film and stage actor. His stage performances often involve lip-synching to archival audio recordings.

== Early life and education ==
At the age of five, Beau played the Handsome Prince in Snow White and the Seven Dwarfs and knew he wanted to act. His childhood idols included Judy Garland and Marilyn Monroe. He trained in Drama at Manchester University, and subsequently worked in a Milan theatre company, Teatro della Contraddizione, whose work was inspired by Pina Bausch.

== Career ==
=== Technique ===
Beau's use of lip-synching was inspired by the drag queen Suppositori Spelling, who he met in London in 2006. An additional inspiration for his technique was the journalist Richard Meryman. Beau sometimes lip-synchs to his own voice, sometimes to those of other performers. He calls the technique "rememberment", and it has also been described as "hauntological dramaturgy".

== Personal life ==
Beau is openly gay, having known his sexual orientation from the age of around five or six. Beau practises meditation.

== Credits ==
=== Theatre ===
Year	Title
2009	A Self Portrait
2013	This is Not A Dream
2012–2013	BLACKOUT: Twilight of the Idols
2013	Lost in Trans
2014	Camera Lucida
2017–2023	Re-Member Me
2019	Botticelli in the Fire
2020-2021	Dick Whittington
2022	The Tempest
2022	¡SHOWMANISM!
2024-25	The Invention of Love (Hampstead Theatre)

=== Film ===
Year	Title	Role	Ref.
2018	Colette	Georges Wague	
2018	Bohemian Rhapsody	Kenny Everett	
2019	Country of Hotels	Talk Show Host	
2021	The Real Charlie Chaplin	Roddy McDowall	
2026	Elsinore	Sister Belladonna	

== Accolades ==
- 2012 London Cabaret Award for Best Alternative Performer
- 2013 Jardin d’Europe Contemporary Dance
- 2014 Oxford Samuel Beckett Theatre Trust Award
- 2017 Best Supporting Male in the Offie
