= You Me Bum Bum Train =

Theatre production

You Me Bum Bum Train is an interactive theatre performance created by Kate Bond and Morgan Lloyd in 2004. The pair met as art students in Brighton, England, where they were studying illustration and film. The production gained critical acclaim in the London theatre community, winning the Oxford Samuel Beckett Theatre Trust Award and the Evening Standard Theatre Award for Outstanding Newcomer in 2010 as well as earning a nomination for a Laurence Olivier Award for Outstanding Achievement in an Affiliate Theatre in 2013.

== Overview ==
Visitors to the performance pass through a series of scenes of which they have no foreknowledge, in which they are either passive or where they must improvise a part without any preparation.

== Production ==
=== Stagings ===
Having been around since 2004, the show returned in 2011 in a former postal depot in Holborn, and a new version of the show – at Empire House in Stratford, East London in 2012 – was nominated for an Olivier Award for Outstanding Achievement in an Affiliate Theatre. In 2015, the show was mounted again, this time in what had been Foyles bookshop on London's Charing Cross Road where their last show started on 25 February 2016 and finished on 29 April. A total of 13,242 volunteers took part in the 2016 show. The 2024/2025 staging of the show ran from Nov 2024 - May 2025 in a location right on Shaftesbury Avenue. You Me Bum Bum Train raised £120,000 for charity in the last production.

In April 2025, You Me Bum Bum Train provoked controversy, this time amongst its volunteer cast members after American billionaire and Amazon founder Jeff Bezos and his family were paying audience members. Volunteers were "horrified" that they had to perform in front of the billionaire and his family with no notice. Volunteer cast members penned a letter against "being put in a room with someone who is working to support the destabilisation of US democracy". Bond and Lloyd responded saying "Bum Bum Train is built on empathy" and they wanted to "keep the experience open to everyone".

=== Performers ===
You Me Bum Bum Train has provoked controversy due to the fact that none of the performers are paid, though the directors stress that performers and crew are involved on a voluntary basis, that many are not trained professionals, and that they are under no obligation to stay during performances. In November 2015, the trade union Equity criticised the £150,000 Arts Council England funding allocated to You Me Bum Bum Train, as it was advertising for professional dancers but not paying them despite selling tickets "at rates typical of a West End show." In June 2016, the trade union BECTU criticised You Me Bum Bum Train for "exploiting workers after advertising for unpaid production interns." BECTU launched an investigation concerning "the legality of the 'outrageous' internships, which would see successful applicants work at least two days each week for a minimum four hours each day."

== Reception ==
=== Critical response ===
The entertainment magazine Dazed & Confused reported; "What was one of London's more obtuse treasures is set to become one of Great Britain's proudest moments." The Times said: "It leaves you questioning everything, and it's lots of fun." Time Out magazine wrote; "My highlight of 2008 was You Me Bum Bum Train, if only real life were that interesting." Hanna Hanra, writing for Vice, described it as a series of "highly detailed, absurd real life scenarios following one another on a nonsense high-paced narrative". Ruby Wax, a passenger in 2015 said, "I'm in a really dark place right now. This is the only thing I’d get out of bed for, seriously it’s the best therapy."

=== Accolades ===
- 2010 - Oxford Samuel Beckett Theatre Trust Award
- 2010 - The Evening Standard Theatre Award for Outstanding Newcomer
- 2013 - Nomination for a Laurence Olivier Award for Outstanding Achievement in an Affiliate Theatre
