= Weekend (2011 film) =

- Theatrical release poster
- Directed by: Andrew Haigh
- Written by: Andrew Haigh
- Produced by: Tristan Goligher
- Starring: Tom Cullen; Chris New
- Cinematography: Ula Pontikos
- Edited by: Andrew Haigh
- Music by: James Edward Barker
- Production companies: Synchronicity Films; UK Film Council; Creative Scotland
- Distributed by: Peccadillo Pictures
- Release dates: 11 March 2011 (SXSW); 4 November 2011 (United Kingdom)
- Running time: 97 minutes
- Country: United Kingdom
- Language: English
- Budget: £120,000
- Box office: $1.1 million

Weekend is a 2011 British romantic drama film written and directed by Andrew Haigh, and starring Tom Cullen and Chris New as two men who meet and begin a sexual relationship the weekend before one of them plans to leave the country. The film won much praise and critical acclaim after premiering at the SXSW festival in the US, and was a success at the box office in the UK and the U.S., where it received a limited release.

== Plot ==
On a Friday night in Nottingham, Russell attends a house party. He assures best friend Jamie that he will be there on Sunday for Jamie's daughter's birthday. Russell leaves early, deciding to go to a gay club for a hookup. He meets Glen, an art student, and they have sex at Russell's apartment. The next morning, Glen coaxes Russell to speak into a voice recorder about the previous night, for an art project. The more reserved Russell is taken aback by Glen's blunt discussion of sex. After Russell finishes, they exchange numbers before Glen leaves. Russell writes about Glen on his laptop, something he does after each of his encounters.

Russell spends a lonely morning working as a lifeguard. He texts Glen, who agrees to meet. The two learn about each other, and share a bicycle ride back to Russell's flat, where they continue discovering more about each other's pasts. Glen explains that his art project seeks to explore the gap between who people are and who they want to be, as demonstrated by the personas they assume when hooking up with someone for the first time. Russell reveals that he never came out to his parents because he does not know who they are; he grew up in foster homes with Jamie.

Before leaving, Glen discloses that he is moving to Oregon the next day to attend a two-year art course. On a whim, Glen invites Russell to his goodbye party at a straight bar that night, and Russell decides to attend. While Glen gets into an argument about heteronormativity with the bar owner, Russell chats with Jill, Glen's flatmate. She tells Russell that she never got to listen to his recording; Glen let her listen to all of his others. She then tells Russell that she and her friends do not expect Glen to travel to America, to the point that they started a bet. She also discloses that Glen was in a relationship with someone named John, who cheated on Glen repeatedly and was attacked at a park shortly before the relationship ended. Since then, Glen has said he "doesn't do boyfriends."

Russell and Glen ditch Glen's friends and go to a carnival. Glen admits he feels like his friends hold him back. They return to Russell's apartment and smoke marijuana, drink alcohol, and snort cocaine.

Russell confesses that he records his experiences, albeit more privately. He reads some of his entries to Glen, and it is revealed that one of the men Russell slept with was John. They begin arguing about the motivations for the fight for gay marriage given Glen's anti-relationship stance. Russell tells Glen that he thinks Glen only lost faith in relationships because of John. Glen tells him it is not that simple; while he thinks Russell would make an amazing boyfriend, he does not currently want one. Russell is upset and goes to the bathroom. He returns and they reconcile, passionately making love that night.

On Sunday morning, Russell reveals how self-conscious he feels in public about being gay. Glen deduces that Russell keeps a record of his encounters because he is fascinated by how people come out. Glen pretends to be Russell's father, giving Russell the opportunity to come out. Glen notes that he is leaving by train that afternoon, while Russell has Jamie's daughter's birthday party to attend. Russell searches for the right way to say goodbye, but Glen leaves after kissing him.

At the party, Russell attempts to stay interested, but is clearly distracted. Jamie persuades Russell to talk about what is on his mind, though they do not usually talk about this part of Russell's life. After Russell explains, Jamie takes Russell to the train station, where he finds Glen.

As the two wait for Glen's train, Russell struggles to convey how much their encounter meant to him. They kiss in public, notable for the usually restrained Russell. Glen gives Russell a present, and with one last kiss, Glen leaves. Later, looking out from his apartment window, Russell opens the present to find the voice recorder that Glen used to record Russell. He hears himself begin to recount the events of the weekend.

== Cast ==
- Tom Cullen as Russell
- Chris New as Glen
- Jonathan Race as Jamie
- Laura Freeman as Jill
- Loretto Murray as Cathy
- Johnathan Wright as Johnny
- Sarah Churm as Helen
- Vaxuhall Jermaine as Damien
- Joe Doherty as Justin
- Kieran Hardcastle as Sam

== Production ==
Much of the film was shot on location in Nottingham in late 2010. The promotion and production stills were shot by photography team Quinnford & Scout (Colin Quinn and Oisín Share), whose work inspired Haigh's design on location. The duo also make a cameo in the film.

During a Q&A session at the IFI in Dublin on 11 November 2011, Director Andrew Haigh said the film's budget was "around 120,000" — not specifying a currency.

According to Cullen, much of the action and dialogue was improvised: "Andrew, Chris and I really tore the script to pieces... I could literally throw anything at [Chris New] and he would respond accordingly. When we started each scene, we were never entirely sure where it would go".

== Release ==
Weekend received its world premiere at the SXSW Film Festival in Austin, Texas in March 2011. It screened at other North American festivals, including the Maryland Film Festival. It was released theatrically in the United States on 23 September 2011 and in the United Kingdom on 4 November 2011.

=== Critical reception ===
Weekend has been critically acclaimed. Rotten Tomatoes reports that 95% of critics have given the film a positive review based on 87 reviews, with an average score of 8.1/10. The website's critical consensus reads "It may be a chamber piece but Weekend's revelations on modern sexuality expand far beyond the modest setting." Roger Ebert described it as "a smart, sensitive, perceptive film, with actors well suited to the dialogue."

Wesley Morris of the Boston Globe wrote it is “One of the truest, most beautiful movies ever made about two strangers.” Lisa Schwarzbaum from Entertainment Weekly wrote “British filmmaker Andrew Haigh‘s background in editing (from Gladiator to Mister Lonely) is evident in the casual beauty of moments that only appear “found,” giving Weekend an engrossing documentary feel.” Eric Hynes from the Village Voice wrote: “Naturalistic without being ineloquent, heartfelt yet unsentimental, Weekend is the rarest of birds: a movie romance that rings true.”

=== Awards and nominations ===
The film has received several awards and nominations:

- SXSW Film Festival — Audience Award; Emerging Visions
- Nashville Film Festival — Grand Jury for Best Film; Best Actor for Tom Cullen
- Toronto Inside Out LGBT Film Festival — Audience Award Best Film
- Frameline, San Francisco Gay and Lesbian Film festival – Best Film
- Outfest Los Angeles — Grand Jury Prize for International Feature
- Merlinka festival - International Queer Film festival - Best Queer Film
- Oslo Gay and Lesbian Film Festival — Winner Grand Jury Prize; Audience Award
- BFI London Film Festival — Tom Cullen and Chris New nominated for Best Newcomer
- British Independent Film Awards — Most Promising Newcomer for Tom Cullen; Achievement in Production
- Evening Standard British Film Awards — Best Screenplay
- London Film Critics' Circle Awards — British Breakthrough Filmmaker for Andrew Haigh
- Crossing Europe Film Festival - Audience Award

== Home media ==
A "director-approved special edition" of Weekend was released by The Criterion Collection on both DVD and Blu-ray on 21 August 2012. The release includes a high-definition digital master of the film; new interviews with cast and crew; two of Cullen's and New's joint audition scenes; two short films by Haigh: Cahuenga Blvd. (2003) and Five Miles Out (2009); and additional features.

== Banning of film in Catholic Church cinemas ==
The film was restricted to 10 cinemas on its release in Italy on 10 March 2016 after the country's bishops branded Andrew Haigh's acclaimed gay love story "indecent" and "unusable" in the country's many church-owned film theaters. The film was shunned by the more than 1,100 cinemas owned by the Catholic Church that comprise the bulk of Italy's network of independent/arthouse theaters. The country's official film board approved the film for audiences over 14.

== Musical ==
A stage adaptation of Weekend was presented at the ASCAP Foundation Musical Theatre Workshop in May 2025. The musical adaptation features a script and songs by Julian Hornik, Khiyon Hursey, and Mark Sonnenblick.
