= Oxford Samuel Beckett Theatre Trust Award =

British theatre award

The Oxford Samuel Beckett Theatre Trust Award is an annual award established in 2003 and granted by the Samuel Beckett Theatre Trust to support the showcasing of innovative theatre by a company or individual. According to the director of the trust Romilly Walton Masters in 2003:

From the outset, the Trust has had a specific interest in aiding artists of the avant-garde who often have to wait many years before they are taken up by the commercial theatre. Through this award, the Trust is looking to help an artist, or a group, realize a fully resourced professional production. It is looking to assist artists that hitherto may not have had this opportunity. The aim is to support work of quality and promise, and we fully expect the work submitted to be of the highest calibre.

== Winners ==
=== 2000s ===
- 2003 - Cue Deadly by Dan Hine and Kirsty Housley
- 2004 - The Pink Bits by Lucy Ellinson, Wendy Hubbard, Mamoru Iriguchi, Sarah Levinsky and Ben Pacey
- 2005 - Almost Blue by Gareth Fry, Lu Kemp, Dominic Leclerc, Neil Laidlaw, and Chris Dunkley
- 2006 - Project E: An Explosion by The Work Theatre Collective
- 2007 - The Terrific Electric by Boileroom
- 2008 - Helium by Slung Low
- 2009 - Room Temperature Romance by Levantes Dance Theatre

=== 2010s ===
- 2010 - You Me Bum Bum Train by Kate Bond and Morgan Lloyd
- 2013 - The Paper Architect by Kristin McGuire and Davy McGuire
- 2014 - Camera Lucida by Dickie Beau
- 2015 - The Body by Nigel Barett and Louise Mari
- 2016 - The Machine by Collectif and then...
- 2017 - Roller by Rachel Mars and Nat Tarrab
- 2018 - Marathon by JAMS with Alan Fielden, Sophie Grodin, Malachy Orozo and Jemima Young
- 2019 - Nosedive by Superfan

=== 2020s ===
- 2020 - Prime_Time by In Bed with My Brother
- 2022 - The UK Drill Project by HighRise Entertainment and Perfect Show for Rachel by Zoo Co
- 2024 - Quiet Songs by Finn Beames & Company
