= Crawford Logan =

British actor

Crawford Logan is a British actor best known for his work in radio. In 2006 he became the latest actor to play the eponymous hero Paul Temple in a revival of the long-running mystery series on BBC radio. In 2009 he narrated the BBC Radio 4 Book of the Week, Newton and the Counterfeiter by Thomas Levenson.

On television, he has appeared in Doctor Who as Deedrix in the Tom Baker story Meglos and Secret Army. He is also a member of the band The Martians. Logan played D.I. Donaghue in the crime drama P Division: Code Four One on BBC Radio 4 in the 1994 and 1995 series.

== Radio ==
| Date | Title | Role | Director | Station |
|---|---|---|---|---|
| January 1982 – March 1982 | Earthsearch 2 | Android Surgeon General Kraken | Glyn Dearman | BBC Radio 4 |
| 12 November 1988 | For King and Country | Lieutenant Tom Webb | Martin Jenkins | BBC Radio 4 Saturday Night Theatre |
| 23 November 1992 – 28 November 1992 | Terry Pratchett - Guards! Guards! | Vetinari | | BBC Radio 4 |
| June 1995 | Battle for the Dome | Rinaldo | Martin Jenkins | BBC Radio 4 |
| 30 December 1995 | Death of an Ugly Sister | | Ned Chaillet | BBC Radio 4 Saturday Night Theatre |
| 31 August 1997 - 28 September 1997 | Tom's Midnight Garden | Uncle Alan | John Taylor | BBC Radio 4 |
| 31 May 1999 | Let It Bleed | Chief Superintendent Watson | Gaynor Macfarlane | BBC Radio 4 Afternoon Play |
| 25 May 2004 | 15 Minutes to Go: Viper in the Nest | Headmaster / Radio Announcer | Lu Kemp | BBC Radio 4 Woman's Hour Drama |
| 26 March 2005 | The Distant Echo | MacLennan | Lu Kemp | BBC Radio 4 Saturday Play |
| 12 September 2005 | 15 Minutes that Changed the World: Amo, Amas, Amat | Doctor | Lu Kemp | BBC Radio 4 Woman's Hour Drama |
| 7 August 2006 – 2 October 2006 | Paul Temple and the Sullivan Mystery | Paul Temple | Patrick Rayner | BBC Radio 4 |
| 16 May 2008 – 4 July 2008 | Paul Temple and the Madison Mystery | Paul Temple | | BBC Radio 4 |
| 26 March 2009 | Gondwanaland | Marbury | Kirsty Williams | BBC Radio 4 Afternoon Play |
| 28 February 2010 | La Princesse de Clèves | Chorus 3 | Kirsty Williams | BBC Radio 3 Drama on 3 |
| 11 June 2010 – 30 July 2010 | Paul Temple and Steve | Paul Temple | Patrick Rayner | BBC Radio 4 |
| 24 August 2011 – 12 October 2011 | A Case for Paul Temple | Paul Temple | Patrick Rayner | BBC Radio 4 |
| 8 July 2012 | The Go-Between | Mr. Maudsley | Matt Thompson | BBC Radio 3 Drama on 3 |
| 3 July 2013 | Paul Temple and the Gregory Affair | Paul Temple | Patrick Rayner | BBC Radio 4 |
