= Dinah Morris =

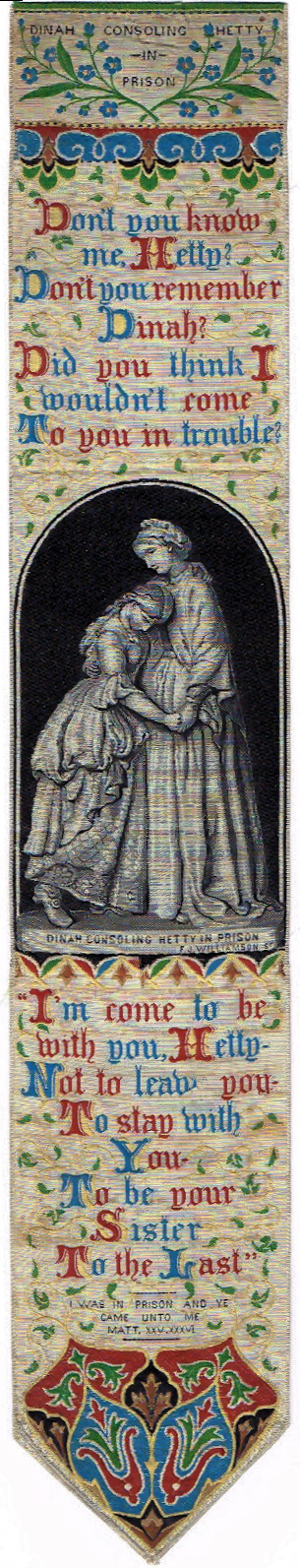
19th-century bookmark depicting Dinah (right) consoling Hetty Sorrel.

Dinah Morris is a major character in George Eliot's novel Adam Bede (1859); a Methodist lay preacher, she was modelled on Eliot's aunt Elizabeth Evans.

Dinah visits the fictional community of Hayslope — a rural, pastoral and close-knit community in 1799. She says to Lisbeth Bede in Chapter Ten, "I work in the cotton-mill when I am at home." She lives thirty miles away in the fictional Snowfield, in the fictional Stonyshire County.

== Description ==
She is a cousin by marriage of Hetty Sorrel and related to the Poysers. Rachel Poyser, her aunt, wishes Dinah would stay with them in Hayslope.

Dinah is deeply religious, a follower of Wesleyan Methodism. She lives to comfort others, including Adam Bede's mother when her husband is drowned. She offers to help Hetty if she is ever in need. When Hetty commits her crime and cannot own up to it, Dinah's presence allows Hetty to face what she has done and ask for forgiveness.

At the beginning of the novel, Dinah lives at the Poyser farm because she is Mrs. Poyser's niece. Though she is an attractive woman, she seems to show no signs of self-consciousness while she preaches. In fact, she is sometimes considered to be Eliot's most confident female character.

According to Diana Neill, "The plot [of Adam Bede] is founded on a story told to George Eliot by her aunt Elizabeth Evans, a preacher, and the original of Dinah Morris of the novel, of a confession of child-murder, made to her by a girl in prison."

Dinah's preaching is extremely effective, persuading the exceptionally vain Bess to take off her gaudy earrings -- though only briefly. Her resistance to marriage, because she worries it would curtail her religious teaching, is resolved by Eliot in a manner calculated not to upset the male hierarchy: Dinah was not in fact kept from a traditional marriage by piety, but because no man she truly loved had yet asked her to marry him. Indeed, she turns into a typical housewife by the end of the novel, even consenting to discontinue her preaching because the Methodist men have decided against it.
