= Metamorphosis (2012 film) =

- Directed by: Chris Swanton
- Written by: Chris Swanton
- Produced by: Chris Swanton; Lesley McNeil
- Cinematography: John Daly
- Edited by: Chris Toft
- Production companies: Attractive Features Ltd and Rockkiss Digital Media Entertainment Ltd
- Distributed by: Attractive Features Ltd
- Release date: 31 August 2012 (Montréal World Film Festival)
- Running time: 85 minutes
- Country: United Kingdom
- Language: English

Metamorphosis is a 2012 feature film adaptation of Franz Kafka's classic 1915 novella Die Verwandlung (The Metamorphosis), adapted and directed by Chris Swanton. To celebrate the first publication of Franz Kafka's iconic novella in book form in 1916, the film's London-based production company, Attractive Features Ltd, has brought out this Centenary Edition with new CGI, the addition of a narrator (Tim Pigott-Smith) and specially-written opening music. The film's cast leads with Maureen Lipman, and Robert Pugh, and also stars Laura Rees, Chloe Howman, Alistair Petrie, Janet Henfrey, Aiden McArdle, Paul Thornley, Liam McKenna and is narrated by Tim Pigott-Smith.

== Synopsis ==
Metamorphosis is the story of traveling salesman Gregor Samsa, who wakes one morning to find himself transformed in his bed into a giant, verminous, insect-like creature. His transformation into a hideous parasite is a cry for help, but his craving for understanding and love is not met. His idle teenage sister jealously dominates his care, his hitherto slothful father is bitter about the loss of family income, and his weak and asthmatic mother can only look on ineffectively as Gregor's fate unfolds. Gregor's craving for emotional fulfilment is met by misunderstanding and ultimately physical abuse. He is attacked by his father, who penetrates his insect shell with a vicious bombardment of rock-hard apples and is prevented from killing Gregor only by the desperate intervention of his mother. The sister he has always cherished finally turns on him viciously and demands his disappearance, a demand that Gregor inwardly accepts has to be carried out. Imprisoned in his increasingly neglected room, he wastes away from the lack of the right kind of sustenance and finally dies of the great wound in his back and in his heart. At his death, the brutish charlady sweeps away his remains and his family are released from their dreadful burden to celebrate their prospects for a brighter future.

== Cast ==
- Robert Pugh as Mr Samsa
- Maureen Lipman as Mrs Samsa
- Laura Rees as Grete Samsa
- Chloe Howman as Anna
- Alistair Petrie as The Supervisor
- Aidan McArdle as The First Lodger
- Paul Thornley as the Second Lodger and the Voice of Gregor Samsa
- Liam McKenna as the Third Lodger
- Janet Henfrey as The Cleaning Lady
- Tim Pigott-Smith, Narrator

== Crew ==
- Director - Chris Swanton
- Visual Effects Director - William Rockall
- Producer Lesley McNeil
- Director of Photography - John Daly
- Production Designer -Humphrey Jaeger
- Costume Designer - Christine Rawlins
- Sound Recordist - Tim Humphries
- Art Director - Jenny Ray
- Film Editor - Chris Toft

== Production ==
Attractive Features was set up by film editor Chris Swanton with the express purpose of making the first-ever, English-language film version of Kafka's iconic novella. Rockkiss was established by award-winning visual effects director William Rockall together with visual effects designer and producer, Simon Hodgkiss.

== Release ==
The Academic Edition of the film was released on DVD in January 2014 together with the companion Teacher's Handbook and Student's Textbook. These items have now been withdrawn and replaced by the Centenary Edition, composed of the feature film and the complementary documentary Behind the Scenes as well as the companion paperback with fresh translation and detailed commentary.

== All Showings ==
- Montreal World Film Festival 2012
- B-Movie Celebration Festival 2012
- Ojai Film Festival 2012
- Oaxaca Film Festival 2012
- Sci-Fi London Film Festival 2012
- Houston World Filmfest 2013
- GCSE Drama PMS
