= Chris New =

English actor

- Born: 17 August 1981 (age 45); Swindon, Wiltshire, England
- Education: Royal Academy of Dramatic Art
- Occupation: Actor
- Website: www.chrisnew.net

Chris New (born 17 August 1981) is an English film and stage actor best known for his starring role in the 2011 film Weekend. New made his screenwriting and directorial debut in 2013 with the short film Ticking. He co-wrote the 2015 independent film Chicken, and co-wrote and directed A Smallholding that same year.

== Early life and education ==
New grew up in Swindon, United Kingdom, and comes from a working-class background. His father was a lorry driver, while his mother held various jobs, and New has an older brother. While studying for his A-levels, New performed in Joe Orton's play The Erpingham Camp. He later moved from Swindon to London to attend the Royal Academy of Dramatic Art (RADA), describing the move as a major change from his upbringing. He financed his education through small donations from hundreds of people he knew. While at RADA, New played Charlie Guiteau in Stephen Sondheim's musical Assassins. He graduated from the school in 2006.

== Career ==
=== Early career (2006–2011) ===
New's first professional stage credit occurred just weeks after he graduated from RADA in the summer of 2006, when he appeared as Mosby in the Elizabethan-era play Arden of Faversham at the White Bear Theatre in London. That December, he appeared as Horst opposite Alan Cumming in a production of Bent, by Martin Sherman, at Trafalgar Studios in London. Reviewing the play for The Observer, Susannah Clapp praised New's performance, highlighting his talent and restraint. His performance earned him nominations for the Evening Standard's Milton Shulman Award for Outstanding Newcomer and the WhatsOnStage Award for Best London Newcomer in 2006.

In February 2007, New took on the role of Louis opposite Ben Chaplin in The Reporter, a play by Nicholas Wright, produced by the Royal National Theatre at the Cottesloe Theatre in London. New's performance received positive reviews from David Benedict of Variety and Philip Fisher of The British Theatre Guide, who both praised his portrayal of Louis. In October 2007, New made his Royal Shakespeare Company (RSC) debut as Dromio of Ephesus in a national touring production of William Shakespeare's The Comedy of Errors.

As the tour neared its end, New took on the role of Viola in the RSC's production of Twelfth Night. In Neil Bartlett's production, the female roles were played by men and the male roles by women. New's performance as Viola received mixed reviews, with Charles Spencer of The Daily Telegraph criticising his portrayal, while Michael Billington of The Guardian, David Benedict of Variety and WhatsOnStage praised his performance.

New subsequently starred as Simon Bliss in a July 2008 revival of Noël Coward's 1924 comedy Hay Fever at the Royal Exchange Theatre in Manchester. His performance received positive reviews from Mark Powell of Metro and Alfred Hickling of The Guardian. In December 2008, New appeared as the university student Ricardo in the Young Vic production of Colin Teevan and Paul Heritage's play Amazonia.

In October 2009, New played Joe Orton in the original London production of the dark comedy Prick Up Your Ears. New was also involved in developing the production, having initially approached Matt Lucas about the project. On 23 and 24 April 2010, New appeared as Mussorgsky in the Young Vic production of Pictures From an Exhibition at Sadler's Wells Theatre. New followed up playing Steven in Peter Nichols' play Lingua Franca at the Finborough Theatre in London in July 2010. Critic Michael Billington praised New's casting.

In September 2011, New played the title role in Edward II by Christopher Marlowe at the Royal Exchange Theatre. Alfred Hickling of The Guardian praised New's performance, noting that his portrayal of Edward II inspired pity despite the character's flaws. David Chadderton, of The British Theatre Guide, praised New's performance alongside Samuel Collings, highlighting the chemistry between their characters.

New also made his film debut alongside Tom Cullen in Andrew Haigh's Weekend in 2011. Writing for The New York Times, Karen Durbin identified New as a performer to watch. He was nominated for Best British Newcomer at the 2011 BFI London Film Festival Awards.

=== Later career (2012–2017) ===
In February 2012, New co-starred in a revival of Philip Ridley's 1991 play The Pitchfork Disney at the Arcola Theatre in London. Lyn Gardner, reviewing the production for The Guardian, described New's performance as one of several excellent performances in the play. In 2012, New and playwright Freddie Machin adapted Machin's play Chicken for film. The screenplay was subsequently picked up for production by director Joe Stephenson, with New joining the cast alongside Scott Chambers and Yasmin Paige. New later withdrew from the cast due to scheduling conflicts, although he remained involved as a screenwriter.

New made his cinema directorial debut in April 2013 with the short film Ticking, which premiered at the Nashville Film Festival. In April 2013, New played Andy in Chris Dunkley's play Smallholding at the Nuffield Theatre at University of Southampton. That summer, he directed the play The Precariat at the Finborough Theatre. In February 2014, New reprised his role as Andy in Smallholding when the production transferred to the Soho Theatre.

New returned to cinema in 2015, directing the film A Smallholding, adapted from Chris Dunkley's stage play where he had previously performed. He co-wrote the screenplay with Dunkley, and also acted as its cinematographer and film editor. In April 2015, New's short play A New Play for the General Election debuted under his direction at the Finborough Theatre. New played Tom Wingfield in the Nottingham Playhouse production of Tennessee Williams' The Glass Menagerie in March 2016.

In 2017, New and Mark Edel-Hunt played Daniel Quinn in Duncan Macmillan's stage adaptation of Paul Auster’s City of Glass, which premiered at HOME in Manchester in March before transferring to the Lyric Theatre in London in April. Also in March, New was scheduled to star in a stage adaptation of Tibor Fischer’s short story Portrait of the Artist as a Foaming Deathmonger at the Hungarian Cultural Centre in London. New played pilot Lars Koch in Ferdinand von Schirach’s courtroom drama Terror at the Brisbane Festival in September 2017. Meredith McLean of The AU review and Jo Litson of Limelight both praised New's performance, highlighting his portrayal of Koch's vulnerability and restraint.

=== Present career (2018–present) ===
In 2018, New appeared as a fisherman in Jack Cooper Stimpson's short film Alex's Dream. He also returned to the Royal Shakespeare Company in 2018 to play the Cardinal in Maria Aberg's production of John Webster’s The Duchess of Malfi at the Swan Theatre in Stratford-upon-Avon. In 2019, he worked as unit production manager on the short film Star Eater, directed by D. T. Carpenter. In February 2023, New's play Dig was presented at the Stables Theatre in Hastings, followed by its sequel, Dog Song, which was scheduled for performances at the same theatre that May.

New's play Harvest was also staged at the Stables Theatre in February 2024, while The Power of Love was featured in the local theatre listings of Hastings Independent Press that July. He went on to write and direct Sir at the Stables Theatre in April 2025. Three months later, he presented Follow the Eyes, a work-in-progress one-person show that he wrote and performed. In April 2026, New directed Caryl Churchill's Top Girls at the Stables Theatre.

== Personal life ==
New has spoken openly about his sexuality and the challenges faced by gay actors in the entertainment industry. In a 2012 interview with The Guardian, he recalled being advised by his agent not to discuss his sexuality while appearing in Bent in 2006. Concerned about the impact of being known as a "gay actor" on his career, he discussed the issue with Bent co-star Alan Cumming. Following their conversation, New decided to come out professionally, and entered into a civil partnership in 2011. New has said that, as an individual, he has never been in the closet and has maintained that he had never hid his sexuality.

== Filmography ==
Year	Title	Role or contribution	Ref.
2011	Weekend	Glen (actor)	
2013	Ticking	Writer, director (short film)	
2015	A Smallholding	Co-writer, director, cinematographer, editor	
2015	Chicken	Co-writer	
2018	Alex's Dream	Fisherman (actor; short film)	
2019	Star Eater	Unit production manager (short film)	
