= Tony Kearney =

Scottish actor and TV presenter

Tony Kearney is a Scottish actor and TV presenter. He is best known for playing Scott Wallace in the BBC Scotland soap opera, River City. He previously appeared for six years in Machair, a Scottish Gaelic soap. He narrated the Gaelic version of Meeow!.

== Early life ==
Kearney was born in Stirling and studied an arts degree at the University of Glasgow.

== Career ==
Kearney presented Blasad, a 2010 series on BBC Alba where he speaks with guests about food. Kearney stars in Turas Tony, a 2011 BBC Alba series on where he takes on a number of challenges. These include running a hotel, joining a mountain rescue team, and working as a chef in a restaurant. He has also appeared on Taggart and Wheel of Fortune.

In 2011, Kearney acted in Somersaults, a play written by Iain Finlay Macleod for the National Theatre of Scotland.

In August 2019 he provided commentary for the Scottish broadcast of the Eurovision Choir 2019 contest.

== Radio ==
Date	Title	Role	Director	Station series
28 October 2003	The Time Between Two Tides	Cass	Gaynor Macfarlane	BBC Radio 4 Afternoon Play
8 January 2004	Bampot Central	Jyzer	Lu Kemp	BBC Radio 3 The Wire
29 March 2004	Nude, Untitled	Davey	Lu Kemp	BBC Radio 4 Afternoon Play
8 December 2005	Iona	Andrew	?	BBC Radio 3 The Wire
