= Robert Forrest (dramatist) =

Scottish playwright

Robert Forrest is a Scottish three-time Sony Award winning dramatist (playwright) who has created many radio shows for BBC Radio and a stage play 'Jason and the Argonauts' for children that toured internationally and on Broadway. He has also adapted The Exorcist for BBC Radio 4 (Feb 2014).

== History and personal life ==
Forrest lives in Strathaven, South Lanarkshire, Scotland.

== Radio adaptations ==
- The Exorcist by William Peter Blatty, BBC Radio 4, February 2014
- The Great Gatsby by F. Scott Fitzgerald, BBC Radio 4, 6–13 May 2012
- The Pillow Book by Robert Forrest, BBC Radio 4, 2009–2012
- Journey into Fear by Eric Ambler, BBC Radio 7, 28 February – 4 March 2011
- Adam Bede by George Eliot, BBC Radio 7, 3–17 July 2010
- The Honourable Schoolboy by John le Carré, BBC Radio 4, 24 January – 7 February 2010
- The Secret Pilgrim by John le Carré, BBC Radio 4, 13–27 June 2010
- Smiley's People by John le Carré, BBC Radio 4, 11–25 April 2010
- The Voyage of the Demeter by Bram Stoker, BBC Radio 4, 23 February 2008, 31 October 2009
- Call for the Dead by John le Carré, BBC Radio 4, 23 May 2009
- Daniel Deronda by George Eliot, BBC Radio 7, 27–29 January 2009
- The Spy Who Came in From the Cold by John le Carré, BBC Radio 4, 5–19 July 2009
- The Weir of Hermiston by Robert Louis Stevenson, BBC Radio 7, 20 June 2009
- Parade's End by Ford Madox Ford, BBC Radio 4, 2003
- The Case Book of Sherlock Holmes by Arthur Conan Doyle, BBC Radio 4, 1996
- The Strange Case of the Man in the Velvet Jacket by Robert Forrest, based on Robert Louis Stevenson's early life in Edinburgh, BBC Radio 3, 2011

== Stage shows ==
- Lucia, Fifth Estate, Edinburgh, 1994
- Jason and the Argonauts, Broadway, 2009
- Poem in October, Glasgow and Edinburgh, 2009
- Curse of the Demeter, Glasgow, 2010
