= Chris Dunkley =

British Playwright

Chris Dunkley is an English playwright from Northamptonshire.

== Education ==
Dunkley was awarded a PhD in Performance Practice by the University of Exeter.

== Career ==
=== Theatre ===
Mirita was given a public rehearsed reading at the Royal Court Theatre on 5 April 2001, directed by Sacha Wares. The play received its first full production at the Cherry Lane Theatre, New York in August 2001 and was subsequently produced at the Finborough Theatre in London, 5-30 March 2002, directed by Martin Harvey. How to Tell the Truth was produced at the Stephen Joseph Theatre in Scarborough from 28 January to 15 February 2003, directed by Lu Kemp. Almost Blue, an adaptation of the novella by Carlo Lucarelli, was produced at the Riverside Studios in Hammersmith in November and December 2005, also directed by Lu Kemp.

The Soft of Her Palm opened at the Finborough Theatre in October 2012, directed by Ola Ince. Smallholding was produced at the Nuffield Theatre in Southampton, followed by a run at the High Tide Festival in 2013. It then opened at the Soho Theatre in 2014, directed by Patrick Sandford. The Precariat was produced at the Finborough Theatre in 2013, directed by Chris New.

=== Film ===
Dunkley co-adapted his play Smallholding for the screen with Chris New. Filming was completed in 2013, with New directing and Dunkley producing. New completed the final edit in 2014.

=== Radio ===
Dunkley's radio play, The All-Colour Vegetarian Cookbook was produced for BBC Radio 4 as an Afternoon Play, directed by Lu Kemp. His second radio play, also for BBC Radio 4's Afternoon Play slot, was The Architects, directed by Lu Kemp.

== Publications ==
- The Soft of Her Palm
- Smallholding
- The Precariat

== Accolades ==
Dunkley was a recipient of the 2001 PMA Writers' Award for Mirita and he won the International Student Playscript Competition in 2002 with his play How to Tell the Truth. Almost Blue was the recipient of the Oxford Samuel Beckett Theatre Trust Award in 2005.
