= Museums + Heritage Show =

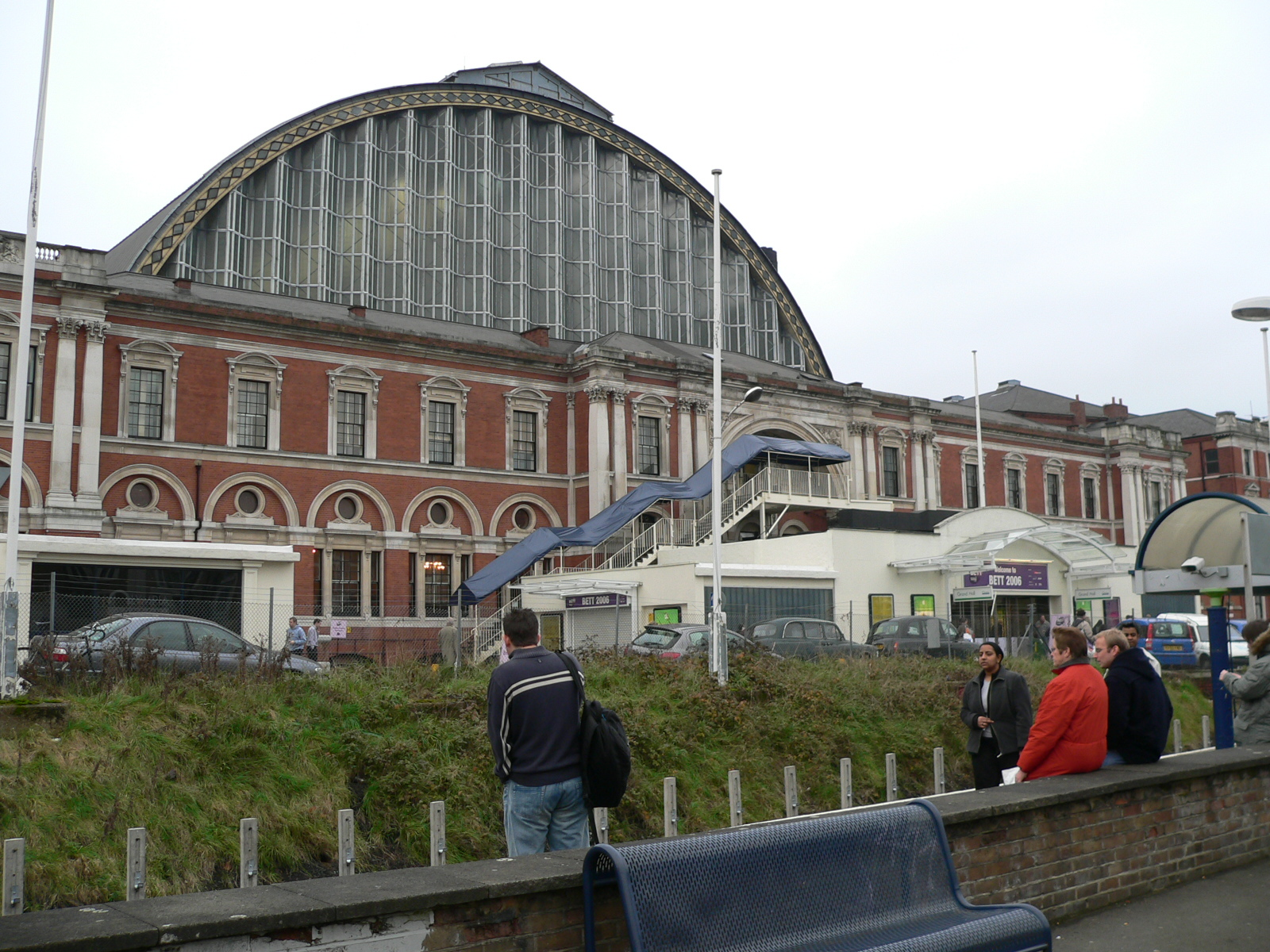
Olympia, London, the location of the Museums + Heritage Show

The Museums + Heritage Show (aka Museums & Heritage Show) is an event in the museum and heritage sectors. The show is held annually and includes awards.

In 2017, the show is held at Olympia West, London, England, during May.
