= Katherine Igoe =

Irish actress

- Born: Katherine Igoe; Laois, Ireland
- Occupation: Actor

Katherine Igoe is an Irish actress.

== Early life and training ==
A native of Abbeyleix, County Laois, Igoe first studied computer science at University College Dublin. Having decided on a career change, she moved to Edinburgh where she trained in acting at Queen Margaret University School of Drama. She graduated in 1996.

== Career ==
Igoe has appeared in a number of TV productions, such as I Fought The Law (2003), Down to Earth (2005) with Ricky Tomlinson and Taggart (1997). She also starred as Maire Brennan in TV3's first home-made drama, School Run, which was nominated for the Best Single Drama award in the IFTAs.

She has appeared extensively on stage in the UK in plays such as The Weir (2003), Daisy Pulls It Off (2002) and Babes in the Wood (2001). Igoe has also worked as a voice actor in BBC Radio productions of Resurrection by Leo Tolstoy (2006–07), The All-Colour Vegetarian Cookbook (2005), Hippomania (2004) and Parade's End (2003).
