= 15 Minute Drama =

BBC Radio 4 Arts and Drama production strand

15 Minute Drama, previously known as Woman's Hour Drama, is a BBC Radio 4 arts and drama production strand that was broadcast between 1998 and 2021. It consisted of 15-minute episodes, broadcast every weekday 10:45–11:00 am (i.e. at the end of Woman's Hour proper), repeated at 7:45–8:00 pm. These tended to be plays which extended over a week, or multiple of five episodes. Occasionally, each day's slot for a week or more would be filled by single drama, linked to the others of the week by a theme. For the last decade of its broadcasting life, the single episodes would be repeated as omnibuses on BBC Radio 4 Extra at the weekend.

The subjects covered were many and varied, and not just for women. According to Radio 4, they aimed to provide a mixture of classic and contemporary drama, adaptations of books and original writing.
