= List of The Omega Factor episodes =

The Omega Factor is a British science fiction television series that aired on BBC One in 1979. Created by Jack Gerson, the series ran for a single series of ten episodes, broadcast between 13 June and 15 August 1979. The show starred James Hazeldine as Tom Crane, Louise Jameson as Dr. Anne Reynolds, and John Carlisle as Dr. Roy Martindale.

== Credits ==
Starring:

- James Hazeldine as Tom Crane
- Louise Jameson as Dr. Anne Reynolds
- John Carlisle as Dr. Roy Martindale

Recurring:

- Brown Derby as Scott-Erskine (eps. 1, 3–4, 6, 8–10)
- Natasha Gerson as Morag (eps. 1–5)
- Nicholas Coppin as Michael Crane (eps. 1–3, 5, 8)
- Series Created by: Jack Gerson
- Producer: George Gallaccio
- Title Music: Anthony Isaac
- Script Editor: Maggie Allen

This is a list of all The Omega Factor episodes.

== Episode list ==
Episode	Title	Transmission date	Writer	Director	Guest cast
1	The Undiscovered Country	13 June 1979	Jack Gerson	Paddy Russell	Cyril Luckham (as Edward Drexel); Colin Douglas (as Alfred Oliphant); Joanna Tope (as Julia Crane)
2	Visitations	20 June 1979	Eric Macdonald	Norman Stewart	Jake D'Arcy (as Paul); Martin Cochrane (as Doctor)
3	Night Games	27 June 1979	Nick McCarty	Ken Grieve	Tim Barlow (as Brigadier); Tony Haygarth (as Corporal Clark) Jim Reid Boyce (as sergeant)
4	After-Image	4 July 1979	Sean Hignett	Gerald Blake	Cyril Luckham (as Edward Drexel); Bruce Boa (as Masson); Joanna Tope (as Julia Crane)
5	Powers of Darkness	11 July 1979	Anthony Read	Eric Davidson	Maggie James (as Jenny); Simon Tait (as Gavin); Desi Angus (as Alison)
6	Child’s Play	18 July 1979	Tom Wright	Fiona Cumming	Max Harris (as Colin Muirhead); Maureen Morris (as Karen Muirhead)
7	St Anthony’s Fire	25 July 1979	Eric Macdonald	Norman Stewart	William Wilde (as Graham Hobb); Jean Gilpin (as Sarah Ashley); Victor Carin (as Kellerman); Michael MacKenzie (as Bob MacKenzie)
8	Out of Body, Out of Mind	1 August 1979	Anthony Read	Peter Grimwade	Loftus Burton (as Hamish Mboto); Charles Lloyd-Pack (as Sir Willoughby)
9	Double Vision	8 August 1979	Sean Hignett	Kenny McBain	Philip Locke (as Vashrevsky); Joanna Tope (as Julia Crane)
10	Illusions	15 August 1979	Jack Gerson	George Gallaccio	Edith MacArthur (as Mrs. Arden); Frederick Jaeger (as Raglan); John Gabriel (as Dr. Karl Bruckner); Willie Joss (as Night Clerk)
