= Eilidh McCreadie =

Radio drama director & producer

Eilidh McCreadie (/ˈeɪli məˈkrɛdi/) is a radio drama director and producer for BBC Radio Drama at Pacific Quay, Glasgow. She directed two episodes of The No. 1 Ladies' Detective Agency broadcast on Christmas Day 2009, and four further episodes (ninth and tenth series) in 2014–15.

== Radio Plays ==
Radio Plays Directed or Produced by Eilidh McCreadie
Date first broadcast	Play	Author	Cast	Synopsis Awards	Station Series
19 December 2005 – 30 December 2005	The Inn at the Edge of the World	Alice Thomas Ellis abridged by Alison Joseph	Read by Alexandra Mathie	Five guests are drawn to a remote Scottish island, all seeking an escape over the Christmas season. However, the island isn't the idyllic haven they had hoped for.	BBC Radio 4 Book at Bedtime
20 February 2006	One for the Road: I Hope that I Don't Fall in Love with You	Kathryn Heyman	Read by Federay Holmes	A newspaper headline triggers unhappy memories for a barmaid in a story about love and betrayal in the Australian Outback.	BBC Radio 4 Afternoon Reading
21 February 2006	One for the Road: The Telegram	Charlotte Hobson	Read by John Kazek	Only a person with a real taste for the macabre, a self-destructive streak, would choose to drink down at the railway station...	BBC Radio 4 Afternoon Reading
22 February 2006	One for the Road: RSI	Bill Duncan	Read by John Buick	Rumours fly around a North-East fishing village as The Creator seems to succumb to the illness that took his father – but could there be a simpler explanation?	BBC Radio 4 Afternoon Reading
23 February 2006	One for the Road: Are You Lonely	Will Napier	Read by Paul Birchard	Vince might have problems but at least he's found a novel source of income. However, as last orders are called, he is about to face the consequences of his actions.	BBC Radio 4 Afternoon Reading
24 February 2006	One for the Road: There's a Fine Line between an Elvis Suit and a Babygro	Denise Mina	Read by Gabriel Quigley	Ellie is on a long-awaited trip to Manchester. She's relaxed, confident and looking forward to seeing her sister. Everything would be perfect if only the man in the seat opposite would calm down.	BBC Radio 4 Afternoon Reading
25 March 2007 – 22 April 2007	Trouble with Lichen	John Wyndham	Read by Joanna Tope	Biochemist Diana Brackley makes a discovery which could change the course of humanity.	BBC Radio 7
10 September 2007 – 14 September 2007	Above Suspicion	Helen MacInnes	Read by Emma Currie	As Europe teeters on the brink of World War II, a naïve young British couple are swept into the unfamiliar world of espionage.	BBC Radio 7 Crime and Thrillers
30 June 2008	SOS: Save Our Souls – Signing	Alison Joseph	Read by Natalie Bennett	A series of stories inspired by the international Morse Code distress call, "SOS – Save Our Souls". A court interpreter is being sent unexpected signals – but will she choose to acknowledge them?	BBC Radio 4 Afternoon Reading
1 July 2008	SOS: Save Our Souls – The Longsight Branch	Paul Magrs	Read by Laura Smales	Short stories to mark the 100th anniversary of the international distress call. This quirky tale of friendship and survival is set in the squirrel community in the trees high above Manchester.	BBC Radio 4 Afternoon Reading
2 July 2008	SOS: Save Our Souls – Ghosts	Colette Paul	Read by Barbara Rafferty	Short stories to mark the 100th anniversary of the international distress call. A retired woman is jolted out of her comforting routine by the intrusion of a voice from her past.	BBC Radio 4 Afternoon Reading
3 July 2008	SOS: Save Our Souls – The Fishwife's Lament	Stuart MacBride	Read by Lisa Gardner	Short stories to mark the 100th anniversary of the international distress call. An elderly fish-gutter spins an unconvincing yarn in this darkly humorous tale of murder, deception and ice cream.	BBC Radio 4 Afternoon Reading
4 July 2008	SOS: Save Our Souls – The Weight of the Earth and the Lightness of the Human Heart	Linda Cracknell	Read by Ralph Riach	Short stories to mark the 100th anniversary of the international distress call. A climber teeters between life and death on the slopes of a remote mountain.	BBC Radio 4 Afternoon Reading
6 January 2009	The Astronaut	Jason Donald	Read by Iain Robertson	A lethargic jobseeker is distracted from his mission by an old woman in distress, and spies an opportunity to be a heroine in this comic story about success, self-belief and the healing power of white lies.	BBC Radio 4 Scottish Shorts
7 January 2009	The Intelligence of Hearts	Cynthia Rogerson	Read by Paul Young	A touching portrayal of the peculiar solitude experienced in a crowd. Love and loneliness are on the mind of a gallery attendant as he watches the world go by.	BBC Radio 4 Scottish Shorts
8 January 2009	Pillars of the Community	Anneliese Mackintosh	Read by Natalie Bennett	Three flatmates endure the dinner party from hell, hosted by neighbours who may be gun-wielding maniacs as well as committed minimalists. This is a story about the lengths to which students will go for a free meal.	BBC Radio 4 Scottish Shorts
20 October 2009	A Glimpse of Stocking: Hold-Ups	Jojo Moyes	Read by Siobhan Redmond	A short story in celebration of 'something shocking' - the nylon stocking. Alice Herring's heart sinks when three men burst into the jeweller's shop where she works. What follows is a heist with a twist, inspiring an unlikely act of heroism.	BBC Radio 4 Afternoon Reading
21 October 2009	A Glimpse of Stocking: The Hostess With The Mostest	Laura Marney	Read by Gayanne Potter	Jill is working on a deregulated bus route in 1984, aiming to get a cash bonus to fund her summer holiday. All that in her way are some curling sandwiches, a top-loading video cassette player, the miner's strike and a malfunctioning suspender belt.	BBC Radio 4 Afternoon Reading
22 October 2009	A Glimpse of Stocking: A Silly Gigolo	Shena Mackay	Read by Joanna Tope	Public humiliation transforms a shy schoolgirl, leading her into a previously unimagined world of rhinestone, show tunes and stocking-clad chorus lines.	BBC Radio 4 Afternoon Reading
9 November 2009 – 13 November 2009	The Magnetic North	Sara Wheeler	Read by Adjoa Andoh	Sara Wheeler journeys to the collar of lands around the Arctic Ocean, searching for the truth behind the perceptions of this "place of greatest dignitie". She examines some of the myths and legends of this sparsely populated area and how preconceptions match up to the reality.	BBC Radio 4 Book of the Week
17 November 2009	One of Us	Julia Butler	Read by Simon Tait	The story of a young asylum seeker, struggling to fit in at school, who comes alive on the football pitch. A poignant tale of new arrivals and old prejudices.	BBC Radio 4 Scottish Shorts
18 November 2009	Fifty-one	Tat Usher	Read by Clare Yuille	Fifty-one, is about lane swimming, growing up and letting go. A driven teenager spends night after night swimming lengths at her local pool, until the arrival of a familiar face makes her question her motivation.	BBC Radio 4 Scottish Shorts
19 November 2009	Miss Bell And Miss Heaton	Janette Walkinshaw	Read by Ann Louise Ross	There is a new Queen on the throne, Europe is rebuilding after the horrors of the Second World War and Jane Bell has some difficult news for her best friend.	BBC Radio 4 Scottish Shorts
25 December 2009	The No. 1 Ladies' Detective Agency: Tea Time for the Traditionally Built	Alexander McCall Smith	Claire Benedict, Nadine Marshall, Ben Onwukwe, Janice Acquah, Mo Sesay, Nyasha Hatendi, Kedar Williams-Stirling, Emmanuel Ighodaro and Anna Bengo	Precious Ramotswe, owner and founder of The No. 1 Ladies' Detective Agency, is about to get in over her head. She's got an important new client from the incomprehensible world of football, but she's on her own as her loyal assistant Mma Makutsi is distracted by the return of a troublesome figure from her past.	BBC Radio 4 Afternoon Play
25 December 2009	The No. 1 Ladies' Detective Agency: The Seller of Beds	Alexander McCall Smith	Claire Benedict, Nadine Marshall, Ben Onwukwe, Mo Sesay, Gbemisola Ikumelo, Beru Tessema, Albie Parsons, Kedar Williams-Stirling, Emmanuel Ighodaro, Tyrone Lewis, Anna Bengo and Nyasha Hatendi	The detectives are embroiled in the murky world of the football cheat as they investigate the recent bad form of the Kalahari Swoopers. But Mma Ramotswe's problems don't end there – she must confront an issue which has been avoided for too long. Could it be the end of the road for the tiny white van?	BBC Radio 4 Afternoon Play
23 February 2010	Elvis In Prestwick	Oliver Emanuel	Read by Laura Fraser	Elvis Presley's only trip to Britain, a brief stopover on 3 March 1960 at a small Scottish airport on his return from military service in Germany. A shy young girl who doesn't even like rock 'n' roll is dragged along to the airport by her best friend, who is determined to catch a glimpse of the American superstar. Taking refuge from the crowds, the girl encounters a handsome stranger in the staff corridor – some weeks later, a letter arrives from America.	BBC Radio 4 Afternoon Reading
24 February 2010	Elvis In Prestwick: Do You Know Where I Am?	Andrew O'Hagan	Read by Finn Den Hertog	A man remembers the moment in 1960, on the concourse of a small regional airport, when his home town first felt connected to the rest of the world.	BBC Radio 4 Afternoon Reading
25 February 2010	Elvis In Prestwick: Don’t Ask Me Why	Ruth Thomas	Read by Sally Reid	Sonia's friend Wendy is knocked down by a car on the day Elvis Presley lands at Prestwick airport. The coincidence plagues Sonia as she contemplates loyalty, growing up and the awful possibility of being left behind by her best friend.	BBC Radio 4 Afternoon Reading
4 May 2010	Come Away, Come Away! – Peanut Butter and Cello	Geraldine McCaughrean	Read by Melody Grove	A young girl from the favela carries an unexpected burden on a cross-city journey.	BBC Radio 4 Afternoon Reading
5 May 2010	Come Away, Come Away! – Daredevil	Michael Morpurgo	Read by James Bryce	A reckless challenge leads to a dark discovery in a tale of nature and brotherhood.	BBC Radio 4 Afternoon Reading
6 May 2010	Come Away, Come Away! – The Beautiful Freedom Cage	Julie Bertagna	Read by Laura Smales	Alam travels from his desolate mountain community to the glittering promise of Europe, where he hopes to learn the true meaning of freedom.	BBC Radio 4 Afternoon Reading
16 August 2010 – 20 August 2010	Scott-land: The Man Who Invented a Nation	Stuart Kelly abridged by Laurence Wareing	Read by Robin Laing	Sir Walter Scott invented the modern novel, began Scotland's tourist industry and was the first celebrity author. His name, image and influence can be seen everywhere; from Scottish banknotes to place names across the globe.	BBC Radio 4 Book of the Week
28 September 2010	The Greengrocer's Apostrophe: Penny's from Heaven	Anneliese Mackintosh	Read by James Anthony Pearson	Comic tales inspired by those hand-written signs offering "Apple's and Banana's" which can be found in every town in Britain. A quirky story about the apostrophe that ends a relationship.	BBC Radio 4 Afternoon Reading
29 September 2010	The Greengrocer's Apostrophe: Alice, Hanging In There	Ronald Frame	Read by Tracy Wiles	Comic tales inspired by those hand-written signs offering "Apple's and Banana's" which can be found in every town in Britain. When Alice's high-flying career stalls, she finds a novel way to occupy her time. Armed only with a balaclava and a pot of paint, she starts to vent her anger on sloppy punctuation.	BBC Radio 4 Afternoon Reading
30 September 2010	The Greengrocer's Apostrophe: The Sweet Possessive	Diana Hendry	Read by Monica Gibb	Comic tales inspired by those hand-written signs offering "Apple's and Banana's" which can be found in every town in Britain. Distracted by an apostrophe obsession, a woman fails to notice that her lover is not all that he seems.	BBC Radio 4 Afternoon Reading
22 November 2010 – 26 November 2010	Catherine of Aragon: Henry's Spanish Queen	Giles Tremlett abridged by Alison Joseph	Read by Yolanda Vazquez	A compelling account of the life of the Spanish Infanta who became Queen of England, then changed the course of Tudor history by refusing to grant Henry VIII the divorce he needed to marry Anne Boleyn.	BBC Radio 4 Book of the Week
20 December 2010	The Crash	Laura Marney	Julie Austin and Shabana Bakhsh	When Gloria staggers from her damaged car after a collision on a quiet country road, the last thing she's expecting is to have her prejudices shaken to the core. But that's what happens when she pulls a woman in a niqāb from the wreckage of the other vehicle. This could be the start of a beautiful friendship – if only they could meet each other half way.	BBC Radio Scotland Drama
4 January 2011	Fear in a Hat	Nicola White	Read by Sally Reid	A shy schoolgirl fears the worst when she attends a compulsory religious retreat with her catty classmates.	BBC Radio 4 Scottish Shorts
6 January 2011	Matryoshka	Kirsty Logan	Read by Nicola Jo Cully	A spoilt princess craves possession of the one thing she can't have in this new spin on a familiar tale.	BBC Radio 4 Scottish Shorts
28 February 2011 – 4 March 2011	Journey Into Fear	Eric Ambler adapted by Robert Forrest	Read by Richard Greenwood	A late-night encounter with an alluring cabaret artiste in wartime Istanbul begins a series of events turning a mild-mannered engineer's trip into a fight for survival. As he attempts to return to England, he finds himself pursued by Nazi assassins determined to steal the vital military papers he is carrying.	BBC Radio 7
22 March 2011	Census 2011: The Suffragette's Party	Beatrice Colin	Read by Melody Grove	A story about principles and protest as a woman risks the wrath of her family by gathering with fellow suffragettes on census night 1911.	BBC Radio 4 Afternoon Reading
23 March 2011	Census 2011: Everyone Who Lives Here	Kathryn Simmonds	Read by Meg Fraser	Two isolated neighbours bond over the census form in a tale of urban loneliness.	BBC Radio 4 Afternoon Reading
24 March 2011	Census 2011: Realm Of The Census	Louise Welsh	Read by Rebecca Elise	A lonely girl takes a low-paid job, chasing census evaders, which leads to an unsettling encounter in a dark tenement.	BBC Radio 4 Afternoon Reading
11 April 2011 – 15 April 2011	The Warmth of the Heart Prevents Your Body from Rusting	Marie de Hennezel [fr] abridged by Alison Joseph	Read by Alexandra Mathie	French psychologist Marie de Hennezel looks at western attitudes to ageing and asks if we can transform the way we feel about growing old, to make this most feared period one of the best times of our lives. Relating her encounters with extraordinary people who have embraced ageing happily and with grace, de Hennezel guides us through the art of growing old.	BBC Radio 4 Book of the Week
29 August 2011 – 2 September 2011	All Made Up	Janice Galloway abridged by Sian Preece	Read by Janice Galloway	Memories of adolescence in a small Scottish town in the 1970s. Since the death of their father, Janice and her unpredictable older sister, Cora, have lived in close quarters with their downtrodden mother. But the timid child, who has survived by observing rather than acting, is about to hit adolescence.	BBC Radio 4 Book of the Week
11 October 2011	Grand	Robert Forrest	Kevin Guthrie, Kathryn Howden, Brian Pettifer and Sean Scanlan	Joy-riding, bevvying, hooliganism... An old man is horrified by the mess that his family have made of their lives. He decides to give the younger generation one last chance to turn things around.	BBC Radio Scotland Drama
14 December 2011	The Lamp	Linda Cracknell	Ellie Haddington, Fraser James and Ralph Riach	In a remote Scottish library, a farmer's widow and a visiting Kenyan librarian bond unexpectedly over a shared love of books. Recorded on location at Innerpeffray Library in Perthshire, a museum celebrating Scotland's first public lending library.	BBC Radio 4 Afternoon Play
5 February 2014	The No. 1 Ladies' Detective Agency: The Modern Husband Course	Alexander McCall Smith	Claire Benedict, Nadine Marshall, Ben Onwukwe, Adjoa Andoh, Jude Akuwudike, Maynard Eziashi, Eleanor Crooks, Anna Bengo, Steve Toussaint and Janice Acquah	Mr J.L.B. Matekoni embarks on a quest for self-improvement, with a little encouragement from Mma Ramotswe. Mma Makutsi settles into her new house while hiding a secret from her best friend.	BBC Radio 4 Afternoon Play
6 February 2014	The No. 1 Ladies' Detective Agency: The Minor Adjustment Beauty Salon	Alexander McCall Smith	Claire Benedict, Nadine Marshall, Janice Acquah, Eleanor Crooks, Maynard Eziashi, Noma Dumezweni, Steve Toussaint and Alibe Parsons	Mma Ramotswe searches for answers as the campaign against Mma Soleti steps up a gear. Meanwhile the Agency welcomes a new arrival, and an old wrong is finally righted.	BBC Radio 4 Afternoon Play
12 March 2015	The No. 1 Ladies' Detective Agency: The Handsome Man's Deluxe Cafe	Alexander McCall Smith	Claire Benedict, Nadine Marshall, Janice Acquah, Ben Onwukwe, Maynard Eziashi, Jude Akuwudike, Kulvinder Ghir, Sudha Bhuchar and Steve Toussaint	New mother Mma Makutsi expands her business portfolio in an unexpected direction. Meanwhile Mma Ramotswe meets a client with a problematic house guest.	BBC Radio 4 Afternoon Play
13 March 2015	The No. 1 Ladies' Detective Agency: The Dish of Yesterday	Alexander McCall Smith	Claire Benedict, Nadine Marshall, Janice Acquah, Ben Onwukwe, Maynard Eziashi, Jude Akuwudike, Amaka Okafor, Kulvinder Ghir, Obi Abili and Anna Bengo	Mma Ramotswe decides to put her new intern on the case, while Mma Makutsi's distinctive approach to the restaurant business raises eyebrows.	BBC Radio 4 Afternoon Play
