= Paul Birchard =

American actor

- Born: United States
- Occupations: Film, stage, television, radio actor, voice artist
- Children: Ross

Paul Birchard is an American actor who lives in Glasgow, Scotland. He has appeared in film, television, stage and radio productions, most notably as Bud in Sweet Bird of Youth with the Royal National Theatre, Ross in The Goat, or Who Is Sylvia? at the Traverse Theatre, Edinburgh, and Chuck in the premiere of Frank Grimes's first performed play, The Fishing Trip. Birchard is also known for his one-man stage adaptation of F. Scott Fitzgerald stories, a documentary film about Tennessee Williams and Konrad Hopkins which he produced and directed, and a song promoting the Glasgow Diamonds American football team.

== Early life and education ==
Birchard grew up in Los Angeles, California, where he saw Henry Fonda acting and directing stage performances, including The Time of Your Life in 1972. He moved to the United Kingdom, and in 1981 graduated with a Diploma in Dramatic Art from the Royal Scottish Academy of Music and Drama in Glasgow, Scotland.

== Career ==
During the 1980s, Birchard worked as a DJ at Radio Clyde, and appeared in various stage performances including supporting roles in a touring production of The Entertainer, and pantomime.

In 1986 he wrote and recorded the song "Diamonds Rap (We Are The Diamonds)", promoting the Glasgow Diamonds American football team. CBS Sports created a video package called the "CBS Video Bowl" for the half-time interval of their worldwide broadcast of the Super Bowl in January 1987, and in a countdown from seven to one, "Diamonds Rap (We Are The Diamonds)" beat more polished rap videos by NFL teams to take the top spot.

His career continued to encompass radio and stage roles, as well as appearances on television and in films. In 1991, he appeared at the Warehouse Theatre Croydon, London, in the premiere of Frank Grimes' first performed play, The Fishing Trip. Reviewers commented, "Paul Birchard's macho Vietnam vet Chuck is unexpectedly subtle"; "the riven Pat is set against the brooding force of Paul Birchard's Chuck - who conveys menace with the minimum of histrionics."

In 1994, he adapted five of F. Scott Fitzgerald's Pat Hobby Stories into a one-man show at the Riverside Studios, London, in which he "used his broad acting talent to impersonate characters like the brash producer to the effeminate hairdresser ... The American actor's storytelling ability is so vivid that the very few props he uses - telephones, typewriters and Time magazines - are hardly needed to boost the imagination." A reviewer in The Times considered that the stories were "not F. Scott Fitzgerald at his best ... frankly, five is a handful too many. ... The fault does not really lie with Birchard's performance ... he plays numerous parts adeptly, flicking from Hobby's wannabe Sam-Spade suavity to a cute-talking broad. He conveys character simply, with a jutting jaw or a seductive finger." Two years later, he took the show to the Dublin Fringe Theatre Festival, and in 2019, performed it at the Edinburgh Fringe Festival.

Some of his most notable roles have been at the National Theatre. He also played Benjamin's father in the London run of The Graduate. Birchard's more recent roles have been in Inherit the Wind at the Old Vic in London, where he played the town mayor and was understudy to Kevin Spacey. In Edward Albee's The Goat, or Who Is Sylvia? at the Traverse Theatre, Edinburgh, Birchard played Ross. The Guardian reviewer said, "Superb performances from Sian Thomas, John Ramm, Paul Birchard and Kyle McPhail do tremendous justice to an unnerving play", while The Stage wrote "the four-strong cast put in near definitive performances ... Paul Birchard is lugubrious longest-serving friend, Ross ... Ross’s gleeful delight in the idea of an affair is a superbly-judged precursor to his horror at the enormity of the reality."

On radio, he has been a regular guest on the Eddie Mair Live show on Radio Scotland in the early 1990s, and appeared in BBC Radio 4 plays and readings in the 1990s and 2000s. He also provided the voice over for 1998 computer game Plane Crazy, as well as the voice of one of the main characters in Crysis 2 in 2011.

On television, he appeared in a number of BBC 2 plays, including a drama about Buddy Holly in 1989, presented the World League of American Football on Scottish TV, and appeared in Spooks as a rogue CIA operative.

Birchard produced, directed and appeared in the feature-length documentary film U & Me & Tennessee: An American Romance..., which deals with a romance by correspondence between playwright Tennessee Williams and Konrad Hopkins. This film was an official selection at the 2007 Raindance Film Festival and at the Sydney Mardi Gras Film Festival.

== Selected stage performances ==
Year	Title	Author	Theatre	Role	Director
1988	Death of a Salesman	Arthur Miller	Royal Lyceum Theatre, Edinburgh		Ian Wooldridge
1991	The Fishing Trip	Frank Grimes	Warehouse Theatre Croydon	Chuck	Lindsay Anderson
1993	True West	Sam Shepard	Tron Theatre, Glasgow	Saul Kimmer	Eve Jamieson
1994	The Pat Hobby Stories	F. Scott Fitzgerald	Riverside Studios, London W6	one-man show	
1994	Sweet Bird of Youth	Tennessee Williams	Lyttelton Theatre, London - Royal National Theatre	Bud	Richard Eyre
1994	Johnny on a Spot	Charles MacArthur	Olivier Theatre, London - Royal National Theatre	McClure; Sergeant of State Troopers	Richard Eyre
1996	The Pat Hobby Stories	F. Scott Fitzgerald	Bewleys Theatre, Dublin	one-man show	
2009	Inherit the Wind	Robert E. Lee and Jerome Lawrence	Old Vic, London	Mayor	Trevor Nunn
2010	The Goat, or Who Is Sylvia?	Edward Albee	Traverse Theatre, Edinburgh	Ross	Dominic Hill
2015	Death of a Salesman	Arthur Miller	Royal Shakespeare Company, Stratford-upon-Avon; Noël Coward Theatre, London	Older Waiter	Gregory Doran

== Filmography ==
=== Film ===
- 1985: King Solomon's Mines – German on Train (uncredited)
- 1989: Batman – Another Reporter
- 1990: Memphis Belle – Lieutenant
- 1992: La mansión de los Cthulhu – Billy
- 1998: Sista Kontraktet (The Last Contract) – Bertram Norris
- 1999: Gregory's Two Girls – American Executive
- 2001: The Tailor of Panama – Joe
- 2001: The Fourth Angel – Pilot
- 2001: Revelation – General Demolay
- 2003: Quicksand – F.B.I. Man
- 2003: Solid Air – Chris
- 2003: The Jacket – Doctor
- 2005: The White Countess – Company Director
- 2006: Alien Autopsy – Senior TV Exec
- 2007: 1408 – Mr. Innkeeper
- 2008: The Dark Knight – Cop with Fat Thug
- 2011: Hanna – Bob
- 2012: Outpost: Black Sun – Cains
- 2012: The Angels' Share – North American Bidder
- 2012: Love Bite – Reverend Lynch
- 2016: Fantastic Beasts and Where to Find Them – Hobo
- 2019: Les Temps De Marguerite – Ernest Hemingway

=== TV ===
Year	Title	Writer	Role	Notes
1989	Words of Love	Philip Norman	Tommy Allsup	BBC 2 Screen Two
1991, 1992	Absolute Hell	Rodney Ackland		BBC 2 Performance
2004	A Line in the Sand (TV Movie)		Littelbaum	
2007	Waterloo Road		Jerry Preston	2 episodes

== Radio ==
Date	Title	Role	Director	Station
1991	Dracula		Hamish Wilson	BBC Radio 4 (7 episodes)
April 1999	Full Moon			BBC Radio 4 (4 episodes)
21 May 2001	The Sea Warrior by Leila Aboulela			BBC Radio 4 Afternoon Play
3 December 2002	Maigret: A Man's Head		Ned Chaillet	BBC Radio 4 Afternoon Play
23 February 2006	One for the Road: Are You Lonely	Reader	Eilidh McCreadie	BBC Radio 4 Afternoon Reading

== Personal life ==
Birchard is a lifelong devotee of Meher Baba. He has four children, including Ross Matthew Birchard, who produces music as Hudson Mohawke.
