= Tom Service =

Scottish classical music presenter and journalist (born 1976)

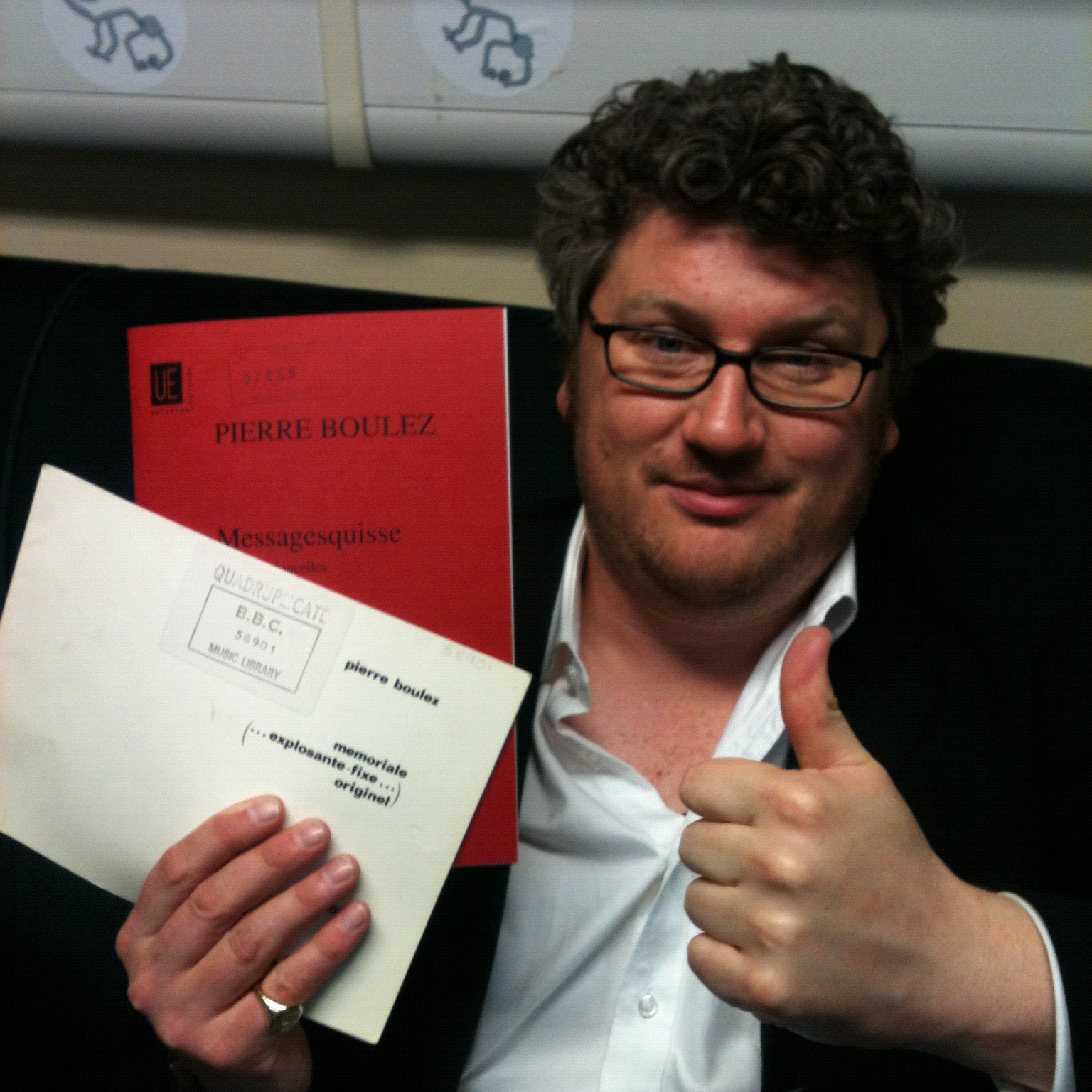
- Born: 8 March 1976 (age 50); Glasgow, Scotland
- Education: University of York, University of Southampton
- Occupations: Writer; journalist; radio presenter; television presenter
- Years active: 2001–present
- Spouse: Alina Ibragimova (m. 2015; div. 2018)
- Family: Joanna Tope

Tom Service (born 8 March 1976) is a Scottish writer, music journalist, and television and radio presenter. He has written regularly for The Guardian since 1999 and presented on BBC Radio 3 since 2001. He is a regular presenter of the Proms for Radio 3 and has presented several documentaries on classical music.

== Early life ==
Service was born in Glasgow and attended Kelvinside Academy, where he learned cello and piano.

Service studied music at the University of York, then studied for a masters in music at the University of Southampton. He wrote his PhD thesis on American composer and musician John Zorn.

== Career ==
=== Broadcasting ===
Service joined BBC Radio 3 in 2001 presenting Hear and Now, and from 2003 he has presented Music Matters. From 2016, he started presenting a weekly show also on Radio 3, called The Listening Service, which drew comparisons to David Munrow's programme Pied Piper, which aired on the same station in the 1970s

Since 2011 Service has presented the Proms, broadcast on Radio 3, from the Royal Albert Hall and Cadogan Hall, as well as presenting special editions of The Listening Service in 2017 exploring the musical pathways between featured composers and the BBC Proms Guide.

In 2014 Service made the first of a series of documentaries with historian Amanda Vickery, produced by Reef Television for the BBC, titled Messiah at the Foundling Hospital. The programme received mixed reviews with The Daily Telegraph criticising the delivery of both presenters and its inaccuracies and The Arts Desk being very positive. A second film, La traviata: Love, Death and Divas followed in 2016. The third film, also in 2016 with Amanda Vickery, was the documentary Leningrad & the Orchestra that Defied Hitler for BBC Two about the extraordinary circumstances surrounding the performance of Symphony No. 7 (Leningrad Symphony) by Dmitri Shostakovich.

In 2015 Service wrote and presented The Joy of Mozart, a documentary for BBC Four, which The Daily Telegraph described as "joyous" and "richly enjoyable". The film aimed to deconstruct some of the myths surrounding Mozart and the romanticism that has been built around his life and relationships. This was followed in January 2016 by The Joy of Rachmaninoff, featuring Vladimir Ashkenazy, Steven Isserlis and Stephen Hough.

Also in 2016 Service presented a documentary film tribute to Peter Maxwell Davies for BBC 4 called Sir Peter Maxwell Davies: Master and Maverick, described by David Chater of The Sunday Times as “memorable” and with a “lucid commentary”.

=== Writing ===
Since 1999 Service has written about classical music for The Guardian newspaper.

In his 2012 book Music as Alchemy: Journeys with Great Conductors and their Orchestras, he examined music through studies of and interviews with six conductors, each preparing a performance with their orchestra. In a four-star review in The Daily Telegraph, Sameer Raham described the book as "excellent" and an "enthralling study". Suzy Klein of New Statesman also found it to be "excellent", while expressing disappointment that the conductors themselves weren't able to clearly describe "what makes an exceptional, alchemical conductor". The Economist found the interview portions "not particularly rewarding" but said "the book's strength is in its mix of stories and perspectives".

In 2013, Service collaborated with composer and conductor Thomas Adès to write the book Thomas Adès: Full of Noises. Conversations with Tom Service. Opera News described the book as "two hundred pages of brilliant talk" and said of Service that "there's no doubting the intelligence he brings to the project". Classical Music magazine described the conversations as “a great battle of wills and provokes an unapologetically complex book”.

=== Teaching ===
Service was Professor of Music from 2018 to 2019 at Gresham College and has taught at Trinity College Of Music.

== Personal life ==
His mother was the British actress Joanna Tope (1944–2024).

In 2015 Service married Russian violinist Alina Ibragimova, whom he first met while interviewing her for The Guardian. They lived in Greenwich, London. They later divorced.

In 2023, Service married writer and dramaturg Victoria Saxton in Deal Town Hall.
