= Slip-Up =

- Genre: Drama
- Written by: Keith Waterhouse; Anthony Delano
- Directed by: James Cellan Jones
- Starring: Jeremy Kemp; George Costigan; Larry Lamb
- Country of origin: United Kingdom
- Original language: English

Production
- Producer: Graham Benson
- Running time: 95 minutes
- Production company: BBC

Original release
- Network: BBC 1
- Release: 30 December 1986

Slip-Up is a 1986 British television film directed by James Cellan Jones and starring Jeremy Kemp, George Costigan and Larry Lamb. the film recounts the unsuccessful attempts of Jack Slipper to extradite the Great Train Robber Ronnie Biggs from Brazil.

It is also known by the alternative title The Great Paper Chase.

== Cast ==
- Jeremy Kemp as Jack Slipper
- George Costigan as Sergeant Jones
- Larry Lamb as Ronald Arthur Biggs
- Nicholas Le Prevost as Mackenzie
- Tony Doyle as Vine
- Fulton Mackay as McColl
- Barry Jackson as Hitchen
- Desmond McNamara as Lovelace
- Gwen Taylor as Charmian Biggs
- Silvina Pereira as Raimunda
- To-Zé Martinho as Garcia
- Michael Aitken as Hinch
- George Sweeney as Brennan
- Valerie Braddell as Anthea
- Philip Jackson as Purgavie
- Jack Watling as Champion
- Armando Cortez as Flat Superintendent
- Suzana Borges as Lucia
- Julian Curry as Edwards
- Denys Hawthorne as Neill
- Simon Cutter as Benckendorff
- Ian Hastings as Steel
- António Salgueiro as Old Prisoner
- John Flanagan as Monk & McCabe
- Danny Webb as Monk & McCabe
- Alastair G. Cumming as Australian
- Adelaide João as Family in Favela
- António Évora as Family in Favela
- Eustácio de Abreu as Desk Sergeant
- Angela Erreira as Phyllis
- Rui Neves as TV Interviewer
- Lídia Franco as Recepcionist
- Rogério Samora as Desk Clerk
- António Anjos as Taxi Driver
- João Sarabando as Anthea's driver
- Ricardo Luís Macedo as ITN Reporter

== Bibliography ==
- Michael Singer. Film Directors. Lone Eagle Publishing, 2002.
