= Desmond McNamara =

English actor (1938–2022)

- Born: April 29, 1938; London, England
- Died: June 7, 2022 (aged 84); London, England
- Occupation: Actor

Desmond McNamara (29 April 1938 – 7 June 2022) was an English actor on the stage, radio, television and film.

McNamara was born on 29 April 1938 in Hackney, London, to Arthur and Winifred McNamara. He took on National Service in the RAF before becoming a printer. In 1961, he married Pam Bentley, and they had two sons.

From 1966, he trained at RADA before joining Birmingham Repertory Company, then the Young Vic in 1970, then the Royal National Theatre, followed by an extensive theatre career ranging from the lead in Oliver Goldsmith's The Good Natured Man at the Old Vic in 1971 to the part of Merlin in Camelot in 1996.

Films included The Great Paper Chase (1986), Staggered (1994), Shakespeare in Love (1998) and Lucky Break (2001).

Television appearances included Hazell, The Bill, The Adventures of Sherlock Holmes, Fortunes of War, Roll Over Beethoven, and All at No 20.

McNamara died in Homerton University Hospital, Hackney, London on 7 June 2022, aged 84 from pneumonia and influenza. At the time of his death, he was also suffering from dementia.

== Filmography ==
=== Film ===
Year	Title	Role	Notes
1976	Adventures of a Taxi Driver	First Robber	
1994	Staggered	Traffic Policeman	
1994	A Pin for the Butterfly	Crazy Old Man	Credited as Des McNamara
1998	Shakespeare in Love	Crier	
2001	Lucky Break	Arthur	
2006	The Spotter	Mr. Jackson	Short film

=== Television ===
Year	Title	Role	Notes
1970	Nearest and Dearest	Waiter	Episode: "When Love Walks In"
1970	ITV Sunday Night Theatre	Guildenstern	Episode: "Hamlet"
1975	Carry on Laughing	Minstrel	2 episodes
1978	BBC Play of the Month	Eric Swash	Episode: "Flint"
1976–1978	Crown Court	George Mitchell Sgt. Beale	4 episodes
1978–1979	Hazell	Cousin Tel	15 episodes
1979	Charles Endell Esquire	Sleeper Attendant	Episode: "Glasgow Belongs to Me"
1979	Saint Joan	English soldier	Television film
1980	ITV Playhouse	Frank	Episode: "Visitors for Anderson"
1981	Play for Today	Donald Morgan	Episode: "The Sin Bin"
1981	Kinvig	Charley	Episode: "The Big Benders"
1981	Only Fools and Horses	Earl	Episode: "Christmas Crackers"
1982	The Gentle Touch	Micky Scott	Episode: "Vigill"
1983	Jury	John Bannister	13 episodes
1984	The Kit Curran Radio Show	Mr. Bickley	Episode: "Election Fever"
1984	The Adventures of Sherlock Holmes	John Horner	Episode: "The Blue Carbuncle"
1984	Travelling Man	Jimmy Nolan	Episode: "Grasser"
1985	Dempsey and Makepeace	Charlie Wilson	Episode: "Blind Eye"
1985	C.A.T.S. Eyes	Binks	Episode: "Cross My Palm with Silver"
1985	Roll Over Beethoven	Lem	13 episodes
1985	Tucker's Luck	Mr. Wilson	2 episodes
1986	Running Scared	Mick Prescott	6 episodes
1986	Starting Out	Mr. Barnes	2 episodes
1986	Big Deal	Des Parsons	Episode: "Tuppence Coloured"
1986	The Great Paper Chase	Lovelace	Television film
1987	Bergerac	Reporter	Episode: "The Deadly Virus"
1987	A Dorothy L. Sayers Mystery	Padgett	3 episodes
1987	Fortunes of War	Galpin	3 episodes
1987	All at No 20	Frankie	2 episodes
1987	Vanity Fair	Capt. MacMurdo	Episode: "After the Battle"
1988	Hard Cases	Fast Eddie Finnegan	2 episodes
1988	King and Castle	Tony Bates	Episode: "Dim Sums"
1988	Les Girls	Jimmy	Episode: "Old Fruit"
1988	South of the Border	Airport security guard	Episode: #1.2
1989	Close to Home	Puppy owner	Episode: "The Contract"
1988–1989	Streets Apart	Cliff	12 episodes
1990	The Chief	Terry Salter	Episode: #1.4
1990	This Is David Harper	Colin Foley	Episode: "Partners in Crime?"
1991	Five Children and It	Mr. Peasmarsh	Episode: "Episode Two"
1991	Birds of a Feather	Desmond	Episode: "Favour of the Month"
1982–1994	Minder	Gossip Les Reggie	3 episodes
1994	Pie in the Sky	Mr Lowe	Episode: "Endangered Species"
1995	The Plant	Paul	Television film
1995	Wycliffe	Bill Marrack (as Des McNamara)	Episode: "Wild Oats"
1997	Animal Ark	Ernie Bell	Episode: "Goat in the Garden"
1999	Miami 7	Caretaker (as Des McNamara)	Episode: "Take Off"
1999	Maisie Raine	Tom Baker	Episode: "European Forty Five"
1998–2000	Casualty	Bert Tom Logan	2 episodes
2003	The Last Detective	Block	Episode: "Pilot"
2004	Doctors and Nurses	Harry	Episode: "Seeing Stars"
2004	EastEnders	Bob	3 episodes
1988–2005	The Bill	Various	9 episodes
2005	Doctors	Reg Johnson	Episode: "The Hand That Feeds You"
