= Staggered (film) =

- Directed by: Martin Clunes
- Written by: Paul Alexander; Simon Braithwaite
- Produced by: Philippa Braithwaite
- Starring: Martin Clunes; Michael Praed; Sarah Winman; Anna Chancellor
- Cinematography: Simon Kossoff
- Edited by: Peter Delfgou
- Music by: Peter Brewis
- Production company: Big Deal Pictures
- Distributed by: Entertainment
- Release date: 8 July 1994
- Running time: 95 minutes
- Country: United Kingdom
- Language: English
- Budget: £650,000

Staggered is a 1994 British romantic comedy film starring and directed by Martin Clunes in his directorial debut. It follows the misfortune of Neil (Clunes), a bridegroom trying to get back to his intended bride after a stag night.

== Plot ==
After his stag night, Neil Price wakes up naked on a remote Scottish island. The film follows his journey back towards his wedding, and the various characters and obstacles he encounters en route. It turns out that Neil's best friend Gary Bicknell spiked his drink and dumped him on the Isle of Barra to enable him to make his own move on Hilary and her well-to-do family.

== Cast ==
- Martin Clunes as Neil Price
- Michael Praed as Gary Bicknell
- Michele Winstanley as Tina
- Kate Byers as Jackie
- Sarah Winman as Hilary
- David Kossoff as Elderly Man
- Helena McCarthy as Elderly Woman
- Sylvia Syms as Margaret
- Sion Tudor Owen as Morris
- Virginia McKenna as Flora
- Jake D'Arcy as Pilot
- John Forgeham as Inspector Lubbock
- Dan Travers as Policeman
- Steve Sweeney as Nutter
- Dermot Crowley as Dr. Barnet
- Anna Chancellor as Carmen Svennipeg
- Bill Gavin as Old Man
- Griff Rhys Jones as Graham
- Julia Deakin as Brenda
- Annette Ekblom as Caroline
- Desmond McNamara as Traffic Policeman
- George Rossi as Waiter
- Paul Brightwell as Longcoat
- Ian Michie as Milkman
- Michael Medwin as Hilary's father
- Neil Morrissey as Jeff the Videographer
- Richard Syms as Vicar
- Gary Murphy as Mr. Elvis
- Amanda Hodge as Mrs. Elvis
- Abigail Hodge as Baby Elvis

== Production ==
The film was Clunes' directorial debut. He said "I was asked, and it's not the sort of thing you say no to, really". It was shot in Barra, Western Isles, Scotland, Kent, London, and Newcastle upon Tyne England in 42 days between 24 May and 5 July 1993.

== Reception ==
Time Out said that the film was a "low-budget farce has a frustrating tendency to set up promising situations only to squander them" but that the project was "amusing and eventful, none the less". The review in Variety had a similar take, although it singled out Chancellor's character, Carmen, as being the best in the film describing her as having "more dark currents than a buttered bun."

The film opened in the United Kingdom on 108 screens on 8 July 1994 and grossed £245,516 in its opening weekend to take third place.

== See also ==
- Dancing Queen, a British short TV comedy film from the previous year (1993) which also follows the misfortune of a bridegroom trying to get back to his intended bride after a stag night, in which Martin Clunes co-starred.
