= James Hazeldine =

English actor (1947–2002)

- Born: James Anthony Hazeldine; 4 April 1947; Salford, Lancashire, England
- Died: 17 December 2002 (aged 55); London, England
- Years active: 1969–2002
- Spouse: Rebecca Moore (m. 1971)
- Children: 2, including Sam Hazeldine

James Anthony Hazeldine (4 April 1947 – 17 December 2002) was an English television, stage and film actor and director.

== Early life ==
Hazeldine was born the son of a dustman in Salford, Lancashire, where he grew up on a council estate. As a child, he became obsessed with the films of director Elia Kazan. At the age of 11, he found out that Kazan had started his career as an actor and stage manager; he decided to do the same. Following the death of his mother, he left school when he was 15. He was accepted as a student assistant stage manager at Salford Repertory where he soon started taking on small acting roles. Seasons at Liverpool Playhouse, Newcastle Playhouse and Manchester Library Theatre followed.

== Stage work ==
At the age of 20, Hazeldine made his London debut at the Royal Court Theatre in Sloane Square. Initially hired to understudy as Cliff in Look Back In Anger, Hazeldine soon started taking on small roles in Edward Bond's Narrow Road to the Deep North and Early Morning. He worked constantly at the Royal Court during the 1969–1970 season. Spotting Hazeldine's potential, Peter Gill then cast him in his play Over Gardens Out and went on to direct him in Crete and Sergeant Pepper by John Antrobus.

Although Hazeldine was rarely cast in starring roles, he became noted as an honest and truthful actor who after his inductory season at the Royal Court was regularly seen in new plays, like The Old Ones by Arnold Wesker, The Foursome by EA Whitehead and Cato Street by Peter Gill. In 1981, he joined the Royal Shakespeare Company for a season to appear in productions of Troilus and Cressida, Timon of Athens, Richard III and Edward Bond's play The Fool.

In 1984, Hazeldine made his Broadway debut as Sam Evans in Strange Interlude with Glenda Jackson. He returned to New York in 1998 when he played Harry Hope in The Iceman Cometh starring Kevin Spacey. His last stage performance was that of the guilt-ridden Joe Keller in Arthur Miller's All My Sons (2000), praised by John Peter of the Sunday Times as "the subtlest and most harrowing performance of his career."

== Television and film ==
Hazeldine was also a prolific television actor who is probably best known for his role as firefighter Mike "Bayleaf" Wilson in the LWT drama London's Burning. He played the role from 1986 to 1996 and also directed some episodes.

Other major TV roles include that of Frank Barraclough in the 1973–1975 drama series Sam and the role of journalist Tom Crane in the 1979 paranormal thriller series The Omega Factor. He also starred in the children's series Chocky (1984) and its sequels Chocky's Children (1985) and Chocky's Challenge (1986), all scripted by one of The Omega Factor's writers, Anthony Read. In 1983 he played the part of Kidder in Willy Russell's five part Channel 4 drama One Summer, also starring David Morrissey. In the later 1980s Hazeldine had major roles in two BBC comedy dramas: as haulage firm owner Picard in Truckers (1987) and as Bernie in Streets Apart (1988–1989). In 1993 he played Reg Manston in the Heartbeat episode "Bitter Harvest". In 1999, He played Austin Danforth in the ITV drama The Last Train and in 2001 he appeared as Ivan Braithwaite in Adrian Mole: The Cappuccino Years. He also played Ian in series 2 of Fat Friends (TV series).

In September 1996 he directed the Heartbeat episode "Forget Me Not".

Hazeldine also appeared in Granada Television's production of "The Musgrave Ritual", as part of ITV's The Return of Sherlock Holmes series, as Richard Brunton, alongside Jeremy Brett, as well as the Miss Marple story "The Murder at the Vicarage", as Lawrence Redding, alongside Joan Hickson, Paul Eddington and Cheryl Campbell. Shortly before he died, Hazeldine played DI Stan Egerton in the ITV television drama Shipman (2002).

His film credits are less numerous. Hazeldine made his screen debut as Stalin in Nicholas and Alexandra (1971). His credits also include The National Health (1973), The Medusa Touch (1978) and Pink Floyd – The Wall (1982).

== Death ==
Hazeldine was taken ill on 10 December 2002, a day after portraying Sigmund Freud in Christopher Hampton's play The Talking Cure at the Cottesloe Theatre.

He died one week later of an aortic dissection, caused by complications from a triple heart bypass he had received six months earlier. Following Hazeldine's death, Trevor Nunn, director of the Royal National Theatre, described him as "a leading actor of minutely observed truthfulness, comic brio and emotional daring" who "was also a man of infectious enthusiasm, great warmth and humanity who was universally popular amongst his colleagues".

== Stage appearances ==
- Narrow Road to the Deep North (1969)
- Early Morning (1969)
- Over Gardens Out (1969)
- Rosencrantz and Guildenstern Are Dead (1970)
- The Old Ones (1972)
- Cato Street
- The Foursome (1971)
- Three Months Gone (1972)
- Crete and Sergeant Pepper (1972)
- As You Like It
- Troilus and Cressida (1981)
- Richard III (1981)
- The Fool (1981)
- Timon of Athens (1981)
- The Love-Girl and the Innocent (1981)
- Guys and Dolls (1983)
- The Beggar's Opera (1983)
- Way Upstream (1983)
- Schweyk in the Second World War (1983)
- The Importance of Being Earnest (1983)
- The Spanish Tragedy (1983)
- A Map of the World (1983)
- Major Barbara (1983)
- Kick For Touch (1983)
- Small Change (1983)
- A Midsummer Night's Dream (1983)
- Other Place (1983)
- Lorenzaccio (1983)
- The Rivals (1983)
- You Can't Take It With You (1983)
- The Trojan War Will Not Take Place (1983)
- The Fawn (1983)
- One Woman Plays (1983)
- Tales from Hollywood (1983)
- Glengarry Glen Ross (1983)
- Strange Interlude (1984)
- The Daughter-in-Law
- This Story of Ours (1987)
- Chips With Everything (1997)
- The Iceman Cometh (1998)
- All My Sons (2000)

== Partial filmography ==
- Nicholas and Alexandra (1971) – Stalin
- The Ruling Class (1972) – Fraser
- The National Health (1973) – Student Doctor
- Stardust (1974) – Brian
- The Medusa Touch (1978) – Lovelass
- Exchange and Divide (1980) – Kenneth Carr
- Pink Floyd – The Wall (1982) – Lover
- London's Burning (1986; TV pilot movie) – Mike 'Bayleaf' Wilson
- Business as Usual (1988) – Mark
- A Small Dance (1991) – Brian Matkin
- Emma (1996) – Mr Weston
- Eisenstein (2000) – Jack Marshall (voice)
- Harold Shipman: Doctor Death (2002) – Detective Inspector Stan Egerton
