= Streets Apart =

British television sitcom series

- Genre: Sitcom
- Created by: Adrienne Conway
- Directed by: Sue Bysh
- Starring: Amanda Redman; James Hazeldine; June Barry; Desmond McNamara; Julie Saunders; Neil Kagan; Anna Murphy; Michael Elwyn; Diane Langton
- Theme music composer: David Mackay
- Opening theme: "Streets Apart" by Neil Lockwood
- Ending theme: "Streets Apart" by Neil Lockwood
- Country of origin: United Kingdom
- Original language: English
- No. of series: 2
- No. of episodes: 12

Production
- Producer: Sue Bysh
- Running time: 30 minutes
- Production company: BBC

Original release
- Network: BBC1
- Release: 24 October 1988 – 9 October 1989

Streets Apart is a British sitcom written and created by Adrienne Conway which ran for two series between 24 October 1988 and 9 October 1989 and it was broadcast on BBC1. Starring Amanda Redman and James Hazeldine, the series followed the two teenage sweethearts, Sylvia and Bernie are reunited after 20 years of separation and a clear spark between them remains, but the two now lead very different lives.

== Cast ==
- Amanda Redman – Sylvia Grant
- James Hazeldine – Bernie Walters
- June Barry – Jenny
- Desmond McNamara – Cliff
- Julie Saunders – Tiffany
- Neil Kagan – Paul
- Anna Murphy – Mandy
- Michael Elwyn – James (series 2)
- Diane Langton – Rene (series 2)

== Episodes ==
Series	Episodes	Originally released	
Series	Episodes	First released	Last released
1	6	24 October 1988	28 November 1988
2	6	4 September 1989	9 October 1989

=== Series 1 (1988) ===
No. overall	No. in season	Title	Directed by	Written by	Original release date
1	1	"Episode 1"	Sue Bysh	Adrienne Conway	24 October 1988
Bernie, although widowed, has a comfortable home, two happy children and makes a reasonable living as a cabbie. Sylvia is a successful literary agent, owns a flat in an elegant part of London and has a busy social life. All this has taken her a long way from the area of London in which both she and Bernie grew up, but has she really changed so very much?
2	2	"Episode 2"	Sue Bysh	Adrienne Conway	31 October 1988
'Bernie must be told the truth' – but the best laid plans....
3	3	"Episode 3"	Sue Bysh	Adrienne Conway	7 November 1988
Against his better judgment, Bernie is persuaded to lure Sylvia to his house.
4	4	"Episode 4"	Sue Bysh	Adrienne Conway	14 November 1988
Prompted by Jenny, Sylvia decides to visit Bernie, with unexpected results.
5	5	"Episode 5"	Sue Bysh	Adrienne Conway	21 November 1988
Bernie and Sylvia independently arrive at the conclusion that the only way to sort things out would be to spend a weekend alone - together.
6	6	"Episode 6"	Sue Bysh	Adrienne Conway	28 November 1988
The weekend away, when all will be revealed; but not necessarily only what is planned.

=== Series 2 (1989) ===
No. overall	No. in season	Title	Directed by	Written by	Original release date
7	1	"Episode 1"	Sue Bysh	Adrienne Conway	4 September 1989
After their weekend away together everything should be fine – but Bernie is upset and Sylvia is confused.
8	2	"Episode 2"	Sue Bysh	Adrienne Conway	11 September 1989
Gran has good news but Bernie and Sylvia need to talk. When they do, their future seems uncertain.
9	3	"Episode 3"	Sue Bysh	Adrienne Conway	18 September 1989
It looks as though Sylvia has a rival for Bernie's attentions, but then a trip down memory lane brings them closer.
10	4	"Episode 4"	Sue Bysh	Adrienne Conway	25 September 1989
Cliffs sister Rene continues to pursue Bernie, but his thoughts are still with Sylvia. He thinks that she should spend time getting to know his children. Sylvia agrees - but not without some apprehension.
11	5	"Episode 5"	Sue Bysh	Adrienne Conway	2 October 1989
Mandy is playing Bernie up but Rene comes to the rescue! Sylvia makes a discovery and has a visit from a friend from the States. She throws a party - which once again brings home to Bernie the difference in their lifestyles. Despite how they feel about each other, they are still 'Streets Apart'.
12	6	"Episode 6"	Sue Bysh	Adrienne Conway	9 October 1989
Sylvia receives some news which sends her back to Bernie, but his daughter Mandy has other ideas. Sylvia decides she needs to get away from it all.

== Home media ==
To this date, the series has not yet been released on DVD or VHS.
