= New Scotland Yard (TV series) =

British TV police drama series (1972–1974)

- Genre: Crime drama
- Created by: Jack Williams
- Starring: John Woodvine; John Carlisle; Michael Turner; Clive Francis
- Country of origin: United Kingdom
- No. of series: 4
- No. of episodes: 46

Production
- Executive producer: Rex Firkin
- Running time: 50 minutes (series 1); 60 minutes (series 2–4)

Original release
- Network: ITV
- Release: 22 April 1972 – 25 May 1974

New Scotland Yard is a police drama series produced by London Weekend Television (LWT) for the ITV network between 1972 and 1974. It features the activities of two officers from the Criminal Investigation Department (CID) in the Metropolitan Police force headquarters at New Scotland Yard, as they dealt with the assorted villains of the day.

The first three series ran from 1972 to 1973 and starred John Woodvine as Det. Chief Supt. John Kingdom and John Carlisle as Det. Inspector, later Det. Sgt., Alan Ward. But the series, scheduled on a Saturday night, failed to match the ratings of the similar format but more glamorous midweek counterpart from Thames, Special Branch.

The programme was resurrected for a fourth series in 1974, with an all-new cast headed by Michael Turner as Det. Chief Supt. Clay and Clive Francis as Det. Sgt. Dexter.

LWT were considered to have broken the rules of Saturday night broadcasting by showing a tough police drama in place of entertainment, but it was an inspiration for The Sweeney. Dennis Waterman, who went on to play a lead role in The Sweeney, appeared in a 1973 episode of New Scotland Yard called 'My Boy Robby?'.

The earlier unrelated Scotland Yard film series (1953–61) was made by Anglo-Amalgamated and was first aired on television by the American Broadcasting Company.

== Main cast members ==
- John Woodvine as Chief Supt. John Kingdom (series 1–3)
- John Carlisle as Det. Inspector, later Det. Sgt., Alan Ward (series 1–3)
- Michael Turner as Chief Supt. Tom Clay (series 4)
- Clive Francis as Det. Sgt. Dexter (series 4)

== Critical reception ==
Reviewing the DVD release of series 1,myReviewer.com noted "a fairly hard-hitting police drama even by today's standards"; and DVD compare.net called it " a fascinating issue-led series that is consistently good."

== Episodes ==
Series	Episodes	Originally released	
Series	Episodes	First released	Last released
1	13	22 April 1972	15 July 1972
2	13	13 October 1972	12 January 1973
3	13	23 June 1973	15 September 1973
4	7	13 April 1974	25 May 1974

=== Series 1 (1972) ===
No. overall	No. in series	Title	Directed by	Written by	Original release date
1	1	"Point of Impact"	Tony Wharmby	Don Houghton	22 April 1972
2	2	"The Come Back"	Tony Wharmby	Tony Hoare	29 April 1972
3	3	"Memory of a Gauntlet"	Christopher Hodson	Don Houghton	6 May 1972
4	4	"The Palais Romeo"	Bill Bain	Stuart Douglass	13 May 1972
5	5	"Hard Contract"	Paul Annett	Philip Martin	20 May 1972
6	6	"Shock Tactics"	John Reardon	Patrick Alexander	27 May 1972
7	7	"The Wrong-Un"	Paul Annett	Tony Hoare	3 June 1972
8	8	"Fire in a Honey Pot"	Bryan Izzard	Robert Banks Stewart	10 June 1972
9	9	"Perfect in Every Way"	Paul Annett	Stuart Douglass	17 June 1972
10	10	"The Banker"	James Ormerod	Don Houghton	24 June 1972
11	11	"Ask No Questions"	Oliver Horsbrugh	Lewis Greifer	1 July 1972
12	12	"Reunion"	David Cunliffe	Nicholas Palmer	8 July 1972
13	13	"And When You're Wrong"	Bryan Izzard	Alun Falconer	15 July 1972

=== Series 2 (1972–1973) ===
No. overall	No. in series	Title	Directed by	Written by	Original release date
14	1	"Nothing to Live For"	Bryan Izzard	Tony Hoare	13 October 1972
15	2	"A Case of Prejudice"	Oliver Horsbrugh	Stuart Douglass	20 October 1972
16	3	"A Gathering of Dust"	Bryan Izzard	Don Houghton	27 October 1972
17	4	"Evidence of Character"	Bryan Izzard	Peter Wildeblood	3 November 1972
18	5	"Prove It"	Peter Moffatt	Richard Harris	10 November 1972
19	6	"Shadow of a Deadbeat"	Bryan Izzard	Don Houghton	17 November 1972
20	7	"Papa Charlie"	John Reardon	Stuart Douglass	24 November 1972
21	8	"Error of Judgement"	Oliver Horsbrugh	Victor Pemberton	1 December 1972
22	9	"Two Into One Will Go"	Howard Ross	Alun Falconer	8 December 1972
23	10	"The Money Game"	Bill Turner	Basil Dawson	15 December 1972
24	11	"We Do What We Can"	John Reardon	Tony Hoare	22 December 1972
25	12	"Hoax"	John Reardon	Stuart Douglass	29 December 1972
26	13	"My Boy Robby?"	Paul Annett	Tony Hoare	12 January 1973

=== Series 3 (1973) ===
No. overall	No. in series	Title	Directed by	Written by	Original release date
27	1	"Where's Harry?"	John Reardon	Tony Hoare	23 June 1973
28	2	"Diamonds are Never Forever"	Oliver Horsbrugh	Tony Hoare	30 June 1973
29	3	"Bullet in a Haystack"	Bill Turner	Don Houghton	7 July 1973
30	4	"Weight of Evidence"	Jim Goddard	Andrew Brown	14 July 1973
31	5	"Crossfire"	Paul Annett	Nicholas Palmer	21 July 1973
32	6	"Property, Dogs & Women"	Paul Annett	Stuart Douglass	28 July 1973
33	7	"Exchange Is No Robbery"	Bill Turner	Peter Hill	4 August 1973
34	8	"Daisy Chain"	John Reardon	James Andrew Hall	11 August 1973
35	9	"Don't Go Out Alone"	Bill Turner	Peter Wildeblood	18 August 1973
36	10	"The Stone"	Bill Turner	James Andrew Hall	25 August 1973
37	11	"Monopoly"	Cyril Coke	Stuart Douglass	1 September 1973
38	12	"Rogues Gallery"	Bill Bain	John Lucarotti	8 September 1973
39	13	"Pier"	Cyril Coke	Peter J. Hammond	15 September 1973

=== Series 4 (1974) ===
No. overall	No. in series	Title	Directed by	Written by	Original release date
40	1	"Come-back"	Philip Casson	Peter Hammond	13 April 1974
41	2	"The Trojan Horse"	Colin Cant	Basil Dawson & Frank Williams	20 April 1974
42	3	"Death by Misadventure"	Derrick Goodwin	Peter Wildeblood	27 April 1974
43	4	"For All Their Faults"	Oliver Horsbrugh	Tony Hoare	4 May 1974
44	5	"A Man of His Word"	Oliver Horsbrugh	Peter Hill	11 May 1974
45	6	"All That Glitters"	Bill Turner	Keith Bacchus & Tony Hoare	18 May 1974
46	7	"A Year to Kill"	Philip Casson	Stuart Douglass	25 May 1974
