= Trouble with Lichen =

1960 science fiction novel by John Wyndham

- First edition
- Author: John Wyndham
- Cover artist: Hugh Marshall
- Language: English
- Genre: Science fiction
- Publisher: Michael Joseph
- Publication date: 1960
- Publication place: United Kingdom
- Pages: 189

Trouble with Lichen (published 1960) is a science fiction novel by British writer John Wyndham.

The plot concerns a young female biochemist who discovers that a chemical extracted from an unusual strain of lichen can be used to slow down the ageing process, enabling people to live to around 200–300 years. Wyndham speculates how society would deal with this prospect.

== Plot summary ==
The two central characters are Diana Brackley and Francis Saxover, two biochemists who run parallel investigations into the properties of a specific species of lichen after Diana notices that a trace of the specimen prevents some milk turning sour.

She and Francis separately manage to extract from the lichen a new drug, dubbed Antigerone, which slows down the body's ageing process. While Francis uses it only on himself and his immediate family (without their knowledge), Diana founds a cosmetic spa, and builds up a clientele of some of the most powerful women in England, giving them low doses of Antigerone, preserving their beauty and youth. When Francis finds out about the spas, he erroneously assumes that Diana's motive is profit. Diana's aim, however, is actually female empowerment, intending to gain the support of these influential women, believing that if Antigerone became publicly known, it would be reserved only for the men in power.

After a customer suffers an allergic reaction to one of Diana's products, the secret of the drug begins to emerge. Diana tries to cover up the real source of the drug, since the lichen is very rare and difficult to grow, but when it is finally discovered she fakes her own death in the hope of inspiring the women of Britain to fight for the rights she tried to secure for them.

Francis realises that Diana may not really be dead, and tracks her down to a remote farm where she has succeeded in growing a small amount of the lichen. Diana plans to rejoin the world under the guise of being her own sister, and continue the work she left off.

== Adaptations ==
The BBC Home Service broadcast a 90-minute radio adaptation by Archie Campbell on 26 November 1962, with Rosalie Crutchley as Diana Brackley and Hugh Latimer as Francis Saxover.

A five-part abridged reading of the novel read by Joanna Tope was broadcast on BBC Radio 7 from 29 October to 2 November 2007, and later re-broadcast in 2008, 2009, 2011, 2017, 2019, 2021 and most recently 2022.
