= Chocky (TV series) =

1984 British TV children's series

- Title card
- Based on: Chocky by John Wyndham
- Written by: Anthony Read
- Directed by: Vic Hughes
- Starring: James Hazeldine; Carol Drinkwater; Andrew Ellams; Zoe Hart; Anabel Worrell; Prentis Hancock; Glynis Brooks
- Country of origin: United Kingdom
- Original language: English
- No. of series: 3
- No. of episodes: 18

Production
- Producers: Vic Hughes; Pamela Lonsdale
- Cinematography: Alan Jonas
- Editor: Oscar Webb
- Running time: 30 minutes

Original release
- Network: ITV
- Release: 9 January 1984 – 16 October 1986

Chocky is a 1984 children's six-part television drama based on the 1968 novel of the same name by John Wyndham. It was first broadcast on ITV in the United Kingdom from 9 January to 13 February 1984. Two six-part sequels—Chocky's Children (1985) and Chocky's Challenge (1986)—were later produced. All were written by Anthony Read, directed by Vic Hughes and produced by Thames Television.

While the 1968 novel was set in an unspecified 'near future', the TV adaptation was set contemporaneously in the mid-1980s in Surrey. The Gore family acquire a second generation Citroën CX car which was marketed as being technologically advanced at the time.

== Overview ==
Series	Episodes	Originally released	
Series	Episodes	First released	Last released
Chocky	6	9 January 1984	13 February 1984
Chocky's Children	6	7 January 1985	11 February 1985
Chocky's Challenge	6	29 September 1986	16 October 1986

Chocky was subsequently repeated in a re-edited single episode on 31 December 1984, with a similar single-episode edit repeat of Chocky's Children following on 27 December 1985.

=== Chocky ===
Matthew Gore is an intelligent boy chosen by a mysterious extraterrestrial visitor to be a source of information about life on Earth. As his schoolwork and artistic talent improve dramatically he arouses the suspicion of powerful groups who wish to tap into the amazing fund of knowledge to which he is now party.

=== Chocky's Children ===
A year has passed since Matthew said goodbye to his alien friend, and in the summer holidays he meets Albertine, a mathematical prodigy, with whom he discovers he can communicate telepathically. One day Chocky returns to warn Matthew that they are both in danger. When he returns to tell Albertine, he finds she has disappeared.

=== Chocky's Challenge ===
Chocky hopes, with Matthew and Albertine's help, to help the human race discover cosmic power, which unlike Earth's finite natural resources, will sustain them for as long as the universe itself exists. But their knowledge has aroused a great deal of interest from the military, and they are willing to take drastic action if they don't get what they want.

== Cast ==
The main cast includes:

- Andrew Ellams as Matthew Gore
- James Hazeldine as David Gore
- Carol Drinkwater as Mary Gore
- Ed Bishop as Dr Deacon
- Zoe Hart as Polly Gore
- Anabel Worrell as Albertine Meyer
- Prentis Hancock as Arnold Meyer
- Glynis Brooks as the voice of Chocky

== Overseas transmissions ==
The series was also broadcast and popular in Czechoslovakia where it was dubbed in both Czech and Slovak languages. It was also dubbed in French and broadcast in Canada in the late 1980s and early 1990s; in Spanish and broadcast in Spain in the late 1980s. It was hugely popular in Bulgaria in the second half of 1980s. Also in Cuba. All episodes of Season 1 and Season 2 were shown numerous times. It was also broadcast in The Netherlands and Sweden with subtitles.

== Video release ==
The re-edited single episode of Chocky, originally broadcast at the end of 1984, was released on VHS by Thames Video in July 1985.

== Home media ==
The complete Chocky saga was available on DVD (all-region PAL, UK) from Second Sight. Revelation Films re-released the whole series in August 2010.

== Theme music ==
The theme music from Chocky is known as Coral and is taken from the 1982 library music album entitled Red Kite by group Astral Sounds. It is track number 4 on side A and was composed by John Hyde. The album was intended to have an underwater feel.
