= Tales from the Hollywood Hills: Pat Hobby Teamed with Genius =

Tales from the Hollywood Hills: Pat Hobby Teamed with Genius is a 1987 American TV movie based on the short story collection The Pat Hobby Stories by F. Scott Fitzgerald. It was written and directed by Rob Thompson.

It was the third and final installment of Tales from the Hollywood Hills, on PBS' Great Performances.

== Cast ==
- Christopher Lloyd as Pat Hobby
- Colin Firth as René Wilcox
- Joseph Campanella as Jack Berners
- Dennis Franz as Louie
- Beverly Sanders as Mrs. Robinson
- Wendy Schaal as Earle
