= Alison Joseph =

English crime writer

- Born: England
- Occupations: Novelist, writer
- Writing career
- Genre: Crime

Alison Joseph is an English crime writer based in London where she was born and raised. She studied French and Philosophy at Leeds University, and started her career as a documentary director, making programmes for Channel 4. The first in her crime series, featuring detective nun Sister Agnes, was published in 1993. She has also written for radio, including adaptations of Georges Simenon’s Maigret. She was Chair of the Crime Writers' Association from 2013 to 2015. The next Sister Agnes novel, The Judas Chalice, will be published in 2024.

== Bibliography ==
=== The Sister Agnes Mystery series ===
- Sacred Hearts, (London: Headline Publishing Group, 1994)
- The Hour of Our Death, (London: Headline Publishing Group, 1995)
- The Quick and the Dead, (London: Headline Publishing Group, 1996)
- A Dark and Sinful Death, (London: Headline Publishing Group, 1997)
- The Dying Light, (London: Headline Publishing Group, 1999)
- The Night Watch, (London: Headline Publishing Group, 2000)
- Darkening Sky, (London: Allison and Busby, 2004)
- Shadow of Death, (London: Allison and Busby, 2007)
- A Violent Act, (London: Allison and Busby, 2008)

=== The Detective Inspector Berenice Killick Mysteries ===
- Dying to Know, (London: Endeavour Press, 2013)

=== Agatha Christie Mysteries ===
- Murder Will Out, (London: Endeavour Press, 2014)
- Hidden Sins (London: Endeavour Press, 2015)
- Death in Disguise (London, Endeavour Press, 2017)
