= The Omega Factor =

1979 British TV series

- This is the main title caption that was seen throughout the series.
- Genre: Drama; Science fiction Horror; Thriller
- Created by: Jack Gerson
- Directed by: various
- Starring: James Hazeldine; Louise Jameson; John Carlisle
- Theme music composer: Anthony Isaac
- Country of origin: United Kingdom
- Original language: English
- No. of episodes: 10 (list of episodes)

Production
- Running time: 50 minutes

Original release
- Network: BBC1
- Release: 13 June – 15 August 1979

The Omega Factor (stylised as The Ωmega Factor) is a British television series produced by BBC Scotland in 1979. It was created by Jack Gerson and produced by George Gallaccio, and transmitted in ten weekly episodes between 13 June and 15 August.

== Synopsis ==
Tom Crane (left) with Drexel.

Journalist Tom Crane (James Hazeldine) possesses untapped psychic powers that bring him to the attention of the scientists of Department 7, a secret "need to know only" government organisation which investigates paranormal phenomena and the potential of the human mind. The phenomena explored include hypnosis, brainwashing, extra-sensory perception, telekinesis, poltergeist phenomena, out-of-body experiences and spiritual possession.

Crane joins Department 7 as a means of finding and getting revenge on Edward Drexel (Cyril Luckham), a powerful rogue psychic who is responsible for the death of Crane's wife in a car crash. Crane's work with the department, and his own psychic gift, lead Crane to suspect a deadly conspiracy by a mysterious organisation called Omega to take over the world using mind control. The members of Department 7 include physicist Dr Anne Reynolds (Louise Jameson), an old friend of Crane's wife, and the secretive head of the department, psychiatrist Dr Roy Martindale (John Carlisle). Most episodes see the driven and impetuous Crane in impatient conflict with the cautious Martindale, with Anne (who falls in love with Crane, though she also has a brief relationship with Martindale) caught in the middle. Various subplots develop over the course of the series – notably Crane's hunt for Drexel, his growing suspicions about the Omega conspiracy and his developing relationship with Anne.

== Episodes ==
Only one series of ten episodes was made. The Omega Factor was produced by BBC Scotland and filmed on location in Edinburgh (making use of a number of Edinburgh landmarks such as the Royal Mile, Holyrood Park, and Edinburgh Zoo), with studio production conducted in Glasgow. Unlike most BBC programmes of the day, the series was shot almost entirely on videotape (as opposed to the then-common practice of using film for exteriors) Recurring guest star Natasha Gerson is the daughter of the show's creator. According to her interview for the 2006 DVD release, she auditioned for the role under an assumed name so that the casting agent was not aware of this relationship.

The series was originally allotted to run thirteen episodes, but to maintain a certain level of quality, the production was scaled back to ten episodes to allow more money to be budgeted per episode.

A novel by Jack Gerson, telling the story of Crane's hunt for Drexel (a substantially different story from that in the broadcast series, aside from the first episode which the novel duplicated faithfully), was published as a series accompaniment.

== Reception ==
The Omega Factor attracted the criticism of public moralist Mary Whitehouse, who described the episode "Powers of Darkness" as "thoroughly evil" because it depicted the supernatural and a man burning to death.

== Legacy ==
The series' combination of science fiction, horror and thriller elements, and its narrative focus on shadowy government departments and conspiracies to gain world domination, as well as the chemistry between James Hazeldine and Louise Jameson's characters, was echoed in the 1990s series The X-Files. Although the final episode resolved several of the subplots, it raised several more issues and its ambiguous ending suggests that a second season was anticipated.

=== Big Finish audio revival ===
In 2015 Big Finish Productions began a series of audio plays based on the TV show, with original cast member Louise Jameson reprising her role as Anne Reynolds. The plays are set 30 years after the events of the TV show and feature John Dorney as Adam Dean (Tom Crane's son). The first volume was followed by a second in 2017, with a third series released in 2018.

==== Series 1 ====
No.	Title	Writer	Director	Released
1.1	From Beyond	Matt Fitton	Ken Bentley	July 2015
1.2	The Old Gods	Phil Mulryne	Ken Bentley	July 2015
1.3	Legion	Cavan Scott	Ken Bentley	July 2015
1.4	The Hollow Earth	Ken Bentley	Ken Bentley	July 2015

==== Series 2 ====
No.	Title	Writer	Director	Released
2.1	Somnum Sempiternum	Phil Mulryne	Ken Bentley	April 2017
2.2	The Changeling	Roy Gill	Ken Bentley	April 2017
2.3	Let the Angel Tell Thee	Louise Jameson	Ken Bentley	April 2017
2.4	Awakening	Matt Fitton	Ken Bentley	April 2017

==== Series 3 ====
No.	Title	Writer	Director	Released
3.1	Under Glass	Roy Gill	Ken Bentley	March 2018
3.2	Let Us Play	Natasha Gerson	Ken Bentley	March 2018
3.3	Phantom Pregnancy	Louise Jameson	Ken Bentley	March 2018
3.4	Drawn to the Dark	Phil Mulryne	Ken Bentley	March 2018

==== Series 4 ====
No.	Title	Writer	Director	Released
4	The House That Wasn't Haunted	Tim Foley	Barnaby Kay	October 2023

==== Audiobooks ====
Title	Writer	Narrator	Director	Released
The Omega Factor: A Novelisation of the TV Series	Jack Gerson	Louise Jameson	Neil Gardner	September 2014
Spider's Web	Iain McLaughlin	Louise Jameson	Neil Gardner	March 2018
Festival of Darkness	Natasha Gerson	Louise Jameson	n/a	July 2019
Divinity	Doris V Sutherland	Louise Jameson	n/a	July 2020
Immaculate Possessions	Natasha Gerson	Louise Jameson	n/a	October 2021

== Home media ==
The Omega Factor UK DVD release

The complete series of The Omega Factor was released by DD Home Entertainment on DVD in Region 2 (UK) on 20 June 2005.

In Region 1, Entertainment One released the complete series on DVD on 2 May 2006.
