= George Gallaccio =

British retired television producer (born 1938)

George Gallacio
- Born: 23 December 1938 (age 86); Brechin, Scotland
- Occupation: Television producer
- Years active: 1970–2015
- Known for: Doctor Who; The Omega Factor; Bergerac; Miss Marple; Alleyn Mysteries
- Spouse: Maureen Morris (m. 1962)
- Children: 2

George Gallaccio (born 23 December 1938) is a British retired television producer who previously worked as a production assistant and production unit manager. His most prominent work was as the producer on two BBC detective drama series, Miss Marple (1985–1992), based on the novels by Agatha Christie, and Bergerac (1988–1991), for which he was the final producer.

== Career ==
Gallaccio began his career at the BBC in the early 1970s. He was the production assistant on Moonbase 3 (1973), which was created by the Doctor Who production team of Barry Letts and Terrance Dicks. He also worked as a production unit manager (PUM), a new role created at the BBC which meant that he was in charge of the budgets on a given production. In this capacity he worked on Doctor Who between 1974 and 1976, and briefly appeared on screen as one of the faces in the mind-bending sequence of The Brain of Morbius (1976), later suggested as an early incarnation of the Doctor by producer Philip Hinchcliffe. He also worked on the BBC's adaptations of David Copperfield (1974–75) and Anna Karenina (1977).

Gallaccio worked as a drama producer for the first time on the six-part serial The Legend of Robin Hood (1975), and later produced two series for BBC Scotland, the supernatural The Omega Factor (1979) and the Andrea Newman serial Mackenzie (1980). He was the BBC management's first choice to produce Doctor Who following the departure of Graham Williams in 1980, but turned it down. He produced several Miss Marple dramas between 1985 and 1992, and between 1988 and 1991, he served as the final producer of Bergerac, the detective drama series set in Jersey.

== Personal life ==
In 1962, Gallaccio married Maureen Morris, an actress. The following year, she gave birth to a daughter, artist Anya.
