= Joanna Tope =

English actress (1944–2024)

Joanna Margaret Tope (14 May 1944 – 19 December 2024) was an English actress who appeared in many television programmes, including Emmerdale Farm as Dr. Clare Scott in 1973, The Omega Factor as Julia Crane in 1979, and The Tomorrow People as Mrs Boswell.

== Life and career ==
Tope was born in Bideford, Devon, England on 14 May 1944. Nominated for a New York Drama Desk Award for Outstanding Solo Performance in The Promise by Douglas Maxwell, which was on at 59E59 Theater New York from 29 March until 17 April 2011, as part of Scotland Week. Appearing in Facade with the Auricle Ensemble in August and September 2011 and was also undertaking radio work for BBC.

After taking an Honours Degree in Drama at Manchester University, Tope spent the next 10 years working in London and the provinces and in both theatre and television, in a variety of parts, allowing her to explore and stretch her versatility. Her roles included Ibsen's Hedda Gabler, Adelaide in Guys and Dolls and the Old Woman in Edward Bond's Bingo. She appeared regularly on BBC Scotland, and has also acted on radio dramas.

At the very beginning of her career she was an ASM and played small parts at Pitlochry. She married a Glaswegian and lived in Scotland.

She appeared at the Citizens Theatre as Jocasta in Oedipus The King and as Helen in A Taste of Honey and as Mrs. Eynsford Hill in Pygmalion. In 1997, she appeared at the Edinburgh Festival as Dorimene in a Scottish Opera/Nottingham Playhouse production of Strauss' Ariadne Auf Naxos and has made numerous concert and cabaret appearances. She was assistant director on The Rising Generation at Theatre Royal, Lincoln.

She died on 19 December 2024, at the age of 80. Tope had three children: John and Maggie and Tom, who is a BBC Radio 3 presenter.

== Stage credits ==
- 2011, Maggie Brodie, THE PROMISE, Random Accomplice/59E59 Theater New York, Johnny McKnight
- 2010, Maggie Brodie, PROMISES PROMISES, Random Accomplice, Johnny McNight
- 2009, Reader, 'FACADE', Auricle, Christopher Swaffer
- 2008, Mary Barfoot, 'REHEARSAL ROOM' READING OF 'AROUSAL', Stellar Quines Theatre Company, Linda Griffiths
- 2007, Various, CLASS ACT, Traverse, Jemima Levick, Lorn Campbell. John Mitchell
- 2006, Agnetha, FROZEN, Rapture, Michael Emans
- 2006, Madame de Rosemonde, LES LIAISONS DANGEREUSES, Royal Lyceum Edinburgh, John Dove
- 2005, Aunt Rose, BABY DOLL, Citizens Theatre, Jeremy Raison
- 2005, Storyteller 7 and five characters, CHRISTMAS CAROL, Royal Lyceum Theatre, Edinburgh, Jemima Levick
- 2005, Valda Trevlyn, THE BEST SNOW FOR SKIING, Playwrights Studio Scotland, David Ian Neville
- 2004, Linda Loman, DEATH OF A SALESMAN, Royal Lyceum Theatre, Edinburgh, John Dove
- 2004, Granny Betty, SWANSONG, Tron. Rehearsed Reading, Lucy Jameson
- 2004, Mother, THE UNCONQUERED. A REHEARSED READING, Stellar Quines Theatre Company, Muriel Romanes
- 2003, Lea de Lonval, CHERI, Citizens' Theatre Company, Philip Prowse
- 2003, Aquilina's Maid, VENICE PRESERVED, Citizen's Theatre, Philip Prowse
- 2003, E. M. Ashford, WIT, Stellar Quines Theatre Company, Gaynor Macfarlane
- 2000, Mrs Christie, 10 RILLINGTON PLACE, Kenny Miller
- 2000, Mrs Bradman, BLITHE SPIRIT, Citizens Theatre, Philip Prowse
- 2000, Aase/Solveig, PEER GYNT, Citizens Theatre, Clare Venables
- 1999, Connie/Cook, CAVALCADE, Citizens Theatre, Philip Prouse
- 1999, Mrs Eynsford-Hill, PYGMALION, Citizens Theatre, Philip Prouse
- 1997, Dorimene, LE BOURGEOIS GENTILHOMME/ARIADNE AUF NAXOS, Nottingham Playhouse Theatre, Martin Duncan*

== Radio credits ==
- 2011, Reader, RADIO 4 SHORT STORY. LIDO LOVER, BBC, Gaynor Macfarlane
- 2011, Various, RADIO WORKSHOP, BBC Radio drama, Kirsteen Cameron and Eilidh McCreadie
- 2010, Rose, LEGACY, BBC7 and Radio Scotland, David Ian Neville
- 2010, Mme Harnaud, SUNDAY, BBC Radio 4 Afternoon Play, Patrick Rayner
- 2009, Reader, A GLIMPSE OF STOCKING, BBC Radio4, Eilidh McCreadie
- 2009, Khatira, BLUE WATER IN HELMAND, BBC Scotland, Bruce Young
- 2009, Emma Fairchild, MCLEVY, BBC Radio 4, Patrick Rayner
- 2009, Reader, AFTERNOON STORY. THE LARK, BBC Radio 4, Kirsteen Cameron
- 2009, Reader, THE RAILWAY CHILDREN, BBC Radio 4, Gaynor Macfarlane
- 2008, Marta, WOMAN'S HOUR SERIAL. AN EXPERT IN MURDER, BBC Radio 4, Gaynor Macfarlane
- 2008, Reader, GET LOST. SHORT STORY, BBC Radio 4, Kirsteen Cameron
- 2008, Reader, BOOK OF THE WEEK. MY FATHER'S COUNTRY, BBC Radio 4, Kirsty Williams
- 2008, Aurora and the Cook, LAURA, BBC Radio4, Bruce Young
- 2008, Trolley girl and Townspeople, THE SWITCH, BBC Radio 3. The Wire, David Jackson Young
- 2008, Brenda, NEVER THE BRIDE, BBC7, David Jackson Young
- 2007, Reader, A VIEW FROM THE CARPET, BBC Radio 4, David Jackson Young
- 2007, Dr Hirst / Nora Hull, DOVER BEATS THE BAND, BBC Radio 4, David Ian Neville
- 2007, Reader, HOUSEWORK, BBC Radio 4, Kirsty Williams
- 2007, Reader, IMAGINE, BBC Radio 4, Kirsty Williams
- 2007, Vera, RESURRECTION, BBC Radio 4, Lu Kemp
- 2007, Queen Caroline, THE HEART OF MIDLOTHIAN, BBC Radio 4, Bruce Young
- 2007, Reader, THE TROUBLE WITH LICHEN, BBC 7 / 7th Dimension, Eilidh McCreadie
- 2006, Rachel, ISLAND BLUE, BBC Radio 4 Woman's Hour Serial, David Ian Neville
- 2006, Joan, KAFFIR LILIES, BBC Radio 4, Bruce Young
- 2006, Mrs Maxwell, KITTY ELIZABETH MUST DIE, BBC Radio 3 The Wire, Lu Kemp
- 2005, Noreen and Mrs Fish, DOVER AND THE CLARET TAPPERS, Radio 4, David Ian Neville
- 2005, Mrs Newage, THE RECEPTIONIST, Radio 4, Lu Kemp
- 2004, Tamara Graham, BENEDICT'S RULE, BBC Radio 4, Gaynor Macfarlane
- 2004, Adelheid Turkheimer, BERLIN, BBC Radio 4, David Jackson Young
- 2004, Beth, GHOST ZONE, BBC 7, Bruce Young
- 2004, Concierge, HIMMLER'S BOY, BBC Radio 3, Patrick Rayner
- 2004, Sybil Shade, PALE FIRE, BBC Radio 3, Patrick Rayner
- 2004, Reader, SHORT STORY - ONE SIZE FITS ALL, BBC Radio 4, Bruce Young
- 2003, Voice of the River, DART, BBC Radio 4, Gaynor Macfarlane
- 2003, Reader, GENESIS, BBC Radio 4, Lu Kemp
- 2003, Reader, THE SWIMMING LESSON, BBC Radio 4, Bruce Young
- 2002, Reader, THE BODY ON THE BEACH, Book At Bedtime Radio 4, David Jackson Young
- 2001, Sebastiana, BALTHAZAR & BLIMUNDA, Radio 3, Patrick Rayner
- 2001, Reader, FLOWER O'THE QUINCE, Radio 4, Julia Butt
- 2001, Mme Thireau, MURDER MYSTERY, BBC Radio, Bruce Young
- 2001, Dr Gall, ROSSUM'S CYBER CAFE, Radio 3, Dave Bachelor
- 2001, Psychologist, THE HAUNTING, BBC Radio, Dave Bachelor
- 2001, Reader, THE MONUMENT OF SHAH JAHAN, BBC Radio, Bruce Young
- 1999, Mrs Davilow, DANIEL DERONDA, BBC Radio Drama, Patrick Rayner
- 1998, Fanny Kemble, RECORD OF A GIRLHOOD, Radio Scotland, David Jackson Young
- 1997, Ellen Richmond, DECEIT, BBC Radio, Hamish Wilson

== Other credits ==
- 2011, Musical, Reciter, FACADE, Auricle Ensemble, Chris Swaffer
- 2010, Television, Mrs McWhisket, A BISCUIT FOR MRS MCWHISKET IN GRANDPA IN MY POCKET SERIES, Adastra, Mellie Bews
- 2010, Audio, Reader, SOMETHING BORROWED BY PAUL MAGRS, AudioGo, Sue Dalziel
- 2009, Audio, Reader, NEVER THE BRIDE BY PAUL MAGRS, BBC Audio Books, Sue Dalziel
- 2008, Rehearsed Reading, Mary Barfoot, AGE OF AROUSAL, Stellar Quines Theatre Company, Linda Griffiths
- 2008, Rehearsed Reading, Margaret Ann Brodie, PROMISES, PROMISES, Random Accomplice, Johnny MacNight
- 2004, Television, Mrs McHarg, MONARCH OF THE GLEN, BBC, Rob Knight
- 2003, Television, chairperson, THE KEY, Key Productions, David Blair
- 2000, Feature Film, Mother, GOLDFISH, A Girl Called Bill, Sam Leyton
- 1999, Corporate, Joyce Allen, OUT OF COURT, Crystal Media, Bernard Krichefski
- 1997, Feature Film, Dr Black, FRIENDLY VOICES, MTP, Jack Wyper
- 1996, Feature Film, Lady Langley, THE RUBY RING, Hallmark/Scottish Television, Harley Cokeliss
- The Omega Factor as Julia Crane (1979)
- Centre Play (Mirror, Mirror) as Emma (1976)
- The Tomorrow People as Mrs. Boswell (1975)
- Z-Cars as Angie Burford (1974)
- Emmerdale Farm as Dr Clare Scott (1973–1977)
- The Shadow of the Tower as Cicely (1972)
- Menace as Clerk (1970)
