= Cyril Luckham =

British actor (1907–1989)

- Born: Cyril Alexander Garland Luckham; 25 July 1907; Salisbury, Wiltshire, England
- Died: 8 February 1989 (aged 81); London, England
- Occupation: Actor
- Years active: 1935–1987
- Spouse: Violet Sylvia Lamb

Cyril Alexander Garland Luckham (25 July 1907 – 8 February 1989) was an English film, television and theatre actor. He was the husband of stage and screen actress Violet Lamb.

== Career ==
The son of a paymaster captain in the Royal Navy, Cyril Luckham was educated at RNC Osborne and Dartmouth and briefly followed his father into the service. He was promoted to Lieutenant in 1930 and retired the following year, transferring to the Emergency List. Afterwards he trained for the stage with the Arthur Brough school at Folkestone, making his debut with Brough's company there in The Admirable Crichton in 1935. For several years he appeared in provincial repertory, notably with the Rapier Players at Bristol's Little Theatre. He had been promoted to Lieutenant-Commander on the retired list in 1938 and was recalled to the Navy when the War broke out. He was invalided out soon afterwards following serious illness and returned to the theatre. Luckham made his West End debut as Torvald Helmer in A Doll's House at the Arts Theatre in July 1945. For several years afterwards his stage work was largely back in the provinces including the touring company of the Old Vic.

Luckham played the White Guardian in the long running science fiction television series Doctor Who. He appeared in The Ribos Operation, the first serial in The Key to Time season, and Enlightenment. In 1965 he played Sir Hugh Archibald-Lake in The Wednesday Play (BBC) Vote, Vote, Vote for Nigel Barton. In the 1967 BBC serialisation of The Forsyte Saga, Luckham played Sir Lawrence Mont, father-in-law of Fleur Forsyte. He appeared in an episode of Randall and Hopkirk (Deceased) (1969); and, as the villain and unscrupulous art dealer in the episode I Always Wanted a Swimming Pool, in the 1971 series of Public Eye. Luckham was a familiar face as a character actor in the 1970s: playing the puppet prime minister in 1971's dystopian TV drama The Guardians, in which the British state becomes one policed by the ubiquitous Guardians; The 7th Duke of Marlborough, in the 1974 Thames mini-series Jennie: Lady Randolph Churchill; Father O'Hara, in Some Mothers Do 'Ave 'Em; the benevolent grandfather, in The Cedar Tree, (a series that ran on ATV from 1975 to 1979); in the 1975 Wodehouse Playhouse episode, 'A Voice from the Past'; as Mr. Luffy, in an episode of the 1978 TV series based on the Famous Five books by Enid Blyton; as the evil psychic, Edward Drexel, in the 1979 supernatural thriller series The Omega Factor; and, as the equitable schoolboard chairman of 'Bamfylde', in the 1980 Andrew Davies (writer)' adaptation of To Serve Them All My Days.

== Partial filmography ==
- Murder in Reverse (1945) - One of Crossley's Guests
- Stranger from Venus (1954) - Dr. Meinard
- Out of the Clouds (1955) - The Doctor
- The Battle of the River Plate (1956) - Lt. Jasper Abbot - HMS Achilles (uncredited)
- The Hostage (1956) - Hugh Ferguson
- Yangtse Incident: The Story of H.M.S. Amethyst (1957) - Commander-in-Chief Far Eastern Station
- How to Murder a Rich Uncle (1957) - Coroner
- The Birthday Present (1957) - Magistrate
- Invasion Quartet (1961) - Col. Harbottle
- Some People (1962) - Magistrate
- Billy Budd (1962) - Alfred Hallam - Captain of Marines
- Espionage (TV series) ('Do You Remember Leo Winters', episode) (1964) - Admiral Bond
- The Pumpkin Eater (1964) - Doctor
- The Great War (BBC TV, 1965)
- The Alphabet Murders (1965) - Sir Carmichael Clarke
- A Man for All Seasons (1966) - Archbishop Cranmer
- The Naked Runner (1967) - Cabinet minister
- Anne of the Thousand Days (1969) - Prior Houghton
- One More Time (1970) - Magistrate
- Mr. Forbush and the Penguins (1971) - Tringham
- The Guardians (1971) - Sir Timothy Hobson
- The Doll - Sir Arnold Wyatt - (Three episodes) (1975)
- The Cedar Tree (1976-1978) - Charles Ashley
- Providence (1977 film) - Doctor Mark Eddington
- Thomas Hardy: A Haunted Man, (BBC TV documentary drama, 1978)
- The Omega Factor (1979) - Drexel
- Strangers and Brothers (1984) – Eustace Pilbrow
