= Marie de Hennezel =

French psychologist, psychotherapist, writer (*1946)

Marie De Hennezel
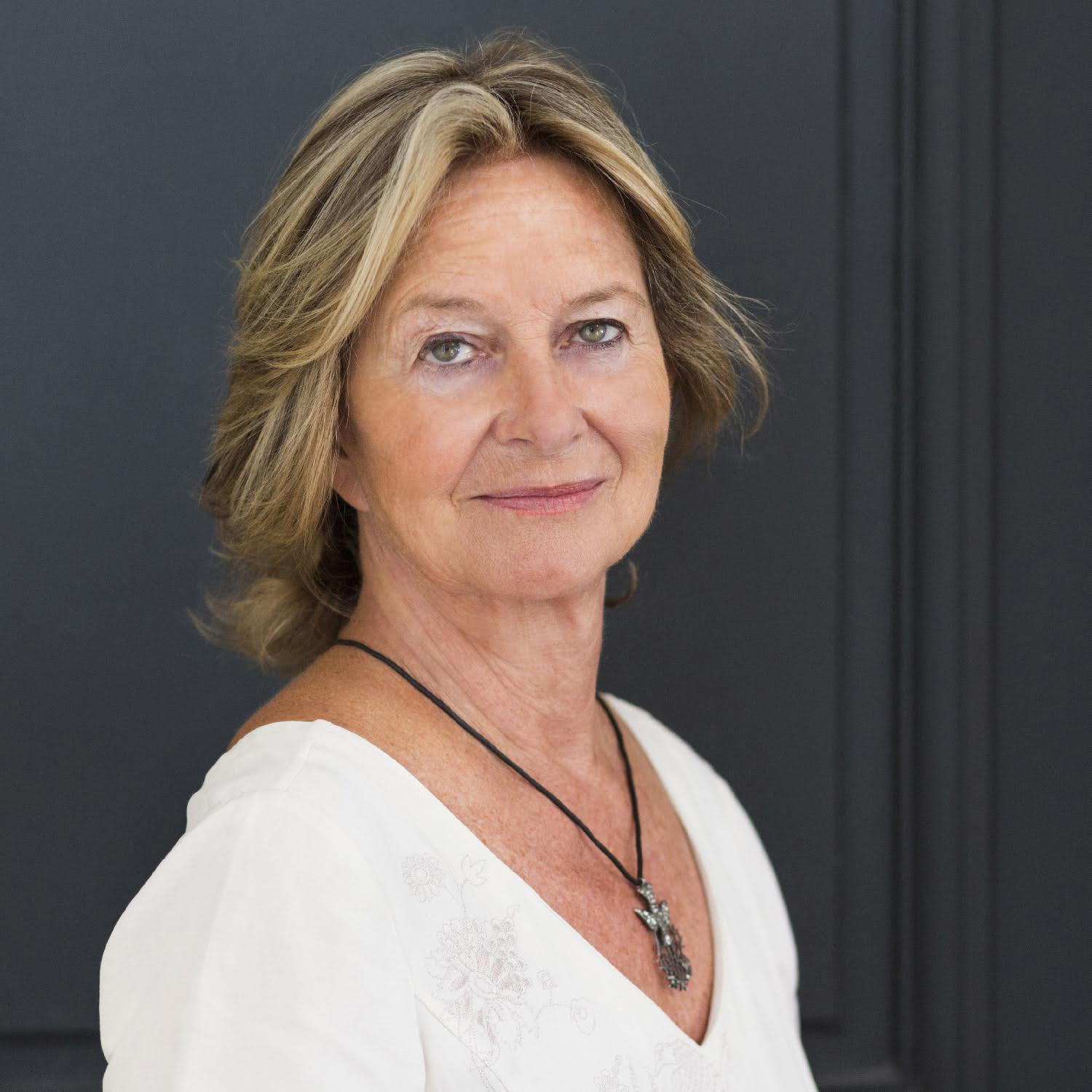
- (2016)
- Born: Marie Gaultier de la Ferrière; 5 August 1946 (age 80); Lyon, France
- Occupations: psychologist; psychotherapist; writer
- Known for: Improving conditions at the end of life

Marie de Hennezel (née , Marie Gaultier de la Ferrière; born August 5, 1946) is a French psychologist, psychotherapist and writer. She is known for her commitment to improving conditions at the end of life. Her books, her two reports to the government, and her speeches on the subject have contributed to the evolution of the image of aging and old age in society.

== Biography ==
Marie Gaultier de la Ferrière was born in Lyon, August 5, 1946. She is an alumna of the educational institution of Maison d'éducation de la Légion d'honneur, is a graduate of the Institute of Intercultural Management and Communication (ISIT) (1966), and holds a Master's degree in English from the Sorbonne Nouvelle University Paris III.

After teaching English, she returned to school to become a clinical psychologist. She obtained a Diploma of Higher Specialized Studies (DESS) in clinical psychology at Paris-Sorbonne University and then a Master of Advanced Studies in psychoanalysis at Paris Diderot University in 1975. From 1975 to 1984, she worked as a clinical psychologist in several social welfare offices and at the Family Planning, at the time of the Veil Act. Then from 1984 to 1986, she worked as a clinical psychologist in a psychiatric department at the Villejuif Regional Hospital.

Through her brother Jacques de la Ferrière, then chief of protocol at the Élysée Palace, she met President François Mitterrand in November 1984. This was followed by meetings with Mitterrand during the last twelve years of his life until January 1996. On the 20th anniversary of his death, Hennezel published her book, Croire aux forces de l’esprit (Believing in the Forces of the Spirit), which outlines his little-known inner personality.

In 1987, she joined the first palliative care unit created in France, at the International Hospital of the University of Paris, by Mitterrand. From 1992, she divided her time between this unit and an HIV/AIDS care unit at the Hôpital Notre-Dame-du-Bon-Secours. She recounts this experience with people at the end of their lives in a book with a preface by Mitterrand, La mort intime, published by Robert Laffont (1995) and translated into some twenty languages.

Her work with various associations (Note: From 1984, she participated in a prayer group of the Invitation to Life movement, without being part of the organization, and left this prayer group in 1987. Marie de Hennezel is sometimes confused with Marie d'Hennezel, a shareholder of Sevene Pharma and a member of the Invitation to Life movement. This confusion is said to have led in 1996 to an article published in the weekly magazine L'Express, which Marie de Hennezel judged to be defamatory and to which she replied. This homonymy was also noted in an article in Le Figaro.) and her commitment to accompanying people with HIV at the end of life (Note: In 1992, with Jean-Louis Terrangle, she founded the Association Bernard Dutant - Sida et Ressourcement to help HIV-positive people. Based in Marseille, she remained honorary president until its closure in 2018.) led her to complete her training in Jungian psychoanalysis with training in hapno-psychotherapy at the Centre international de recherche et de développement de l'haptonomie (CIRDH) in 1992.

From 1996 to 2002, she attended conference where she passed on the experience of accompaniment acquired with people at the end of life, and training courses for health professionals.

In 2002, Jean-François Mattei, Minister of Health, the Family and the Handicapped, entrusted Hennezel to research and report on the end of life. This report Fin de vie, le devoir d’accompagnement (End of life, the duty to accompany) (October 2003) inspired the parliamentary mission on the accompaniment of the end of life, and the law of April 22, 2005, Droits des malades et fin de vie (Rights of the sick and the end of life) is an extension of it.

In January 2005, Hennezel was entrusted by Philippe Douste-Blazy, Minister of Health, to disseminate information about palliative culture. In February 2010, she was appointed a member of the steering committee of the Observatoire national de la fin de vie (National Observatory on the End of Life). She resigned from this committee in 2012, following a disagreement concerning the methodology of the observatory.

Hennezel runs seminars on "the art of aging well" for [udiens, the mutual insurance company and pension fund for the entertainment, audio-visual and press professions. She is a member of the honorary committee of the collective Plus digne la vie, and is also a director and member of the scientific committee of the Korian Foundation.

== Awards and honours ==
- Knight, Legion of Honour, 1998.
- Officer, Ordre national du Mérite, 2003
- Doctor honoris causa, Université de Namur, 2007

== Selected works ==
- L'Amour ultime : l'accompagnement des mourants, 1991
- La mort intime : ceux qui vont mourir nous apprennent à vivre, 1995
- L'art de mourir : traditions religieuses et spiritualité humaniste face à la mort aujourd'hui, 1997
- Nous ne nous sommes pas dit au revoir : la dimension humaine du débat sur l'euthanasie, 2000
- Le souci de l'autre, 2004
- Fin de vie le devoir d'accompagnement : rapport au ministre de la Santé, octobre 2003, 2004
- Propositions pour une vie digne jusqu'au bout, 2004
- Mourir les yeux ouverts, 2005
- The art of growing old : aging with grace, 2007
- Une vie pour se mettre au monde, 2010
- Qu'allons nous faire de vous?, 2011
- Seize the day : how the dying teach us to live, 2012
- Nous voulons tous mourir dans la dignité, 2013
- A Frenchwoman's guide to sex after sixty, 2017
