= John Carlisle (actor) =

English actor (1935–2011)

- Born: John Roxburgh Clark; 6 September 1935; London, England, United Kingdom
- Died: 7 December 2011 (aged 76); London, England, United Kingdom
- Occupation: Actor

John Carlisle (6 September 1935 – 7 December 2011) was an English television and stage actor.

== Early life ==
Carlisle was born in London and named John Roxburgh Clark. He decided in his early teens that he wanted to become an actor. He started acting in amateur productions until he was called up for National Service. Upon his release he worked odd jobs, determined to finance an acting course at RADA. Eventually he found himself with enough money, only to discover all his hard work had been unnecessary, for he had been entitled to a council grant all along.

On completion of his training at RADA, Carlisle joined Harrogate Repertory and subsequently appeared in repertory all over the country, including at Ipswich, Birmingham and Liverpool.

== Television and film ==
While appearing in repertory at Birmingham, Carlisle was spotted by an ATV casting director and asked to audition for the hospital drama series Emergency Ward 10. Carlisle first assumed the role of the young doctor Lester Large in episode 533, in 1962. His character became a regular in the show, and Carlisle made numerous appearances including in the final episode of the long-running series in 1967.

He starred alongside John Woodvine in the London Weekend Television crime series New Scotland Yard from 1972 to 1973. He played the opinionated and sometimes callous Detective Inspector (later Sergeant) Alan Ward and referred to having played the role "in kind of a Gestapo way, beating up criminals and things like that". The portrayal led to letters of complaint, so that the character was toned down in subsequent series. In 1979, Carlisle appeared in the BBC series The Omega Factor as the morally ambiguous psychiatrist Dr. Roy Martindale. In 2002 he portrayed the important supporting role of James Forsyte, father of Soames Forsyte, in The Forsyte Saga.

He also made one-off appearances in series such as The Avengers, Z-Cars, Strange Report, Dixon of Dock Green, Lovejoy, The Black Adder, Hustle, Holby City, Robin Hood, The Catherine Tate Show, Midsomer Murders, Between the Lines, The Inspector Alleyn Mysteries, The Rivals of Sherlock Holmes and Doctors.

On film, Carlisle played the elderly Private Mirus in the 2001 horror film The Bunker. He also had small roles in Richard E. Grant's Wah-Wah (2005) and in Forget Me Not (2010).

Carlisle died in London, England, UK on 7 December 2011, aged 76.

== Later work in theatre ==
Carlisle joined the Royal Shakespeare Company (RSC) in 1979, rather unusually for an actor who until then had predominantly worked in television. He then performed extensively on stage (see 'Selected stage work'). He appeared on Broadway in the RSC productions Cyrano de Bergerac, Much Ado About Nothing (both 1985) and The Life and Adventures of Nicholas Nickleby (1986) as well as A Doll's House (1997). As an Associate Artist with the RSC he appeared in a great number of plays, including The Taming of the Shrew, Love's Labour's Lost, A Midsummer Night's Dream, The Seagull and Per Gynt. In later years he worked prominently at the National Theatre.

== Selected stage work ==
- 1970 – The Boys in the Band (as director and actor)
- 1978 – Every Good Boy Deserves Favour
- 1980 – Timon of Athens
- 1980/1981 – Richard III
- 1981 – The Maid's Tragedy
- 1981 – The Fool
- 1981 – Troilus and Cressida
- 1982 – The Taming of the Shrew
- 1982–85 – Much Ado About Nothing
- 1983 – Molière
- 1984 – Softcops
- 1984 – Cyrano de Bergerac
- 1984 – Love's Labour's Lost
- 1984–1985 – Henry V
- 1984–1986 – Richard III
- 1986 – The Life and Adventures of Nicholas Nickleby
- 1987 – Hyde Park
- 1987 – The New Inn
- 1987/1988 – The Jew of Malta
- 1987/1988 – The Merchant of Venice
- 1987–1988 – Twelfth Night
- 1988 – A Question of Geography
- 1989 – A Midsummer Night's Dream
- 1989 – Cymbeline
- 1990 – Two Shakespeare Actors
- 1990 – The Seagull
- 1990/1991 – Much Ado About Nothing
- 1991/1992 – A Woman of No Importance
- 1993 – Elgar's Rondo
- 1994 – Ghosts
- 1994/1995 – Alice's Adventures Underground
- 1995 – Cain
- 1996 – The Painter of Dishonour
- 1997 – A Doll's House
- 1997/1998 – The Invention of Love
- 1999 – King Lear
- 2000 – Semi Monde
- 2002 – The Coast of Utopia
- 2003/04 – His Dark Materials
- 2005 – Henry IV, Parts 1 & 2
- 2005 – As You Desire Me

== Audio work ==
- 1994 – 20,000 Leagues Under the Sea (abridged, Naxos AudioBooks)
- 1994 – Fast Coach To Gneixendorf (BBC)
- 1995 – A Midsummer Night's Dream (BBC)
- 1996 – Framely Parsonage (BBC)
- 1997 – A House By The Sea (BBC)
- 1998 – The Birds Fall Down (BBC Radio 4)
- 1999 – The Invention of Love (BBC Radio 3)
- 2001 – King Lear (BBC R3)
- 2002 – His Dark Materials: The Subtle Knife (BBC R4)
- 2002 – Wife To Mr. Milton (BBC R4)
- 2003 – Our Kath (BBC R4)
- 2003 – Strangers and Brothers (BBC R4)
- 2004 – Miracle Postponed (BBC R4)
- 2005 – Fragments (BBC R4)
- 2006 – Street And Lane (BBC R4)
- 2007 – Felix Holt, The Radical (BBC)
- ??? – Byron (ballet by Paul Reid) (BBC)
