= The Pat Hobby Stories =

Posthumous short story collection by F. Scott Fitzgerald

- First edition cover
- Author: F. Scott Fitzgerald
- Language: English
- Genre: Short stories
- Publisher: Charles Scribner's Sons
- Publication date: 1962
- Publication place: United States
- ISBN: 978-0684804422

The Pat Hobby Stories is a collection of short stories by American writer F. Scott Fitzgerald. The 17 stories were originally published by Arnold Gingrich of Esquire magazine between January 1940 and May 1941, and later collected in one volume in 1962. The last five installments of The Pat Hobby Stories were published in Esquire after Fitzgerald's death in December 1940.

Pat Hobby, the protagonist in the stories, is a down-and-out screenwriter in Hollywood, once successful as "a good man for structure" during the silent age of cinema, but now reduced to an alcoholic hack hanging around the studio lot. Most stories find him broke and engaged in some ploy for money or a much-desired screen credit, but his antics usually backfire and end in further humiliation. Drawing on his own experiences as a writer in Hollywood, Fitzgerald portrays Pat Hobby with self-deprecating humor and nostalgia.

In an introduction to The Pat Hobby Stories, editor Arnold Gingrich notes how "while it would be unfair to judge this book as a novel, it would be less than fair to consider it as anything but a full-length portrait. It was as such that Fitzgerald worked on it, and would have wanted it presented in book form, after its original magazine publication. He thought of it as a comedy."

== List of stories ==
The Pat Hobby Stories
Order	Title	Esquire issue	Author
1	Pat Hobby's Christmas Wish	January, 1940	F. Scott Fitzgerald
Forced into working over the Christmas holiday to meet a deadline, Hobby and his new secretary devise a scheme to blackmail studio executive Harry Gooddorf. Hobby entertains fantasies of recapturing his status and wealth once Gooddorf makes him a producer, but their incriminating evidence (a memo that seems to implicate Gooddorf in the unsolved murder of the director William Desmond Taylor) turns out to be nothing more than a slightly cryptic expression of grief. Wise to the plot, Gooddorf grants Hobby his new Christmas wish: that he ignore the accusation and leave Hobby on the payroll as a lowly writer.
2	A Man in the Way	February, 1940	F. Scott Fitzgerald
Short on ideas, Hobby wanders into what he thinks is an unoccupied office only to meet Priscilla Smith, a young writer who shares with him a story she is considering about an artist in wartime Europe who is turned down for the job of removing his own paintings from a museum for safekeeping. Hobby dismisses the idea, but when his own stories fail to excite the executives during a pitch meeting, he regains their favor by claiming the artist story as his own. Elated, Hobby calls Priscilla for a date but is turned down. Hanging up the phone, she turns her attention to Jack Berners (the executive who bought Hobby's stolen story, and her ostensible lover) and begins to tell him about the original story she is developing...
3	'Boil Some Water - Lots of It'	March, 1940	F. Scott Fitzgerald
While lunching at the commissary, Hobby witnesses an extra from a film shoot attempting to sit at a table reserved for executives (a table where Hobby himself has often wished to sit). As the bad-mannered actor continues to criticize the executives and insist on being seated, Hobby decides to take action and attacks him with a serving tray. Momentarily proud of his assertiveness, Hobby is informed that the man whose face he has bloodied is actually a well-respected writer, disguised as an extra to play a practical joke on the executives.
4	Teamed with Genius	April, 1940	F. Scott Fitzgerald
Assigned to work on a screenplay with eccentric English playwright René Wilcox, Hobby encounters frustration as his new partner refuses to cooperate on the project. In desperation, Hobby steals what he thinks is Wilcox's own version of the screenplay and hurriedly alters it to look like a joint effort. The script is submitted to executives who recognize it as a long-ago rejected version. Wilcox's real script is applauded, and instead of firing Hobby he requests that he be assigned to him once again, this time so that Wilcox can study him for a future screenplay about a pathetic man.
5	Pat Hobby and Orson Welles	May, 1940	F. Scott Fitzgerald
Hollywood is abuzz about the arrival of Orson Welles. Meanwhile, tightened security prevents Hobby from entering the studio. His frustration takes the form of a hatred of Welles, about whom Hobby knows very little aside from the fact that he has a beard, and is making a great deal of money. Hobby encounters an executive, Harold Marcus, leaving the studio and asks for a ride in his limousine, during which Hobby coaxes Marcus to issue him a studio pass and downplays the Welles phenomenon, suggesting that Welles will be expensive to work with. Later, while looking to borrow money from the studio wigmaker, Hobby is reluctantly fitted with a false beard to play up his resemblance to Welles and driven around the studio where he endures the stares of the crowds he passes. When his identity is mistaken by Harold Marcus, who remembers Hobby's earlier warning about Welles, Marcus has a heart attack and this time Hobby is the one asked to take on a passenger, to drive Marcus to the infirmary. Hobby rushes out of the car and off the studio lot to a local bar where he uses the money borrowed from the wigmaker to buy drinks for a group of bearded extras.
6	Pat Hobby's Secret	June, 1940	F. Scott Fitzgerald
Hobby is employed by a studio executive, Mr. Banizon, to track down a writer and recover an important story detail that Banizon has forgotten so that the screenplay being written can proceed without needing to put the writer back on salary. Hobby finds the writer in a bar and, after a night of heavy drinking, gets the information he wants. The writer realizes that he's been tricked and a fight breaks out, during which the bouncer at the bar accidentally kills the writer. Hobby is forced to testify as a witness, but cowardly claims to remember nothing about the fight. Meeting with Bainzon to reveal the story secret (and negotiate a price for his recovery of it), Hobby realizes that this too has slipped his mind.
7	Pat Hobby, Putative Father	July, 1940	F. Scott Fitzgerald
Hobby is asked to give a tour of the studio to some special guests. He is introduced to an Indian nobleman and his adopted son, who claims that Hobby may be his biological father. Confused, Hobby leads the pair on a lackluster tour during which they walk onto a working set, thus spoiling the filming in progress. The pair leave Hollywood, but only after thanking Hobby for the tour and offering him a cash allowance that will be paid monthly, the only exception being in the case of a war involving England, which would complicate Indian finances. Hobby gets drunk to celebrate his good fortune, but wakes up the next day to read a declaration of war in the newspaper.
8	The Homes of the Stars	August, 1940	F. Scott Fitzgerald
While tending to his broken-down car, Hobby is mistaken by a wealthy tourist couple for a guide to the homes of movie stars. Hobby takes their money and attempts to visit the homes of some minor celebrities he is acquainted with, but the couple demand to be taken to the home of Shirley Temple. Hobby leads them to an empty house which he claims is Temple's, but as the couple explore the house, Hobby observes his producer, Mr. Marcus (the home's actual owner) arriving. Unable to improvise an excuse, Hobby flees, leaving the couple behind.
9	Pat Hobby Does His Bit	September, 1940	F. Scott Fitzgerald
While attempting to borrow money from an actor, Hobby accidentally walks in front of the rolling camera and spoils a shot. The leading actress, finished with her final scene for the picture, dashes off to catch a plane to New York and go home to England. The next day, Hobby is confronted by Mr. Berners who scolds him for the trouble he caused but then informs him that he will be forced to act in the film to explain his appearance in yesterday's shot. On his first day of shooting, Hobby is outfitted with protective armor so that he can be run over by a car. Just before the fateful moment, Hobby loses consciousness and wakes up later that night, alone and still encased in the metal suit. He is informed by a guard that he must have been forgotten in the chaos after the actor driving the car caused an accident and broke his leg. Hobby reflects with pride on the way he fulfilled his role, even unwittingly.
10	Pat Hobby's Preview	October, 1940	F. Scott Fitzgerald
After learning that he might be stripped of his screen credit, Hobby plans to attend the premiere of a film which he co-authored. He meets a beautiful young woman on the studio lot and invites her to attend with him. When he attempts to claim his tickets, Hobby is informed that the premiere is sold out, but is given the tickets left behind by his co-author, Wainwright, who has refused to attend for unknown reasons. When Hobby arrives at the theater with his date, he is refused admittance; the tickets he presents at the door are actually for a burlesque show. Adding insult to injury, Hobby is told that the film is a disaster, and he will be allowed to retain his screen credit after all.
11	No Harm Trying	November, 1940	F. Scott Fitzgerald
Hobby encounters a series of people at the studio, including a beautiful young actress, a non-working director, an unstable executive, and a callboy with fresh story ideas. In need of an assignment, he puts together a team and tries to sell their idea for a film. After collaborating with Hobby's ex-wife on a script, the team pitches their idea to Mr. LeVigne, who rejects them outright, pointing out their crippling inadequacies, including the actress's inability to speak English. The callboy is offered a job writing, and Hobby is given another month of work, though still without an assignment.
12	A Patriotic Short	December, 1940	F. Scott Fitzgerald
Hobby works on a short script about an American military figure, General Fitzhugh Lee. Between bouts of writer's block, he daydreams about his glory days as a well-paid writer. Hobby's memories become more and more fantastic, as he recalls a visit to the studio by the President of the United States, who later visited Hobby's neighborhood and complimented his swimming pool. Filled with self-loathing at what he has become, after being snubbed by an acquaintance in the hallway Hobby turns his frustration into dialogue for his script.
13	On the Trail of Pat Hobby	January, 1941	F. Scott Fitzgerald
Out of habit, Hobby wanders around the studio despite not having a job there. He steals the hat of Mr. Marcus from the commissary check room, since he hasn't enough money to buy one of his own. When he is asked to help think of a title for a film set in a tourist motel, Hobby fears that his own secret job as a night clerk at just such a motel has been discovered. Finally, Hobby drinks the brandy that he finds in an unoccupied office and in his drunken state accidentally supplies a title for the story.
14	Fun in an Artist's Studio	February, 1941	F. Scott Fitzgerald
While visiting the studio, a European Princess takes an interest in Hobby and asks that he be loaned to her to pose for a painting. Hobby interprets the request as a sign of romantic interest, but is disappointed when he finds out that the Princess is only interested in making art. His disappointment supplies the perfect mood that the Princess was so drawn to.
15	Two Old-Timers	March, 1941	F. Scott Fitzgerald
Hobby and Phil Macedon, an aging actor, are taken into custody by the police after having a drunken argument on the street. As they wait to be charged, Hobby explains to Sergeant Gaspar that the argument stemmed from Macedon refusing to believe that he and Hobby were acquainted from having worked together in the old days. Gaspar professes to be a fan of Macedon's films, but when Hobby tells a story that embarrasses Macedon it shatters the policeman's illusions about the movies. Hobby is eventually released.
16	Mightier Than the Sword	April, 1941	F. Scott Fitzgerald
While having his shoes shined, Hobby meets a director who is in the middle of an argument with a young writer. The writer is dismissed, and Hobby is hired as his replacement. While the young writer returns to the East to write a book, Hobby and the director work together for a month, completing the script. Another argument with the original writer causes the director to fire Hobby in his rage. Later, Hobby and the writer cross paths and remark on the hard life forced on writers at the studio.
17	Pat Hobby's College Days	May, 1941	F. Scott Fitzgerald
Hobby's secretary drives around Los Angeles, failing to find a place to dispose of some unknown objects. She calls Hobby to complain about the task, but he cuts her off as he is about to visit a college campus where he hopes to create a stir about the possibility of writing a college-themed film, and perhaps to borrow some money while he's at it. During his meeting with the faculty, Hobby's secretary is brought in by a guard who caught her on the campus with a large sack of emptied liquor bottles; remnants from Hobby's most recent studio assignment. His image compromised, Hobby leaves before his idea for a film can be rejected.

== Uncollected story ==
Fitzgerald wrote additional Pat Hobby stories, beyond those published in Esquire. These primarily consist of incomplete drafts and notes for stories, but one additional complete story was found in the Fitzgerald Papers at Princeton University by Fitzgerald scholar Anne Margaret Daniel in 2018. This typescript was untitled and undated, but it presumably was written in the summer of 1940; it was published in 2025 in The New Yorker with the title "Double Time For Pat Hobby".

== Screen adaptation ==
A television adaptation of The Pat Hobby Stories was made in 1987, titled Tales from the Hollywood Hills: Pat Hobby Teamed with Genius, starring Christopher Lloyd as Pat Hobby and directed by Robert C. Thompson. The cast also included Colin Firth as Rene Wilcox, Joseph Campanella as Jack Berners, and Dennis Franz as Louie.

== Reviews ==
- Andrew Turnbull (July 22, 1962). "The Last Buffoon". The New York Times.
- "Wire the Money". Time. August 3, 1962. Archived from the original on February 19, 2011.
