= Phoenixes Flying Together =

Late 19th-century poem by Cheng Huiying

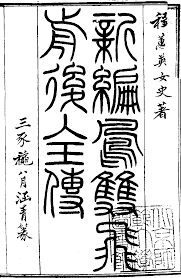
- Author: Cheng Huiying
- Language: Classical Chinese
- Genre: Tanci
- Published: 1897–1903 (newspaper serial) 1898 (42-chapter book) 1899 (52–chapter book)
- Publisher: Shanghai Shuju (1899 edition)

Chinese name
- Traditional Chinese: 鳳雙飛
- Simplified Chinese: 凤双飞
Transcriptions
Standard Mandarin
- Hanyu Pinyin: Fèng Shuāngfēi
- Wade–Giles: feng^{4} shuang^{1}fei^{1}

Phoenixes Flying Together (traditional Chinese: 鳳雙飛; simplified Chinese: 凤双飞; pinyin: Fèng Shuāngfēi) (Note: Other translations include A Pair of Phoenixes Takes Off (Yeh 2006, p. 208), Paired Flying Phoenixes (Wang 2012, p. 159), and A Pair of Male Phoenixes Flying Together (Liu 2016, p. 57) .) is a 19th-century tanci (narrative poem) by Cheng Huiying (程蕙英). Published in 42- and 52-chapter editions, the story follows two celestial beings who descend to the mortal realm during the Ming dynasty. Born to families in the same village, sworn brothers Guo Lingyun and Zhang Yishao find positions within the imperial government. Together, they are able to quash a rebellion in Tufan and in the East China Sea, the latter with the help of Zhang's sister Feixiang. Due to machinations by the eunuch Liu Jin, Lingyun is nearly executed for treason, though a sacrifice by Yishao is able to save him.

Published in various forms at the end of the 19th-century, including as a serial in the newspaper Youxi Bao from 1897 to 1903 and as standalone editions in 1898 and 1899, Phoenixes Flying Together was well received by contemporary reviewers. Though sharing some similarities with other tanci written by women authors, it differs in its use of multiple focal characters as well as its attribution to a serious literata. The work has been analysed in terms of its representation of same-sex relationships, both male and female, as well as its exploration of gender normativity and Confucian values.

== Plot ==
In the Ming dynasty, the immortals Wang Zijin and Wuyou Xian descend to the mortal realm. These sworn brothers are born as Guo Lingyun and Zhang Yishao, respectively. As their families are friendly, the boys are raised together. After the death of his parents, Lingyun is taken by the Emperor as a study companion for the crown prince. Yishao, meanwhile, studies martial arts before arriving at the capital and befriending another of the emperor's sons.

While Yishao's father is travelling in Yunnan, he is captured by the Tufans. An expedition led by Yishao and General Mu is unsuccessful, being foiled by a monk wielding black magic. Lingyun, who has been banished to Guizhou based on the slander of the eunuch Liu Jin, is summoned to use his heavenly magic. Their combined forces are successful, and the men return to the capital. In their absence, Liu Jin has seized control of the government, ruling through a manipulated emperor. Lingyun departs for Shandong; during his searches for his fiancée—Yishao's sister Zhang Feixiang—he meets Zhen Daya, whom he takes as a concubine. Yishao, meanwhile, remains in the capital, taking General Mu's daughter Qionghua as his wife while also beginning romances with Bao Xiang'er and Zhen Xiaoya.

Five years later, Zhang Feixiang and her travelling companion He Danyan are discovered on Three Immortal Island, where Feixiang has passed as a man and taken King Murong Tao's daughter Zhu as her wife. Feixiang initiates discussions to have the island become a vassal state of the Ming dynasty, but negotiations are sabotaged by Liu Jin, who arranges for the murder of King Tao. An angered Princess Zhu allies with the dragon spirit who rules a nearby island and wars against the Ming. Though Zhu ultimately relents due to her feelings for Feixiang, Lingyun and his allies must defeat the dragon spirit and her allies to pacify the region.

Returning to the capital, Lingyun declares victory. However, Lin Jun convinces the emperor that Lingyun is a traitor and that he should be put to death. Yishao, who remains trusted by the court, enters the chamber and argues Lingyun's innocence; when words are ineffectual, he stabs his own heart, only being revived by Lingyun's tears. The two convince the emperor of Liu Jin's treachery, and the eunuch is executed. Meanwhile, Princess Zhu and He Danyan hunt down Liu Jin's surviving allies, gaining recognition from the throne.

Many years later, Lingyun and Yishao have had numerous children with their wives and concubines. They ascend back to the heavens. (Note: This summary is based on the synopsis presented by Liu (2010, pp. 20–24).)

== Author ==
Phoenixes Flying Together was written by Cheng Huiying (程蕙英) (fl. 1859–1899), also known by the art name Chenchou (茞俦; 茞儔), the daughter of a wealthy gentry family. Little is recorded of her life, though she is thought to have supported herself as a teacher. The consistent attribution of the text to Cheng, according to the sinologist Liu Wenjia, is unusual. Most texts deemed literary, as well as those with historical allusions, were generally identified as being written by men. Furthermore, few contemporaneous women writers were able to explicitly discuss sexuality while still remaining respectable.

Cheng was reported to have been born in Wujin, Changzhou, Jiangsu. This region had been a centre of literary production under the Qianlong and Jiaqing emperors, and had a tradition of educating women within the family. As such, Liu concludes that Cheng would have been exposed to literature that shaped her tastes and skills. One foreword described her as having read the works of Ban Gu and Fan Ye, and she directly referenced such works as Wang Shifu's Romance of the Western Chamber and Tang Xianzu's The Peony Pavilion. Aside from Phoenixes Flying Together, which was completed in three versions over twenty-five years, she wrote a poetry collection, Draft Chantings from the North Window (北窗吟稿), though no copies are known to have survived. Another of Cheng's poems has survived, having been quoted by several writers discussing her writing.

== Analysis ==
=== Tanci ===
Phoenixes Flying Together is classified as a tanci, a type of narrative poem that has a lengthy history in China. Although such popular fiction was traditionally presented orally, beginning in the mid-Ming dynasty written compositions emerged. Written tanci by women authors such as Cheng covered a range of subjects, including cross-dressing, mock marriage, and martial chivalry. Several thematic elements in Phoenixes Flying Together resemble those of other woman-authored works, including the depiction of its main protagonists as immortal beings descended to the mortal realm, as well as their return to the celestial realm at the end of their lives. Its presentation also resembles other tanci by women authors, being described as coming from a fictional author and a work of "lighthearted fun constructed into allegory".

Phoenixes Flying Together differs from other woman-authored tanci in several aspects. It is noted as using varied focal characters, rather than a singular woman narrator. Likewise, while Cheng dedicated her work to "friends who understand her" as with other tanci written by women, she is read by Liu as showing an unusual level of pride in her work, not caring if its read by "mundane people". Cheng's fictional narrator similarly differs from others in the genre, being presented not as a "modest and meek woman" who cares only for women readers, but a "mad" and sorrowful literata, little different than Sima Qian, who demands that her work be given proper recognition.

=== Homoeroticism and gender fluidity ===
Homoeroticism and challenges to heteronormative discourse have been identified in Phoenixes Flying Together. Guo Li describes Phoenixes Flying Together in the journal Prism as "a vital example of early modern queer literary tradition", while Zhang Wanrong in Religions deems it "the only known complete novel about male homosexuality written by a woman in ancient China". The story includes both male–male and female–female pairings. Same-sex relationships are depicted not merely in terms of physical desire, but allowing "compassion and sentimental attachment", and are "as emotionally satisfying and desirable for women as for men".

Male–male homoerotic relationships were commonly depicted in Chinese literature during the Ming and Qing dynasties. In the context of Phoenixes Flying Together, Guo writes that such relationships remained prominent due to the story's "extensive description of male homoeroticism". Zhang Wanrong describes these homosexual themes as evident even in the title, which uses the character 鳳 (fèng), referring exclusively to male phoenixes; the equivalent for a female phoenix would be 凰 (huáng). In the context of intercourse between men, the act of penetration is described as only permitted when the receiving partner is under the age of twenty; this is justified in the narrative according to contemporary Taoist mores and sexual practices, whereby younger boys remained dominated by yin energy whereas the yang energy that ruled older men would come into conflict.

Guo highlights several interactions between Lingyun and Yishao as heavily emphasizing their homoerotic relationship. In one scene, the two quarrel over the possibility that Yishao may become the sexual partner of the emperor's heir, and Lingyun threatens to leave him for another man. In another incident, Yishao tears his chest open while pleading for Lingyun's life, only to be brought back to life by Lingyun's tears. The two also receive advances from other men, with the government official Zhang Cai lusting for Yishao, and Lingyun admiring the beauty of Bai Ruyu. Guo likewise highlights Bai, who is narrated as a dangerously beautiful man. Guo describes the character as drawing from the femme fatale archetype, with his relationships with male patrons "depicted as mirror images of heteroerotic love". This beauty is weaponized against General Wei Yong and his sons, all of whom Bai seduces before urging the youngest son to kill his father and his elder. Bai's beauty is only effective on men, as his attempts to woo a female bandit are ineffectual.

Phoenixes Flying Together also contains homoerotic interactions between women, something uncommon in contemporary Chinese literature. Guo notes attraction between Zhang Feixiang and her friend and travelling companion He Danyan, as well as Feixiang's relationship with Princess Zhu. While passing as a man, Feixiang enters a marriage with Princess Zhu, whom she unabashedly stares at and deems extraordinarily beautiful during their first meeting. This marriage, forced by Zhu's father after the two meet in secret and violate social norms, is maintained for five years after the wedding. Even as Feixiang regrets that she cannot enjoy Zhu's body as a man would, the two exchange poetry and treat their relationship as fated. Zhu is jealous of Feixiang's relationship with Lingyun, and after their marriage, Feixiang uses their relationship as leverage to convince Zhu to become Lingyun's concubine. (Note: Instances of cross-dressing women convincing their wives to become their husbands' concubines are also found in Chen Duansheng and Liang Desheng's The Destiny of Rebirth and Qiu Xinru's Flowers Growing from Writing Brushes (Liu 2014, paragraph 10). In such works of fiction, this enabled writers to allow these women to retain their social status without having to bear the dishonour of a second marriage (Liu 2014, paragraph 15).) Feixiang retains a desire for Zhu even after marrying Lingyun, and Liu writes that concubinage allows the two women to ensure their togetherness forever.

Cross-dressing is practised by both Feixiang and He Danyan. Feixiang in particular is narrated as equally capable of presenting herself as a man or woman of culture, able to "[eradicate] the gentle and charming appearance of a woman and [take] the elegant demeanor of a scholar". This physical fluidity is combined with skill in poetry, painting, and calligraphy, as well as military strategy and governance, all of which Feixiang undertakes while presenting a male persona. In her gender disguise, Feixiang neglects some of the decorum expected of men of culture, staring at Princess Zhu with frank interest and eating a meal with her without Zhu's father present.

=== Confucian ideology ===
Examining Phoenixes Flying Together within the context of Confucian teachings in The Journal of Chinese Literature and Culture, Liu Wenjia describes Lingyun's wife Zhang Feixiang as embodying the archetype of the virtuous woman, that is, one who adheres to Confucian rules regarding such issues as loyalty, chastity, and filial piety. However, unlike in male authors' depictions of such women, Feixiang shows literary talent and passion while also conducting herself with agency and power, both elements associated with manhood in the patriarchal Confucian structure. Feixiang continues her literary activities even as she maintains her household, and her spouse Lingyun treats her as an intellectual equal.

Other women, Liu writes, are depicted as going against Confucian teachings. Mu Qionghua, the wife of Yishao, opposes his taking of a concubine and is described even by her own family as jealous. She is presented as fighting those who, according to the Confucian order, are her social superiors, including her parents-in-law, teachers, and her elder brother. Princess Zhu is similarly depicted as jealous, though she acknowledges her lack of ren (generosity). Coming from an outer island, and thus considered a barbarian unversed in Confucianism, she is frequently described as angry and even cruel. However, unlike in male-written stories, these social transgressions are given justifications based in Confucian teachings; jealousy is ascribed to a passionate response to male wrongs, as well as efforts to maintain the social order. For example, Zhang Yishao is presented as requiring a strict wife to curb his unrestrained sexual appetites.

== Release and reception ==
Phoenixes Flying Together was originally distributed and circulated in manuscript form, with the writer Xu Ke describing it as popular with educated women. The tanci was serialized in the newspaper Youxi Bao between November 1897 and March 1903, with one illustrated page included in each day's edition. These instalments were provided loose, and in his preface to the serial, Li Boyuan wrote that he had discovered Cheng and aided publication of her manuscript.

Several collated editions were also issued. In 1898, Phoenixes Flying Together was published in a 42-chapter edition. A 52-chapter edition followed in 1899, by Shanghai Shuju (上海書局). The publisher of the earlier edition appears to have been aware of the later edition, writing in commentary that the longer edition was "a crude version augmented by some busybody". A third version, made using movable type, was issued by Guangyi Publishing House. A lithograph edition was published by Jiangzuo Shulin in 1923. The Shanghai Shuju edition was republished in Zhongzhou in 1988. Another reprinting was issued in 1996 by the Beijing-based Renmin Wenxue Chubanshe. The full book has 1.8 million words.

Phoenixes Flying Together was popular with readers after publication, and contemporary reviews were positive. Xu described the story as so popular that it drove up the price of paper, using an exaggeration common at the time. Deng Zhicheng compared the work positively to Tao Zhenhuai's A Rain of Flowers and Chen Duansheng's Flowers through Time, deeming it better in terms of structure and diction.

== Works cited ==
- Ding Jie (丁潔) (March 2011). 毗陵多閨秀：清代常州才媛 [Known for Its Many Talented Young Women: Changzhou's Most Outstanding Women during the Qing Dynasty] (PDF). Contemporary Historiography. 11 (1): 26–29. Archived from the original (PDF) on 24 April 2026.
- Epstein, Maram (2024). "From Sentiment to Domestic Order: Women Rewriting Dream of the Red Chamber". In Luo, Manling (ed.). Cross-Generic Perspectives on Traditional Chinese Literature. Sinica Leidensia. Vol. 168. Leiden: Brill. pp. 198–229. doi:10.1163/9789004714069_010. ISBN 978-90-04-71406-9.
- Guo, Li (2021). "Hybrid Subjects, Fluid Bonds: Envisioning the Early Modern Queer in Phoenixes Flying Together". Prism. 18 (1): 27–48. doi:10.1215/25783491-8922185.
- Liu, Wenjia (September 2010). The Tanci Feng Shuangfei: A Female Perspective on the Gender and Sexual Politics of Late-Qing China (Thesis). University of Oregon.
- Liu, Wenjia (July 2014). "Lover-Sister: Female Same-sex Desire and Women's Agency in Feng shuangfei". Intersections: Gender and Sexuality in Asia and the Pacific (35). doi:10.25911/5SSZ-DC57.
- Liu, Wenjia (2016). "Virtuous Wives and Shrews in Feng Shuangfei: Empowering Female Characters through a Revision of Stereotypes". Journal of Chinese Literature and Culture. 3 (1): 57–84. doi:10.1215/23290048-3461820.
- Wang, Dongfang (1998). "Cheng Huiying". In Lee, Lily Xiao Hong; Stefanowaka, A. D.; Ho, Clara Wing-chung (eds.). A Biographical Dictionary of Chinese Women: The Qing Period, 1844–1911. M.E. Sharpe. pp. 26–27. ISBN 978-0-7656-1827-6.
- Wang, Juan (2012). Merry Laughter and Angry Curses: The Shanghai Tabloid Press, 1897-1911. Contemporary Chinese Studies. Vancouver: University of British Columbia Press. ISBN 978-0-7748-2340-1.
- Yeh, Catherine Vance (2006). Shanghai Love: Courtesans, Intellectuals, and Entertainment Culture, 1850-1910. Seattle: University of Washington Press. ISBN 978-0-295-98567-1.
- Zhang, Wanrong (2024). "The Daoist Art of the Bedchamber of Male Homosexuality in Ming and Qing Literature". Religions. 15 (7) 841. doi:10.3390/rel15070841.
