= A Conspiracy of Friends =

Book by Alexander McCall Smith

- Author: Alexander McCall Smith
- Language: English
- Series: Corduroy Mansions
- Subject: The inhabitants of Corduroy Mansions
- Genre: Fiction
- Publisher: Polygon
- Publication date: 1 May 2011
- Publication place: United Kingdom
- Media type: Hardback
- Pages: 368
- ISBN: 978-18469-7182-2
- Preceded by: The Dog Who Came in from the Cold

A Conspiracy of Friends is the third online novel by Alexander McCall Smith, author of The No. 1 Ladies' Detective Agency series. In the first series, the author wrote a chapter a day, starting from 15 September 2008, and the series ran for 20 weeks, totalling 100 episodes. The daily chapters, read by Andrew Sachs, were also available as an audio download. The second and third series were published online, running from Monday 21 September 2009 and Monday 13 September 2010, respectively.

== Episodic writing ==
The concept for the Corduroy Mansions series is based on Charles Dickens’ episodic writing, novels that were serialised through journals in weekly or monthly instalments, in the 1800s. Following a meeting with acclaimed San Francisco novelist Armistead Maupin, Alexander McCall Smith pursued this method of writing in 2004 with his novel 44 Scotland Street. The story was serialised in instalments every weekday through The Scotsman newspaper.

As Corduroy Mansions and its successors was released online, readers had the opportunity to interact with each other and the author himself through online discussion boards. This was edited by the Daily Telegraph staff.

The project is a collaboration between Telegraph Media Group, Little Brown and Polygon (the fiction imprint of Birlinn).

== Plot ==
The story is set in a fictional housing unit in London nicknamed Corduroy Mansions, and details the lives of the inhabitants of the large Pimlico house and others.

The main characters are Barbara Ragg, Basil Wickramsinghe, Berthea Snark, Caroline Jarvis, Dee Binder, Eddie French, Freddie de la Hay, Jenny Hedge, Jo Partlin, Marcia Light, Oedipus Snark, Terence Moongrove, and William French.

The chapters for this book in The Telegraph ran from 13 September 2010 until 17 December 2010.
