= Espresso Tales =

Novel by Alexander McCall Smith

- First edition
- Author: Alexander McCall Smith
- Cover artist: Iain McIntosh
- Language: English
- Genre: Serial novel
- Publisher: The Scotsman (serial), Polygon Books (book form)
- Publication date: 2004-2005 (orig. serial) 2005 (novel form)
- Publication place: Scotland
- Media type: Print (Hardback & Paperback) & Serial
- ISBN: 978-0-349-11970-0
- OCLC: 62796274
- Preceded by: 44 Scotland Street
- Followed by: Love over Scotland

Espresso Tales is a novel by Alexander McCall Smith, the author of The No. 1 Ladies' Detective Agency. The story was first published as a serial novel in The Scotsman, like its predecessor, 44 Scotland Street. The book retains the 100+ short chapters of the original.

== Plot introduction ==
The novel continues to follow Pat Macgregor, a student who has taken a second gap year and who is unsure about her future direction, and the lives of her friends, roommates and fellow tenants at 44 Scotland Street.

== Plot summary ==
Pat is still sharing a flat with Bruce, the good-looking egoist, although she is no longer attracted to him. She decides to go back to university and obtains a place at Edinburgh, but still works part-time in Matthew's art gallery. Her friend and neighbour Domenica, the anthropologist, tries to help Pat with her love life by making the acquaintance of a good-looking waiter, but when he takes her to a nudist picnic Pat realises he is not for her. Domenica develops an interest in pirates and makes plans to travel to the South China Sea for some field-work.

Matthew is upset when his wealthy businessman father finds a girlfriend, and misjudges her motives. He confides in Big Lou at the cafe, who has learned that her long-lost lover is returning to Scotland and hopes to resume their relationship. Far from being a gold-digger, Matthew's father's girlfriend persuades him to give Matthew £4 million. Matthew still cherishes feelings for Pat, but they are not returned.

Ramsey Dunbarton, the lawyer, writes his memoirs and reads them to his wife.

Stuart and Irene Pollock continue to hothouse their five-year-old son Bertie Pollock, whom Irene regards as a child prodigy. He yearns to go to Watson's school and play rugby, even securing a blazer and sneaking into lessons, but is sent to the Steiner School instead. He remains in psychotherapy, and his mother is impressed and attracted by the therapist, Dr Fairbairn, who is troubled by guilt. Bertie and his father have an adventure, travelling to Glasgow on the train to recover their car, which Stuart has left there accidentally. They meet a gangster, Lard O'Connor, who takes a fancy to Bertie and helps them recover their car, but Bertie soon realises that although the registration number is the same, the car is not. Stuart realises how hard life is for Bertie because of his mother's expectations, and begins to stand up for his son a little more. Irene insults Angus Lordie's dog Cyril, who bites her. She announces that she is pregnant.

Bruce loses his job after he is caught enjoying a romantic meal with his employer's wife, and is rejected by his American girlfriend. He decides to become a wine merchant and almost persuades a rich friend into partnership, but is foiled by the friend's girlfriend, to whom he is rude and dismissive. He fears that some Chateau Petrus he has bought cheaply may be bogus, but it is genuine and with the profit he makes on it at auction he moves to London and puts the flat at 44 Scotland Street up for sale.
