= Scotland Street =

Scotland Street may refer to:

- Scotland Street, Suffolk
- Scotland Street, Glasgow
- A street in Edinburgh, the setting for the 44 Scotland Street novels of Alexander McCall Smith
