= Janet Irwin =

New Zealand doctor

Janet Irwin AM
- Born: Janet Rickord McCall Smith; 14 September 1923; Rawene, New Zealand
- Died: 20 March 2009 (aged 85); Nelson, New Zealand
- Education: University of Otago
- Known for: Activism for child and women's health

Janet Rickord McCall Irwin AM (née Smith; 14 September 1923 – 20 March 2009) was a New Zealand medical practitioner who also worked in Australia. She specialised in student and women's health at the University of Canterbury and University of Queensland, and was an activist for women's health and broader social issues.

== Early life ==
Irwin was born in Rawene, New Zealand, on 14 September 1923. She was the daughter of Lucy Smith and Dr George McCall Smith, the founder of the Hokianga area health service. She had one brother, Jock, who died at the age of 10 in 1932. She had four half-siblings in Scotland from her father's first marriage to Barbara Grieve. In 1914, her father had left his first wife and children in Scotland and travelled to New Zealand with one of his patients Lucy Scott whom he married in 1921. One of her father's grandsons from that marriage is the law professor and writer, Alexander McCall Smith.

== Career ==
Irwin studied medicine at the University of Otago for almost five years but disappointed her father by getting married before completing her degree. After her marriage ended she returned to medical school and graduated in 1963.

She worked at the Royal Hospital for Sick Children in Edinburgh after winning a scholarship to study psychological problems in young people. Concluding that “every child should be a wanted child” she began campaigning for abortion law reform.

Irwin took up a position at the University of Canterbury in student health, advocating on health issues of students especially women students.

From 1974 to 1978 she was director of Student Health Services at the University of Queensland. She was also the university’s first sexual harassment conciliator. While living in Australia she served on government bodies on immigration, social welfare, health, women and criminal justice including the Better Health Commission and Criminal Justice Commission. Other spheres of activity included the Queensland Council for Civil Liberties, the Brisbane Women’s Network and other lobby groups.

== Honours and awards ==
Irwin was made a Member of the Order of Australia in 1991 for service to women’s affairs and the community. She was awarded a Centenary Medal in 2001.

== Personal life ==
Irwin’s father, who was opposed to her marriage, did not attend her wedding to Air Force officer Peter Irwin in 1944. McCall Smith’s role at the wedding was fulfilled by Douglas Robb. The Irwins lived at Paraparaumu. In 1948 her parents moved to Waikanae from Rawene to live near their daughter's family. The Irwins' marriage ended in 1962. They had three children.

Irwin died in Nelson on 20 March 2009.

A biography of Irwin A Prescription for Action: The Life of Dr Janet Irwin was published in 2016.

== Publications ==
- Furnival CM, Irwin JR, Gray GM. (1983) ‘Breast disease in young women. When is biopsy indicated?’ Medical Journal of Australia. Vol. 2, no. 4 p. 167–9. doi: 10.5694/j.1326-5377.1983.tb122396.x. PMID 6877161.
- Irwin, J, De Vries S, Wilson, SS, & Sparling, J. (1998). Raising girls: The pleasures, the perils, the pitfalls. Brisbane, Qld.: Pandanus Press.
