= Tanci =

Chinese song genre that mixed verse and prose

- Traditional Chinese: 彈詞
- Simplified Chinese: 弹词
- Literal meaning: Plucking rhymes
Transcriptions
Standard Mandarin
- Hanyu Pinyin: Táncí
- Wade–Giles: T'an^{2}-tz'u^{2}
- IPA: [tʰǎntsʰɹ̩̌]

Tanci is a narrative form of song in China that alternates between verse and prose. The literal name "plucking rhymes" refers to the singing of verse portions to a pipa. A tanci is usually seven words long. On some occasions the length is ten words. Some scholars refer to tanci as "plucking rhymes," "southern singing narrative," "story-sining," "strum lyrics". The local forms of Tanci encompasses Suzhou Tanci, Yangzhou Tanci, Siming Nanci, Shaoxing Pinghudiao, etc.

Tanci consists of both spoken storytelling and sung ballads. Another distinct narrative style is pinghua, a storytelling art form which is purely spoken. The word pingtan is used as a collective term to refer to tanci and pinghua.

The three most famous tanci are the Zaishengyuan ("Lovers through Time") by Chen Duansheng, Tianyuhua ("A Rain of Flowers") by Tao Zhenhuai, and Bishenghua ("Flowers from her Brush") by Qiu Xinru.

== History ==
Historically tanci was a popular art form with women in the lower Yangtze River Valley, specifically the Jiangnan region. It originated as a popular literary genre in the Ming dynasty. In the mid-to-late Qing dynasty it became popular with educated women who wrote and performed the music and who were the genre's audience and reader base. One example is Phoenixes Flying Together by Cheng Huiying, which was issued in several print editions between 1897 and 1899.

Women's tanci often are about their philosophy of literary creation, the sentiments of the author, and descriptions of seasons. Lingzhen Wang, author of Personal Matters: Women's Autobiographical Practice in Twentieth-century China, wrote that "some scholars have even suggested that Chinese women consciously seized upon tanci to express their gendered experiences and to create a female literary tradition different from the male-dominated genres of novels and stories."

During the Qing dynasty it was not only used for entertainment but also for political and social propaganda. The Gengzi Guobian Tanci, a tanci by Li Baojia (Li Boyuan) written about the Boxer Rebellion, is an example of a political tanci.
