= Modern Times (novel) =

1906 novel by Boyuan Li

- Chinese: 文明小史
- Literal meaning: Short History of Civilization or A Brief History of Modern Times or A Brief History of Enlightenment
Transcriptions
Standard Mandarin
- Hanyu Pinyin: Wénmíng Xiǎoshǐ
- Wade–Giles: Wen-ming Hsiao-shih

Cover of Wenming Xiaoshi (Modern Times), from the Fudan University

Introduction of the novel (volume one) in a 1915 edition

Wenming Xiaoshi (Chinese: 文明小史), translated into English as Modern Times, is a novel by Li Baojia (Li Boyuan). The novel is a satire of pseudo-reformers in the Qing dynasty period who found difficulty adjusting to modernization, including its complexities and problems. The novel consist of 60 chapters. It has often been compared to Li's other novel Officialdom Unmasked. From 1903 to 1905 the work was serialized in Fiction Illustrated. The first edition of the entire work was published in 1906. Douglas Lancashire published an English translation, titled "Modern Times," in 1996.

== Plot ==
The background of the novel is that in the late Qing dynasty, China's borders were opened by the West. At that time, conservative Chinese people saw the strong ship and sharp cannon of modern Western civilization, leading to the rise of the reformist movement, and many people were sent to study abroad. The article adopts a "Zhulian style" structure, without the protagonist and central character. Their stories unfold one after another, interconnected, and finally concluded in the final chapter.

== Characters ==
- Master Yao - He is a provincial degree holder with a son. In chapter 16, Master Yao takes his son and three disciplines to Shanghai in order to show them what Western life looks like to them. Master Yao has them explore the city and familiarize themselves with the academic programs at schools in the area.
