= Xiong Lian =

- Born: 1758
- Occupation: Poet

Xiong Lian 熊璉 born 1758, from Rugao in Jiangsu province, was a woman poet of the Qing dynasty. Her courtesy name (字) was Shangzhen 商珍 and her hao 號 was Danxian 澹僊. She also went by the name Ruxue Shanren 茹雪山人.

She wrote a text called Mingyuan shihua, which compiled biographical information on women poets. It was an important influence on Shen Shanbao's text of the same name. When she discovered that her husband was disabled she refused to break off their engagement, despite the fact that his family was willing to break it off, a decision that won her a degree of celebrity. But despite the celebrity she lived in poverty for most of her life, and indeed the poverty of her husband's family seems to have impelled her to return to live with her native family. She relied on support from her family and earned a living teaching other women. She composed ci (song lyrics) and the songs which remain are of remarkable diversity.

Some of her work has been translated into English. See, for example, the translations by Waiyee Li, Ellen Widmer and Weijing Lu.

Chinese texts of some of Xiong's poems may be found at Ming Qing Women Writer's Database
