= Corduroy Mansions =

Novel by Alexander McCall Smith

- First edition
- Author: Alexander McCall Smith
- Language: English
- Series: Corduroy Mansions
- Subject: The inhabitants of Corduroy Mansions
- Genre: Fiction
- Publisher: Polygon
- Publication date: 1 Aug 2009
- Publication place: United Kingdom
- Media type: Hardback
- Pages: 358
- ISBN: 978-18469-7121-1
- Followed by: The Dog Who Came in from the Cold

Corduroy Mansions is the first online novel by Alexander McCall Smith. In the first series, the author wrote a chapter a day, starting on 15 Sep 2008, the series running for 20 weeks and totaling 100 episodes. The daily chapters, read by Andrew Sachs were also available as an audio download. The second and third series were published online, running from Monday 21 September 2009 and Monday 13 September 2010, respectively.

== Episodic writing ==
The concept for Corduroy Mansions is based on Charles Dickens’ episodic writing – which were novels serialised through journals in weekly or monthly instalments, in the 1800s. Following a meeting with acclaimed San Francisco novelist Armistead Maupin, Alexander McCall Smith pursued this method of writing in 2004 with his novel 44 Scotland Street. The story was serialised in instalments every weekday through The Scotsman newspaper.

As Corduroy Mansions was released online, readers had the opportunity to interact with each other and the author himself through online discussion boards. This was edited by the Daily Telegraph staff.

The project is a collaboration between Telegraph Media Group, Little Brown and Polygon (the fiction imprint of Birlinn Ltd).

== Plot ==
The story is set in a fictional housing unit in London nicknamed Corduroy Mansions, and details the lives of the inhabitants of the large Pimlico house and others.

The main characters are Barbara Ragg, Basil Wickramsinghe, Berthea Snark, Caroline Jarvis, Dee Binder, Eddie French, Freddie de la Hay, Jenny Hedge, Jo Partlin, Marcia Light, Oedipus Snark, Terence Moongrove, and William French.

Book two in the award-winning Corduroy Mansions series, The Dog Who Came in from the Cold, ran from 21 Sept 2009 until 19 Dec 2009.

Book three in the series, A Conspiracy of Friends, ran from 13 Sept 2010 until 17 Dec 2010.
