= Gengzi Guobian Tanci =

- Traditional Chinese: 庚子國變彈詞
- Simplified Chinese: 庚子国变弹词
Transcriptions
Standard Mandarin
- Hanyu Pinyin: Gēngzǐguóbiàn Táncí
- Wade–Giles: Keng^{1}-tzu^{3} kuo^{2}-pien^{4} t'an^{2}-tz'u^{2}

Gengzi Guobian Tanci (Chinese: 庚子國變彈詞; "Tanci, on the Boxer Rebellion of 1900" or "The tanci of the national calamity of 1900" or "The National Disturbances of the Year Gengzi") is a tanci written by Li Baojia (Li Boyuan), composed in 1902.

Written immediately after the Boxer Rebellion, it was Li Baojia's first major literary work, serialized in the Shanghai Shijie Fanhua Bao. He wrote this tanci in order to remind the public of the event as a historical lesson, to show an accurate picture of the event, and so the memories of the event would remain fresh. Li Baojia said that he chose the tanci form because it would be easy for the common people including women and children to understand the song and make them remember the incident it was named after. It is an example of a tanci for a political and social purpose.

The work portrays the Boxers as being foolish and fraudulent, and it portrays the officials who supported the Boxers as being crooked. That viewpoint is considered politically incorrect in China as of 2010. Wilt L. Idema wrote in the article "Prosimetric and verse narrative" within The Cambridge History of Chinese Literature: From 1375, that because of the portrayal of the Boxers and their supporters, Gengzi Guobian Tanci "is neglected by modern scholars".

== See also ==
- Boxers and Saints
