= Shen Shanbao =

Chinese poet and writer

Shen Shanbao (沈善宝, 1808–1862) courtesy name Xiangpei 湘佩 and style name Xihu sanren 西湖散人 was a Chinese poet and writer active during the Qing Dynasty. She is the author of the Mingyuan Shihua, which provided biographical material on 500 Qing women poets, including herself.

== Biography ==
She was born in Hangzhou, which in the early nineteenth century was a center for women artists and writers. Shen's father committed suicide in 1819 and her mother died in 1832. She sold her paintings and poetry to support herself. In 1837, in a marriage arranged by her foster mother, she married Wu Lingyun 武凌云, a high official and holder of the jinshi degree (the highest civil service degree). She was Wu's second wife; upon her marriage she became stepmother to his children. After her marriage to Wu, she moved to Beijing.

In Beijing, Shen made contact with a circle of women writers, including Liang Desheng, Xu Yunjiang, Xu Zongyan, Gu Taiqing, Gong Zihang (the sister of Gong Zichen) and Li Peijin. She was also important as a teacher; she was known to have more than a hundred female disciples. She was also friends with the writer Ding Pei, who wrote a preface for her first poetry collection in 1836.

Some of her work has been translated into English. (Note: See translations by Ellen Widmer; Cathy Silber and Ren Zipang; and Grace Fong.)

== See also ==
- Qing poetry

== Sources ==
- "Fong Embroidery Paper", Columbia University, last accessed June 9, 2007
- Wang Lijian王力堅, Qingdai caiyuan Shen Shanbao yanjiu,清代才媛沈善寳研究 (A Study of the Qing Poet Shan Shanbao) Taipei: Liren shuju, 2009.
