= Chilwell and Trevithick =

New Zealand architectural partnership

Chilwell and Trevithick was an architectural partnership formed in Auckland, New Zealand, in 1914.

The two members of the partnership, Benjamin Charles Chilwell and Cecil Trevithick, designed numerous buildings around Auckland many of which have heritage registration. These include several commercial buildings in the Auckland CBD, as well as many private homes in Epsom, Remuera, and the Eastern Bays (Ōrākei, Mission Bay, Kohimarama, Saint Heliers, and Glendowie). Their early buildings were done in Arts and Crafts style but later work is described as eclectic. Although most of their work was based around Auckland they did design buildings out of the area including as far as Thames.

== Benjamin Charles Chilwell ==
Benjamin Charles Chilwell (1879–1950) was born in Wednesbury, Staffordshire, England on 28 August 1879. Chilwell trained in architecture in Birmingham, England. He studied at the Birmingham School of Art until 1904 and worked as an architect in Wednesbury. Chilwell emigrated to New Zealand in 1907. He was a member of the Royal Institute of British Architects. Chilwell initially worked as a draughtsman before working as an architect. Chilwell served as chairman to the Auckland branch of the New Zealand Institute of Architects as well as an institute Councillor for the organisation. He was a representative for architecture at the Auckland Rotary Club. Chilwell was a member of the Masonic Order. He died in 1950, aged 71.

== Cecil Trevithick ==
Cecil Trevithick (1880–1967) was born in Auckland, New Zealand on 28 April 1880. He worked for J. S. Turner for 4 years from 1899, then working as an assistant to George Wilfred Allsop until moving to London in 1906. In London he apprenticed under Horace Gilbert until 1907 when he qualified as an architect. In 1908 he became an associate of the Royal Institute of British Architects and returned to New Zealand. He designed buildings in Tahiti and Ōpōtiki before partnering with Chilwell. In 1912 he came third in a competition to design a Freemasons Lodge on Queen Street. Trevithick retired in the 1940s and died in 1967.

== List of buildings ==
Name	Date	Image	Note	Ref
Elmstone	1910		Registered as a category 2 building. Only designed by Chilwell	
St Ann's	1914		Registered as a category 2 building. Only designed by Chilwell	
Endeans Building	1914		Registered as a category 2 building with Heritage New Zealand	
Myers Kindergarten	1916		Registered as a category 2 building with Heritage New Zealand	
Whitcombe and Tombs Building	1916			
Royal Exchange Assurance Building	1920		Registered as a category B building with Auckland City Council	
St Andrew's Church, Epsom	1924		Designed an addition to the church. Chilwell also designed an addition in 1914 independently	
24 Hinemoa Street	1925		Registered as a category B building with Auckland Council	
Auckland Sun Building	1927			
Nestle Factory	1927		Now the Axis Building	
Ye Jolly Farmer Inn, Drury	1928			
Rawene Hospital, Rawene	1928			
Rutland Building	1929			
Housing Corporation Building/Auckland Senior College	c.1930		Registered as a category 2 building with Heritage New Zealand	
Thames Plunket Building	1933		Relocated to Pipiroa	
Myers Family home	1937			
Arthur Eady Building	1939		Registered as a category 2 building with Heritage New Zealand. Also known as the Prudential Building	
Papakura Centennial Restroom and Plunket Building	1940		Registered as a category B building with Auckland Council	
Maritime Building	c.1946			
Grigg Homestead	1937		Registered as a category 1 building with Heritage New Zealand. Attributed to Chilwell and Trevithick by one author but not others.	
