= James Reddy Clendon =

New Zealand farmer (1800–1872)

James Reddy Clendon (1 October 1800 – 26 October 1872) was an early European settler in New Zealand, the first United States Consul to New Zealand, and he was a witness to the Declaration of the Independence of New Zealand (1835) and the Treaty of Waitangi (1840).

== Early life ==
Clendon was born in 1800 in Deal, Kent, England, the son of George Clendon and Elizabeth Chitty. He started business as a shipowner in London with his brother, John Chitty Clendon. He married Sarah Hill in Sydney on 2 October 1826 and their first child, James Stephenson Clendon, was born in London in January 1827.

== Career ==
=== New Zealand ===
In 1828, as captain of the City of Edinburgh, he transported female convicts to Sydney and then sailed to New Zealand to pick up spars. His wife Sarah Clendon was on the voyage, and in January 1829, at sea near Hokianga, she gave birth to their second child, Eliza. In 1830 he visited the Bay of Islands and bought 220 acres (0.9 km^{2}) of land from Pōmare II and Kiwikiwi, of Ngāti Manu, at Okiato, a few miles south of Kororareka. The Clendon family returned to London in 1830.

Clendon purchased the schooner Fortitude and, with his family and business partner Samuel Stephenson, sailed back to New Zealand in 1832. He settled on his property at Okiato and established a successful trading station supplying whaling ships working in the Pacific Ocean. His friendship with Pōmare II, Tamati Waka Nene and other Maori chiefs and his contact with the European settlers at Kororareka made him more influential than the British Resident, James Busby, at Waitangi. When Frenchman Baron Charles de Thierry tried to set himself up as 'sovereign chief' at Hokianga, Clendon supported Busby's efforts to form a confederation of northern Maori chiefs and he witnessed the Declaration of the Independence of New Zealand on 28 October 1835 together with Gilbert Mair.

=== US Consul ===
Clendon's Grant.'"`UNIQ--ref-00000002-QINU`"''"`UNIQ--ref-00000003-QINU`"' '"`UNIQ--templatestyles-00000004-QINU`"'
'"`UNIQ--templatestyles-00000005-QINU`"'
Granted to James Reddy Clendon
'"`UNIQ--templatestyles-00000006-QINU`"'
Extent of the "Fairburn purchase"

On 12 October 1838, Clendon was appointed United States Consul at the Bay of Islands, New Zealand. As a result, he gained most of the trade with American whaling and trading ships visiting the Bay of Islands. He remained consul until April 1841. Despite representing the U.S., he assisted Captain William Hobson in negotiating the recognition of British sovereignty over New Zealand and was a witness to the signing of the Treaty of Waitangi in February 1840. Felton Mathew, the Surveyor-General, selected Clendon's Okiato property as the most suitable location in the Bay of Islands to establish the capital of the colony. Clendon wanted 23,000 pounds for the 1.24 km² of land, the house, two small cottages, a large store and other buildings but eventually agreed to accept 15,000 pounds. However he received only 2,250 pounds in cash and 10,000 acres (40 km^{2}) of land south of Auckland. The suburb of Clendon Park in Manukau City is named after him.

=== Farming and politics ===
From 1841 he farmed on 3,342 acres (14 km^{2}) of land he had purchased at Manawaora in the Bay of Islands in 1838. He became the president of the New Zealand Banking Company, the owner of New Zealand's first bank which opened at Kororareka in September 1840. Also in 1840 he became a justice of the peace and was a member of New Zealand's first Legislative Council from 1840 to 1844. He was appointed as the police magistrate at the Bay of Islands in 1845 and advised the British military during the Flagstaff War. From about 1846 his role of magistrate was extended to include Hokianga.

=== Second Marriage ===
In 1855, his wife Sarah died. On 9 January 1856, the 55-year-old Clendon married 18-year-old Jane Cochrane, daughter of Dennis Cochrane of Hokianga and his late wife, Takatowai Te Whata. Jane Cochrane was also known as Mihi Kerene and Jane Takotowi Clendon and was born on 28 July 1838 in Hokianga, New Zealand. Jane had an Irish father and a Maori mother. Clendon had six children with his first wife and eight with his second. In 1862, James and Jane settled at Rawene where he continued as magistrate until 1867. He died at Rawene on either 24 or 26 October 1872. His second wife, Jane, died in 1919.

Heritage New Zealand owns Clendon House at Rawene, which was built in the 1860s, and keeps it open to the public.

== Legacy ==
The Clendon family papers, including material written by his wives, were archived by Heritage New Zealand and Auckland Libraries. In 2022, this material was inscribed on the UNESCO Memory of the World Aotearoa New Zealand Ngā Mahara o te Ao register.
