= Shanghai Shijie Fanhua Bao =

Newspaper published in Shanghai, China

- Traditional Chinese: 上海世界繁華報
- Simplified Chinese: 上海世界繁华报
- Literal meaning: The Bustling World of Shanghai" or "Shanghai Splendor" or "The Glittering World"
Transcriptions
Standard Mandarin
- Hanyu Pinyin: Shànghǎi Shìjiè Fánhuá Bào
- Wade–Giles: Shanghai Shih-chieh Fan-hua Pao

Shanghai Shijie Fanhua Bao (Chinese: 上海世界繁華報) was a periodical published in Shanghai, China. The name is often shortened to Fanhua Bao or Shijie Fanhua Bao ("World Vanity Fair" or "The Glittering World").

Li Baojia (Li Boyuan) was the founder. The main editors were Ouyang Gan (歐陽淦; 欧阳淦; Ōuyáng Gàn; Ou-yang Kan) and Ren Guangjin (任光覲; 任光觐; Rén Guāngjìn; Jen Kuang-chin). It was founded on May 7, 1901. Publication ended on April 22, 1910.

== Works serialized ==
Serialized works include:

- Gengzi Guobian Tanci by Li Baojia
- Officialdom Unmasked by Li Baojia (the first half of the work, serialized there from April 1903 to June 1905.)

== Staff ==
- Li Baojia (contributor and editor)
