= St Ann's (Remuera) =

Heritage building in Auckland, New Zealand

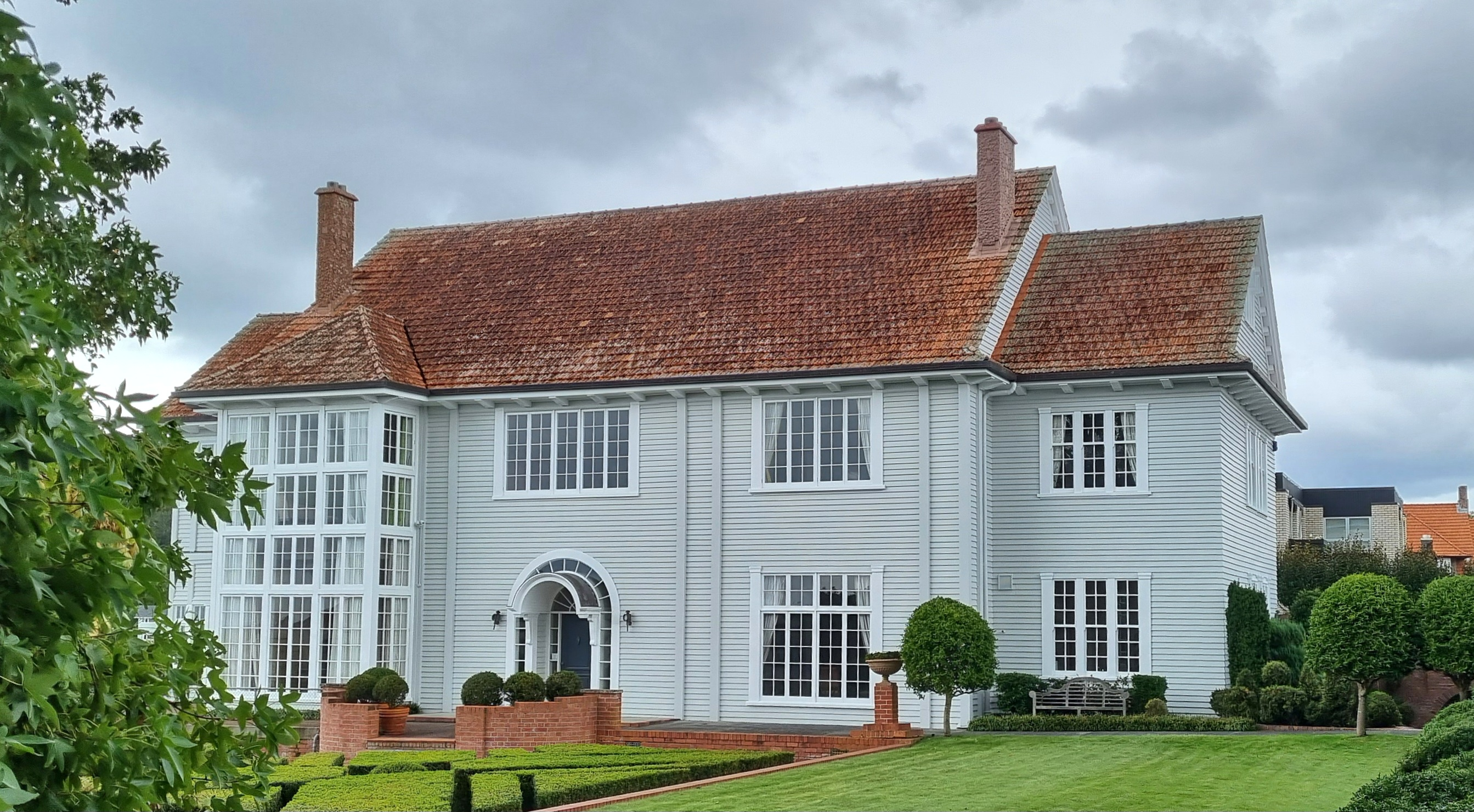
- Front of St Ann's

General information
- Architectural style: Arts and Crafts
- Location: Remuera, 43 Arney Road, Remuera
- Coordinates: 36°52′21″S 174°47′19″E
- Year built: 1914–c.1915

Design and construction
- Architect: Benjamin Charles Chilwell

Heritage New Zealand – Category 2
- Designated: 11 November 1981
- Reference no.: 2643

St Ann's is a historic English country cottage in Remuera, Auckland, New Zealand. Built in the early 20th century for a wealthy owner, St Ann's was later used by the Auckland Kindergarten Association before being sold back into private ownership. It is registered as a category 2 building with Heritage New Zealand.

== Description ==
St Ann's is an English country cottage designed in the Arts and Crafts style, with some Georgian revival influence, constructed from timber with a masonry foundation. It originally had 15 rooms, with five bedrooms on the first floor. It had a grand hallway, casement windows, and a Marseille tiled roof. The tall brick chimneys have an art deco-like motif. The entrance to the garden is reminiscent of the lych-gate of a rural church. An engine house and laundry were located south of the home. St Ann's sits amongst landscaped, parterre, and terraced gardens on a 3,062 m^{2} (3,662 sq yd) section. The façade faces towards the Waitematā Harbour instead of towards the street.

== History ==
In 1883 the lot to the site was purchased. It changed hands three times before St Ann's was built.

A building originally stood on the site but by September 1911 it was no longer there, likely destroyed by a fire. In 1914 the property title was purchased by Charles Nathan, son of Arthur Nathan who ran a successful merchant business in Auckland. Charles chose to live in the nearby Remuera, which was popular with the Auckland bourgeoisie. Charles hired Benjamin Chilwell to design a home and plans were drawn up in March 1914. The home cost £2,900 and was most likely completed sometime between December 1914 and February 1915. The earliest evidence of the home being complete is an advertisement from November 1915.

The name St Ann's is first recorded in 1929, during that same year the balcony was glazed. Between 1932 and 1945 the Nathans hosted fête at their home to raise money for charitable causes including the Second World War, the Newmarket Kindergarten, and the National Association for the Blind. In 1934 the drawing room was extended outwards. In 1938 the porch was enclosed. Before 1944 a brick wall with timber lattice inserts was built along the front boundary replacing an earlier wire fence. In 1950 a gardener's flat and garage was constructed at the southern end of the property. In 1955 the Nathans sold the property to the Auckland Kindergarten Association. In the 1960s the southern portion of the property was subdivided for housing on a new street.

The Auckland Kindergarten Association used St Ann's as a training college until the Auckland Teachers' College took over the training of kindergarten teachers; it was then used to teach graduate teachers until 1977 when it became a teachers' centre. During this period weatherboards were installed replacing earlier ornamentation. In 1983 the Auckland Kindergarten Association sold the property to Walter John Strevens. Strevens was a Manukau City councillor and served as deputy-mayor of Auckland City.

Strevens made multiple alterations and additions in 1984: he had a Edwin Lutyens style bay window that spans both storeys of the house installed, some windows were repositioned, ornamental ventilation was installed on the street facing side of the home, a door was inserted to lead to the gardens, the chimneys were painted covering up the motifs, and the main entranceway was altered to have an arch and fanlight, and the porch and shutters for louvre windows were removed. In 2006 the property was subdivided for housing which led to the demolition of the aviary and an outbuilding. In 2007 a folly clad in copper was erected. The building currently serves as a private residence. The Strevens sold the property in 2021.
