= Clendon House =

Historic house in New Zealand

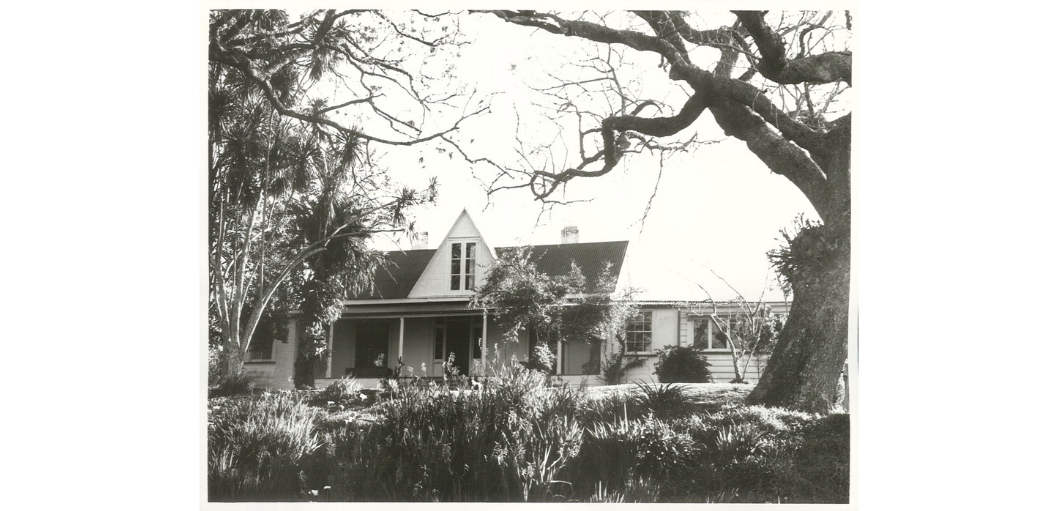
- Clendon House, 1974
- Interactive map of the Clendon House area

General information
- Type: House
- Architectural style: Georgian; Gothic Revival
- Location: Rawene, New Zealand, 14 Parnell Street, Rawene
- Coordinates: 35°23′39″S 173°30′21″E.
- Named for: James Reddy Clendon
- Year built: 1866–1872

Technical details
- Material: Timber

Website
- www.visitheritage.co.nz/visit/northland/clendon-house

Heritage New Zealand – Category 1
- Designated: 23 June 1983
- Reference no.: 73

Clendon House is a historic dwelling in Rawene, in the Hokianga Harbour in the Far North region of New Zealand that is listed as a Category I building by Heritage New Zealand. Clendon House was built in the late 1860s to early 1870s for James Reddy Clendon, a magistrate at Rawene, to serve as a home for his family. It is now managed by Heritage New Zealand as a museum.

== History ==
In 1832, James Reddy Clendon, an English sea captain, settled in the Bay of Islands and set up a trading post at Okiato, near Kororāreka (now known as Russell), where he had acquired some land on a previous visit to the area. He became well known in the community, serving as United States consul from 1838 to 1841 and later became police magistrate at the Bay of Islands. In 1862 he and his family moved to the township of Rawene, in the Hokianga Harbour, where he was the magistrate of the Native Circuit Court.

After a few years at Rawene, known at the time as Herd's Point, Clendon arranged for the construction of what was to become known as Clendon House in 1866. He retired from his public service duties the year afterwards and reverted to his mercantile career. While the family moved into the house around 1869, additions were subsequently made to the house. By 1872 it was completed.

Although Clendon died in October 1872, his wife and eight children continued to live in the property. He had left the family with several debts but his wife, Jane Cochrane, who was part-Māori, was able to retrieve the situation with careful management. Clendon's debts were settled by 1881. Jane resided in the property until her death in 1919. The house remained in the ownership of the Clendon family until 1972, when it, and its contents, was purchased by the New Zealand Historic Places Trust (NZHPT). Repair work on the property was undertaken in 1974.

== Design ==
Built out of kauri timber painted white and roofed with wood shingles, Clendon House has elements of both Georgian and Gothic Revival architectural styles, with a gable roof and gabled dormers. It had four rooms on the ground floor arranged about a central hallway, with two further rooms upstairs. A detached kitchen building, originally built by Clendon when he first moved to Rawene in 1862, was subsequently integrated into Clendon House when later modifications extended the northern verandah to include an additional bedroom that was built up against the kitchen building. The original roof was replaced with red painted corrugated iron in 1910.

== Legacy ==
Clendon House was listed as a Category I building by the NZHPT on 23 June 1983. Factors in its heritage listing is the connections to the early colonial history of the Hokianga, and to Clendon and his wife. It is managed by Heritage New Zealand, the successor to the NZHPT, as a museum.
