= George McCall Smith =

Scottish medical doctor (1882–1958)

George Marshall McCall Smith (13 November 1882 – 27 December 1958) was a Scottish medical doctor, medical superintendent and community leader in New Zealand. He was born in Nairn, Scotland in 1882, emigrating to New Zealand in 1914. For 34 years he ran Rawene Hospital, campaigned for state funding of health and is remembered for creating a health service for the remote Hokianga area.

== Early life and career ==
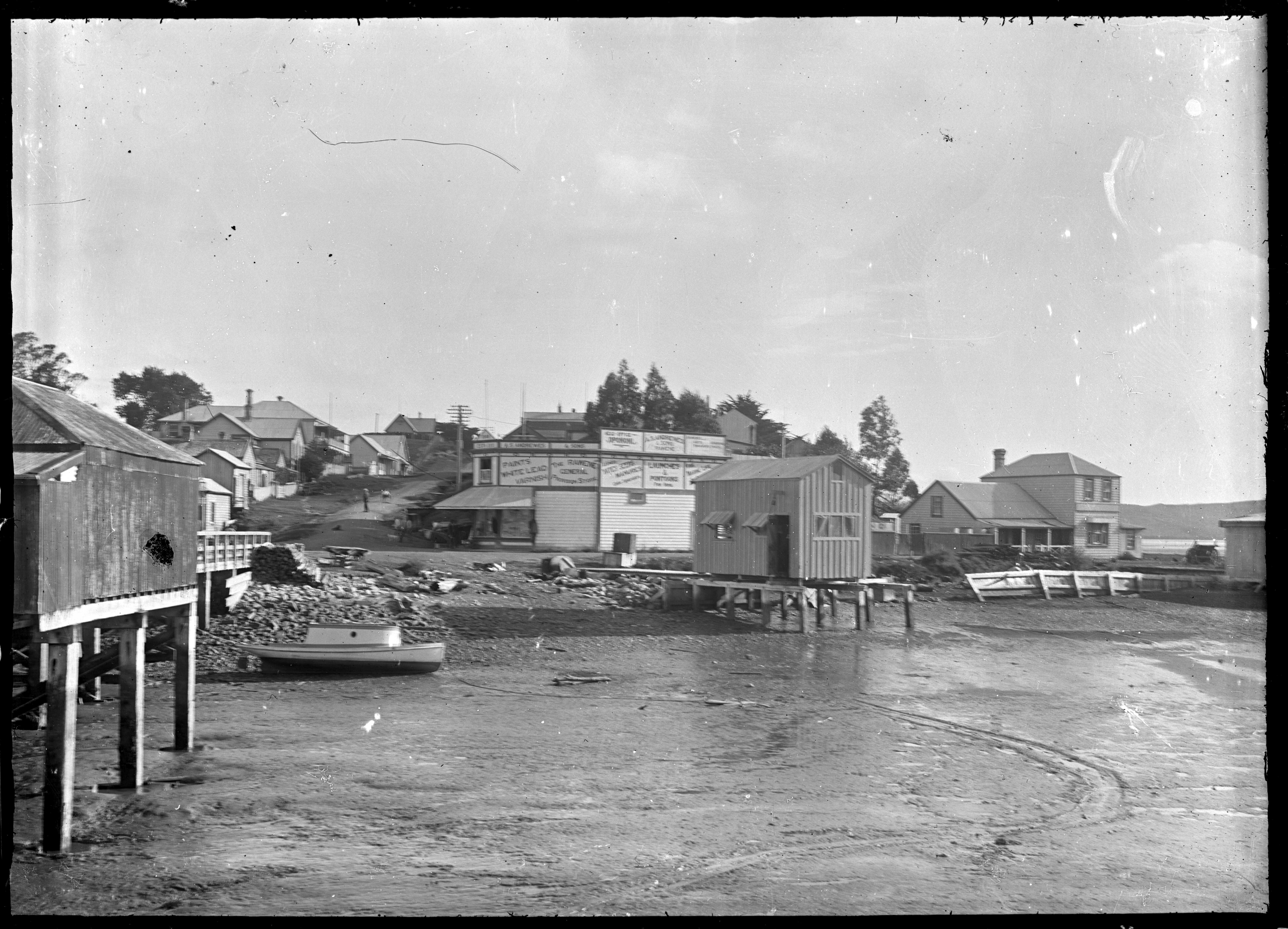
View of Rawene township in 1918

George McCall Smith was born in Nairn, Scotland on 13 November 1882. He completed his medical degree at the University of Edinburgh, and went into general practice in Strathmiglo, Fife, and Perth. In 1907 he married Barbara Grieve with whom he had two sons and two daughters. Leaving his family he took off for London with one of his patients, Lucy Scott, and thence to New Zealand in 1914.

== Career in New Zealand ==
Smith arrived in Rawene in the Hokianga, a remote community on the north island, with Lucy Scott in September 1914. The population was impoverished with 60% indigenous Māori. He was appointed Surgeon Superintendent at Rawene Hospital for which he was paid £300 a year. He trained Scott to act as his anaesthetist. Some years later Scott's qualifications and role as an anaesthetist were questioned but the local Hospital Board determined she was "qualified" by virtue of her experience.

By 1921 Barbara McCall Smith's petition for divorce on the grounds of her husband's adultery and abandonment had reached the Scottish court. A decree was granted 26 February. that same year the Hokianga County Council, which ran the Hospital Board, introduced cost-cutting measures which included terminating Smith and Scott's employment and readvertising Smith's job at £100 a year. The Council's decision may have been related to some Council members both finding Smith troublesome and to the notoriety caused by his personal life. Smith's divorce was widely reported in British and New Zealand newspapers. Some of the community were shocked by the fact that Smith and Scott were unmarried when they arrived in Rawene. They married in March 1921 shortly after the divorce was granted. Subsequently, the community rallied in support of Smith, presenting a 750 signature petition to the Board, and he was reappointed at his original salary.

=== Rawene Hospital and Hokianga Special Area ===
The Health Department required all hospitals to have special isolation beds for infectious diseases cases, in particular tuberculosis (TB). Smith raised money from the community and in 1915 he closed in the hospital verandah and increased the number of hospital beds, even though he had no intention of treating infectious diseases patients in his hospital. By the following year it was clear that the hospital resources were inadequate and in 1920, although some facilities had been improved, he began lobbying for a better water supply. After the divorce matter and local body elections Smith set about planning a new hospital. In 1925 the Health Department approved the plans for a new hospital and Smith raised money from the community to furnish and equip it. To raise funds he implemented an unofficial 'hut tax' over every dwelling in the county, ran an illegal casino in Rawene and an illegal raffle. The new hospital was built on time and within budget and was opened by the Minister of Health in March 1928.

In the 1930s Smith was advocating for state funded medical care. The election of the Labour government in 1935 with its policy of a state medical service was an opportunity for Smith to promote his views. He saw that doctors had financial objectives, many patients were unable to pay for treatment and that a solution was for all doctors to be on salaries. He outlined his views in his first book Notes from a backblock hospital in 1938.

In 1939 Smith lobbied the government for the Hokianga to be given a special area status. Under this scheme all doctors, in the hospital and community, would be paid salaries by the Hospital Board. Consultations, pharmaceuticals, investigations and hospital admissions would be free. Hospital and domiciliary services would be combined, nurses would be employed by the Health Department, and clinics established in the various districts. After delays, partly due to the war, opposition from the medical profession and protracted negotiations with the government, the Hokianga Special Area was set up in September 1941.

=== Medical practice ===
In the early 1930s Smith began to practice twilight sleep for women in childbirth using Nembutal and hyoscine (Scopolamine). A government Commission of Inquiry into Maternity Services in 1937 included an investigation of anaesthetic practices. The Commission examined Smith's practice, noting Smith had made a special study of painless childbirth, and found his results could not be bettered. The Commission recorded 108 maternity cases at Rawene in the year (including 36 Māori), but only seven maternity beds. Most Māori women gave birth at home and the hospital was unable to cater for more women wanting to give birth there. The Commission recommended an increase in maternity beds, staff and equipment to cater for more Māori cases. In 1948 a newspaper reported that women were flocking to Rawene Hospital to give birth because it offered painless childbirth.

Smith practised some unconventional cures: using cod liver oil and vaseline on dressings to give a non-stick covering, wrapping simple fractures in newspaper casts which could be easily removed, inventing a 'black box' which was placed over the head of anaesthetised patients to raise CO_{2}, refuting the need to eat green vegetables, rejection of circumcision, and encouraging schools to serve sheep-head broth to the children. During World War II, with the threat of a Japanese invasion, Smith stockpiled medical supplies, seriously depleting the nation's supplies.

During the 1918 flu epidemic Smith ordered the police to prevent visitors from entering the area, in an attempt to stop the spread of the disease. In 1933 an epidemic of a febrile illness broke out in Rawene and Smith ordered all shops and schools to be closed, assisted by the police. The Medical Officer of Health for Northland was unwilling to set in place similar restrictions in nearby Kaikohe. However, in order to prevent the spread of the disease Smith succeeded in stopping a visit of the spiritual leader Ratana and his followers. Smith's management of TB cases was called into question in 1946 when patients died in their own homes, putting other family members at risk. Smith always maintained that treating TB cases in sanatoria was ineffective and that the incidence of TB would be reduced by improving living standards, particularly diet and housing, and using effective drug treatment. In 1948 during the polio epidemic Smith demanded that the Northland Medical Officer of Health, James Newman, use his authority to close schools and shops to prevent the disease from spreading. Newman refused on the grounds that widespread closure of schools was not effective in dealing with the epidemic, and school teachers and shopkeepers also refused to take orders from Smith.

In 1948 following a committee of inquiry into the death of a child in his care, Smith and Lucy resigned even though the committee's report cleared Smith of wrongdoing. They moved to Waikanae, near their daughter Janet, where Smith set up in private practice.

=== Other activities ===
Smith and Lucy purchased land for a farm near Horeke in 1920. He organised, and was chair of, a local branch of the Farmer's Union. The farming venture was unsuccessful and the land was later leased and then sold to the government. He recognised the need for local people to have an income and promoted growing tobacco as a cash crop, however the scheme was a failure.

Smith was a convert to Social Credit policies and began a Hokianga party branch, later becoming president of New Zealand Social Credit. He advocated for a special currency as a solution to unemployment.

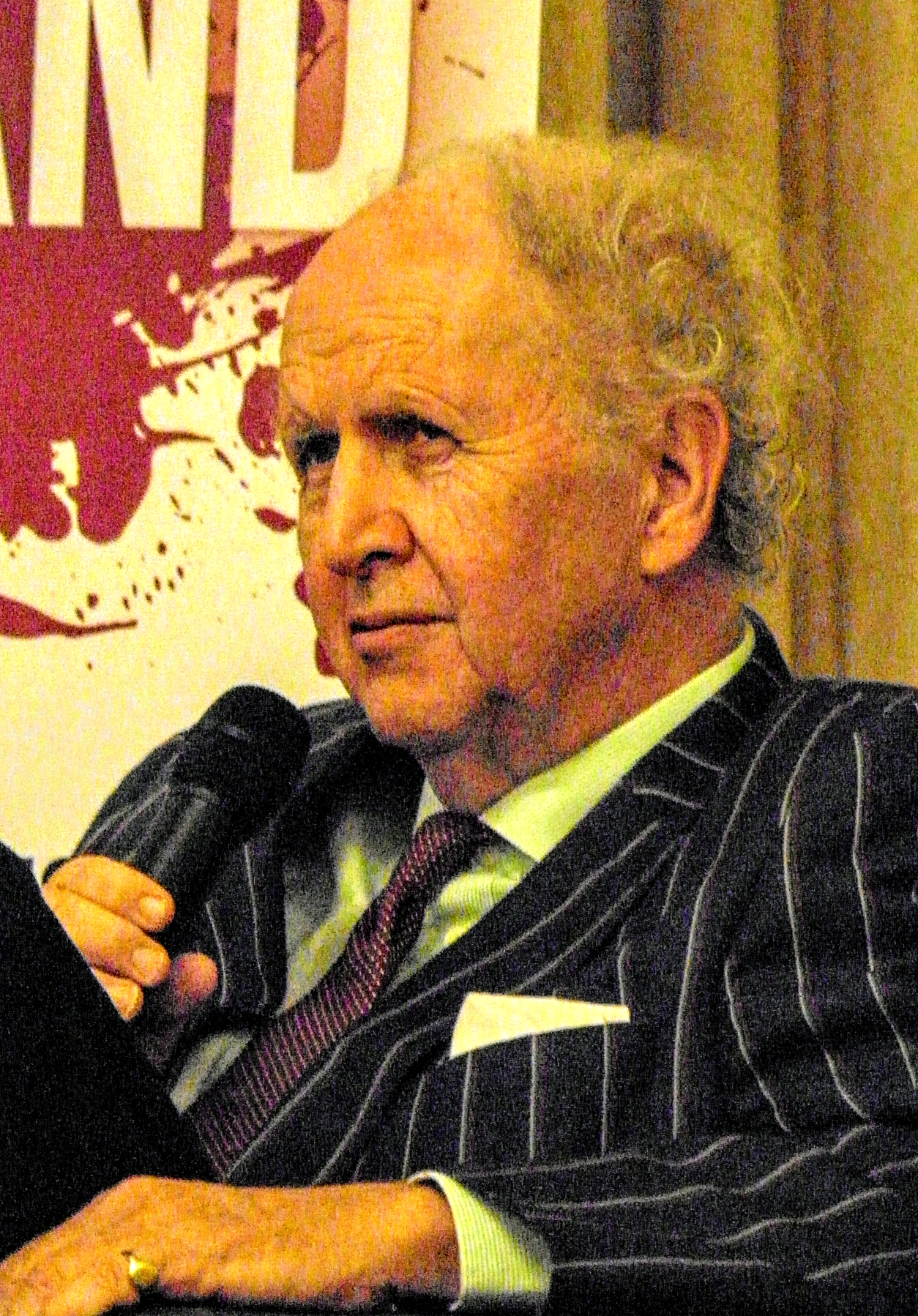
Alexander McCall Smith, George McCall Smith's grandson, 2018

== Personal life ==
George Smith was twice married. With his first wife, Barbara Grieve, whom he married in Tranent in 1907 he had four children. In 1914 Smith left for New Zealand with one of his patients, Lucy Margaret Scott, whom he married in New Zealand in 1921 after divorcing Grieve. They had two children, Jock and Janet. Jock died in 1932. Janet completed five years at Otago Medical School in Dunedin but left to get married, much to her father's displeasure. He did not attend her wedding to Peter Irwin, an Air Force officer, and she was given away by Douglas Robb. She later completed her medical degree in 1963 and practised in New Zealand and Australia in the area of child, student and women's health. She was a health and social activist and died in 2009.

The law professor and writer, Alexander McCall Smith, Smith's grandson by his first marriage to Barbara Grieve, visited Rawene Hospital in 2014.

== Legacy ==
A memorial sundial to Smith was unveiled by Douglas Robb in 1961. The inscription read "Tribute to the memory of George McCall Smith "The Doctor" in this district and medical superintendent from 1914 to 1948. Was also a farmer, town councillor and by his strength of personality became part of our way of life. No call was too far. No track too rough. He served us well. He designed the Rawene Hospital and set up the Hokianga Co-operative Medical Service of doctors, nurses and people - his true memorial."

In his 2004 James Newman Lecture W.F. Parkes opined:

George McCall Smith began ahead of his time yet ended up overtaken by new developments. Eventually he paid the price of professional isolation. His single-mindedness gave him the strength to succeed, yet in the end ironically, it contributed to his eventual loss of self-confidence and consequent resignation.

Smith was not only a doctor but also a campaigner. He promoted the need for adequate income, diet and housing, and campaigned for a health service which was free at the point of need. He was responsible for creating a co-operative medical service and the Hokianga Special Area integrating medical and nursing services as well as hospital and community services, laying the foundation for the health service in the Hokianga.

== Publications ==
- The education of the Maori: (report of a lecture given at Kaikohe to the Native School Teachers' Association) (1921)
- Notes from a backblock hospital (1938)
- Nurses in a co-operative clinic medical service / address delivered by G.M. Smith before the Bay of Islands Branch of the Registered Nurses Association (1938?)
- More notes from a backblock hospital (1941)
- End of the era of murder medicine (1941)
- Medical advice from a backblock hospital (1942)
- Maori rehabilitation / an address given by G.M. Smith before a meeting of the members of the Native Schools Branch, N.Z.E.I., at Kaikohe, October 2, 1943 (1943)
- Plans, plots and appraisals from the backblocks (1945)
- Later notes from a backblocks hospital (1949)
