= Qiu Xinru =

- Born: c. 1804
- Died: c. 1874 (aged 69–70)
- Occupation: Writer
- Parent(s): Qiu Guangyi

Qiu Xinru (Chinese: 丘心如; c. 1804 – c. 1874) was a Qing Dynasty writer, author of one of the three most famous tanci, Bishenghua (Flowers from the Writing Brush 筆生花).

Qiu Xinru was a native of Meili, Huaiyin prefecture, Jiangsu Province, one of four children of Qiu Guangyi (邱廣業, 1771-1834), a Confucian scholar and school instructor, and Qin Shi (秦氏). Her brothers Qiu Huan (1800-1865) and Qiu Yi (1810-1828) and her father were all poets. Her father published the poetry collection Selected Poems of the Cloud Approaching Lodge (Linyunju shicao, 臨雲居詩 草).

Qiu Xinru married into the Zhang family. She had two daughters, one of whom died of smallpox, and a son. Her autobiographical writings are peppered with complaints about the poor treatment she received by the Zhang family, as well as her low opinion of the learning and abilities of her husband and son. Following the deaths of her parents-in-law and the marriage of her surviving daughter, she returned to her birth family. Poverty forced her to become a schoolteacher.

Qiu Xinru began Bishenghua before her marriage and spent over three decades writing it before it was finally published in 1857. The earliest surviving copy, in the Shanghai Normal University Library, dates from 1879. It is a very long work, made up of four juan (books) and thirty-two hui (chapters), for a total of 960,000 characters.

Set in the Zhengde period of the Ming Dynasty, the title of Bishenghua references a legend about the celebrated Chinese poet Li Bai, that when he was young he dreamed that flowers sprang from the tip of his writing brush. Qiu Xinru employs it in reference to the birth of her protagonist. A goddess with a writing brush tells her mother Mo Shi in a dream that she will be born as her daughter, Jiang Dehua (姜德華). The daughter of a high-ranking official, Jiang Jinren, she grows up to be a well-educated and virtuous woman, engaged to the son of another official, Wen Shaoxia. The villainous and well-connected Chu Yuanfang wants his own daughter to marry Wen Shaoxia, so he conspires to have Jiang Dehua captured and sent to the imperial palace to be a royal maiden. She plans to hang herself to preserve her virtue when the helpful fox spirit Hu Yuexian helps her escape disguised as a man, Jiang Junbi.

Jiang Junbi succeeds so well at the imperial examinations that she is appointed prime minister. She marries a woman, Xie Yunxian, but their marriage is not consummated because her bride is a devout and abstinent Daoist. Meanwhile, her former fiance Wen Shaoxia marries a different woman, Murong Chunniang, who is then kidnapped and becomes the concubine of Jiang Junbi. Murong Chunniang gives birth to Wen Shaoxia's son, Xialang, who is raised as Jiang Junbi's child. Wen Shaoxia succeeds in becoming an imperial official and meets Jiang Junbi. Realizing she is Jiang Dehua, he contrives to have her identity revealed. The Zhengde Emperor rewards Jiang Dehua with the title Marquis of Heroism and Chastity and she retreats to married life with Wen Shaoxia while he becomes prime minister. The second half of the book covers their domestic life, with the raising of children, fulfilling of family obligations, and charity work. Jiang Dehua and Wen Shaoxia retire and eventually become immortals.

Bishenghua is modeled after an earlier and similarly-plotted tanci, Zaishengyuan ("Lovers through Time") by Chen Duansheng. Bishenghua, however, critiques Zaishengyuan through a conservative Confucian perspective, with Qiu Xinru denouncing the protagonist of Zaishengyuan, Meng Lijun, for her supposed unfilial conduct.

Tanci traditionally included self-referential rhymes at the start and/or end of each chapter, but Qiu Xinru expanded this with lengthy autobiographical passages at the beginning and end of her chapters. This is the main source of information for her life and makes her a rare autobiographical voice amongst Chinese women of the time.
