= Bertie Pollock =

Bertie Pollock is a character in The World According to Bertie and other novels in the 44 Scotland Street series by Alexander McCall Smith. Bertie, "an endearing 7-year-old boy," has been described as the "most beloved character" in McCall Smith's novels.

Bertie is "a polite and solemn 7-year-old boy with a devoted and gentle father and a thoroughly nasty mother" in a series of novels in which Smith satirizes the conceits of feminism embodied by Bertie's mother, one of the "breed of feminists who despise men," according to reviewer Muriel Dobson. In Bertie's Guide to Life and Mothers (2013) 7-year-old Bertie wants a penknife for his birthday, but his militantly feminist mother gives him a gender-neutral doll, which the well-bred Bertie must pretend to like. Irene "insists on imposing her worldview on everyone with whom she comes in contact, but most especially on poor Bertie, who simply wants to play with other boys, join the Boy Scouts, go camping and fishing, and someday perhaps get a Swiss Army knife."

Irene, obsessed with the progressive psychology of Melanie Klein, began what she calls “the Bertie Project:”

"For her, the Bertie Project was based on the notion of the malleability of masculine character. She wanted Bertie to be free of the stereotypes of gender. She wanted him to be in touch with his inner girl. She wanted him to view Swiss Army penknifes as instruments of oppression…. The possession of a Swiss Army penknife was a statement proclaiming, I am a boy. Irene saw all that quite clearly, and she would not allow it. It was as simple as that." In The Bertie Project, Irene has just returned home from a lengthy stay in the Middle East where she ran a book club in a Bedouin harem, causing her to redouble her commitment to making "drastic" reforms in the lives and characters of her husband and son.

American political commentator Charlie Sykes describes Bertie as "a precocious six-year-old of distinctive sweetness, thoughtfulness, honesty, and kindness, whose longing for a normal boyhood is more poignant than threatening. All of which makes him the unlikeliest of protagonists in our ongoing gender war."

Bethanne Patrick of The Washington Post, who describes Bertie's mother as "a miserable shrew," enjoys the fact that as Smith's characters "walk, talk, cook, study and meet, they consider all sorts of philosophical conundrums, from how best to raise a child to what constitutes hipster clothing. Some dilemmas are solved, others get more complicated — just like life."

Later books add more depth and (occasionally) a more sympathetic view of Irene and her drivers.

The "44 Scotland Street" books began as a weekly series in The Scotsman, where Bertie's mother, Irene Pollock (37), is described by Smith as "the guiding spirit of at least three book clubs (including a Melanie Klein reading group), and a graduate of the University of Edinburgh in social theory and politics."

Smith has said that he is surprised that Bertie has “become so important a character.” “I certainly did not imagine that he would acquire so many supporters—or sympathizers.” Wherever he goes, he has found that “people are more anxious about Bertie than they are about any of my other fictional characters. They want him to find freedom. They want him to escape.”

== As a critique of feminism ==
Charles J. Sykes understands Bertie as "portray(ing) Bertie’s struggle to free himself from his insufferable mother and her programme of aggressive gender neutrality. Smith offers up a stinging takedown not merely of a style of parental hothousing, but of psychotherapy, feminism, the attack on masculinity, and social-justice hectoring."
