= Gu Taiqing =

- 顧太清
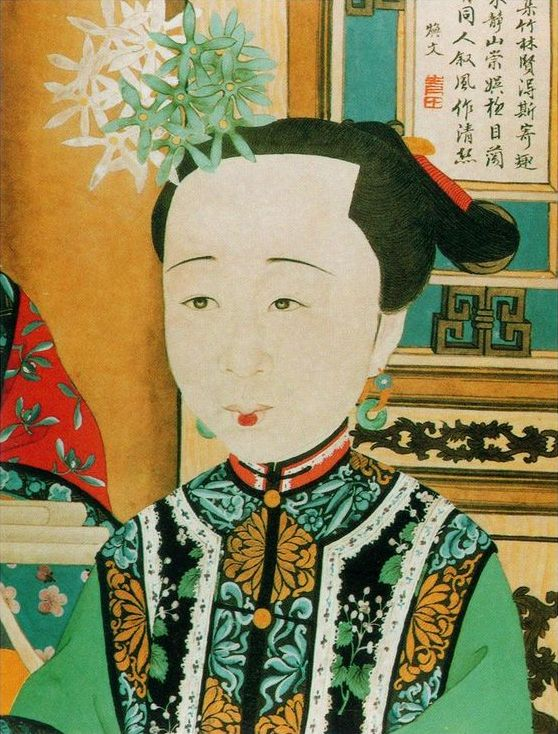
- Born: 1799
- Died: 1877 (aged 77–78)
- Occupations: Writer, poet
- Relatives: Great uncle: Ortai

Gu Taiqing (Chinese: 顧太清; pinyin: Gù Tàiqīng; 1799 – c. 1877) was one of the top-ranked women poets of the Qing Dynasty. She is especially known for her ci poetry and for her sequel to the novel Honglou meng (Dream of the Red Chamber). This 1877 novel is the earliest extant Chinese novel written by a woman. One scholar estimates that there are as many as 1,163 surviving poems written by Gu.

== Life ==
She was descended from a Manchu family from the Sirin Gioro clan. There had been some debate as to whether or not she was of Manchu descent. It had been claimed that she was born into a banner family named Gu and took on a Manchu identity after her marriage to Aisin-Gioro Yihui 奕会 (1799-1838), a Manchu prince. Other scholars claim that the confusion about her identity is an attempt to obscure her family's descent from E-er-tai, a Manchu grand secretary disgraced (and forced to commit suicide) during one of Qianlong's literary inquisitions.

Her marriage to Yihui seems to have been a happy one, despite the fact that she had the status of concubine rather than primary princess consort (Yihui's princess consort was Lady Hešeri). She had five children—three sons and two daughters. Yihui also had children with his primary wife, who died early. Gu's life was thrown into turmoil when her husband died in 1838. Yihui's family forced her and her children out of their Beijing home. The reasons for their hostility are unclear, but a rumored affair between Gu Taiqing and Gong Zichen may have been part of the story. During this period of poverty she may have sustained her family by selling jewelry and artwork.

After the death of her husband, Gu's circle of female friends, including the Xu sisters Yunlin and Yunjiang and Shen Shanbao, who was her sworn sister, became even more important to her, both emotionally and as a source of creative inspiration.

== Work ==
Gu Taiqing was the author of a sequel to Honglou meng (Dream of the Red Chamber), entitled Honglou meng ying (紅樓夢影 Dream Shadows of the Red Chamber).

Gu Taiqing's poems exist in a number of modern editions. Translations of individual poems have been made by Ellen Widmer; David McCraw, Grace S. Fong and Irving Yucheng Lo; Yanning Wang; and Wilt Idema and Beata Grant.
