= Liang Desheng =

Chinese poet and writer

Liang Desheng (traditional Chinese: 梁德繩; simplified Chinese: 梁德绳; pinyin: Liáng Déshéng; 1771–1847) was a Chinese poet and writer active during the Qing Dynasty. She was the wife of Xu Zongyan, a prominent intellectual from Hangzhou. Since her sister died young, Liang Desheng acted as a surrogate mother for her niece Wang Duan, who would become an editor. Both of them were also friends with another female poet, Gu Taiqing.

Liang Desheng wrote the final three volumes of the tan-ci Zai sheng Yuan. The first seventeen volumes had been written by Chen Duansheng, but she had died before she could complete the work. There were more women who tried their hand at writing a conclusion to the book, but hers was considered superior. It is now regularly printed together with the first seventeen volumes.

It was first published in 1821 and deals with the affairs of three families in the Yunnan province, during the early Qing Dynasty.

She also published a collection of poetry, Guchunxian ji (Poems from Ancient-Springtime Studio).

Translations of her poems are available in several collections. See the translation by Nancy Hodes and Tung Yuan-fang,
