= Officialdom Unmasked =

Chinese novel by Li Baojia

Cover of a 1934 edition of the novel Officialdom Unmasked, collection of the Fudan University

A 1936 printed edition

Officialdom Unmasked (simplified Chinese: 官场现形记; traditional Chinese: 官場現形記; pinyin: Guānchǎng Xiànxíng Jì; Wade–Giles: Kuan-ch'ang hsien-hsing chi), also translated into English in some sources as The Bureaucrats, is a late-Qing Chinese novel by Li Baojia (Li Boyuan). The theme of the work is the disintegration of the late Qing dynasty civil service bureaucracy as it is deteriorating. The novel was translated to English in 2002 in an abridged format by T. L. Yang and published by Hong Kong University Press.

Donald Holoch, author of "A Novel of Setting: The Bureaucrats", wrote that the novel is very long with a "bewildering" amount of content, and therefore he argues that discussing the novel is difficult. Officialdom Unmasked has over 600,000 Chinese characters. It has over 800 dramatis personæ and many episodes. Holoch wrote that the work "integrates the decline of the state, the status of women, the bureaucratic personality, the role of imperialism, and the commercialization of human relations."

== Title ==
The title can be translated literally as Official circles: a revelation., or variously as "A Revelation of Official Circles", "The Bureaucrats: A Revelation", or "Observations on the Current State of Officialdom", "The Bureaucracy Exposed," "The Exposure of the Official World", or "Official Circles: A Revelation".

== Development ==
Jaroslav Průšek wrote that Li Baojia wrote Officialdom Unmasked because Li Baojia wanted to entice people into opposing a corrupt bureaucracy.

Li Baojia wrote the book from 1901 to 1906 while simultaneously writing other books. The first half of the work appeared in installments of Shanghai Shijie Fanhua Bao, serialized there from April 1903 to June 1905. Donald Holoch, author of "A Novel of Setting: The Bureaucrats", wrote that Officialdom Unmasked was Li Baojia's "magnum opus". Li died in 1906.

Since the year of Li Baojia's death, the current version of Officialdom Unmasked is a 60 chapter version. Holoch wrote that a man named Ouyang Juyuan (T: 歐陽巨源, S: 欧阳巨源, P: Ōuyáng Jùyuán, W: Ou-yang Chü-yüan), a friend of Li Baojia, "allegedly" added the final 12 chapters after Li Baojia died, and therefore the 60 chapter version is "commonly held to be the work of two men." Holoch argued that Li Baojia and Ouyang Juyuan shared the same conception of the work over a period of several years.

== Structure ==
Holoch stated that the book has action episodes, where a goal is conceived and the protagonist or someone on his behalf begins an action to a successful or non-successful conclusion, and non-action episodes. Holoch defines the beginning of a new action episode as whenever a new goal appears or when a new protagonist appears. According to Holoch, each episode may vary from 1 page to 30 pages and they are not distinctly marked off like a chapter would. He defines a non-action episode as one without character movement or no action. The episode instead illustrates the setting. According to Holoch the work has 61 action episodes.

== Characters ==
The novel has over 800 dramatis personæ. Within the action episodes, there are four types of protagonists present: civil officials/bureaucrats, people aspiring to become officials, people who are motivated by making money, and women. The bureaucrats include civil officials of all ranks, including army officers, clerks and aides, the warden, up to the governor. The aspirants wanting to become officials include one examination candidate, sons of officials, former petty bureaucrats, wealthy men, and the sons of wealthy men. The female characters are dependents of male characters, wives, concubines, and/or are negatively affected by male characters.

- Qu Nai'an (T: 瞿耐菴, S: 瞿耐庵, P: Qú Nài'ān, W: Ch'ü Nai-an) - A Man in his late forties who is married to a woman in the same age group. They do not have children, and Qu Nai'an decides to take a mistress.
- Qu Nai'an's wife (C: 瞿太太, P: Qú-tàitai, W: Ch'ü tai-tai)

== Reception ==
Donald Holoch wrote in the essay "A Novel of Setting: The Bureaucrats", published in The Chinese Novel at the Turn of the Century, that Officialdom Unmasked is "A masterpiece of satirical writing so inexhaustibly inventive in terms of incident that it bears comparison with the plotting in any great Chinese novel." Holoch argued that the work "is an impressively coherent materialist critique, a serious interpretation of history; for its ideological power and its artistic achievement it deserves to be known in the West." Bruce Doar, author of a book review of The Chinese Novel at the Turn of the Century, wrote that "Holoch's enthusiasm" for the work was "infectious".

Holoch believes that the novel manipulates characterization and the plot to emphasize the Chinese society's mercantile orientation and that the setting unifies the novel. Holoch argues it is "an impressively coherent materialistic critique, a serious interpretation of history". Holoch's paper analyzes the work in terms of "cycles", a group of four to nine thematic units. According to Holoch's analysis, each thematic unit, which serves as an episode in the story, illustrates a particular aspect of the social setting and is centered around a set of localities or a group of characters. Robert E. Hegel, author of a book review of The Chinese Novel at the Turn of the Century, wrote that Holoch "takes pains to show cause for his praise" even though the novel had been written by two men who had a single conception over a period of several years.

== Release ==
The University of Chicago Press distributes the T.L. Yang translation in the United States.
