= Chen Duansheng =

Chinese novelist and poet (1732–1779)

Chen Duansheng (1751-1796) was a Chinese poet and tanci novelist. She is the author of one of the most famous tanci, Zaishengyuan ("Lovers through Time").

== Biography ==
Chen Duansheng was born in Hangzhou, Zhejiang, China. Both her father Chen Yudun and her uncle Chen Yuwan were scholar-officials. Chen Duansheng's grandfather supported education for Chen Duansheng and her two sisters. At age 23 Chen Duansheng married Fan Tan, and they had a daughter and a son. Fan Tan was later exiled for allegedly asking a substitute to take the imperial examination for him. She died in 1796.

== Writing ==
Chen Duansheng began writing at the age of 17. Because her grandfather did not respect the tanci genre, she had to write in secret. Chen Duansheng wrote 16 volumes with four chapters each of her magnum opus Zai sheng Yuan by 1770. After her mother died, Chen Duansheng did not write again until 1784 when she completed one more four chapter volume. After her death, Liang Desheng picked up the work and completed three more volumes of Zai sheng Yuan, resulting in a twenty volume work.

== Sources ==
- Sung, Marina H. The Narrative Art of Tsai-sheng-yüan: A Feminist Vision in Traditional Confucian Society. San Francisco: Chinese Materials Center Publications, 1994.
- Wu, Qingyun. Female Rule in Chinese and English Literary Utopias. Syracuse, N.Y.: Syracuse University Press, 1995. Chapter 3 analyzes Zaisheng yuan and compares it with Lady Florence Dixie's Gloriana; or, The Revolution of 1900.
