= Rawene =

Place in Northland, New Zealand

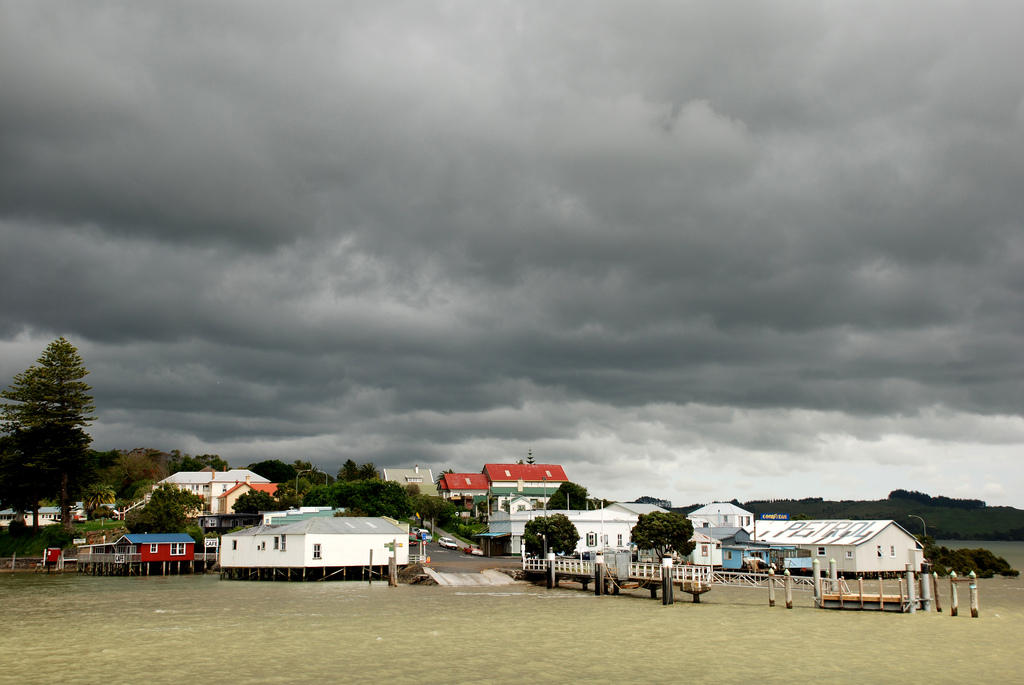
- Rawene, as viewed from the water
- Interactive map of Rawene
- Coordinates: 35°23′46″S 173°30′18″E
- Country: New Zealand
- Region: Northland Region
- District: Far North District
- Ward: Kaikohe/Hokianga
- Community: Kaikohe-Hokianga
- Subdivision: South Hokianga
- Electorates: Northland; Te Tai Tokerau

Government
  - Territorial Authority: Far North District Council
  - Regional council: Northland Regional Council
  - Northland MP: Grant McCallum
  - Te Tai Tokerau MP: TBD

Area
  - Total: 2.15 km^{2} (0.83 sq mi)

Population (June 2025)
  - Total: 470
  - Density: 220/km^{2} (570/sq mi)

Rawene is a town on the south side of the Hokianga harbour, in Northland, New Zealand. State Highway 12 passes to the south. The town lies at the apex of a peninsula. A car ferry links it to Kohukohu and the northern Hokianga.

== History ==
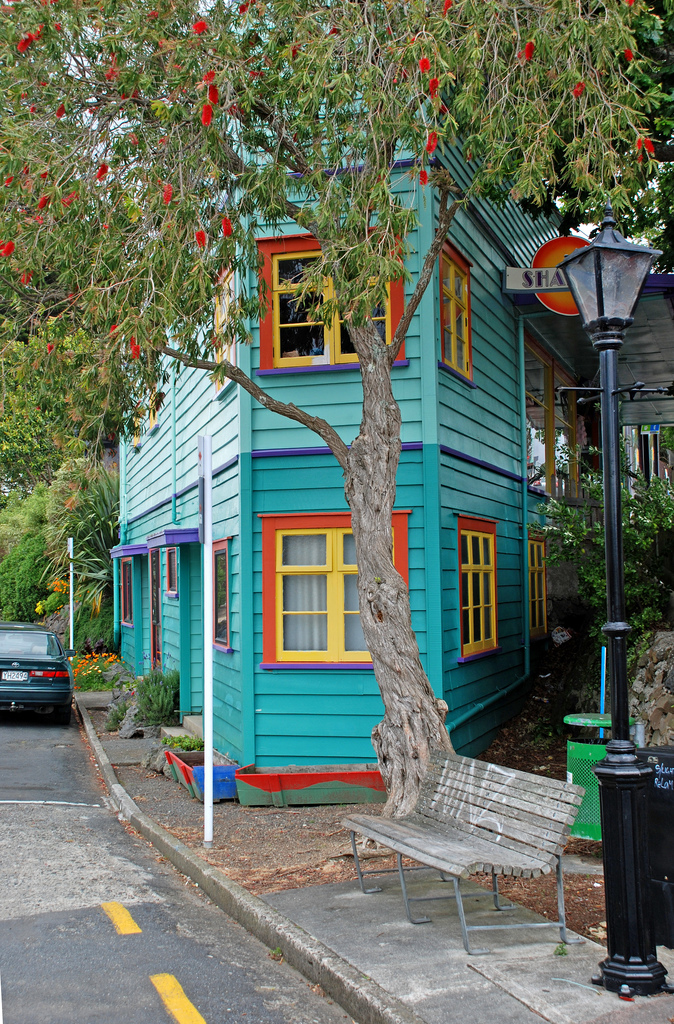
This strange shaped building was originally a joinery factory making doors, windows and coffins.

Rawene started as a timber centre, with a mill and shipyards established in the early 19th century. An attempted settlement by the first New Zealand Company in 1826 failed. Captain James Herd in 1822 had taken out the first shipment of kauri from the Hokianga in his ship Providence. In 1825 he returned as an agent for the Company, sailing the Rosanna in company with the Lambton, and 60 settlers between the two vessels. Starting at Stewart Island / Rakiura, Herd sailed up the east coast eventually rounding North Cape to enter Hokianga - his old stamping ground. Herd negotiated to buy a vast tract of land. The deal was contested but for decades Europeans referred to the town as "Herd's Point". Later it was called "Hokianga Township", and in 1884 it became "Rawene", possibly to identify the post office and telegraph.

The post office had started operating by 1845 - one of eight in the country.

Aperahama Taonui, chief of Te Popoto hapū, allegedly operated a school at Rawene in the mid-19th century.

James Reddy Clendon, previously the United States Consul to New Zealand, settled in Rawene in 1862 and served as the local magistrate under the Native Circuit Courts Act until 1867. His residence, Clendon House, has been preserved by Heritage New Zealand and is open to the public.

By 1872 Rawene had two stores and two hotels. The Wharf Hotel, which ran from the 1860s or '70s until ca 1894 became Rawene's first hotel and is now a Category 2 historic place. There was a Wesleyan church, and the Roman Catholics owned a section. Von Sturmer was the Postmaster, Customs Officer and Magistrate.

During the Dog Tax War of 1898 the residents of Rawene left for Kohukohu or took refuge on a steamer after the tax rebels threatened to march on the town. On 5 May 1898 120 men marched from Rawene to Waima to deal with the "rebels", but the dispute was settled without them.

=== Health services ===
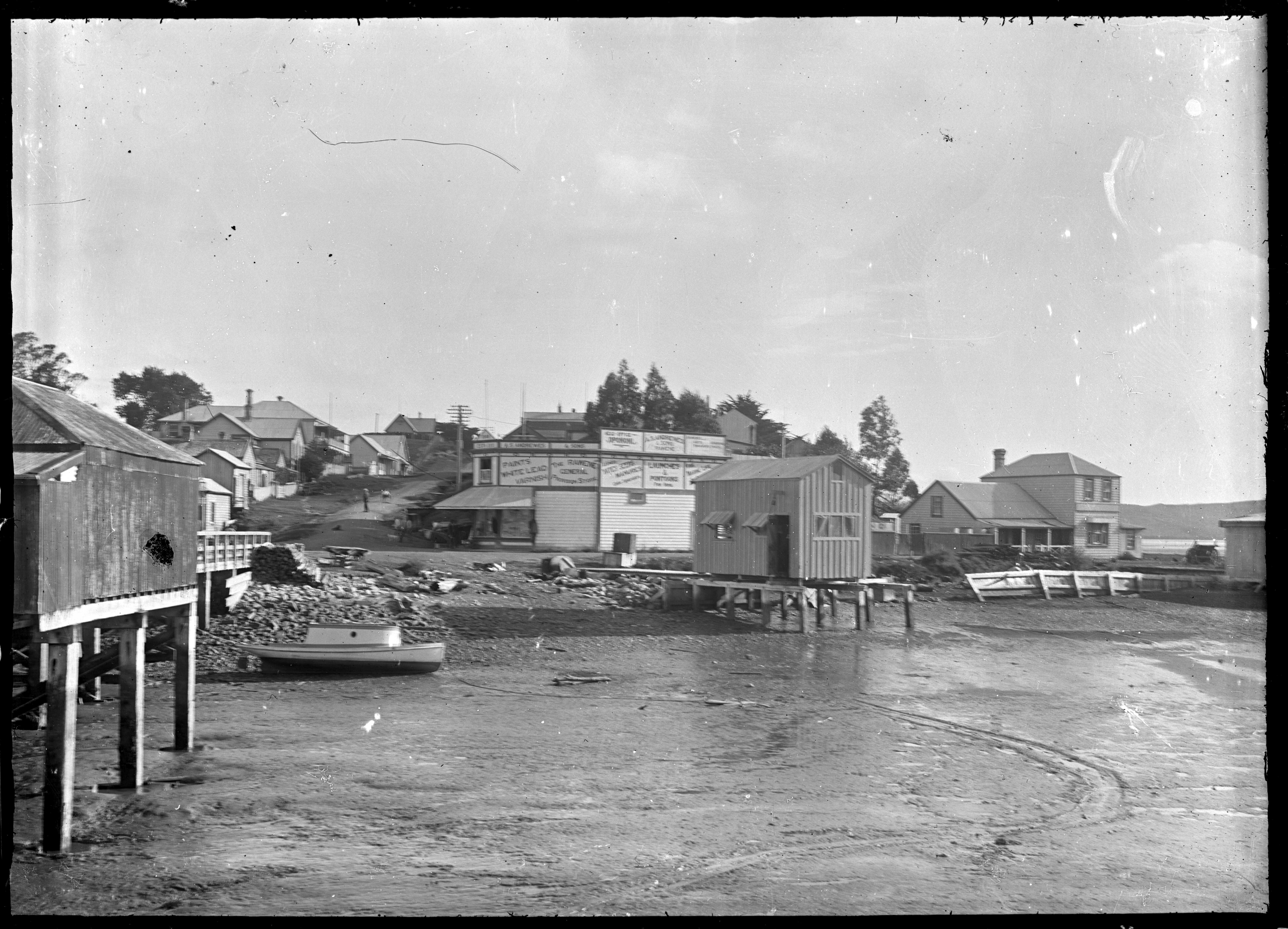
View of Rawene in 1918

The former Wharf Hotel was converted into a hospital with 12 beds and opened in 1904. In 1909 the hospital moved to a new site. Dr George McCall Smith, who headed the hospital from 1914 to 1948, oversaw the expansion of the hospital with more beds, an operating theatre and x-ray room and fundraised for new hospital which opened in 1928. Chilwell and Trevithick, an Auckland architectural firm did the plans based on Smith's ideas and Smith was clerk of works for the construction.

Smith developed a unique health-system for the Hokianga. He became a practitioner of "painless childbirth" in the early 1930s, using premedication with the barbiturate Nembutal combined with Hyoscine. This proved very popular and attracted women to Rawene from far afield. The annual average of thirty births per year now peaked at two hundred. In 1937 a "Commission of Inquiry into Maternity Services" investigated Smith's practice. Smith fronted up with case notes on his last two hundred patients, and his results could not be bettered anywhere.

Parliament declared a special health area in the 1940s. This meant that all medical officers in the Hokianga were salaried, and all consultations, pharmaceuticals, investigations and hospital admissions were free. The whole scheme was funded through a per-capita grant.

== Demographics ==
Statistics New Zealand describes Rawene as a rural settlement. It covers 2.15 km^{2} (0.83 sq mi) and had an estimated population of 470 as of June 2025, with a population density of 219 people per km^{2}. The settlement is part of the larger Hokianga South statistical area.

Historical population for Rawene
Year	Pop.	±% p.a.
2006	441	—
2013	471	+0.94%
2018	495	+1.00%
2023	474	−0.86%

Rāwene had a population of 474 in the 2023 New Zealand census, a decrease of 21 people (−4.2%) since the 2018 census, and an increase of 3 people (0.6%) since the 2013 census. There were 237 males and 237 females in 207 dwellings. 2.5% of people identified as LGBTIQ+. The median age was 55.4 years (compared with 38.1 years nationally). There were 72 people (15.2%) aged under 15 years, 57 (12.0%) aged 15 to 29, 177 (37.3%) aged 30 to 64, and 168 (35.4%) aged 65 or older.

People could identify as more than one ethnicity. The results were 55.7% European (Pākehā); 61.4% Māori; 8.2% Pasifika; 2.5% Asian; 0.6% Middle Eastern, Latin American and African New Zealanders (MELAA); and 1.3% other, which includes people giving their ethnicity as "New Zealander". English was spoken by 96.2%, Māori language by 24.7%, Samoan by 1.3% and other languages by 7.0%. No language could be spoken by 2.5% (e.g. too young to talk). New Zealand Sign Language was known by 1.3%. The percentage of people born overseas was 15.2, compared with 28.8% nationally.

Religious affiliations were 39.2% Christian, 4.4% Māori religious beliefs, and 1.9% New Age. People who answered that they had no religion were 46.2%, and 7.6% of people did not answer the census question.

Of those at least 15 years old, 54 (13.4%) people had a bachelor's or higher degree, 201 (50.0%) had a post-high school certificate or diploma, and 126 (31.3%) people exclusively held high school qualifications. The median income was $25,100, compared with $41,500 nationally. 18 people (4.5%) earned over $100,000 compared to 12.1% nationally. The employment status of those at least 15 was that 99 (24.6%) people were employed full-time, 66 (16.4%) were part-time, and 18 (4.5%) were unemployed.

=== Hokianga South statistical area ===
The statistical area of Hokianga South, which also includes Whirinaki, covers 126.04 km^{2} (48.66 sq mi) and had an estimated population of 1,370 as of June 2025, with a population density of 10.9 people per km^{2}.

Historical population for Hokianga South
Year	Pop.	±% p.a.
2006	1,065	—
2013	1,239	+2.19%
2018	1,236	−0.05%
2023	1,359	+1.92%

Hokianga South had a population of 1,359 in the 2023 New Zealand census, an increase of 123 people (10.0%) since the 2018 census, and an increase of 120 people (9.7%) since the 2013 census. There were 669 males and 693 females in 480 dwellings. 2.6% of people identified as LGBTIQ+. The median age was 49.4 years (compared with 38.1 years nationally). There were 261 people (19.2%) aged under 15 years, 180 (13.2%) aged 15 to 29, 567 (41.7%) aged 30 to 64, and 345 (25.4%) aged 65 or older.

People could identify as more than one ethnicity. The results were 55.4% European (Pākehā); 62.3% Māori; 6.2% Pasifika; 1.8% Asian; 0.7% Middle Eastern, Latin American and African New Zealanders (MELAA); and 2.2% other, which includes people giving their ethnicity as "New Zealander". English was spoken by 95.6%, Māori language by 27.4%, Samoan by 0.7% and other languages by 4.9%. No language could be spoken by 2.9% (e.g. too young to talk). New Zealand Sign Language was known by 0.9%. The percentage of people born overseas was 10.6, compared with 28.8% nationally.

Religious affiliations were 38.9% Christian, 4.4% Māori religious beliefs, 0.2% Buddhist, 1.1% New Age, and 1.3% other religions. People who answered that they had no religion were 48.8%, and 5.7% of people did not answer the census question.

Of those at least 15 years old, 150 (13.7%) people had a bachelor's or higher degree, 573 (52.2%) had a post-high school certificate or diploma, and 327 (29.8%) people exclusively held high school qualifications. The median income was $24,900, compared with $41,500 nationally. 39 people (3.6%) earned over $100,000 compared to 12.1% nationally. The employment status of those at least 15 was that 342 (31.1%) people were employed full-time, 198 (18.0%) were part-time, and 57 (5.2%) were unemployed.

== Education ==
Rawene School is a coeducational full primary (years 1-8) school has a roll of 67 students as of July 2026.

A room for secondary students was added to Rawene Primary School in 1922. In 1947 a stand-alone Rawene District High School was built. It was extended in 1952, but was destroyed by fire in 1972.

The Rawene Learning Centre is a campus of NorthTec polytechnic.

== Notable people ==
- Norm Maxwell, rugby union footballer and All Black.
- Ron Guthrey, mayor of Christchurch (1968 to 1971).
- Gordon Cochrane, WWII RNZAF bomber pilot.
- René Shadbolt, nurse in Spanish Civil War, Hokianga hospital matron
- George McCall Smith, doctor, medical superintendent, community leader
