= Li Baojia =

Chinese author (1867–1906)

- Traditional Chinese: 李寶嘉
- Simplified Chinese: 李宝嘉
Transcriptions
Standard Mandarin
- Hanyu Pinyin: Lǐ Bǎojiā
- Wade–Giles: Li^{3} Pao^{3}-chia^{1}

Li Boyuan
- Chinese: 李伯元
Transcriptions
Standard Mandarin
- Hanyu Pinyin: Lǐ Bóyuán
- Wade–Giles: Li^{3} Po^{2}-yüan^{2}

Nanting tingzhang
- Traditional Chinese: 南亭停長
- Simplified Chinese: 南亭停长
Transcriptions
Standard Mandarin
- Hanyu Pinyin: Nántíng tíngzhǎng
- Wade–Giles: Nan^{2}-t'ing^{2} T'ing^{2}-chang^{3}

Li Baojia (Chinese: 李寶嘉), courtesy name (zi) Li Boyuan (Chinese: 李伯元; 1867-1906), art name nickname (hao) Nanting tingzhang (南亭停長) was a Qing Dynasty-era Chinese author. He was a writer, essayist, ballad author, poet, calligrapher, and seal carver. He edited a fiction periodical and several tabloids.

== History ==
Li Baojia was born in Shandong. His ancestral hometown was Wujin in what is now Changzhou, Jiangsu. Li Baojia lived in Shandong for his early childhood and young adulthood, spanning the years 1867 to 1892. After 1892 he moved to Wujin into the residence of his parents. For a five-year period he studied for the xiucai imperial examination and passed it. He then studied for the juren exam but did not pass. He moved from Wujin to Shanghai at age 30 and worked as a writer and journalist.

Initially Li served as the principal writer and editor of several area tabloids and magazines. They included the Shanghai Shijie Fanhua Bao, the Zhinan Bao (traditional Chinese: 指南報; simplified Chinese: 指南报; pinyin: Zhǐnán Bào; Wade–Giles: Chih^{3}-nan^{2} Pao^{4}; lit. 'The Guide or News About the Pleasure Quarters'), and Youxi Bao (meaning "Amusement News" or "News About Recreation"). By 1903 he became the editor of and a contributor to the Xiuxiang Xiaoshuo (繡像小說; 绣像小说; Xiùxiàng Xiǎoshuō; Hsiu-hsiang Hsiao-shuo; 'Illustrated Fiction or Fiction Illustrated'), a reputable fortnightly publication that was published by the Commercial Press of Shanghai, then the city's largest publisher. The magazine also serialized his novel Wenming Xiaoshi (Modern Times).

Li was among those who designed literary drinking games to cater to the urban leisure aesthetics of the late Qing period.

He died in Shanghai at age 39.

== Writing style ==
The Indiana Companion to Traditional Chinese Literature, Part 1 wrote that in Li Baojia's time, his writings were popular and "suited the social and political climate" of the late Qing Dynasty. Li Baojia wrote novels for an audience who did not receive a classical education, and he used everyday vernacular speech in his works. The Indiana Companion to Traditional Chinese Literature, Part 1 stated that some people characterized his writings as "satirical, vituperative, and exaggerated".

Li Baojia's works are meant to reflect Chinese society. His characters were written to represent social groups so he did not use complex characterization. He patterned each of his novels from an identical plot organized in thematic cycles. He used this plot as a base to systematically describe social strata. Milena Doleželová-Velingerová, author of "Chapter 38: Fiction from the End of the Empire to the Beginning of the Republic (1897-1916)", wrote that "These new inventions in the structural configuration of the novel made Li Pao-chia an unsurpassed master of the late Ch'ing novel while presenting a broad picture of Chinese society."

The Indiana Companion to Traditional Chinese Literature, Part 1 stated that Li Baojia's works were "artistically uneven".

== Purpose of his writing ==
The Indiana Companion to Traditional Chinese Literature, Part 1 argued that Li Baojia's novels "portrayed China in a serious state of disrepair and in need of drastic change" and that his works "served an important political and social function in a critical transitional period." The book further argued that many later readers of Li Baojia's works interpreted them as advocating for radical changes but that Li Baojia himself was a moderate reformer who was against radical change.

== Works ==
Novels:

- Officialdom Unmasked - Li Baojia wrote the book from 1901 to 1906 while simultaneously writing other books. Jaroslav Průšek wrote that Li Baojia wrote Officialdom Unmasked because Li Baojia wanted to entice people into opposing a corrupt bureaucracy. Since the year of Li Baojia's death, the current version of Guanchang Xianxing Ji is a 60 chapter version. Donald Holoch, author of "A Novel of Setting: The Bureaucrats", wrote that a man named Ouyang Juyuan (歐陽巨源; 欧阳巨源; Ōuyáng Jùyuán; Ou-yang Chü-yüan), a friend of Li Baojia, "allegedly" added the final 12 chapters after Li Baojia died, and therefore the 60 chapter version is "commonly held to be the work of two men."
- Wenming Xiaoshi
  - English translation: Li, Boyuan (1996). Modern Times: A Brief History of Enlightenment. Translated by Lancashire, Douglas. Hong Kong: Chinese University Press. ISBN 962-7255-16-5.
- Huo Diyu (活地獄; 活地狱; Huó Dìyù; Huo Ti-yü; 'Living Hell') - It documents judicial and penal system's malpractices. This work was unfinished.

Ballads:

- Gengzi Guobian Tanci - Written immediately after the Boxer Rebellion, it was Li Baojia's first major literary work, serialized in the Shanghai Shijie Fanhua Bao.

Miscellaneous writings

- Nanting Sihua (南亭四話; 南亭四话; Nántíng sìhuà; Nan-t'ing Ssu-hua; 'Four Miscellanies from the Southern Pavilion') - A collection of four miscellaneous writings by Li Baojia

The Indiana Companion to Traditional Chinese Literature, Part 1 stated that "There are also a number of works of doubtful authorship attributed to him."

- Haitian Hongxue Ji (海天鴻雪記; 海天鸿雪记; Hǎitiān Hóngxuě Jì; Hai-tian hung-hsüeh chi; 'Boundless Snow')
- Fanhua Meng (繁華夢; 繁华梦; Fánhuá Mèng; Fan-hua Meng; 'Glittering Dreams')
- Zhongguo Xianzai Ji (中國現在記; 中国现在记; Zhōngguó Xiànzài Jì; Chung-kuo hsien-tsai chi; 'Present-day China')
