= 44 Scotland Street =

2004 novel by Alexander McCall Smith

44 SCOTLAND STREET
- First edition cover
- Author: Alexander McCall Smith
- Language: English
- Genre: Serial novel
- Published: 2004-2005 (The Scotsman) (serial); 2005 (Polygon Books) (book form)
- Publication place: Scotland
- Media type: Print (Hardback & Paperback) & Serial
- Pages: 368 pp (first edition, hardback)
- ISBN: 1-904598-16-1 (first edition, hardback)
- OCLC: 58973332
- Dewey Decimal: 823/.914 22
- LC Class: PR6063.C326 A613 2005b
- Followed by: Espresso Tales

44 Scotland Street is an episodic novel by Alexander McCall Smith, the author of The No. 1 Ladies' Detective Agency. The story was first published as a serial in The Scotsman, starting 26 January 2004, every weekday, for six months. The book retains the 100+ short chapters of the original. It was partially influenced by Armistead Maupin's Tales of the City, a famous serial story. It is the first book in a series of the same name. The series now has 19 books, as of 2026.

== Plot introduction ==
The original novel tells the story of Pat, a student during her second gap year and a source of some worry to her parents, who is accepted as a new tenant at 44 Scotland Street (a real street - but there is no number 44) in Edinburgh's very wealthy New Town (coordinates: 55.95962°N 3.19492°W), and her various roommates and neighbours. She falls in love with her narcissistic flatmate Bruce, meets the intriguing and opinionated anthropologist Domenica Macdonald and her friend Angus, and works at an art gallery for Matthew, who was given the gallery as a sinecure position by his wealthy father.

While working at the gallery Pat points out to Matthew (who knows almost nothing about art) that one of their paintings looks as if it could be a work of Samuel Peploe. After the gallery is broken into Matthew asks Pat to store the painting at their flat until they can check whether it's a genuine Peploe, but Bruce gives the painting to a raffle run by the South Edinburgh Conservative Association. Matthew and Pat eventually track it down to the (real-life) novelist Ian Rankin who gives it back to them.

The other major storyline is that of five-year-old Bertie, who is controlled by his pretentious and domineering mother Irene - he has Grade Six on the saxophone, speaks fluent Italian, and is extremely knowledgeable about various subjects. After he is expelled from his nursery school, Irene sends him to psychotherapy with Dr Fairbairn, who constantly misinterprets Bertie's simple wish to be a normal five-year-old boy.

The following books continue with much the same list of characters and their stories (almost all told in a humorous vein) and a developing list of other people. Some characters age whilst other (such as Bertie) seem to stay the same age throughout.

=== 44 Scotland Street series ===
- See also: Bertie Pollock
1. 2005: 44 Scotland Street
2. 2005: Espresso Tales
3. 2006: Love Over Scotland
4. 2007: The World According to Bertie
5. 2008: The Unbearable Lightness of Scones
6. 2010: The Importance of Being Seven
7. 2011: Bertie Plays The Blues
8. 2012: Sunshine on Scotland Street
9. 2013: Bertie's Guide to Life and Mothers
10. 2015: The Revolving Door of Life
11. 2016: The Bertie Project
12. 2017: A Time of Love and Tartan
13. 2019: The Peppermint Tea Chronicles
14. 2020: A Promise of Ankles
15. 2022: Love in the Time of Bertie
16. 2023: The Enigma of Garlic
17. 2024: The Stellar Debut of Galactica MacFee
18. 2025: Bertie's Theory of Ice Cream
19. 2026:The Prime of Bertie Pollock

== Characters ==
=== Major recurring characters ===
- Pat MacGregor is twenty (see above)
- Matthew Duncan, owner of an art gallery and Pat's boss
- Bertie Pollock, 5-year-old saxophone player who can also speak Italian, son of the dreadful Irene
- Irene Pollock, Bertie's mother, busybody and disciple of Melanie Klein
- Domenica MacDonald, their neighbour
- Bruce Anderson, Pat's narcissistic flatmate
- Angus Lordie, portrait painter and owner of Cyril
- Big Lou, owner of coffee bar
- Stuart Pollock, Bertie's statistician father
- Elspeth Harmony, Bertie's teacher

=== Minor characters ===
- Cyril, Angus's dog with the gold tooth
- Dr. Hugo Fairbairn, Bertie's psychoanalyst, famous for his study of Wee Fraser
- Ian Rankin, Scottish novelist of Rebus fame
- Aloysius (Lard) O'Connor, Glasgow "business man" with the physique of a Munro
- Ramsey Dunbarton, retired lawyer whose main claim to fame is his erstwhile performance as the Duke of Plaza-Toro in The Gondoliers
- Duke of Johannesburg, a dubious Duke who likes to philosophize

== Literary significance and reception ==
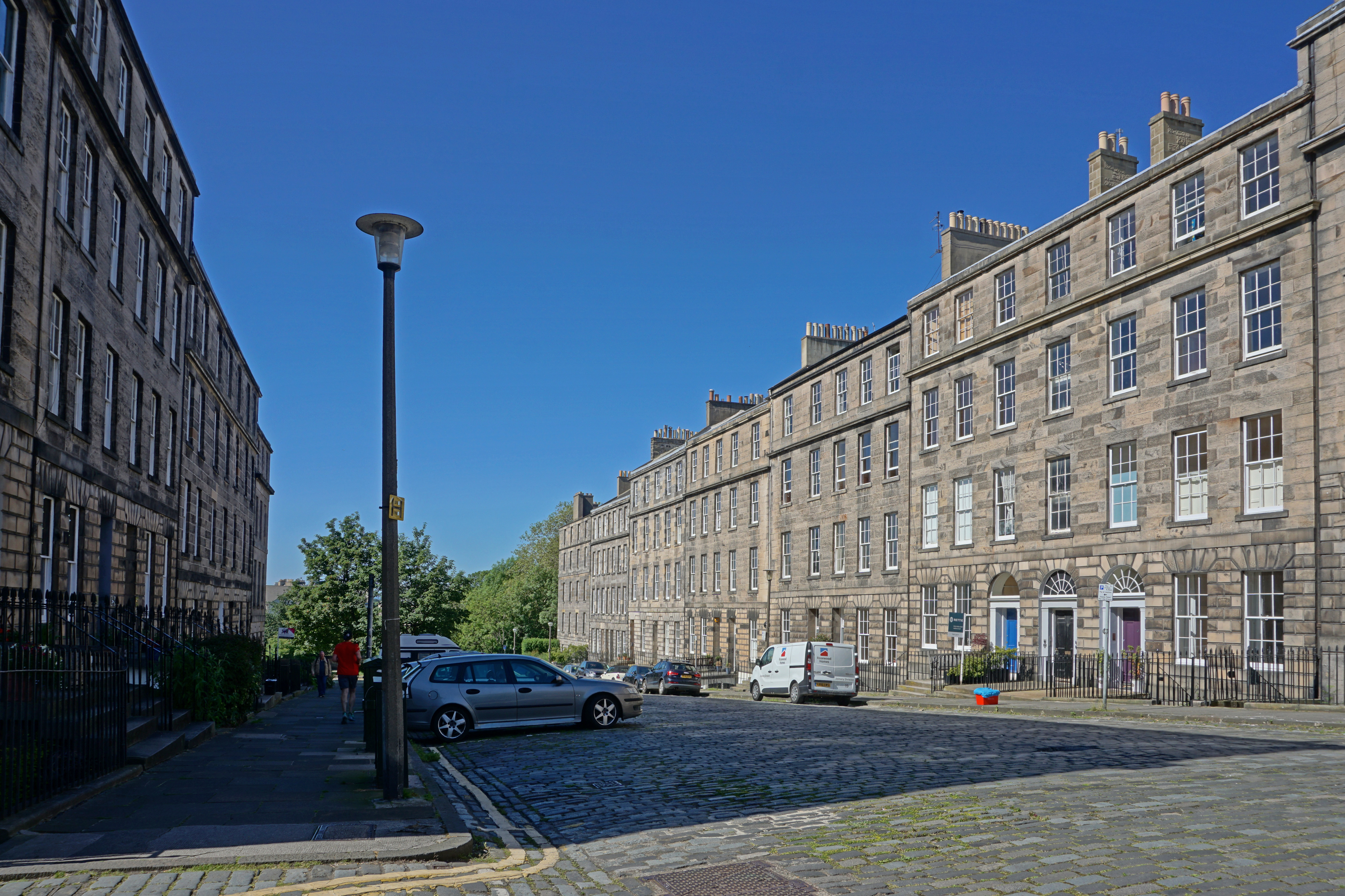
Scotland Street in Edinburgh's New Town

Publishers Weekly said that 44 Scotland Street was "episodic, amusing and peopled with characters both endearing and benignly problematic." Library Journal said that "Smith's insightful and comic observations, makes for an amusing and absorbing look at Edinburgh's high society." The Bookseller said that "the writing style is understated, and the humour subtle but at times devastating."

A stage adaptation, entitled The World According to Bertie, was performed at the 2011 Edinburgh Festival Fringe.

== Television series ==
In 2019 it was announced that the novels would become a television series. It had already been a series on BBC Radio 4.
