= Serial (literature) =

Publishing format

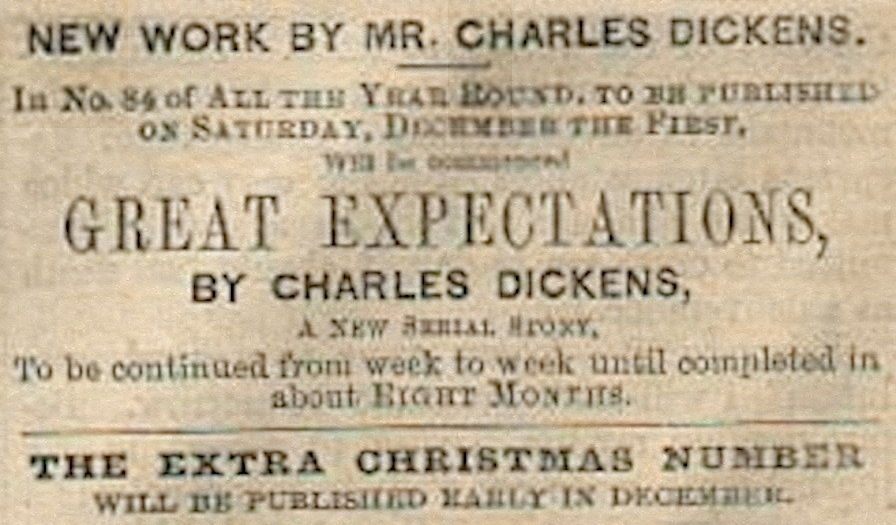
Advertisement for Charles Dickens' Great Expectations, serialised weekly ("to be continued") in the British literary magazine All the Year Round from December 1860 to August 1861

In literature, a serial is a printing or publishing format by which a single larger work, often a work of narrative fiction, is published in smaller, sequential installments. The installments are also known as numbers, parts, fascicules or fascicles, and may be released either as separate publications or within sequential issues of a periodical publication, such as a magazine or newspaper.

Serialisation can also begin with a single short story that is subsequently turned into a series. Historically, such series have been published in periodicals. Popular short-story series are often published together in book form as collections.

== Early history ==
The growth of moveable type in the 17th century prompted episodic and often disconnected narratives such as L'Astrée and Le Grand Cyrus. At that time, books remained a premium item, so to reduce the price and expand the market, publishers produced large works in lower-cost installments called fascicles. These had the added attraction of allowing a publisher to gauge the popularity of a work without incurring the expense of a substantial print run of bound volumes: if the work was not a success, no bound volumes needed to be prepared. If, on the other hand, the serialised book sold well, it was a good bet that bound volumes would sell well, too.

== 19th and early 20th centuries ==
Serialised fiction surged in popularity during Britain's Victorian era, due to a combination of the rise of literacy, technological advances in printing, and improved economics of distribution. Most Victorian novels first appeared as installments in monthly or weekly periodicals. The wild success of Charles Dickens's The Pickwick Papers, first published in 1836, is widely considered to have established the viability and appeal of the serialised format within periodical literature. On the impact of Pickwick and Dickens's serials, Carrie Sickmann Han refers to a passage in the novel concerning Sam Weller, the popular character who first appears in Pickwick's fourth installment:

While carefully crafting a Valentine to his would-be-lover Mary, Sam Weller finishes rather abruptly, and his father, looking over his shoulder, asks, "That's rayther a sudden pull up, ain't it, Sammy?" Sam's response emblematizes the driving force of the serial novel: "Not a bit on it. . . she'll vish there wos more, and that's the great art o' letter writin'". Charles Dickens's great art of serial writing aimed to leave his readers repeatedly wishing there was more: more pages, more plot, more world, and above all, more time with their favourite characters. This desire encouraged readers to imagine beyond the novel – to pursue characters outside the pages of The Pickwick Papers itself. Their desires were rewarded with a wide range of continuations that included theatrical adaptations, plagiarisms, or unauthorized sequels – anything that, like the Valentine, could reunite readers with their beloved Sam.

During that era, the line between "quality" and "commercial" literature was not distinct. Other famous writers who wrote serial literature for popular magazines were Wilkie Collins, inventor of the detective novel with The Moonstone; Anthony Trollope, many of whose novels were published in serial form in Cornhill magazine; and Sir Arthur Conan Doyle, who created the Sherlock Holmes stories originally for serialisation in The Strand magazine.

While American periodicals first syndicated British writers, over time they drew from a growing base of domestic authors. The rise of the periodicals like Harper's and the Atlantic Monthly grew in symbiotic tandem with American literary talent. The magazines nurtured and provided economic sustainability for writers, while the writers helped grow the periodicals' circulation base. During the late 19th century, those that were considered the best American writers first published their work in serial form and then only later in a completed volume format.

As a piece in Scribner's Monthly explained in 1878, "Now it is the second or third rate novelist who cannot get publication in a magazine, and is obliged to publish in a volume, and it is in the magazine that the best novelist always appears first." Among the American writers who wrote in serial form were Henry James and Herman Melville. A large part of the appeal for writers at the time was the broad audiences that serialisation could reach, which would then grow their following for published works. One of the first significant American works to be released in serial format is Uncle Tom's Cabin, by Harriet Beecher Stowe, which was published over a 40-week period by The National Era, an abolitionist periodical, starting with the June 5, 1851 issue.

Serialisation was so standard in American literature that authors from that era often built installment structure into their creative process. James, for example, often had his works divided into multi-part segments of similar length. The consumption of fiction during that time was different than in the 20th century. Instead of being read in a single volume, a novel would often be consumed by readers in installments over a period as long as a year, with the authors and periodicals often responding to audience reaction.

In France, Alexandre Dumas and Eugène Sue were masters of the serialised genre. The Three Musketeers and The Count of Monte Cristo each appeared as a feuilleton. The Count of Monte Cristo was stretched out to 139 installments. Eugène Sue's serial novel Le Juif errant increased circulation of Le Constitutionnel from 3,600 to 25,000. Production in book form soon followed and serialisation was one of the main reasons that nineteenth-century novels were so long. Authors and publishers kept the story going if it was successful since authors were paid by line and by episode. Gustave Flaubert's Madame Bovary was serialised in La Revue de Paris in 1856.

Some writers were prolific. Alexandre Dumas wrote at an incredible pace, oftentimes writing with his partner twelve to fourteen hours a day, working on several novels for serialised publication at once. However, not every writer could keep up with the serial writing pace. Wilkie Collins, for instance, was never more than a week before publication. The difference in writing pace and output in large part determined the author's success, as audience appetite created a demand for further installments.

In the German-speaking countries, the serialised novel was widely popularised by the weekly family magazine Die Gartenlaube, which reached a circulation of 382,000 by 1875. In Russia, The Russian Messenger serialised Leo Tolstoy's Anna Karenina from 1873 to 1877 and Fyodor Dostoevsky's The Brothers Karamazov from 1879 to 1880. In Poland, Bolesław Prus wrote several serialised novels: The Outpost (1885–1886), The Doll (1887–1889), The New Woman (1890–1893), and his sole historical novel, Pharaoh (the latter, exceptionally, written entire over a year's time in 1894–1895 and serialised only after completion, in 1895–1896).

In addition, works in late Qing dynasty China had been serialised. The Nine-tailed Turtle was serialised from 1906 to 1910. Bizarre Happenings Eyewitnessed over Two Decades was serialised in Xin Xiaoshuo (simplified Chinese: 新小说; traditional Chinese: 新小說; Tongyong Pinyin: Xīn Xiǎoshuō; Wade–Giles: Hsin Hsiao-shuo; "New Fiction"), a magazine by Liang Qichao. The first half of Officialdom Unmasked appeared in installments of Shanghai Shijie Fanhua Bao, serialised there from April 1903 to June 1905.

== Late 20th and early 21st centuries ==
With the rise of broadcast—both radio and television series—in the first half of the 20th century, printed periodical fiction began a slow decline as newspapers and magazines shifted their focus from entertainment to information and news. However, some serialisation of novels in periodicals continued, with mixed success.

The first several books in the Tales of the City series by Armistead Maupin appeared from 1978 as regular installments in San Francisco newspapers. Similar serial novels ran in other city newspapers, such as The Serial (1976; Marin County), Tangled Lives (Boston), Bagtime (Chicago), and Federal Triangle (Washington, D.C.). Starting in 1984, Tom Wolfe's The Bonfire of the Vanities, about contemporary New York City, ran in 27 parts in Rolling Stone, partially inspired by the model of Dickens. The magazine paid $200,000 for his work, but Wolfe heavily revised the work before publication as a standalone novel. Alexander McCall Smith, author of The No. 1 Ladies' Detective Agency series, experimented in 2004 with publishing his novel 44 Scotland Street in installments every weekday in The Scotsman. Michael Chabon serialised Gentlemen of the Road in The New York Times Magazine in 2007.

The emergence of the World Wide Web prompted some authors to revise a serial format. Stephen King experimented with The Green Mile (1996) and, less successfully, with the uncompleted The Plant in 2000. Michel Faber allowed The Guardian to serialise his novel The Crimson Petal and the White. In 2005, Orson Scott Card serialised his out-of-print novel Hot Sleep in the first issue of his online magazine, InterGalactic Medicine Show. In 2008 McCall Smith wrote a serialised online novel Corduroy Mansions, with the audio edition read by Andrew Sachs made available at the same pace as the daily publication. In 2011, pseudonymous author Wildbow published Worm, which remains one of the most popular web serials of all time.

Conversely, graphic novels became more popular in this period containing stories that were originally published in a serial format, for example, Alan Moore's Watchmen. Japanese manga, especially shōnen manga, have achieved great success with long-term serialised works, mostly published in manga magazines like Weekly Shōnen Jump. One notable example, Eiichiro Oda's One Piece, has released more than 1133 chapters since its debut in 1997, making it one of the most popular and long running manga series of all time.

The rise of fan fiction on the internet also follows a serial fiction style of publication called a "web serial"; these are seen on websites such as FanFiction.Net and Archive of Our Own (AO3). Aspiring authors have also used the web to publish free-to-read works in serialised format on their own websites as well as web-based communities such as LiveJournal, Fictionpress.com, fictionhub, Kindle Vella and Wattpad. Many of these books receive as many readers as successful novels; some have received the same number of readers as New York Times best-sellers.

In addition, the prevalence of mobile devices made the serial format even more popular with the likes of JukePop Serials, and Serial Box, with iOS and Android apps that focus entirely on curating and promoting serialised novels.

== See also ==
- Book series
- Feuilleton
- Light novel
- Literary cycle
- Partwork
- Series fiction
- Story paper
- Web serial
