= Alexander McCall Smith =

Scottish-Zimbabwean writer and academic

Sir Alexander McCall Smith CBE FRSE FRSL
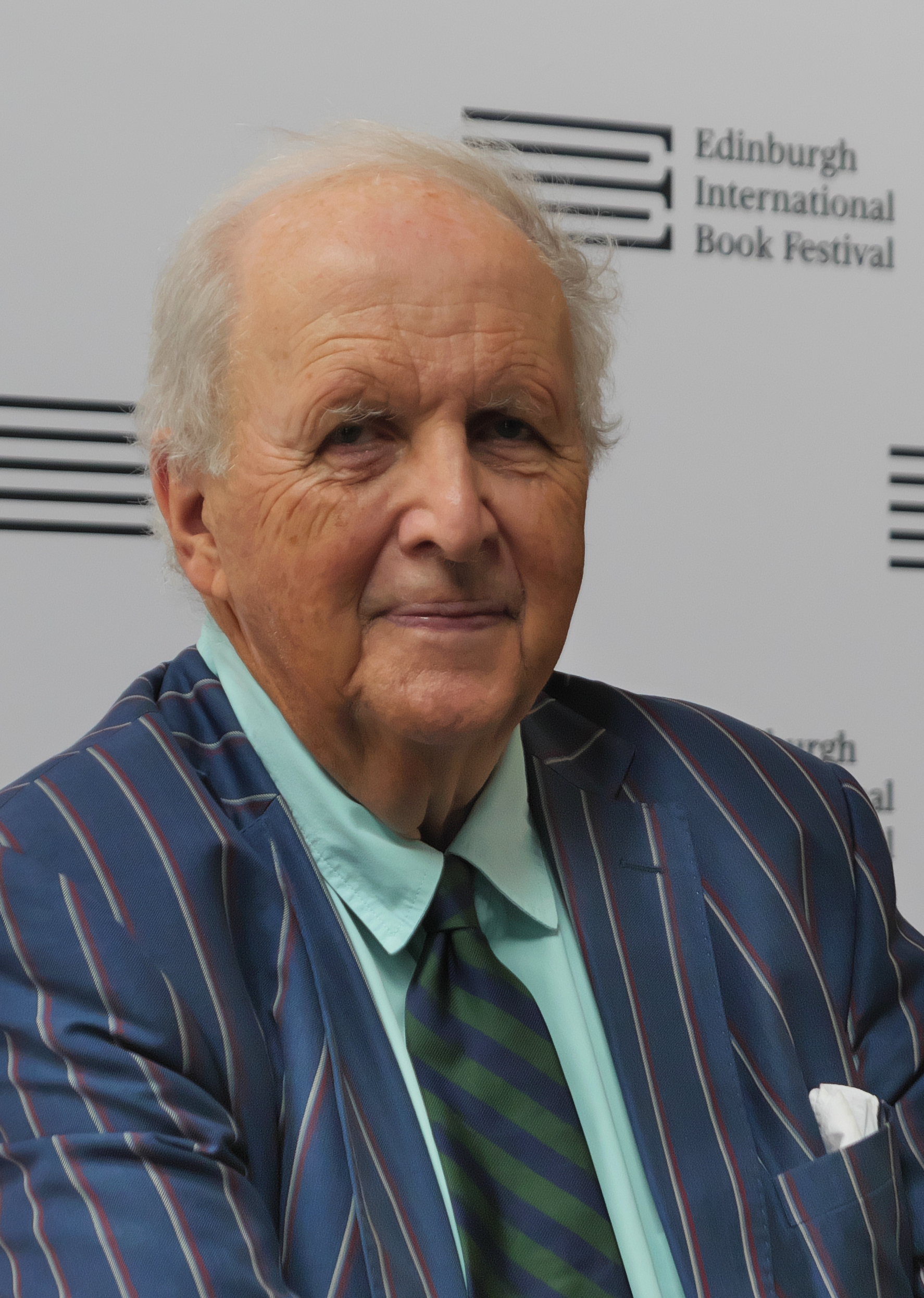
- McCall Smith at 2025 Edinburgh International Book Festival
- Born: Rodney Alexander Alasdair McCall Smith; 24 August 1948 (age 78); Bulawayo, Southern Rhodesia
- Citizenship: United Kingdom
- Education: Christian Brothers College, Bulawayo; University of Edinburgh (LLB, PhD)
- Occupations: Professor of medical law, writer
- Writing career
- Genres: Crime fiction, children's literature, academic non-fiction
- Alexander McCall Smith's voice Recorded January 2010 from the BBC Radio 4 programme Bookclub
- Website: alexandermccallsmith.co.uk

Sir Alexander "Sandy" McCall Smith (born 24 August 1948) is a Rhodesian/Zimbabwean-Scottish legal scholar and author of fiction. He was born and raised in Southern Rhodesia (now Zimbabwe) and was formerly Professor of Medical Law at the University of Edinburgh. He became an expert on medical law and bioethics and served on related British and international committees. He has since become known as a fiction writer, with sales in English exceeding 40 million by 2010 and translations into 46 languages. He is known as the creator of The No. 1 Ladies' Detective Agency series.

== Early life ==
Rodney Alexander Alasdair McCall Smith was born in 1948 in Bulawayo in the British colony of Southern Rhodesia (present-day Zimbabwe), to British parents. He has three older sisters. His father worked as a public prosecutor in Bulawayo. McCall Smith was educated at the Christian Brothers College in Bulawayo before moving to Scotland at age 17 to study law at the University of Edinburgh, where he earned his LLB and PhD degrees. He then taught at Queen's University Belfast, and while teaching there he entered a literary competition, submitting in the children's and adult categories. He won in the children's category.

McCall Smith's paternal grandfather, George McCall Smith, born in Nairn, abandoned his wife and four children in Scotland and ran off with one of his patients to New Zealand in 1914. They settled in Rawene where he became the medical doctor and a community leader.

== Law education career ==
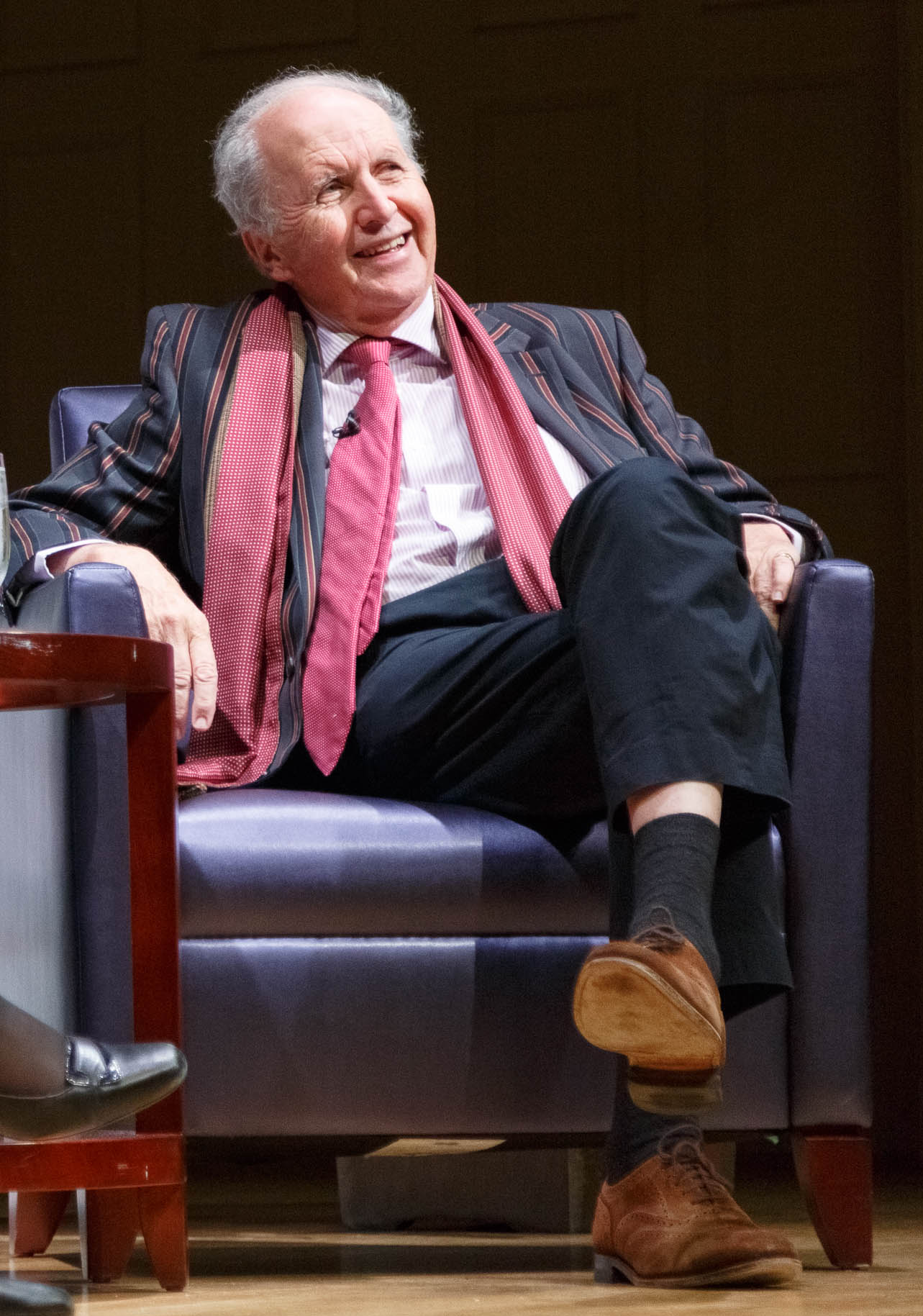
McCall Smith speaking at the Library of Congress in 2019

McCall Smith returned to southern Africa in 1981 to help co-found the law school and teach law at the University of Botswana. While there, he co-wrote The Criminal Law of Botswana (1992).

He was Professor of Medical Law at the University of Edinburgh and is now emeritus professor at its School of Law. He was part of an advisory committee for the James Tait Black Memorial Prize.

McCall Smith is the former chairman of the Ethics Committee of the British Medical Journal (until 2002), the former vice-chairman of the Human Genetics Commission of the United Kingdom, and a former member of the International Bioethics Committee of UNESCO. He gave up those commitments after achieving success as a writer.

== Honours ==
McCall Smith was appointed a Commander of the British Empire in the 2007 New Year Honours issued at the end of December 2006, for services to literature. In the 2024 New Year Honours he was appointed Knight Bachelor for services to Literature, to Academia and to Charity.

In June 2007, he was awarded an honorary Doctor of Laws degree at a ceremony celebrating the tercentenary of the University of Edinburgh School of Law. In June 2015 he was awarded an honorary Doctor of Letters degree at a graduation ceremony at the University of St Andrews.

== Personal life ==
He settled in Edinburgh, Scotland, after studying there. He and his wife Elizabeth, a physician, bought and renovated a large Victorian house in the Merchiston area of the city. They have lived there since, raising their two daughters.

An amateur bassoonist, he co-founded The Really Terrible Orchestra. He helped to found Botswana's first centre for opera training, the Number 1 Ladies' Opera House, for whom he wrote the libretto of their first production, a version of Macbeth set among a troupe of baboons in the Okavango Delta.

In 2009 he received the Golden Plate Award of the American Academy of Achievement, presented by Desmond Tutu at an awards ceremony at St. George's Cathedral, Cape Town, South Africa.

In 2012 he appeared in a documentary about the life and work of author W. Somerset Maugham, Revealing Mr. Maugham.

In 2014 McCall Smith purchased the Cairns of Coll, a chain of uninhabited islets in the Hebrides. He said: "I intend to do absolutely nothing with them, and to ensure that, after I am gone, they are held in trust, unspoilt and uninhabited, for the nation. I want them kept in perpetuity as a sanctuary for wildlife – for birds and seals and all the other creatures to which they are home."

During a visit to New Zealand in 2014, McCall Smith visited Rawene, where his grandfather, George McCall Smith, ran the hospital for 34 years and created the Hokianga area health service.

== Writing career ==
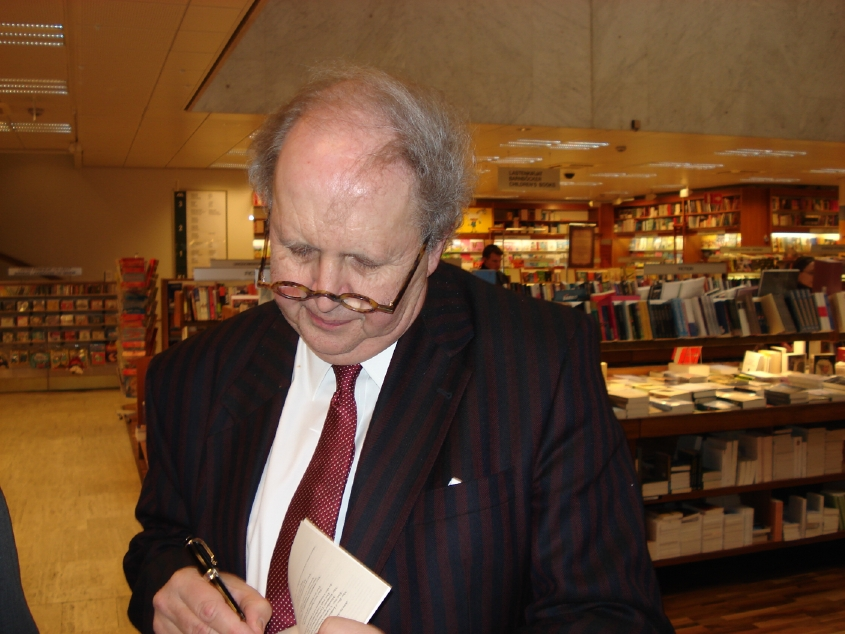
McCall Smith signing books in Helsinki in April 2007

McCall Smith has gained the most fame for his No. 1 Ladies Detective Agency series, featuring Precious Ramotswe and set in Gaborone, Botswana. The first novel was published in 1998. By 2009, the series had sold more than 20 million copies in English editions.

He published 30 books in the 1980s and 1990s before he began that series. In 2008 he wrote a serialised online novel called Corduroy Mansions, with the audio edition read by Andrew Sachs made available at the same pace as the daily publication.

In 2009 he donated the short story "Still Life" to Oxfam's Ox-Tales project, which comprised four collections of stories written by 38 British authors. McCall Smith's story was published in the Air collection.

In 2020 he published a collection of poetry entitled In a Time of Distance: And Other Poems.

== See also ==
- White Zimbabweans
