= Dingshan =

Dingshan may refer to:

== Places in China ==
- Dingshan Bridge, a bridge in Chongqing
- Dingshan, Chongqing (丁山镇), a town in Qijiang, Chongqing
- Dingshan, Jiangxi (定山镇), a town in Pengze County, Jiujiang, Jiangxi Province
- Dingshan Subdistrict (顶山街道), Pukou, Nanjing, Jiangsu province
- Dingshan Subdistrict (鼎山街道), Jiangjin, Chongqing
- Dingshan Temple, a Buddhist temple in Pukou, Nanjing, Jiangsu province
- Dingshan Town (鼎山镇), Bazhou, Bazhong, Sichuan Province
- Dingshan Township, Xunwu County (顶山乡), in Xunwu County, Ganzhou, Jiangxi province

== Places elsewhere ==
- Dingshan Village (頂山里), Cigu District, Tainan, Taiwan

== People ==
- Chen Dingshan (陳定山; 1897–1987), Chinese calligrapher, painter and writer, Chen Xiaocui's brother
- Nian Dingshan (粘丁山), a leader of White Party, Taiwan
- Xue Dingshan (薛丁山), a fictional Tang dynasty general from Chinese folktale, Fan Lihua‘s husband

== See also ==
- Dingshan Street light rail station, a light rail station of Circular light rail, Kaohsiung, Taiwan
