= Chen Diexian =

Chinese writer and industrialist (1879–1940)

- 陈蝶仙
- Born: Chen Shousong; 1879; Hangzhou, Qing China
- Died: March 24, 1940 (aged 60–61); Japanese-occupied Shanghai
- Children: Chen Xiaodie; Chen Cidie; Chen Xiaocui
- Parents: Chen Fuyuan; Dai

Chinese name
- Chinese: 陳栩
Transcriptions
Standard Mandarin
- Hanyu Pinyin: Chén Xǔ
- Wade–Giles: Ch'en Hsü

Birth name
- Traditional Chinese: 陈壽嵩
- Simplified Chinese: 陈寿嵩
Transcriptions
Standard Mandarin
- Hanyu Pinyin: Chén Shòusōng
- Wade–Giles: Ch'en Shou-sung

Art name
- Chinese: 陈蝶仙
Transcriptions
Standard Mandarin
- Hanyu Pinyin: Chén Diéxiān
- Wade–Giles: Ch'en Tieh-hsien

Pen name
- Chinese: 天虛我生
Transcriptions
Standard Mandarin
- Hanyu Pinyin: Tiānxūwǒshēng
- Wade–Giles: T'ien-hsü-wo-sheng

Chen Diexian (Chinese: 陈蝶仙, 1879 – 24 March 1940) was a Chinese writer, editor, and industrialist. Born in Hangzhou to a wealthy physician and his concubine, he received a traditional education and passed the imperial examinations in 1893. A writer from a young age, Chen quit his job as a tea and bamboo trader in 1899 to found a newspaper titled Daguanbao, which published many of his poems and stories. After the paper was banned by the imperial government due to its opposition to the Boxer Rebellion, he established a Hangzhou store selling imported scientific and musical instruments, a printing company, and a short-lived literary journal he titled Zhuzuolin.

In 1913, Chen wrote The Money Demon, an autobiographical novel centered around his romantic experiences. This was serialized in the Shen Bao literary supplement, Ziyoutan. After briefly serving as the editor for the magazines The Pasttime and Woman's World, he was appointed as editor of Ziyoutan in 1916, a position he held for two years before stepping away to focus on his business ventures. Long an amateur chemist, he discovered an inexpensive means to manufacture magnesium carbonate around 1915. Two years later, he founded a company named Household Industries to manufacture toothpowder using an improved version of his method. After dramatic commercial success, he expanded the company into various fields including cosmetics and other household products. By 1934, it was the second-largest cosmetics manufacturer in China. The Japanese invasion in 1937 devastated the company and resulted in the loss of many of its factories, and Chen died of an illness while under Japanese occupation in 1940.

== Early life ==
In 1879, Chen Diexian was born Chen Shousong (陈壽嵩) in the city of Hangzhou, Zhejiang, China. His father Chen Fuyuan (陈福元) was a physician who lived alongside his brother (an official) in at a family property in the city, on which resided sixty people (including their relatives and servants). Fuyuan's first wife was killed during the Taiping Rebellion, and he remarried to a woman named Wang (王). Frequently in ill health, she never had a child with Fuyuan; instead, at her suggestion, he took a concubine named Dai (戴), whom he had found as a homeless orphan during the rebellion. Dai had four sons with Fuyuan, the third of whom was Chen Shousong.

Chen Fuyuan died in 1885, followed by Dai in 1893. Chen changed his name to Chen Xu (陳栩) when he was young, received a classical literary education, and passed the county-level imperial examinations in 1893. Chen featured his early romantic experiences heavily in his poetry and writings. These portray his cousin and fellow poet Gu Yinglian as his first romantic interest. Despite their similar ages, they were purportedly prevented from marrying due to belonging to different generations. Wang had betrothed Chen to a woman named Zhu Shu (朱恕) during his childhood, and the two married in 1897. However, despite a comfortable relationship with Zhu, Chen continued to have romantic feelings for a family friend named Zhenglou and the two entered an affair. Zhu reportedly discovered the affair in 1898, and attempted to arrange for Zhenglou to become Chen's concubine. Zhenglou declined due to her dislike of Dai; however, Zhenglou and Chen continued an intermittent romantic relationship over the following decade.

After his uncle's death later in 1897, the Chen family was split by an inheritance dispute. Chen moved with his mother and two of his brothers to a house near Mount Ziyang, south of Hangzhou.

== Writing career ==
Chen is frequently known by his art name Diexian (蝶仙; 'butterfly immortal'), although he wrote fiction with the pen name Tianxuwosheng (天虛我生; 'heaven bore me in vain') and poetry as Xihongsheng (惜紅生; 'master of Studio Xihong'). By the age of 14, he had written his first tanci (a genre of Chinese ballad). Chen's works often focused on erotic themes and romance, especially around his own romantic life. He was greatly inspired by the classic Chinese novel Dream of the Red Chamber, including many characters from the work in his first tanci. Around 1896 and 1897, he wrote two romance novels—Luohua meng and Leizhu yuan—incorporating both fictional and autobiographical elements while taking inspiration from Dream of the Red Chamber.

In 1898, Chen's mother pressured him to leave the house in become a customs commissioner at the nearby town of Wukang. He quit this position the next year and began selling tea and bamboo, although this venture also proved unsuccessful. With two of his friends, he began a daily newspaper he named Daguanbao (大觀報). This paper published many of the trio's literary works, including Chen's poetry (mainly of the zhuzhici and tanci genres). Beginning in 1900, he serialized a novel he titled Teardrop Destiny in the newspaper over 120 chapters.

Also in 1900, Chen published a compilation of his own poems, which he named Bamboo-Branch Poetry from the Gongchen Bridge, focusing on various aspects of local life in Hangzhou, including the import of western-style technology such as lampposts, bicycles, photography, and steamships. Around this time, the Daguanbao was banned for its opposition to the Boxer Rebellion; he attempted to start another newspaper shortly afterwards, which was also banned. He set up a lithographic printing company in 1902, and four years later established a public library and reading room he dubbed Baomu She (飽目社; 'Read for Yourself Society'). In 1907, he established a short-lived literary journal titled Zhuzuolin (著作林; 'Writing Forest'), which specialized in poetry and essays. These were discontinued with the collapse of the rest of his business ventures in 1908.

Cover of a 1935 edition of The Money Demon, Chen's 1913 autobiographical novel

While working in Ningbo as a staff adviser in 1913, Chen wrote an autobiographical novel titled The Money Demon, centered around his romantic experiences. This was serialized in the Shen Bao newspaper's literary supplement, Ziyoutan. He was appointed as the editor-in-chief of the Shanghai magazine The Pasttime (遊戲雜誌; Yóuxì zázhì) in December 1913, and the following year was hired as the editor for a woman's magazine entitled Woman's World (女子世界; Nǚzǐ shìjiè). This journal was unable to compete with the Commercial Press's own magazine, The Ladies' Journal, and it went out of publication after just seven issues in 1915.

In late 1916, Chen was hired as the editor of the Ziyoutan. He enlisted his teenage children, Chen Dingshan and Chen Xiaocui, to assist him in writing for the column. He resigned as editor for the Ziyoutan in September 1918, instead focusing on his column "Common Household Knowledge", (家庭常識; Jiātíng chángshì) which he continued editing until 1927. This column was later compiled and published as a book series titled Compiled Common Household Knowledge (家庭常識彙編; Jiātíng chángshì huìbiān), which was published through eight volumes and twenty different editions from 1918 to 1941. With entries gathered from contributors and reader submissions, the series was divided into sections covering topics such as animals, food, technology, and clothing. Seeking to educate the public on industrial processes through simple language, Chen included recipes for basic industrial products such as synthetic fibers, camphor, cosmetics, and candles.

He stepped away from his literary work around 1917 or 1918 in order to focus on his business, although occasionally continued to write poetry and essays.

== Industrialism ==
Despite severe debt, Chen established the Cuili Company (萃禾公司; 'Gather Benefit Company') in 1901, situated at Qinghefang on the shore of the West Lake. He began selling books, stationery, and imported scientific and musical instruments, as well as the city's first phonograph. Due to its focus on imported technology, the shop was ridiculed by many of his more conservative peers.

Chen invited the Japanese consul in Hangzhou to stay and tutor him in chemistry, seeking to create a home chemistry laboratory. Fascinated with science, he experimented with inventions such as a fire extinguisher; he later recalled gathering a group of friends near Hangzhou to watch him light several hay bales on fire and extinguish them with his extinguisher. However, the device malfunctioned and could not put out the flames.

Upset that foreign companies held a monopoly on the production of toothpowder, Chen researched the chemicals involved in its production. He found that a brand of Japanese toothpowder was made with calcium carbonate, while a more effective and expensive Russian brand used magnesium carbonate. After initial experimentation with sourcing the material from cuttlefish shells, he was able to develop an inexpensive means of producing magnesium carbonate from lye. Chen was initially uninterested in producing the toothpowder himself, publishing the recipe freely in a 1915 edition of Woman's World. He later improved the formula and founded the company Household Industries (家庭工業社; Jiātíng gōngyè shè) to produce it in 1917.

The toothpowder was commercially successful, bolstered by patriotic advertisements, and allowed Chen to expand Household Industries to produce various other products, including cosmetics. By 1923, Household Industries employed 360 workers, split across facilities producing magnesium, toothpowder, toothbrushes, peppermint, talcum powder, boxes, stationery, and textiles. It manufactured soda water as a byproduct of magnesium manufacture, later branching out its beverage production to include wine and liquor. By 1934, Household Industries employed a staff of 420 people, and was the second-largest manufacturer of household goods and cosmetics (behind the China Chemical Industries Company). The company enjoyed a practical domestic monopoly on toothpaste, toothpowder, and face powder. Its expansion plateaued around the mid-1930s, and it sought to scale back some of its operations to increase profit. The outbreak of the Second Sino-Japanese War in 1937 devastated the company, with many of its factories destroyed by Japanese bombing.

In 1938, Chen returned to Japanese-occupied Shanghai in order to care for his ailing wife. There, he died of illness on 24 March 1940.
