= The Money Demon =

1913 Chinese novel

- 1935 edition of The Money Demon
- Author: Chen Diexian
- Original title: 黃金祟
- Language: Classical Chinese
- Genre: Romance, autobiographical novel
- Publication date: June to October 1913

The Money Demon (Chinese: 黃金祟; pinyin: Huángjīn suì) is an autobiographical novel written by Chinese poet and industrialist Chen Diexian in 1913, under his pen name "Heaven Bore Me in Vain" (天虛我生; Tiān xū wǒ shēng). It was serialized in the Ziyoutan literary supplement to the Shanghai newspaper Shen Bao from June to October 1913, before being published as a book the following year. Featuring a fictionalized version of his own life, the novel details Chen's various romantic relationships, especially revolving around his relationship with his wife Zhu Shu and his long-term partner, Zhenglou.

== Background ==
Chen Xu, better known by Chen Diexian (his art name), was a Chinese poet and industrialist born in Hangzhou in 1879. Chen wrote poetry from a young age; he reported writing his first tanci (a form of ballad incorporating spoken portions) around 1893. By 1900, he had written a volume of collected works, an opera, a novel, and various poems and songs. He wrote prolifically through the following decades (his 1923 bibliography lists 31 novels), although he stopped writing around 1917 in order to focus on his career as an industrialist.

Chen's work often focused on romance and erotic themes. He was greatly inspired by the classic Chinese novel Dream of the Red Chamber; he included many characters from the work in his first tanci. Around 1896 and 1897, he wrote two romance novels—Luohua meng and Leizhu yuan—inspired by Dream of the Red Chamber and incorporating both fictional and autobiographical elements. Many of his poems also focus on his personal romances.

According to his works, Chen's first romantic partner was his cousin and fellow poet Gu Yinglian. The main love interest of his Luohua meng, she was purportedly prevented from marrying Chen due to "belonging to the following generation" despite being three years older than him, who then either drowns or "dies from melancholy" in Chen's semi-autobiographical works. His second novel includes his dalliances with Gu and Zhu Shu, the latter of whom he married in 1897. However, he continued to have deep romantic feelings for another woman he had been previously involved with, a family friend named Zhenglou. Zhu purportedly discovered their romance in 1898, and attempted to convince his mother to allow him to take Zhenglou as a concubine. Seeing his mother as an overly harsh person, she did not agree to become his concubine, although occasionally maintained her romantic relationship with Chen.

== Plot ==
The book begins with an introductory scene: an anonymous critic complains to Chen that it is unreasonable to center a romance novel around money. Chen dismisses him, saying "Here I shall speak not of the money-grubbers of this world, but of my own life, in which money has bedeviled me at every turn".

Opening with Chen as a six-year-old meeting Zhenglou for the first time, the novel narrates his romantic relationships and infatuations throughout his childhood and adolescence. Although his betrothal to Zhu Shu prevents him from marrying Zhenglou, he continues to flirt with her and (in less serious terms) her sister throughout the narrative. He is nevertheless happily married to Zhu Shu, who is depicted as a faithful and understanding wife who offers to help him legitimize his relationship with Zhenglou through concubinage.

It ends with a imagined rejection from Zhenglou and a note that she and Chen continue to be "together one moment and apart the next, without a definite resolution".

== Publication ==
Although Chen's earlier romances were in written vernacular Chinese, The Money Demon was composed in Literary Chinese. The book was serialized in the Ziyoutan, a literary supplement to the Shanghai newspaper Shen Bao from June to October 1913, credited to Chen's pen name "Heaven Bore Me in Vain" (天虛我生; Tiān xū wǒ shēng).

It was published as a book in 1914, featuring a postscript written by his friend Zhou Zhisheng. This section (incorrectly) asserts that it is written as a truthful autobiography, unlike his earlier semi-fictional romance novels. According to this postscript, the names The True Destiny of Tears and The Zhenglou Story were previously considered as names for the book before Chen settled on The Money Demon. An English translation was produced by New Zealand sinologist and translator Patrick Hanan in 1999.
