= Zhou Lianxia =

Chinese painter, poet and writer (1906–2000)

- Zhou in Shanghai, Republic of China in 1937
- Born: October 20, 1906; Xiangtan, Qing dynasty
- Died: April 13, 2000 (aged 93); Los Angeles, California
- Occupations: Painter; Poet; Writer
- Spouse: Xu Wanping 徐晚蘋 (m. 1927)

Chinese name
- Traditional Chinese: 周錬霞
- Simplified Chinese: 周炼霞
Transcriptions
Standard Mandarin
- Hanyu Pinyin: Zhōu Liànxiá
- Wade–Giles: Chou^{1} Lien^{4}-hsia^{2}

Ziyi
- Chinese: 紫宜
Transcriptions
Standard Mandarin
- Hanyu Pinyin: Zǐyí
- Wade–Giles: Tzu^{3}I^{2}

Zhou Lianxia (traditional Chinese: 周錬霞; simplified Chinese: 周炼霞; pinyin: Zhōu Liànxiá; Wade–Giles: Chou^{1} Lien^{4}-Hsia^{2}; October 20, 1906 – April 13, 2000), also known as Ziyi (紫宜), was recognized as one of the top women painters, poets and writers in China of the Republican Period, famous for her elegant, traditional Chinese style paintings and poems, mastered after decades of training and scholarship. Considered by her contemporaries to be talented, poised and beautiful, she became a cultural icon in the 1930s, known as the "Golden Lady of the Country."

Noted for her wit and humor, Zhou was a part of a circle of famous friends and celebrities of the New Culture Movement of that era that included: famous writer, Eileen Chang (張愛玲), top-ranked artists, Zhang Daqian (張大千), Lu Xiaoman (陸小曼), Xu Beihong (徐悲鴻), Qian Shoutie (錢瘦鐵), Song Xunlun (宋訓倫), Wu Qingxia (吴青霞), famous poet, Xu Zhimo (徐志摩), renowned collector, poet and connoisseur Wu Hufan (吳湖帆) and her husband, writer and photographer, Xu Wanping (徐晚蘋).

In addition to her painting and poetry, Zhou was an early feminist in the women's movement and became a prominent newspaper and magazine artist, columnist and short story writer, penning essays and articles on art, culture, and women, as well as fashion and beauty insights.

As an artist, Zhou Lianxia specialized in meticulous traditional Chinese ink and brush paintings that spoke to humanity's balance with nature, featuring delicate flowers, fish, birds and butterflies, as well as elegant ladies. Her painting style was fresh, using bright and clean colors in some works, and elegant, muted tones in others to symbolize and evoke different moods.

She had a profound understanding of how to pair a specific poem with a painting to enhance both their meanings. She authored many poems that became famous in China, including, 但使兩心相照, 無燈無月何妨 and is the author of "The Collection of Poems嚶友詩集", "A Brief Talk on Learning Poems學詩淺說" (in cooperation with Qu Xieyuan瞿蛻園).

Prominent galleries and museums worldwide have featured Zhou's work, including the Norton Museum of Art and the Shanghai Museum, and she continues to be a favorite among international collectors.

== Life ==
=== Early life and education ===
Zhou was born to a wealthy and scholarly family in Xiangtan, Hunan in 1906. She began studying poetry from the Qing dynasty onwards with private tutor at the early age of three, for which she showed an unusual aptitude, eventually memorizing thousands of classical poems. She began training in classical painting techniques and forms with prominent scholar, Yin Hebai (尹和白). After Zhou moved to Shanghai with her family at the age of 14, she became official student of prominent painting master, Zheng Dening (郑德凝). At the age of 17, she began an advanced poetry instruction under the leading master Zhu Guwei (朱古微). She received additional advanced instruction from the renowned master, Jiang Meisheng (蔣梅笙) and became best friends with his daughter, the celebrity socialite, Jiang Biwei (蔣碧薇).

=== Career ===
One of Zhou's traditional Chinese paintings

In the 1930s, Zhou taught at XiZhen School for Girls (錫珍女校) as an art professor. With noted women artists, Feng Wenfeng (馮文鳳), Wu Qingxia (吳青霞), Chen Xiaocui (陳小翠), Li Qiujun (李秋君), Lu Xiaoman (陸小曼), Yang Xuejiu (楊雪玖) and other talented female artists of the era, she co-founded the prestigious Shanghai Calligraphy and Painting Society(中國女子書畫會) which still exists today. In 1936, her painting won the Gold Medal at the First International Art Exhibition in Canada, and her name was included in the "World Celebrity Dictionary," published in the UK and Italy.

During the Anti-Japanese War period, writing along with other prominent writers like Eileen Chang (張愛玲), Zhou began to publish inspiring short stories designed to lift the spirits of her fellow Chinese. She was on the editorial board for the "Wanxiang萬象" Comprehensive Literary Monthly publication.

In the 1950s and 1960s, she was employed as a Professor of Art at the prestigious Shanghai Academy of Chinese Painting (上海中國畫院), where she mainly produced works for the Academy. During the turbulent 1960s, she was blinded in one eye, which curtailed her ability to paint for many years.

In 1980, Zhou immigrated to America, where she received treatment for her damaged eye and was able to resume painting. Los Angeles mayor Tom Bradley presented the "Outstanding Women in Art" Honorary Award to her for her lifetime achievement in Art and Culture.

=== Personal life ===
At the age of 18, Zhou's work began to appear in major newspapers. By the age of 21, she had become a leading artist for the famous Wang Xin Ji Fan shop, which catered to the nobility and elite of Shanghai. In 1927, she married noted photographer and writer Xu Wanping(徐晚蘋), whom she considered her "soulmate." They had five children together and collaborated on publications of photos and poems.

In 1949, Xu took a short business trip to Formosa to help lead China's effort to take back the postal communication system on the island from the Japanese. Tragically ill-timed, this short trip caused Zhou and Xu to become inadvertently separated from one another for over 30 years when the borders between China and Formosa were closed in 1949.

Zhou Lianxia, age 40, in 1946

Forced to support their five children on her own, Zhou continued painting and writing, always seeking new and innovative avenues of expression. She continued to collaborate with her friends Lu Xiaoman(陸小曼), Zhang Daqian (張大千), Qian Shoutie (錢瘦鐵), Song Xunlun (宋訓倫)and Wu Hufan (吳湖帆). Zhou and Wu created many exceptional artworks together during the 1950s, including the famous "Lotus and Mandarin Ducks," a painting and a poem, which is much sought after by collectors worldwide.

Zhou was reunited with her long-lost husband Xu Wanping in America in 1980. They lived together in Los Angeles with their children, Xu Zhaonan (徐昭南) and Xu Yuzhong (徐昱中), and grandchildren, including noted film producer, Evelyn Xu (徐汪瑒), until Xu's passing at the age of 95 and Zhou, at the age of 93.

== See also ==
- Chen Xiaocui
- The Culture Arts Review
- Liang Xueqing
