= Chen Dingshan =

Chinese calligrapher, artist and poet (1897–1987)

- Chen Dingshan, c. 1970s
- Born: Chen Qu (陳蘧); 1897; Hangzhou, Zhejiang, Qing China
- Died: 1987 (aged 89–90); Taiwan
- Occupations: Author, calligrapher, painter

Chinese name
- Traditional Chinese: 陳定山
- Simplified Chinese: 陈定山
Transcriptions
Standard Mandarin
- Hanyu Pinyin: Chén Dìngshān
- Wade–Giles: Ch`en^{2} Ting^{4}shan^{1}

Chen Dingshan (Note: Traditional Chinese: 陳定山; simplified Chinese: 陈定山; pinyin: Chén Dìngshān.) (1897–1987) was a Chinese calligrapher, artist, and poet. The son of a writer-cum-industrialist, Chen practised the arts from a young age, and in the 1920s became a prominent member of the Shanghai art scene. He organized several exhibitions and associations, while also establishing his own domicile and restaurant in his native Hangzhou. In 1948, toward the end of the Chinese Civil War, Chen moved to Taiwan, where he wrote extensively and published several collections of anecdotes.

A prolific author, Chen generally used a vernacularized form of classical Chinese, with a particular focus on anecdotes about early 20th-century Shanghai. Although often dismissed in histories of Chinese and Taiwanese literature, several compilations of Chen's works have been published since 2016.

== Biography ==
=== Early life ===
Chen was born in Chen Qu (陳蘧) in Hangzhou, Zhejiang, in 1897. The son of Chen Diexian, a Mandarin Ducks and Butterflies writer and industrialist, Chen had a younger sister, Chen Xiaocui, who also became a writer, as well as a brother, Chen Cidie, who became an artist. He studied calligraphy in his youth, drawing from the examples of Huang Tingjian, Yu Shinan, and Chu Suiliang; he also practised art, poetry, and music, and his father hired a Japanese man to teach him chemistry. In his teenage years, Chen began to help his father write novels; as an adult, he thus took the courtesy name Xiaodie (小蝶; 'Little Butterfly / Dié', in relation to his father's name "Diexian"). He was enrolled at St. John's University, Shanghai, but later withdrew and assisted his father in industrial business. He married Zhang Xianjun (張嫻君) in 1920, and their only son Chen Keyan (陳克言) was born in 1922. In 1928, Zheng Shiyun (鄭十雲) became Chen's second wife.

Chen became active in the art scene of the Republic of China, establishing the Chinese Art Association and the Painting and Calligraphy Association in Shanghai. In the 1920s, he was on the committee that inaugurated the First National Art Exhibition of 1929. He was also active outside Shanghai. In the mid-1920s, he acquired 18 acres (7.3 ha) near the West Lake in Hangzhou, where the Ming artist Li Liufang had painted, and built a home; this building was later destroyed during the Second Sino-Japanese War. He served as the director of the Xiuzhi Guan of Hangzhou (修志館; 'Office of Editing Local History'), as well as the owner of the Die Lai Restaurant. The restaurant was named after the actresses Hu Die and Xu Lai, who both attended the ribbon-cutting opening ceremony in 1931. He later helped organize the 1935 London International Exhibition of Chinese Art.

During the Second Sino-Japanese War, Shanghai fell to Japanese control in November 1937. Chen and his extended family fled via Wuhu and Hankou to Kunming. In 1939 he accompanied his ill father to return to Shanghai, who died in 1940. Chen was soon arrested by the Japanese military police on suspicion of ties to the Chongqing Government. He was jailed in Penglai for seven days, but his second wife Zheng campaigned with the actress Xu Lai for his release.

After the war, Chen helped organize the Exhibition of Chinese Paintings from the Past Century (中國近百年畫展) in the Shanghai French Concession in 1947. Chen adopted the name "Dingshan" at the age of forty. He was also active under the name "Dieye" (蝶野).

=== Taiwan ===
In 1948, Chen moved to Taiwan with his wives Zhang Xianjun and Zheng Shiyun, among the many Chinese who left the mainland when it appeared that the Chinese Communist Party would win the Civil War. Living at times with the artist Luo Qiyuan and at other times with market manager Tang Zhanhi, he continued to write, first being asked by his friend Zhao Junhao to edit the Typhoon – a supplement to the newspaper The Economic Times – before being contacted to contribute to the magazine Changliu and the newspaper China Daily. His articles saw wide distribution, from Hong Kong and Taiwan through the Philippines.

Much of Chen's early writing continued explorations of his experiences in Shanghai. During the 1950s he produced several collections of more than two hundred anecdotes, including Old News from Chun Shen (春申舊聞, 1954) and More News from Chun Shen (春申續聞, 1955). Other publications produced in this period included the five-volume romance The Butterfly Dreams of Flowers (蝶夢花酣, 1957) and the Golden World trilogy (黃金世界, 1955–1967). These works were generally serialized first in newspapers before being compiled and published in book format.

He wrote several works on the history of Chinese art, including Five Hundred Years of Painting Schools (五百年畫派概論) and Biographies of Master Painters in the Last Hundred Years (近百年名家畫傳). In the 1970s, he contributed numerous poems and essays to the magazines Adult (大人) and Dacheng (大成), predominantly reminiscing on pre-war Shanghai culture but also exploring the developments in Taiwan and Hong Kong.

After Chen came to Taiwan, he taught at National Chung Hsing University, Tamkang College of Arts and Sciences, (Note: Renamed "Tamkang University" in 1980.) and Providence College of Arts and Sciences for Women. (Note: Renamed "Providence University" in 1993.) Chen continued to write and paint in his old age, at times surprising guests by doing so after drinking large amounts of brandy. He died in 1987.

== Legacy ==
The literary historian Nicole Huang writes that, in studies of Taiwanese literature, Chen has generally been dismissed as a writer of historical fiction, generally mentioned only as inspiring Li Ang's The Butcher's Wife through one of his anecdotes. In the context of mainland Chinese literature, Chen – as one of the authors most commonly associated with Shanghai's tabloids – has likewise been dismissed. Tabloid literature has been framed negatively in studies of China's literary history, and its authors have been maligned.

Old News from Chun Shen and More News from Chun Shen were republished by the World Cultural Relics Publishing House in 1976 and 1977, respectively. In 2016, the writer Cai Dengshan published a new edition of these works through Xiuwei, with larger spacing and a different font. In 2021, Cai compiled two further collections of Chen's writings, titled respectively Chen Dingshan's Literary Works (陈定山文存) and Chen Dingshan on Art (陈定山谈艺录). The former provides anecdotes (excluding those already published in the Chun Shen series) as well as dramas, poems, and biographical texts. The latter, meanwhile, expands from the 1969 publication Dingshan's Seven Essays on Painting (定山论画七种) and includes 56 essays compiled from various sources.

== Analysis ==
Analyzing Chen's Taiwanese publications, Huang describes him as drawing from the story-telling traditions of the Ming and Qing dynasties, thereby transplanting these styles to Taiwan. At the same time, he expanded the approach known as notebook writing to reach mass audiences. While in Taiwan, Chen wrote regularly in the mornings, allotting a time between 7:00 and 11:00 a.m. He wrote quickly, composing up to 1,500 words in an hour.

Stylistically, the literary critic Zhang Jiongjiu describes Chen as the last heir of the Mandarin Ducks and Butterflies school, continuing the styles of pre-war China. Huang writes that, after moving to Taiwan, Chen underwent a process of deterritorialization and reterritorialization through which he sought to renovate old styles in new contexts. At the same time, he retained the vernacularized form of classical Chinese that had been used in Shanghai's tabloids, even as vernacular Chinese was dominant in mainstream literature.

== Works cited ==
- Cai Dengshan (蔡登山) (22 December 2021). 我与定公的一段书缘 [My Relationship with Dingshan through Books]. Shenzhen Special Zone Daily (in Chinese). Archived from the original on 9 November 2024 – via Sina.com.
- Nicole Huang (黃心村) (June 2014). 舊聞新語話春申：陳定山的上海與台北 [Travels of Minor Narratives: Chen Dingshan's Shanghai and Taipei] (PDF). Journal of Taiwanese Literature (in Chinese) (24): 1–30. Archived from the original (PDF) on 14 April 2021.
- Lean, Eugenia (2020). Vernacular Industrialism in China: Local Innovation and Translated Technologies in the Making of a Cosmetics Empire, 1900–1940. New York: Columbia University Press. doi:10.7312/lean19348-003. ISBN 978-0-231-55033-8.
- Liu Jiacheng (劉嘉成) (9 September 1998). 陳定山 [Chen Dingshan]. Encyclopedia of Taiwan (in Chinese). National Museum of History. Archived from the original on 9 May 2021.
- Sung, Doris (2024). Women of Chinese Modern Art: Gender and Reforming Traditions in National and Global Spheres, 1900s–1930s. Berlin: De Gruyter Oldenbourg. doi:10.1515/9783110798920-008. ISBN 978-3-11-079851-7.
- Zhao, Yufei (30 June 2019). 陳小翠年譜 [A Chronology of Chen Xiaocui]. Ci Xue 词学 (1): 369–98.
