= Biographies of Lian Po and Lin Xiangru (Huang Tingjian calligraphy) =

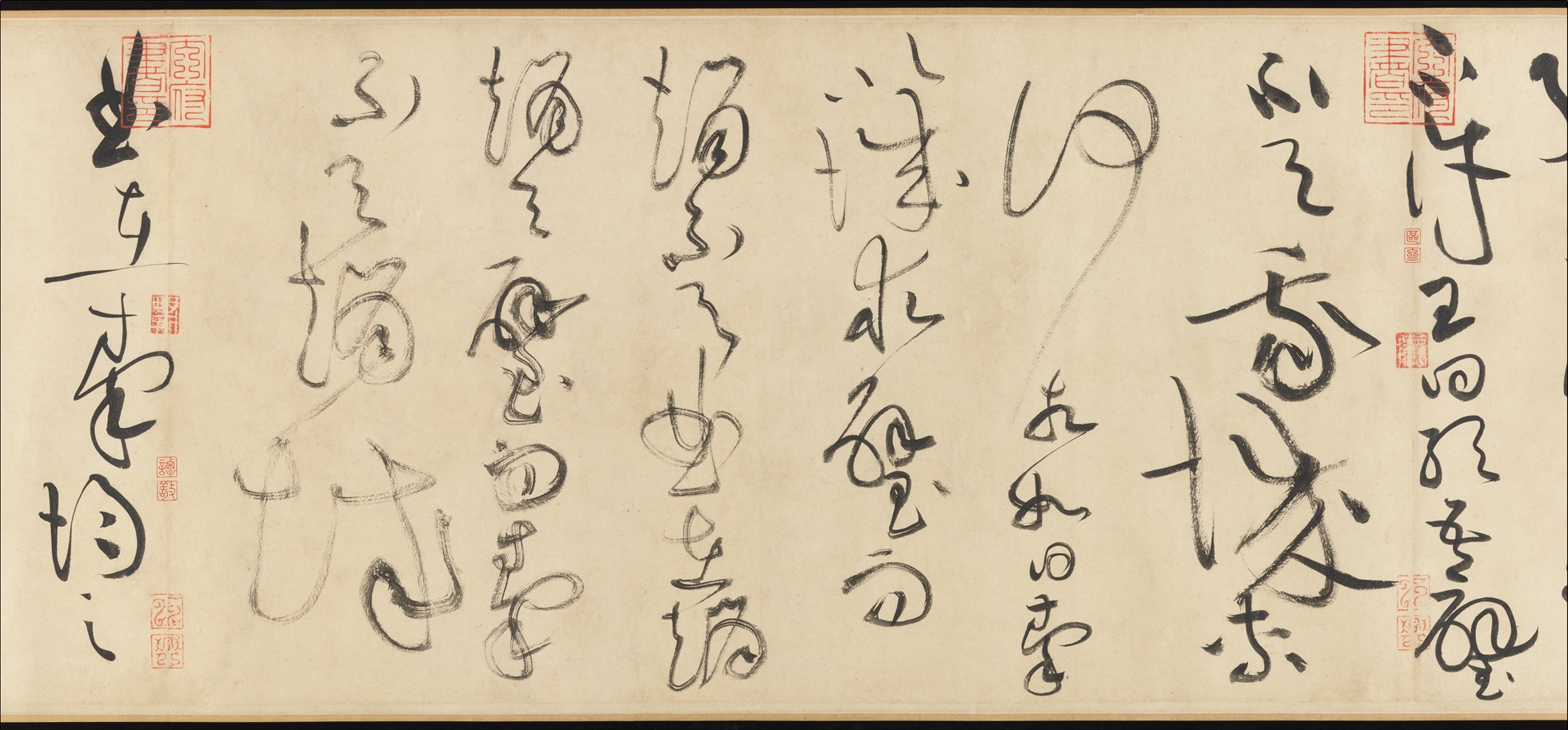
Biographies of Lian Po and Lin Xiangru. Calligraphy by Huang Tingjian

This grass-style Chinese calligraphy titled Biographies of Lian Po and Lin Xiangru was written by the famous calligrapher Huang Tingjian (1045–1105) in the Northern Song dynasty (960–1127). The overall handscroll is 34.3 centimetres (13.5 in) in height and 2,178.4 centimetres (71.47 ft) in length and contains 652 identifiable Chinese characters. The manuscript was originally collected by New York art collector John M. Crawford Jr. (1909–1988), and currently collected by the New York Metropolitan Museum of Art.

The words of the handscroll are taken from Chapter 81 of Records of the Grand Historian, written about a thousand years earlier, which describes the conflict between the Zhao historical figures Lian Po and Lin Xiangru. The text is edited to end at a key point, closing with Lin's words,“[When] two tigers fight, one must perish. I behave as I do because I put our country’s fate before private feuds.”, seen as politically significant in the artist's own time.
