= Dingshan Temple =

Buddhist temple in Nanjing, China

Dingshan Temple (Chinese: 定山寺; pinyin: Dìngshān Sì) is a Buddhist temple, located at the bottom of The Lions in the east of Pearl Spring, in Pukou, Nanjing, Jiangsu province, China. It is as famous as the Qixia Temple.

== Legend ==
In ancient China, emperor Wu of Liang believed in Buddhism, so he invited Dharma to preach Buddhism in Jinling, the capital of Liang dynasty and they had a talk. The emperor considered himself as a benevolent one with donations of money and land to temples. But Dharma didn't agree with the emperor Wu of Liang and he left for Jiangbei without a word. The emperor ordered servants to pursue him immediately. When noticed being chased, Dharma folded a reed and he took it across the Yangtze River. The Dharma went to Dingshan Temple to study Buddhism and left many historical sites. Dharma's stay in Dingshan Temple made the temple historically important.

== History ==
- In China Liang dynasty, about 503 BC, the emperor Wu of Liang believed in Buddhism, and he commanded to build a temple for a venerable Buddhism master, Fa Ding. In memory of the master, the emperor Wu named it after Dingshan Temple.
- Dingshan Temple had a good reputation in history. There were many people going there to pray. It was famous until Ming dynasty.
- With the alternation of the dynasties and out of repair, Dingshan Temple was ruined by mountain torrents in 1954.

== Reconstruction ==
- In 2002, the local government was inclined to reconstruct Dingshan Temple and did some preparations.
- In 2005, the proposal was approved.
- In 2007, a team of archaeologists from Nanjing Museum found the halls of temple sites of Song dynasty. According to the historical data, under it buried Dingshan Temple. In the same year, the reconstruction of Dingshan Temple was put on agenda.
- In 2011, the reconstruction of Dingshan Temple formally started.

== See also ==
- Qixia Temple

== Notes ==
- The Lions in has a different meaning of The Lions, located in the North Shore Mountains north of Vancouver, British Columbia, Canada.
- Pearl Spring has a different meaning of Pearl Spring, in Jinan, Shandong province.
