= Dingshan Bridge =

Dingshan Bridge 鼎山长江大桥
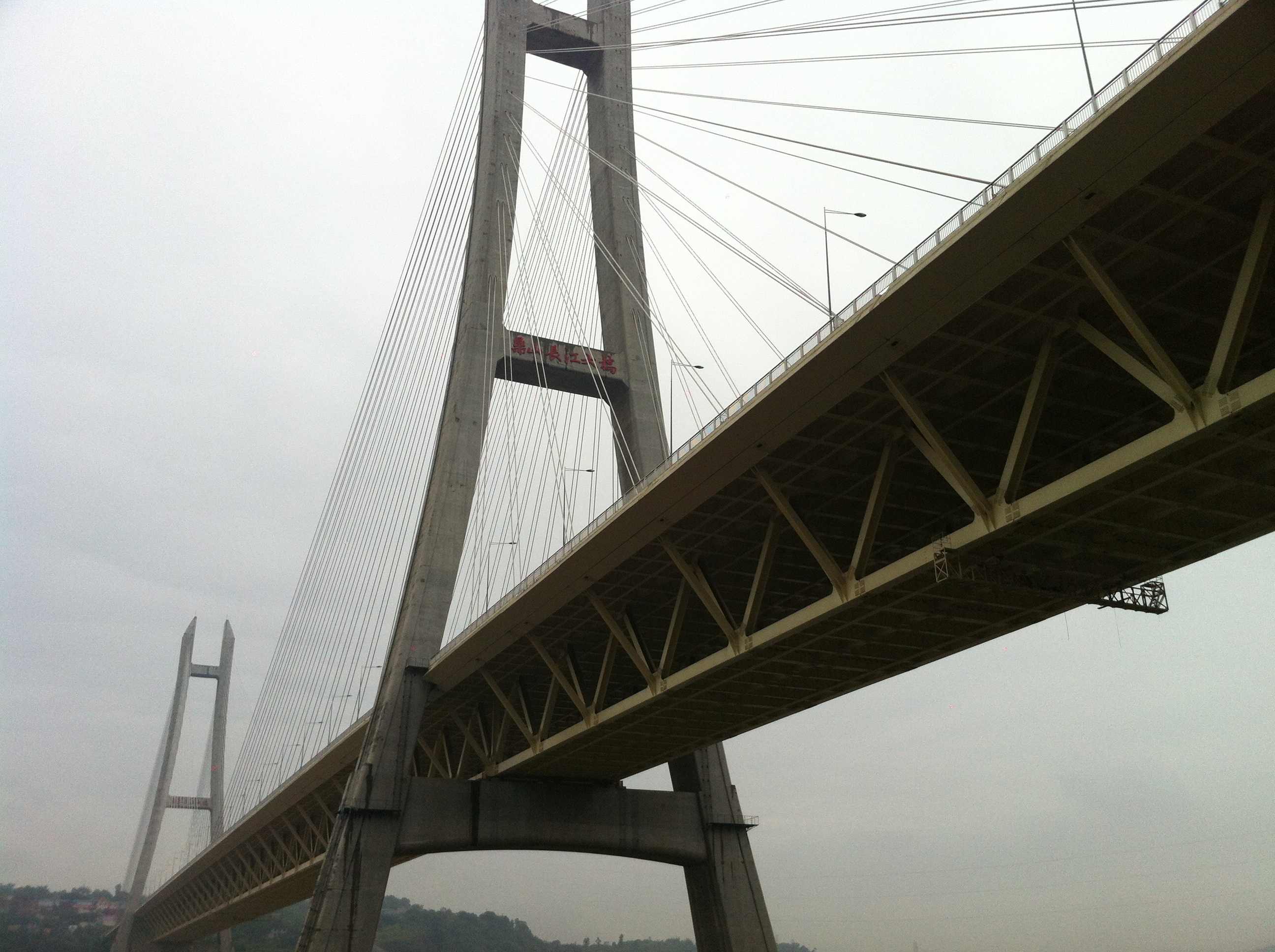
- Dingshan Bridge in July 2015
- Coordinates: 29.274743°N 106.287242°E
- Carries: China National Highway 212; Line 5, Chongqing Rail Transit
- Crosses: Yangtze River
- Locale: Chongqing, China

Characteristics
- Design: Cable-stayed
- Total length: 897 metres (2,943 ft)
- Longest span: 464 metres (1,522 ft)

History
- Opened: 2013

Location
- Interactive map of Dingshan Bridge

The Dingshan Bridge is a cable-stayed bridge which crosses the Yangtze River in Chongqing, China. Completed in 2013, it has a main span of 464 metres (1,522 ft). The bridge carries 6 lanes of road traffic of China National Highway 212 on the upper deck and Line 5, Chongqing Rail Transit between the Jiangjin District south of the Yangtze River and the Jiulongpo District to the north.

== See also ==
- List of longest cable-stayed bridge spans
- Yangtze River bridges and tunnels
