= Ziyoutan =

Chinese newspaper supplement (1911–1935)

Ziyoutan (Chinese: 自由談; lit. 'random talk' or 'free talk') was a literary supplement to the Shanghai newspaper Shen Bao published from 1911 to 1935.

== History ==
In 1911, Xi Zipei, the editor of the popular Shanghai newspaper Shen Bao, invited his friend and fellow journalist Wang Dungen (王鈍根) to establish a literary supplement for the newspaper. Debuting in August of that year, the supplement was dubbed Ziyoutan (自由談; 'random talk' or 'free talk').Shen Bao intended for the supplement to enter into the growing market for entertainment-based periodicals. Generally located at the back of the newspaper, literary supplements became a common feature for Chinese newspapers during the early-20th century, and gave a space for prominent writers to share their work and discourse with one another. Xi and Tong Ailou (童愛樓), an obscure writer of popular fiction, served as the supplement's first editors.

In September 1913, while still working for Shen Bao, Wang began publishing a journal titled Liberty Magazine (自由談; Zìyóu zázhì), claiming that he had received too many "brilliant specimens of writing" to include within the supplement alone. Much of Liberty Magazine consisted of republications from Ziyoutan, with about half of the entries credited to Xi and Tong. This magazine proved popular with readers, and after two issues Wang renamed it to Pastime Magazine (遊戲雜誌; Youxi zazhi). He soon left Shen Bao to focus on the journal full time.

After Wang left Shen Bao, his friend Chen Diexian took over as the editor of the Ziyoutan supplement. Chen hired one of his sons, Chen Xiaodie, as a staff writer, and published contributions from another son, Chen Cidie. Chen later left the magazine to focus on his business ventures, and was replaced with Zhou Shoujuan, a novelist and bonsai expert.

In December 1932, Shen Bao manager Shi Liangcai revamped the supplement, replacing Zhou with the young editor Li Liewen. Shi was impressed by Li's literary knowledge and his lack of previous political involvement. Under Li's editorship, the supplement moved away from the 'Mandarin Duck and Butterfly' (a style of Chinese genre fiction) which had previously defined it, gaining it significant acclaim within the literary world and increasing its readership. The supplement ran until October 1935, when it was discontinued.
