= Lu Xiaoman =

Chinese artist and wife of Xu Zhimo (1903–1965)

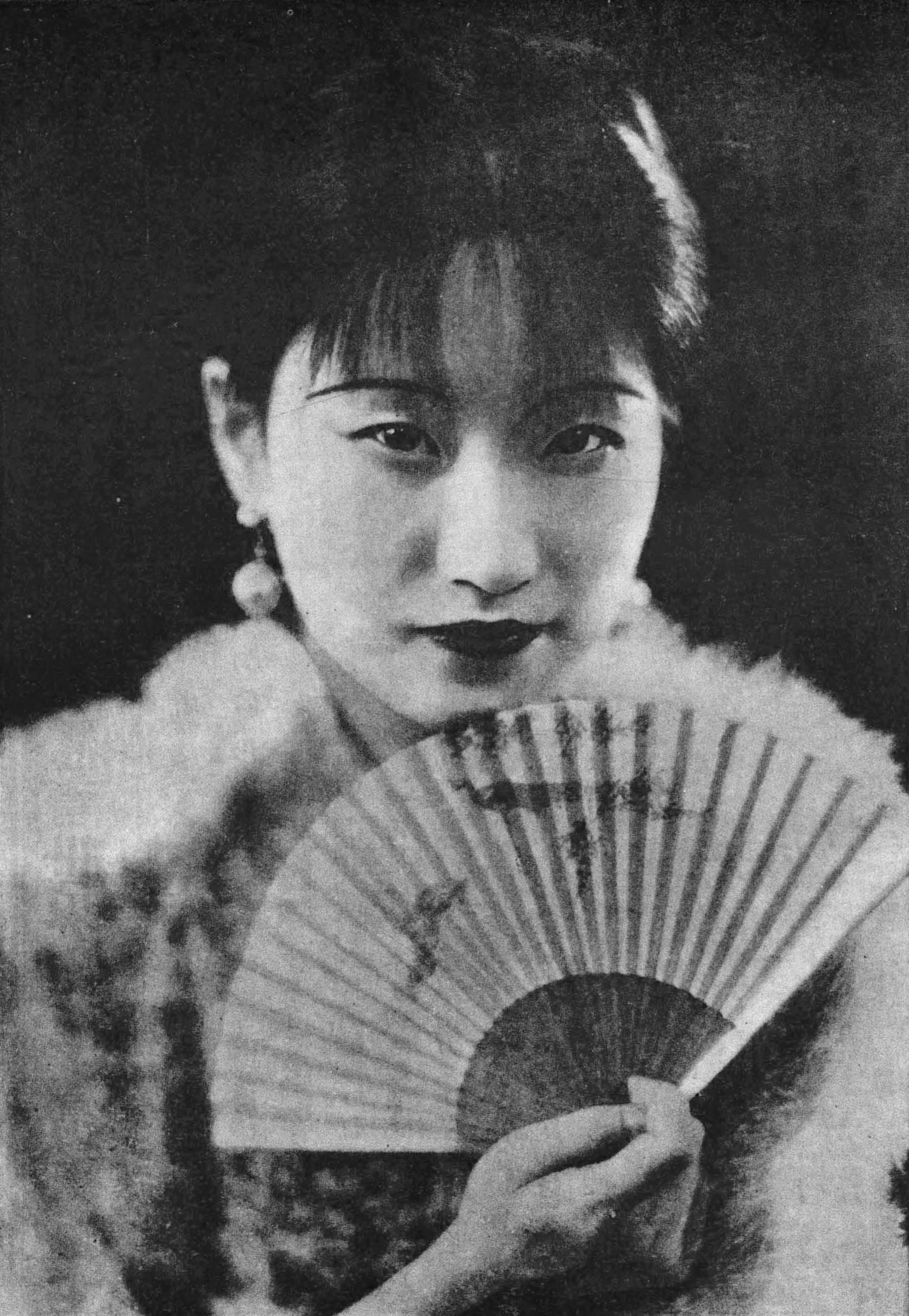
Lu Xiaoman

Lu Xiaoman (Chinese: 陆小曼; pinyin: Lù Xiǎomàn; 7 November 1903 – 3 April 1965) was a beloved cultural figure in 20th century Chinese history. She was given the name of Mei (眉, eyebrow, a metaphor for feminine beauty in Chinese), but later changed her name to Xiaoman. Although she was well known for her very passionate and public relationship with Xu Zhimo, she was a celebrated painter, writer, singer, and actor. She studied under painters such as Liu Haisu, Chen Banding (陈半丁), and He Tianjian.

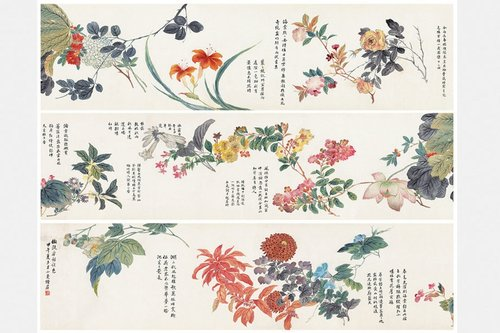
paintings

As an artist, she specialized in flowers, birds, and light ink landscapes (danmo shanshui) on long Chinese scrolls. She was also known to write poetry, prose, and fiction, but her writings were never published. Nevertheless, her appreciation for poetry inspired her to create a series of ink paintings in honor of the Tang poet Du Fu, which are displayed at his commemorative historical site. Lu Xiaoman was also a singer, and she debuted on stage after receiving training in the renowned Peking Opera (Jingju). She quickly gained attention from bachelors of wealthy, famous families after her first performance, which led to her rise in fame. In the 1950s and 60's, she worked as a paid artist at the Shanghai Academy of Chinese Painting, but only to produce works for the academy. Even so, she was able to create and successfully sell paintings at Duoyun Zhai apart from her obligations to the academy.

== Early life and education ==
Lu was born in Shanghai in 1903 and raised in Changzhou, Jiangsu province.

She was educated in Beijing Women's Normal Primary (北京女子师范大学附属小学) when she was 7 years old. She attended Beijing Girls' Junior High (北京女中) at the age of 9 and finished at 14. She later attended Beijing Sacred Heart School (北京圣心学堂). She also studied in France and was fluent in English and French by the age of 18. Chen Yi, the mayor of Shanghai, gave her a position in the Shanghai Institute of Culture and History after learning that she had remained in the city after the establishment of the People's Republic in 1949.

== Career and personal life ==
She was employed by Gu Weijun, the Minister of Foreign Affairs of the Northern Government, as a Trade Interpreter. In 1922, she married Wang Geng (王赓), but they divorced soon after their marriage. After that, she was in a relationship with Xu Zhimo, which caused a great stir as two divorcees getting married was considered radical even among China's progressives. In 1931, Xu died in a plane crash.

== Character evaluation ==
"Lu Xiaoman was a Prometheus who shook the Chinese literary and artistic circles in the 1920s." (Comments by Yu Dafu)

"Lu Xiaoman is a sight that must be seen." (Comments by Hu Shi)

"Her eyes are also talking, and the secret of her heart is reflected in her eyes." (Comments by Xu Zhimo)
