= Concubinage in China =

Concubinage in China traditionally resembled marriage in that concubines were recognized sexual partners of a man and were expected to bear children for him. Unofficial concubines (Chinese: 婢妾; pinyin: bì qiè) were of lower status, and their children were considered illegitimate. The English term concubine is also used for what the Chinese refer to as pínfēi (嬪妃), or "consorts of emperors", an official position often carrying a very high rank. The practice of concubinage in China was outlawed when the Chinese Communist Party came to power in 1949.

== History ==
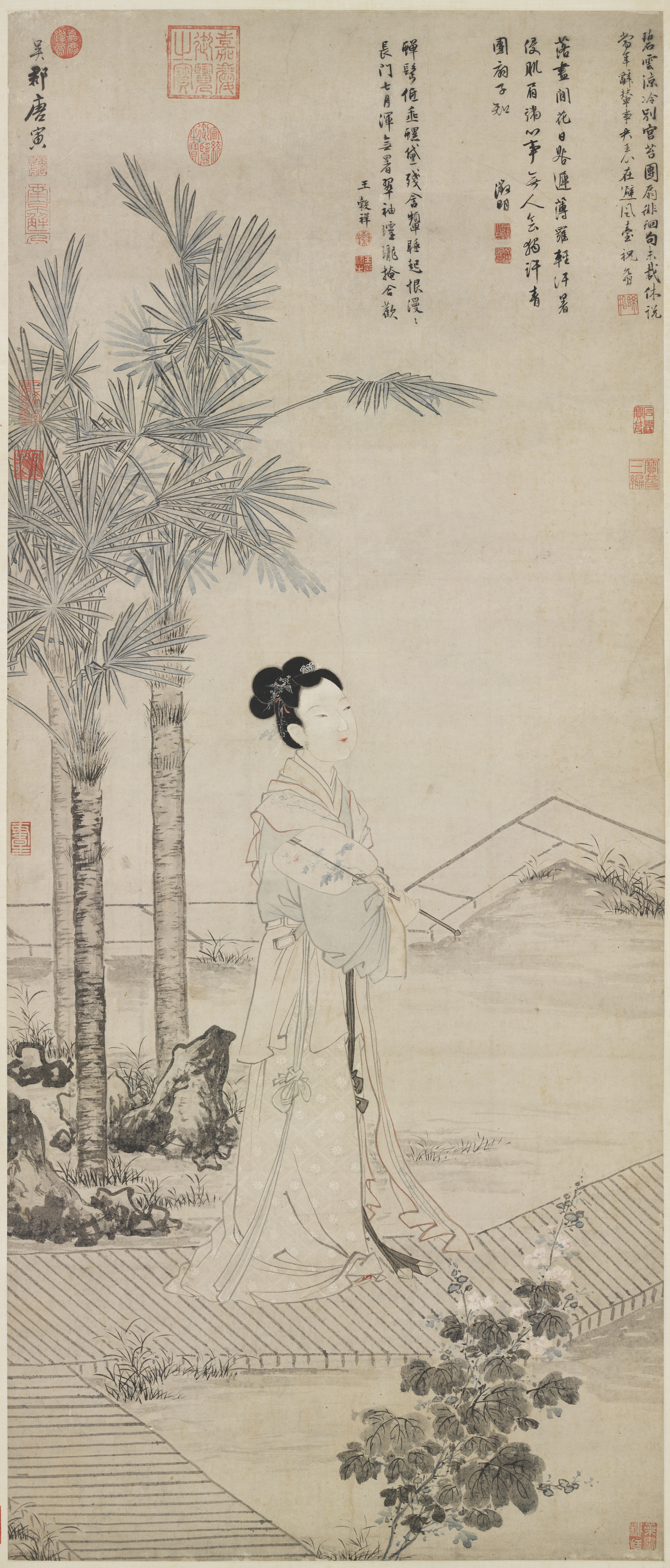
16th-century painting of Ban Jieyu (c. 48 BCE – c. 2 BCE), poet and concubine to Emperor Cheng of the Han dynasty.

In premodern China it was illegal and socially disreputable for a man to have more than one wife at a time, but it was acceptable to have concubines. From the earliest times wealthy men purchased concubines and added them to their household in addition to their wife. The purchase of a concubine was similar to the purchase of a servant or slave, yet concubines had a higher social status.

In the earliest times a man could have as many concubines as he could afford to purchase. From the Eastern Han period (AD 25–220) onward, the number of concubines a man could have was limited by law. The higher rank and the more noble identity a man possessed, the more concubines he was permitted to have. A concubine's treatment and situation were variable and was influenced by the social status of the male to whom she was attached, as well as the attitude of his wife. In the Book of Rites chapter on "The Pattern of the Family" (Chinese: 內則) it says, "If there were betrothal rites, she became a wife; and if she went without these, a concubine." Wives brought a dowry to a relationship, but concubines did not. A concubinage relationship could be entered into without the ceremonies used in marriages, and neither remarriage nor a return to her natal home in widowhood were allowed to a concubine.

The position of the concubine was generally inferior to that of the wife. Although a concubine could produce heirs, her children would be inferior in social status to a wife's children, although they were of higher status than illegitimate children. The child of a concubine had to show filial duty to two women, their biological mother and their legal mother—the wife of their father. After the death of a concubine, her sons would make an offering to her, but these offerings were not continued by the concubine's grandsons, who made offerings only to their grandfather's wife.

There are early records of concubines allegedly being buried alive with their masters to "keep them company in the afterlife". Until the Song dynasty (960–1276), it was considered a serious breach of social ethics to promote a concubine to a wife.

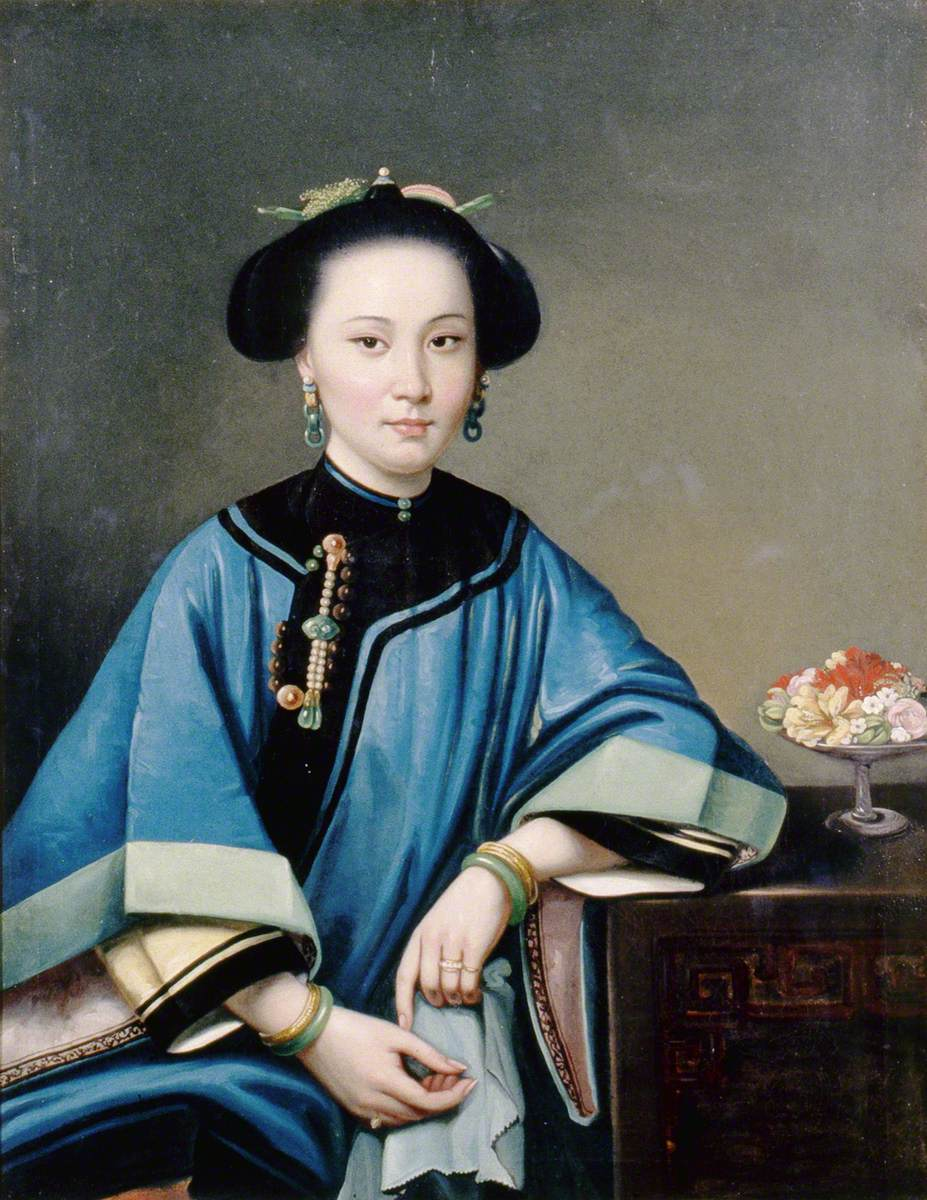
Portrait of a concubine, by Chinese painter Lam Qua, 1864

During the Qing dynasty (1644–1911), the status of concubines improved. It became permissible to promote a concubine to wife, if the original wife had died and the concubine was the mother of the only surviving sons. Moreover, the prohibition against forcing a widow to remarry was extended to widowed concubines. During this period tablets for concubine-mothers seem to have been more commonly placed in family ancestral altars, and genealogies of some lineages listed concubine-mothers. Many of the concubines of the emperor of the Qing dynasty were freeborn women from prominent families. Concubines of men of lower social status could be either freeborn or slave.

Imperial concubines, kept by emperors in the Forbidden City, had different ranks and were traditionally guarded by eunuchs to ensure that they could not be impregnated by anyone but the emperor. In Ming China (1368–1644) there was an official system to select concubines for the emperor. The age of the candidates ranged mainly from 14 to 16. Virtues, behavior, character, appearance and body condition were the selection criteria.

Despite the limitations imposed on Chinese concubines, there are several examples in history and literature of concubines who achieved great power and influence. Lady Yehenara, otherwise known as Empress Dowager Cixi, was arguably one of the most successful concubines in Chinese history. Cixi first entered the court as a concubine to Xianfeng Emperor and gave birth to his only surviving son, who later became Tongzhi Emperor. She eventually became the de facto ruler of Qing China for 47 years after her husband's death.

An examination of concubinage features in one of the Four Great Classical Novels, Dream of the Red Chamber (believed to be a semi-autobiographical account of author Cao Xueqin's family life). Three generations of the Jia family are supported by one notable concubine of the emperor, Jia Yuanchun, the full elder sister of the male protagonist Jia Baoyu. In contrast, their younger half-siblings by concubine Zhao, Jia Tanchun and Jia Huan, develop distorted personalities because they are the children of a concubine.

The domestic intrigues of wives, concubines, and harems are emphasized in 21st-century novels written for female readers and set in ancient times. In this genre, the alliances and adversarial relationships between the women in the back courtyard are often given an equal amount of attention as any romantic relationship with the male characters. As a plot element, the children of concubines are depicted with a status much inferior to that in actual history. The zhai dou (simplified Chinese: 宅斗; traditional Chinese: 宅鬥; lit. 'residential intrigue') and gong dou (宫斗; 宮鬥; 'harem intrigue') genres show concubines and wives, as well as their children, scheming secretly to gain power. Empresses in the Palace, a gong dou type novel and TV drama, has had great success in 21st-century China.

Hong Kong officially abolished the Great Qing Legal Code in 1971, thereby making concubinage illegal. Casino magnate Stanley Ho of Macau took his "second wife" as his official concubine in 1957, while his "third and fourth wives" retain no official status.

== Social status ==
Women in concubinage (妾) were treated as inferior, and expected to be subservient to any wife under traditional Chinese marriage (if there was one). The women were not wedded in a whole formal ceremony, had less right in the relationship, and could be divorced arbitrarily. They generally came from lower social status or were bought as slaves. Women who had eloped may have also become concubines since a formal wedding requires her parents' participation.

The number of concubines was sometime regulated, which differs according to the men's rank. In ancient China, men of higher social status often supported several concubines, and Chinese emperors almost always had dozens of, even hundreds of royal concubines.

Despite the limitations imposed on ancient Chinese concubines, history and literature have examples of concubines achieving great power and influence. For example, in one of the Four Great Classical Novels of China, The Dream of the Red Chamber (believed to be a semi-autobiographical account of author Cao Xueqin's own family life), three generations of the Jia family are supported by one favorite concubine of the emperor.

Imperial concubines, kept by emperors in the Forbidden City, were traditionally guarded by eunuchs to ensure that they could not be impregnated by anyone but the emperor. Lady Yehenara, otherwise known as Empress Dowager Cixi, was arguably one of the most successful concubines in China's history. Cixi first entered the court as a concubine to the Xianfeng Emperor and gave birth to an illegitimate male heir, who would become the Tongzhi Emperor. The emperor passed over many legitimate male heirs and named Cixi's son the crown prince. She would eventually become the de facto ruler of the Manchu Qing Dynasty in China for 47 years after her son's death.

A somewhat different form of it is the so-called "two primary wives" (兩頭大). Traditionally, a married woman is expected to live with her husband's family. When the husband has to live away from his family, however, she has to stay with her in-laws and take care of them. A man who thus suffers chronic separation from his wife, such as a traveling merchant, may "marry" another woman where he lives and set up a separate household with her. Due to the geographical separation, the second woman often regards herself as a full wife for all practical matters, yet legally this marriage is not recognized, and she is treated as a concubine. In China specifically, in cases where the primary wife fails to have sons to preserve the male lineage, i.e. family name, a secondary wife is allowed by law.

Although modern Chinese law explicitly prohibits polygamy, there has been a recent surge of polygamy in mainland China. Since the opening of China's borders in the 1970s, businessmen from Hong Kong and Taiwan started setting up "secondary wives" (二奶, er nai) in the Mainland. Since then the practice has spread to local affluent men. Someone considered as 二奶 would receive more privileges than another woman regarded as 小三 (xiao san), a term reserved for a mere mistress rather than a role more akin to second wife or concubine. Although this practice is condemned throughout society many men still have 二奶 and 小三, which can cause conflict and trauma, just as it would in western countries.

Some juries in China consider married people who leave home to live with their lovers to have committed bigamy.

However most law cases filed were before 2000, and as of 2014 the situation does not really differ from that in western countries. People will not get prosecuted for "bigamy" for out-of-marriage relationships as long as they do not register another marriage, but might be required to cede more possessions in divorce cases involving a former wife.
