= Murder of Wang Lianying =

1920 murder in Shanghai, China

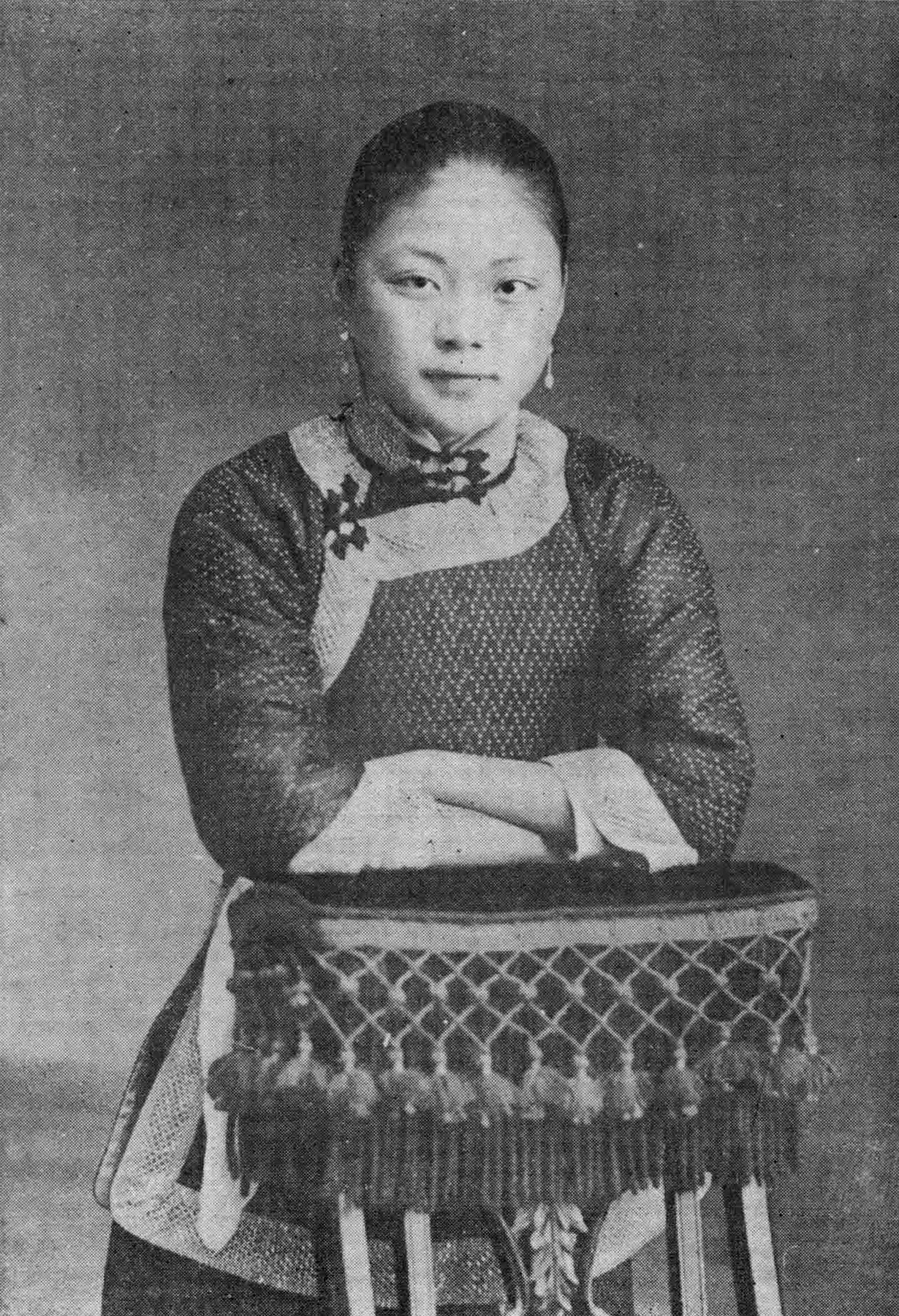
Wang Lianying, a Shanghai courtesan, was killed on 9 June 1920.

Wang Lianying (Note: Traditional Chinese: 王蓮英; simplified Chinese: 王莲英; pinyin: Wáng Liányīng; Wade–Giles: Wang^{2} Lien^{2}-ying^{1}; also romanized as Lee Ying (The North-China Herald, 1920-08-14). According to Manchu custom, she is referred here only by her given name.) was a Chinese courtesan who was killed by Yan Ruisheng (Note: Traditional Chinese: 閻瑞生; simplified Chinese: 阎瑞生; pinyin: Yán Ruìshēng; Wade–Giles: Yen^{2} Jui^{4}-sheng^{1}; The North-China Herald, covering his hearing, identified him as having the aliases Nyien Zia-sung, Nyien Loe-wong, and Nyien Lau-sz (The North-China Herald, 1920-08-14).) and his accomplices on 9 June 1920 near Shanghai in the Republic of China. Twenty-year-old Lianying had worked in Shanghai, known as the "Brothel of Asia", since 1916, gaining the title "Prime Minister of Flower Country" in 1917. Yan, meanwhile, was a university-educated youth deeply in debt due to expensive habits and frequent gambling.

Seeking to escape his debt, Yan decided to rob Lianying, who was known to adorn herself with expensive jewellery. After several days gaining her trust, Yan convinced her to join him on a drive through the Shanghai countryside. On the trip, the pair – accompanied by Wu Chunfang and Fang Rishan – stopped in a wheat field. The three men drugged Lianying with chloroform, strangled her, and dumped her body in an isolated place. Lianying's disappearance was noted later that night, and her body was discovered on 15 June. Investigators issued an arrest warrant for Yan four days later, and after several weeks he was arrested at the Xuzhou railway station; based on the content of Yan's confession, Wu was soon detained as well. Fang had escaped, but Yan and Wu were tried, convicted, and executed.

The killing of a famous courtesan by an educated man captured the imagination of Shanghai society. Newspaper coverage was extensive and lasted for months. By the end of July 1920, multiple books on Lianying and her killer had been published. Five theatre troupes staged performances based on the murder by the end of 1921, with a Pathé Orient pressing of arias from one Peking opera finding great commercial success. The case was adapted to film in 1921, with another retelling made in Hong Kong in 1938.

== Background ==
Shanghai, a major port and the gateway to the Yangtze Valley, has long been a commercial hub and a crossroads of Western and Eastern cultures. In the mid-19th century, as China was experiencing extensive internal conflicts, the city saw an influx of migrants. Meanwhile, with its designation as a treaty port, Shanghai developed a sizeable expatriate community. The city continued to grow rapidly through the 1890s and 1900s, with new factories and storefronts opening regularly. It was divided into three administrations: the Chinese city proper, the French Concession, and the predominantly British Shanghai International Settlement. Among contemporary Chinese, it had a reputation for modernity and cosmopolitanism, being a major centre of literary, filmic, and musical production.

In China, the practice of prostitution has historically been permitted, and at times licensed and taxed. Shanghai in particular became known as a centre of sex work and human trafficking. By the 1900s, it had gained the moniker the "Brothel of Asia"; in 1915 some 9,700 women were active as prostitutes in the International Settlement. These women, known as "flowers" (花) in Chinese and sing-song girls in English, ranged from well-respected entertainers to street prostitutes. The greatest beauties were lauded in guidebooks and tabloids regularly covered the intricacies of the business. "Elections" of courtesans, wherein patrons assessed courtesans' singing prowess and beauty, were held sporadically from the 1860s through the 1910s. (Note: These elections, used to produce a "flower list" (花榜), initially drew from the language used by the imperial examination. After the 1911 Revolution, imperial titles were replaced with republican ones such as "President", "Vice-President", and "Prime Minister" (Hershatter 1999, pp. 165–167).)

== Biographies ==
=== Wang Lianying ===
Wang Lianying was born in Hangzhou, Zhejiang, to a Manchu commander in the Plain White Banner and his wife. Her father died during her childhood, and Lianying's mother married the teahouse owner Wang Changfa. The family was rendered destitute following the 1911 Revolution, and Lianying dropped out of the girls' school in which she was enrolled. She thereafter entered prostitution, gaining a reputation for her singing and her beauty. The tabloid The New World described her in a 1918 profile as highly literate and a scholar among women.

In 1916, Lianying arrived in Shanghai with a woman identified as her mother. (Note: At the time, Chinese courtesans would address brothel owners as "mother"; likewise, sources discussing courtesans tended not to specify whether the term was being used in its biological sense, an adoptive sense, or as an honorific (Hershatter 1999, p. 76).) She took residence with a popular courtesan, but after irreconcilable differences developed she left to establish her own brothel. She gained recognition following the 1917 courtesan election, winning fourth place and gaining the title "Prime Minister of Flower Country" (花國總理). (Note: This title has also been translated as "Premier of Flower Country" (Hershatter 1999, p. 158) and "Prime Minister of Flower Affairs" (He 2018, p. 189).) In the following years she worked with several other courtesans, including the prominent madame Xu Di. She gave birth to a daughter in 1919. By her twentieth birthday, Lianying was working at a brothel in Xiao Huayan, one of Shanghai's major courtesan hubs.

=== Yan Ruisheng ===
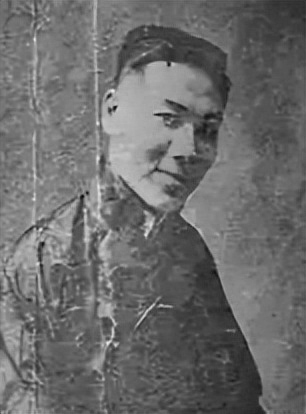
The perpetrator, Yan Ruisheng

Yan Ruisheng, the perpetrator of the killing, was a twenty-six-year-old man who lived in Qingpu with his widowed mother. The Yan family traced their roots to the Henan region. Yan was university educated, having enrolled at Aurora University at age sixteen. After completing his studies four years later, Yan spent time in Beijing and Hong Kong. He was reported to speak English and French fluently; he had also learned to drive, a rare skill at the time. During his trial, he identified as a Roman Catholic.

Yan worked variously as a translator for the Franco-Chinese Mining Company and as a clerk for the French Tramway Company, both in Shanghai. He had also been married, though neighbours said that the couple had separated some time before the murder. By January 1920, Yan was unemployed. He was a man of expensive tastes, being known to frequent cinemas, bet on horse racing, and hire prostitutes. Even while unemployed, he did not stop gambling or frequenting courtesans, and thus fell deep into debt. As the Dragon Boat Festival was approaching, Yan was under increased pressure: according to industry custom, all debts to courtesans were expected to have been paid in full by the date of the festival.

== Murder ==
=== Planning ===
Seeking to escape his debt, Yan borrowed a diamond ring from Ti Hongguan (題紅館; 题红馆), his favourite courtesan. He pawned it for 600 yuan (equivalent to ¥58,000 in 2023), which he subsequently lost betting on horses at the Jiangwan Racecourse. Facing pressure to return the ring, he decided to rob a courtesan. (Note: It was not uncommon for Shanghainese courtesans to be robbed of their jewellery. Xu Di, with whom Lianying had previously worked, was also robbed in 1920. The case was widely covered in local media, which erroneously reported that she had killed herself after the fact (Hershatter 1999, p. 439).) As his target, he chose Lianying. Although Yan had never been a client of hers, she had a reputation for wearing expensive jewellery; a friend had also described her as wearing a diamond ring and luxurious clothing during one of their encounters.

Using calling cards borrowed from friends, Yan met Lianying on 4 and 7 June 1920; another attempt, on 5 June, received no response. During these interactions, Yan estimated that her diamond ring was worth 2,000 yuan (equivalent to ¥195,000 in 2023). He brought several friends, including Zhu Zhija (朱稚嘉) – the son of the wealthy merchant Zhu Baosan – to her house on 8 June for a gambling session, thereby establishing himself as a man with wealthy friends. At the end of their session, Yan invited her to join him for a mahjong game the following day. (Note: Werner (1920, p. 5) gives poker.) Having arranged to pick Lianying up at the home of Xiao Lin Daiyu (小林黛玉), (Note: Xiao ("Little") Lin Daiyu was the adoptive daughter of Lin Daiyu, a courtesan who had risen to prominence in Shanghai in the late 19th century. Her professional name was taken from a character in the novel Dream of the Red Chamber (Hershatter 1999, pp. 146–148, 159).) another courtesan, Yan subsequently asked to borrow Zhu's car.

On 9 June, Yan began to acquire the implements he needed for the murder. He purchased chloroform from the King Sing Dispensary, then hired his acquaintance Wu Chunfang (吳春芳; 吴春芳) as an accomplice. Promising to pay Wu 100 yuan (equivalent to ¥10,000 in 2023) for his assistance, and to allow him to keep any goods valued at a thousand yuan or greater, Yan sent him to purchase something with which to strangle Lianying. (Note: Some sources report a hemp rope, while others indicate a silk sash (Hershatter 1999, p. 159).) Yan travelled to Zhu's house to retrieve his car. After dismissing Zhu's chauffeur by giving him money for a shave and haircut, Yan met Wu at a teahouse. Wu brought with him a third man, Fang Rishan (方日珊), whom he retained to help in the robbery.

=== Robbery and murder ===
His accomplices in place, Yan attempted to find Lianying, but as she was not at Xiao Lin Daiyu's home he returned to the teahouse. Lianying arrived at the home of Xiao Lin Daiyu at approximately 6:30 p.m., adorned with numerous pieces of jewellery. Upon meeting her, Yan told Lianying that the mahjong game had been cancelled, and offered instead to take her for a drive through the Shanghai countryside. Initially hesitant, (Note: The tabloid The Crystal claimed that, at this point, Xiao Lin Daiyu urged Lianying not to go, fearing that Yan had evil intentions (Hershatter 1999, p. 160).) Lianying ultimately agreed to join him. They left Shanghai along No. 2 Hongqiao Road, with Yan driving, Lianying in the passenger seat, and Wu and Fang in the rear.

As dusk approached, Yan stopped the car amidst the fields outside Shanghai, ostensibly to light the headlamp. He retrieved the chloroform from the trunk and poured it over a cotton pad, which was used to smother Lianying. (Note: In his confession, Yan stated that Fang Rishan had been the one to smother Lianying (The North-China Herald, 1920-08-28, p. 574).) When she struggled and begged for her life, they added more until she fell unconscious. At this point, the men separated. Yan, seeing that a peasant was approaching, distracted him by offering a ride in the car. Wu and Fang stole Lianying's jewellery, then strangled her.

After Yan returned, Lianying's body was loaded into the car, with the intent of dumping it in a more isolated area. As Yan drove, Wu and Fang divided the stolen goods, distracting him long enough to hit a tree and damage the vehicle. When they reached a suitably isolated area, Yan stopped. At this point, Lianying was still breathing, and he thus instructed his accomplices to kill her while he returned the car. By the time he returned at midnight, having paid off the chauffeur to conceal the damage, the other men were gone. Lianying's body was left exposed to the elements, and Yan went to sleep at the home of Ti Hongguang.

=== Discovery and investigation ===
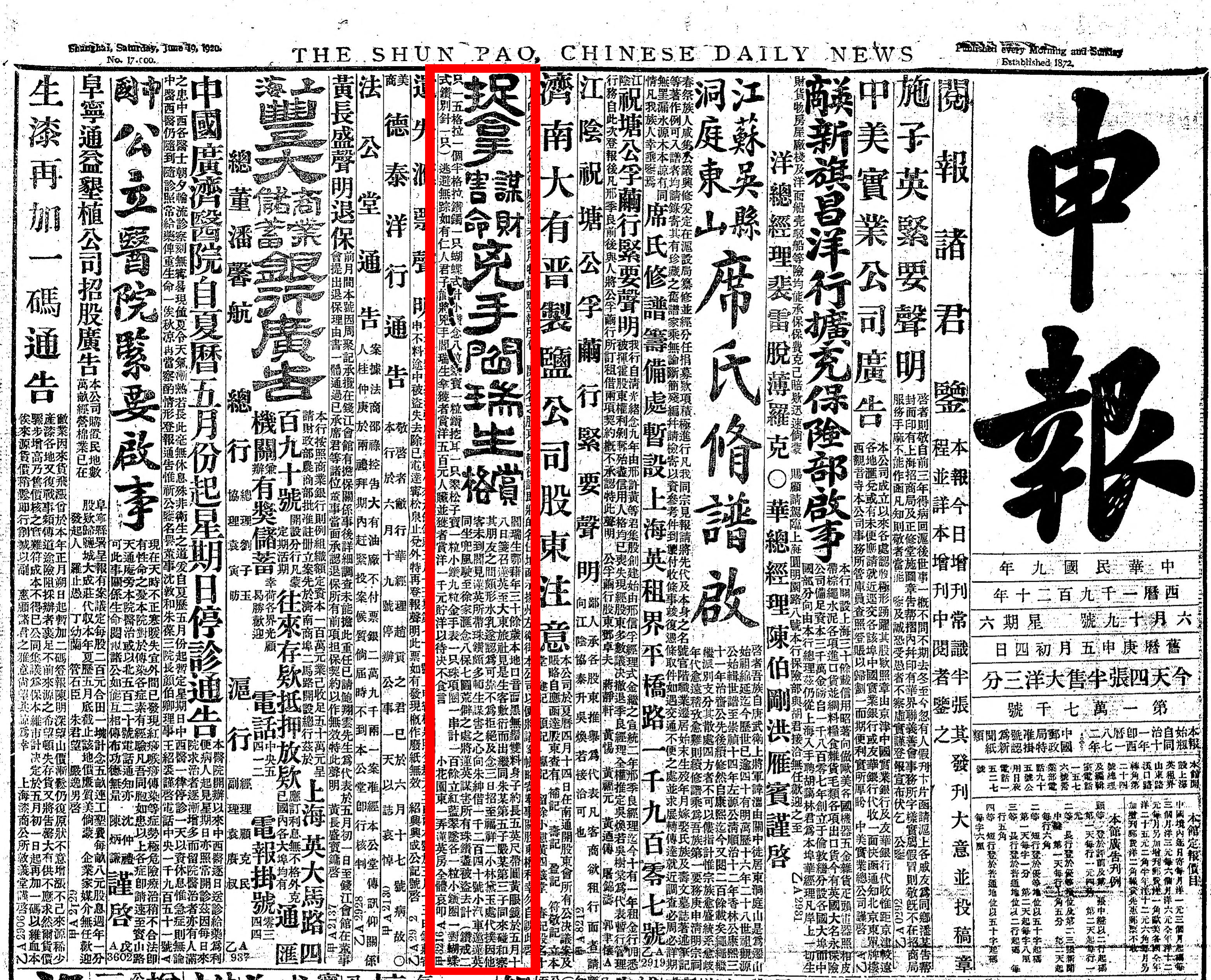
Front page of the Shen Bao, 19 June 1920, offering a reward for the capture of Yan Ruisheng

Later that night, Lianying's parents contacted Zhu to inquire about her; Zhu, assuming that the rendezvous had culminated in a sexual encounter, assured them that she would return soon and promised to look into the matter. After discovering the damage to his car on 10 June, Zhu became suspicious. He found Yan near the Tihong Pawnshop the following day, attempting to redeem Ti Hongguan's ring. When asked about Lianying's whereabouts, Yan left, claiming that he needed to make a telephone call. Later that evening, Yan asked Wu to bury Lianying's corpse, though this request went unheeded. On 12 June, the supplemental Little Eastern Times and the tabloid The Crystal published notices that Lianying had disappeared, and the following day a 500 yuan (equivalent to ¥49,000 in 2023) reward was posted for her safe return.

Lianying's badly decomposed body was discovered, alongside the murder weapon, by farmers in a wheat field in Hui Township on 15 June. Initial coverage, carried in newspapers such as the Shen Bao and the Min Kuo Jih Pao, incorrectly reported that the body belonged to a forty-year-old woman. These reports described the body as wearing a striped shirt and pants, with bare feet that showed no signs of binding. Further coverage, published the following day, identified the cause of death and suggested that the victim had been a prostitute. Lianying was identified in the press as the likely victim on 17 June, and the news that she had last been seen with Yan was released three days later.

As detectives with the International Settlement investigated the killing, Lianying's body was sent for identification. On 18 June, her corpse was identified based on a hair ornament. (Note: According to Hershatter (1999, p. 261), this was done by Lianying's step-father. Chen (2021) attributes it to the brothel madame.) Rewards were offered for information leading to the arrest of the murderer. (Note: A total reward of 1,000 yuan (equivalent to ¥97,000 in 2023) was offered. Some sources indicate that this money was made available by Lianying's parents, while others state that the reward came from the manager of her brothel house – half for information leading to the recovery of her body, and half for the recovery of the jewellery (Hershatter 1999, p. 161).) One gold pin was recovered from a local pawn shop. Local authorities, seeking to prevent further murders, ordered that no calls for courtesans be allowed after midnight. By 20 June 1920 investigators had interrogated all of Lianying's clients. Zhu was identified as potentially involved in the murder as early as 18 June, and his father's prominence drew the public's attention. (Note: Being his father's fifth son, Zhu was initially identified only as "Zhu No. 5" (He 2018, p. 228). The New World, in a 23 June editorial, used this opportunity to blame Zhu Baosan and other wealthy merchants for an ongoing rice shortage (He 2018, p. 229). The merchant later told the Shanghai Mixed Court that he had been receiving libelous letters, which he blamed on Lianying's family, as a result of the case (The North-China Herald, 1920-08-28, p. 575).)

An arrest warrant for Yan was issued on 19 June. He fled Shanghai, at first hiding with family, but later heading northward on the S.S. Yongchow bound for Qingdao. In July or early August, he was spotted at the Xuzhou railway station by a police officer who recognized him from a photograph. Yan was promptly arrested, and during interrogation he named his accomplices; Wu was located in Zhabei and detained several days later, while Fang escaped. Several pieces of Lianying's jewellery were recovered, including a diamond ring and a pearl necklace; a large diamond was reportedly recovered from Yan's mouth at the time of his arrest. Other pieces were never found.

=== Trial ===
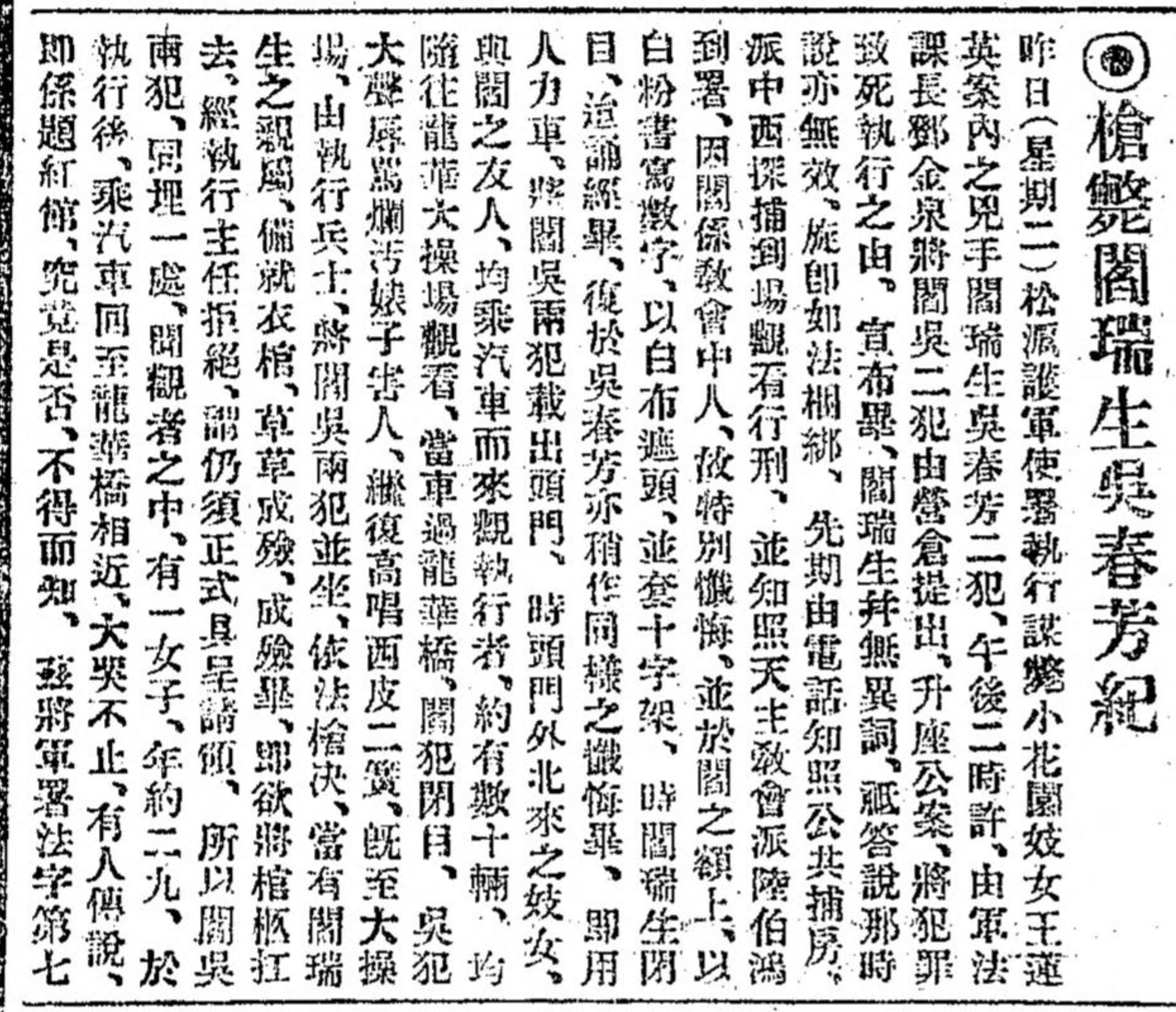
Announcement of the execution of Yan Ruisheng and Wu Chunfang, Shen Bao, 24 November 1920

On 9 August, Yan was sent back to Shanghai for trial, with his case to be heard by the Shanghai Mixed Court in the International Settlement. Represented by Lawrence Kentwell, he was read his charges by Assessor A. D. Blackburn and Magistrate Kuan. Wu was charged before the same court later that week. At the time, the Chinese courts were claiming jurisdiction and asking that Yan be extradited.

The case was prosecuted by R. C. Faithfull, with Kentwell and Mei Hua-Chuen representing Yan and R. S. Haskell and J. Em. Lemière representing Wu. The trial was attended by numerous members of Shanghai society, men and women alike. Some stood for hours to gain entrance, and when the courtroom became full, they lined the streets. Although the defence challenged the admissibility of the statements, both men confessed to the crimes. Yan indicated that the idea had come from American cinema, but insisted that he had not meant to kill Lianying. Further testimonies were provided by Zhu, his chauffeur, Ti Hongguan, and another courtesan. The verdict was returned on 26 August, with Yan found guilty of murder and Wu of armed robbery causing death.

The prisoners were transferred to Chinese custody, the Mixed Court not being able to impose capital punishment. Although the civilian court claimed jurisdiction, on 11 September the Chinese military court began its own trial, with Major Tang presiding. Unlike the earlier trial, which had been well-publicized, these proceedings were held in secret. Neither Yan nor Wu confessed to the military court, instead blaming the killing on each other and Fang. Later, they were also interrogated as to the extent of Zhu's involvement in the case, as well as the whereabouts of the remaining items. In early October, the men were found guilty and sentenced to death.

On 23 November, Yan and Wu were executed at the Western Battery of the Shanghai Garrison Command in Longhua. After a short Catholic service, held upon Yan's request, the men were brought to a courtyard, blindfolded, read their crimes, and shot. The execution was widely attended, including by Shanghai's courtesans. The artist Chen Dingshan later recalled that throngs of people had travelled for the execution, some riding atop the train. In an interview with The Paper, the historian Tang Weijie mentioned that more than ten thousand people attended the execution, including Yan's favoured courtesan, Ti Hongguan.

== Cultural impact ==
=== Press ===
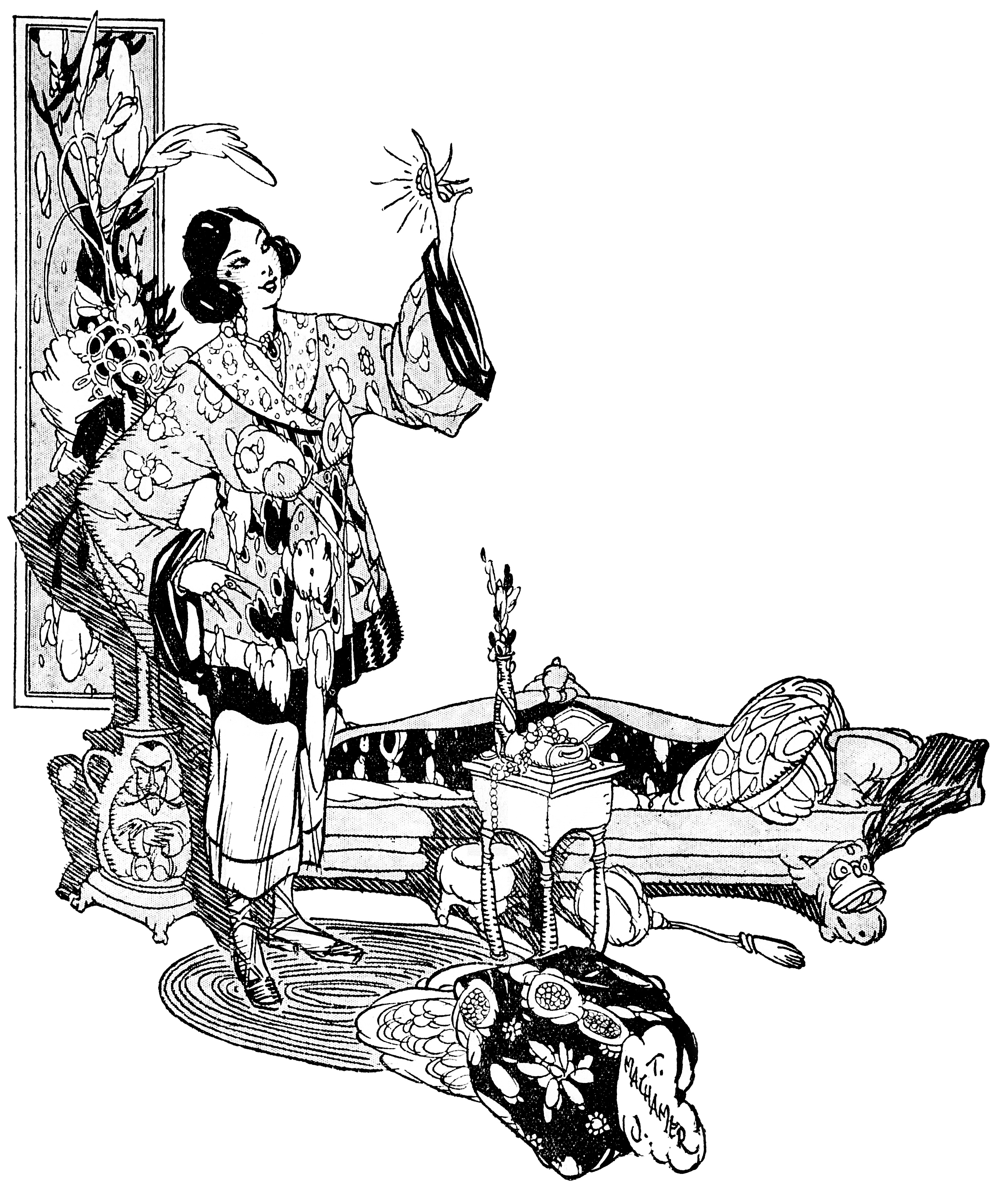
A caricature of Lianying by Jefferson Machamer, published in the New York Tribune (1920)

The killing of a famous courtesan by an educated youth immediately "scandalized and mesmerized the city's chattering classes". Newspaper coverage of the murder and trial was extensive, with tabloids focusing on the crime and larger papers prioritizing its aftermath. The Shen Bao published more than seventy articles on the court trial, with another hundred related to the case, in six months. After the trial, the 5,000-word verdict and accompanying confessions were serialized in the Xinwen Bao from 25 November to 8 December 1920. International newspapers also picked up the story. (Note: For example, Morris Werner, the Shanghai-based correspondent for the New York Tribune, reprinted Yan's confession in that publication's 3 October 1920 issue (Werner 1920)) Chen linked this widespread interest and coverage with the instability of the Warlord Era, suggesting that the trial provided a distraction from other issues. (Note: After the overthrow of the Qing dynasty in 1912, the Republic of China was led by President Yuan Shikai, whose increasingly dictatorial Beiyang government lost control of much of the country after his death in 1916. In the subsequent decade, China's provinces were led by various warlords who deployed their armies in bids to seize control of the country. A central government would not regain control over China until after the Northern Expedition of the late 1920s (Li 2012, pp. 481–482).)

Rumours spread rapidly, and many were published by contemporary tabloids. Prior to the identification of Lianying's body, The Crystal publicized baseless claims that she had fled a life of debt, was continuing her career in northern China, and her parents were aware of her location. During the investigation, the Little Eastern Times prematurely reported that Yan had been arrested and conflated him with a person named Zhong Ruisheng. It was also claimed that Zhu Baosan had spent 3,000 yuan (equivalent to ¥292,000 in 2023) to silence the press after his son came under media scrutiny. After Yan's execution, some claimed that he had not been killed, but rather that Zhu Zhija had provided his friend with a substitute.

Several publications highlighted the effect of the crime on Lianying's family while lamenting her death. Ten years after the murder, The Crystal published a retrospective; it narrated that Lianying's family had not buried her until 1929, and that her parents were raising her young daughter. Others examined the life of Yan Ruisheng. By mid-July there was a tendency for coverage to focus on the killer, who was framed not as a common criminal but as a "new man" who had been corrupted; the filmmaker Cheng Bugao later recalled that, due to Yan's background, the murder had been seen as "modern" and "fresh".

Critics decried the case as illustrating the erosion of public morality. Extensive discourse emerged over the influence of crime films on Chinese society, noting the case's similarities to such works. Some blamed the crime on the influence of greed, urging readers to abandon their ostentatious clothing and live simply. Others challenged the popularity of gambling. Discussing the case, a writer for the Shen Bao proclaimed that the darkness within the human heart had reached its peak, with savagery hidden behind a cultural veneer of modernity.

Although Lianying's occupation was recognized by contemporary commentators, few deemed it to have contributed to her murder. Most insinuations were only made obliquely. Nonetheless, there was a shift in discourses about prostitution. Major newspapers such as Shen Bao, following the New Culture Movement and Li Dazhao's arguments for abolishing prostitution, voiced concerns about the practice and its place in Chinese society. Tabloids framed Lianying sympathetically and supported the continued practice of courtesanship. In the 1920s, authorities in the International Settlement closed one-fifth of the area's brothels using a lottery system, with the remainder eliminated by 1925; courtesan houses moved to the French Concession, where the practice remained permitted.

=== Literature ===
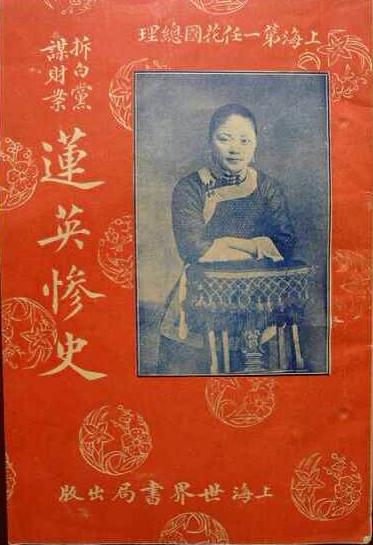
The Tragic History of Lianying (蓮英慘史), World Book Company, 1920

Several works of "news fiction" (新闻小说) based on the case were published by the end of the year. On 1 July 1920, the World Book Company made a call for stories about Lianying and her murder. Four days later, it published The Tragic History of Lianying (蓮英慘史), advertised as delivering an illustrated and comprehensive account of her life and career. By the end of the year, it had published two more books about the murder: A Secret History of Yan Ruisheng (阎瑞生秘史) and The Autobiography of Yan Ruisheng (閻瑞生自述記). The latter, published before Yan's sentencing, provided a first-person narrative that denied culpability and highlighted the difficulties of prison life. Some of these publications were re-issued multiple times, with The Tragic History of Lianying known to have been reprinted as late as 1925.

Other publishers also capitalized on the murder. An Account of the Murder of Lianying, Prime Minister of Flower Country (花國總理蓮英被害記), first announced on 1 July, provided a narrative of Lianying's life that was framed through Confucian values such as filial piety. This fifty-eight-page booklet presented her as staying in prostitution only to support her family, and attributed her death to Yan feeling unrecognized for his contributions to her 1917 election. Two later books drew primarily from newspaper coverage but also included rumours: The Miserable History of Lianying (莲英痛史) and The Miserable History of Lianying, the Prime Minister of Flower Country (花国总理莲英惨史). The former contained several dream sequences, including one in which Lianying foresees her own death, while the latter included the trial verdict in its entirety.

Aside from such works, the literati of Shanghai produced an abundance of elegiac couplets praising Lianying's virtues, as well as various works of fiction. Surveying the newspaper coverage of the case, Jiang Xingpeng of Central China Normal University notes that one story had Lianying return to haunt a debtor, while another depicted her spirit in conversation with the deceased courtesan Lu Baoshen. Zhang Henshui's 1929 novel Two Stars in the Milky Way (银汉双星) referenced the case, with the female protagonist Li Yueying becoming uncomfortable upon realizing that the movie star Yang Yiyun has brought her to the murder location for a romantic tryst.

=== Theatre ===
In contemporary Shanghai, stage adaptations of salacious news stories were common. (Note: As examples of such "current affairs dramas" (時事戲), Cheng (2024, p. 51) provides The Death of Jiang Laowu (蔣老五殉情記, 1920), about the suicide of a famed courtesan; and Huang Huiru and Lu Genrong (黃慧如與陸根榮, 1928), a tragic love story.) Consequently, efforts were soon made to bring the murder to stage. In mid-September 1920, the Qianku Great World Theatre applied to the Shanghai Municipal Council for permission to perform its adaptation. This application was denied, and the Council issued an injunction against any stage adaptations. This injunction was lifted in November 1920, following the executions of Yan Ruisheng and Wu Chunfang.

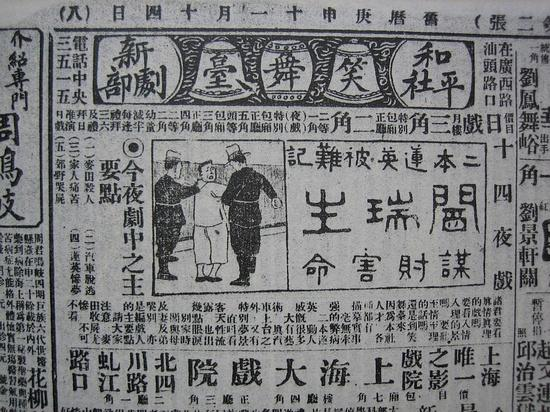
Advertisement for Lianying is Hard to Remember (蓮英被難記, 1920), one of several stage performances based on the murder

By then, the city's five major theatre companies had plans to adapt the story. The Qianku Great World Theatre brought its adaptation to the stage on 25 November 1920. (Note: Such shows were retitled over the course of their runs. He (2018, p. 245) notes that the Laughter Stage launched its show under the title Lianying's Calamity (莲英劫), then later took the titles Lianying (莲英), and Yan Ruisheng Kills for Profit (阎瑞生谋财害命). Cheng (2024, p. 54), meanwhile, notes that Peking opera performances were known variously as The Trials of Lianying (蓮英刦), Lianying is Hard to Remember (蓮英被難記), Yan Ruisheng (閻瑞生), Shooting Yan Ruisheng (鎗斃閻瑞生), and Yan Ruisheng Murders Lianying (閻瑞生謀害蓮英).) Starring Fen Juhua as Lianying and Han Jinkui as Yan, it retold the events in three acts, with one act performed per day. It interspersed depictions of the murder and hunt with dream sequences in which Lianying's ghost visits her lover before confronting her killers at Senluo Temple.

Also on 25 November 1920, the Laughter Stage troupe led by Zheng Zhengqiu launched a "civilized drama" version of the story. Advertisements emphasized the verisimilitude of the performance, touting extensive research that included attendance at court sessions. Stages were decorated to simulate the wheat field, courtroom, and railway station where key events occurred, and cast members spoke different dialects depending on their characters' place of origin. Performances of the adaptation, which starred Mao Yunke as Lianying and Zhao Ruquan as Yan, continued through January 1921. Special showings featuring Lianying's mother and her sweetheart Yang Xigui were advertised as raising funds for the family.

Shortly afterwards, Peking opera troupes began presenting their own takes on the story. One troupe, the Great Stage, premiered its adaptation on 27 November 1920. For this run, which starred Zhang Wenyan and Lin Shusen, it advertised "rich and colourful" settings that included foreign mansions, brothels, and the courtroom. Another troupe, the Co-Stage, initially presented its story as being retold by Lianying's parents "with their own mouths" and featuring her sister Yuying. (Note: Unlike the Laughter Stage, wherein male actors played female characters, the French Concession-based Co-Stage was permitted to employ female actors (He 2018, p. 238). Yuying was later replaced by Lu Lanchun, a noted Peking opera performer (Cheng 2024, p. 70).) The Co-Stage production was highly successful, selling out tickets throughout its two-month run.

A third Peking opera troupe, the New Stage, began performing its adaptation in mid-February 1921. Again emphasizing its ability to retell the story accurately, the troupe used a real car on stage. It also added new scenes, including an escape through a river. This adaptation, which was based on Peking opera but starred "civilized drama" actor Wang Youyou, was a success. During the initial eighty-day run, tickets regularly sold out, with the best seats being reserved in advance. In 1923, the New Stage brought its adaptation on tour, finding acclaim in Hangzhou.

Throughout the 1920s, travelling troupes adapted the story to the stage, with performances in Taiwan noted as late as 1926. Performances based on the story have continued into the 2000s. The comedian Guo Degang developed a crosstalk routine based on the case, and a pingtan adaptation was staged by the Shanghai Pingtan Troupe in 2013 as part of a series on Shanghai's history.

=== Music ===
Side A

Side B

Two arias by Lu Lanchun inspired by the case; taken from the Peking opera by the Co-Stage troupe, they were issued by Pathé Orient in 1921.

As the people of Shanghai followed the trial, numerous folk songs were recorded in contemporary newspapers. Such works often retold the lives of Lianying and Yan, using a combination of narrative and lyrical elements to present themselves as coming from the persons involved in the case. Many were also recorded in mass-produced songbooks, some of which also included songs from the stage adaptations or original compositions based on the same theme. (Note: Twenty-four of these folk songs, collected by the folklorists Liu Fu and Li Jiarui, are held at the Academia Sinica in Taipei (Yin 2008, pp. 264–270).) One folk song, published in The New World on 18 September 1920, concluded:

Look at Ruisheng. [He] was still young. [He] once went abroad. He [graduated] from a college and worked in a foreign firm. [He] belonged to upper-class [society]. Had he been willing to learn from good examples, he would have had a great prospect. [Yet,] he gambled and went whoring excessively so that [he] lost his life.

Recordings of songs inspired by the case were also pressed. In 1921, Pathé Orient issued a phonograph recording of two arias by Lu Lanchun that had originated from the Co-Stage production. Collectively titled Awakening from a Dream (惊梦), these were immensely popular, and entertainers were often asked to give live a cappella performances. One of the arias, sung by Lianying in a dream sequence, became so pervasive that the essayist Miu Chongqun described it as representing "the very sound of Shanghai as both an attractive and an evil city." Several further phonographs were released, including a cover by Yan Qilan as well as the songs "Shoot to Kill" (槍斃) by Lu Shushen and "The Shooting Death of Yan Ruishen" (銃殺閻瑞生), recorded variously by Zhang Yijin and Wang Jifan.

=== Film ===
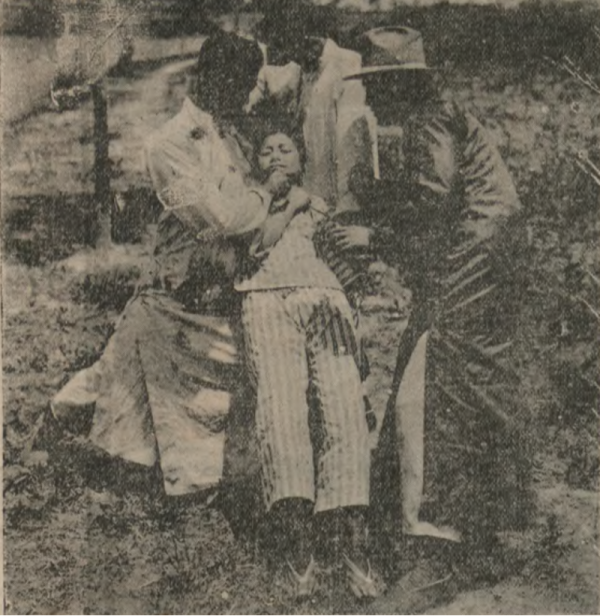
The murder of Lianying as depicted in Yan Ruisheng (1921)

The murder of Lianying has inspired several films. In 1921, a group of Shanghai youths from the Chinese Cinema Study Society made a feature film based on the events. Directed by Ren Pengnian and released under the title Yan Ruisheng, this adaptation was commercially successful. Due to its focus on a courtesan and a murderer, it was criticized as failing to promote public morality. In 1923, the film was banned in Shanghai, and backlash against it and Zhang Shichuan's Zhang Xinsheng (1922) – another film based on a notorious murder case – resulted in censorship policies targeting films that "disturbed social order, damaged social mores and (in the case of foreign films particularly) were offensive to Chinese sensibility".

In 1938, the case was again adapted to film, this time by Kwan Man-ching in Hong Kong. Starring Yip Fat-yeuk as Yan Ruisheng and Fa Ying-yung as Lianying, this version was given the English title Woe to the Debauched! but known in Chinese as Yan Ruisheng. The case later inspired Jiang Wen's Gone with the Bullets (2014). The film, in which Jiang starred alongside Ge You and Shu Qi, followed a mafioso in 1920s China who arranged to launder money by staging a beauty pageant. Reviews were generally negative, with particular focus on its slow pacing and loose narrative; in The Paper, Shi Jianfeng wrote that the film was not as exciting as the events that inspired it.

== Works cited ==
- Chen Jianhua (陈建华) (24 August 2021). 《阎瑞生》摄制与剧照之百年回观 [A Century-long Review of the Filming and Stills of "Yan Ruisheng"]. The Paper (in Chinese). Archived from the original on 19 January 2025.
- Cheng Hsiao-yuan (程筱媛) (2024). 被搬演的真實: 1920 年代上海時事戲《槍斃閻瑞生》 [Reality on Stage: Executing Yen Ruisheng, a 1920's Topical Drama in Shanghai]. Journal of Chinese Ritual, Theatre & Folklore (in Chinese) (223): 49–89.
- Des Forges, Alexander (2007). Mediasphere Shanghai: The Aesthetics of Cultural Production. Studies of the Weatherhead East Asian Institute, Columbia University. Honolulu: University of Hawai'i Press. ISBN 978-0-8248-3081-6.
- "Director Pays Homage to Famous Films". Shanghai Daily. Shanghai. 26 December 2014. ProQuest 1640452864.
- "Gone With the Bullets". Shenzhen Daily. Shenzhen. 26 December 2014. ProQuest 1640426036.
- Gronewold, Sue (2017). "Prostitution in Shanghai". In García, Magaly Rodríguez; van Voss, Lex Heerma; van Nederveen Meerkerk, Elise (eds.). Selling Sex in the City: A Global History of Prostitution, 1600s–2000s. Studies in Global Social History. Vol. 31. Leiden: Brill. pp. 567–593. doi:10.1163/9789004346253_023. ISBN 978-90-04-34625-3.
- Harris, Kristine (2012). "Two Stars on the Silver Screen: The Metafilm as Chinese Modern". In Henriot, Christian; Yeh, Wen-hsin (eds.). History in Images: Pictures and Public Space in Modern China. China Research Monograph. Vol. 66. Berkeley: Institute of East Asian Studies. pp. 191–244. ISBN 978-155729-155-4.
- He, Qiliang (2018). Newspapers and the Journalistic Public in Republican China: 1917 as a Significant Year for Journalism. New York, London: Routledge. ISBN 978-0-429-79669-2.
- Hershatter, Gail (1999). Dangerous Pleasures: Prostitution and Modernity in Twentieth-Century Shanghai. Berkeley: University of California Press. ISBN 978-0-520-20439-3.
- Jiang Xing-peng (姜兴鹏) (2021). 20 世纪 20 年代上海的传媒生态探究: 要要以莲英案为中心的历史考察 [A Study of the Media Ecology of Shanghai in 1920s: A Historical Survey of the "Lianying Case"]. Journal of Chaohu University (in Chinese). 23 (1): 94–100, 107. doi:10.12152/j.issn.1672-2868.2021.01.013 (inactive 23 March 2026).
- Li, Xiaobing (2012). "Warlord Period". In Li, Xiaobing (ed.). China at War: An Encyclopedia. Bloomsbury Publishing USA. pp. 481–482. ISBN 978-1-59884-416-0.
- Luo, Mengyu; Zhong, Wenyu (2024). "The Birth, Death, and Revitalisation of Chinese Popular Music in Shanghai". In Homan, Shane; Strong, Catherine; O'Hanlon, Seamus; Tebbutt, John (eds.). Interrogating Popular Music and the City. New York and London: Routledge. pp. 60–73. doi:10.4324/9781003300182-7. ISBN 978-1-003-30018-2.
- Pan Yaochang (潘耀昌) and Xu Li (徐立) (2011). 上海早期都市文艺先锋 —《真相画报》 [Shanghai's Early Urban Art Pioneer – "The True Record"] (PDF). Journal of Shanghai University (in Chinese): 131–140.
- 第三节 娼妓 [Section 3: Prostitution]. Shanghai Chronicles (in Chinese). Government of Shanghai. 4 July 2008. Archived from the original on 28 August 2023.
- 上海大辞典: 人物篇, 附录 [Shanghai Dictionary: Characters, Appendix] (in Chinese). Vol. 2. Shanghai: Shanghai Dictionary Publishing House. 2007. ISBN 978-7-5326-2330-3.
- Shi Jianfeng (石剑峰) (12 December 2014). 《一步之遥》原型: 1920年上海滩媒体围观的"阎瑞生案" [The Forebearer of "Gone with the Bullets": the "Yan Ruisheng Case" Watched by the Media in Shanghai in 1920]. The Paper (in Chinese). Archived from the original on 27 December 2014.
- "Telling Stories about Shanghai". Shanghai Daily. Shanghai. 6 September 2013. ProQuest 1430319706.
- "The Murder of Lien Ying". The North-China Herald. Shanghai. 14 August 1920. p. 437 – via Newspaper Archive.
- "The Murder of Lien Ying". The North-China Herald. Shanghai. 28 August 1920. pp. 573–575 – via Newspaper Archive.
- "The Murder of Lien Ying". The North-China Herald. Shanghai. 18 September 1920. p. 751 – via Newspaper Archive.
- "The Murder of Lien Ying". The North-China Herald. Shanghai. 27 November 1920. p. 606 – via Newspaper Archive.
- 香港影片大全: 卷. 1913–1941 [The Complete Collection of Hong Kong Films: Vol. 1913–1941] (in Chinese). Hong Kong: Hong Kong Film Archive. 1997. ISBN 978-962-8050-03-1.
- Wang, Kaiho (25 December 2014). "Critics Target Gone with the Bullets". China Daily. ProQuest 1640135570.
- Warra, Carrie (1999). "Invention, Industry, Art: The Commercialization of Culture in Republican Art Magazines". In Cochran, Sherman (ed.). Inventing Nanjing Road: Commercial Culture in Shanghai, 1900–1945. Ithaca, New York: Cornell East Asia Program. pp. 61–90. ISBN 978-1-885445-63-6.
- Werner, Morris R. (3 October 1920). "Pretty Lien Ying - Chinese Sing Song Girl - Strangely Slain". The New York Tribune. Vol. VII. New York. p. 5 – via Newspaper Archive.
- Xiao, Zhiwei (2013). "Policing Film in Early Twentieth-Century China". In Rojas, Carlos; Chow, Eileen (eds.). The Oxford Handbook of Chinese Cinemas. Oxford: Oxford University Press. pp. 452–471. doi:10.1093/oxfordhb/9780199765607.013.0025. ISBN 978-0-19-998331-5.
- Yin Jen-Yu (林仁昱) (2008). 有關「閻瑞生謀殺王蓮英案」俗曲研究 [The Research of Popular Tunes about the Murder Case "Yen Ruey Sheng"]. Chinese Literature Chronicle (in Chinese). 12 (18): 233–271. doi:10.6973/CJ.200812.0233.
- Zhang, Yingjin (1998). "Censorship and Film". In Zhang, Yingjin; Xiao, Zhiwei (eds.). Encyclopedia of Chinese Film. New York, London: Routledge. pp. 109–110. ISBN 978-0-415-15168-9.
- Zhong, Dafeng; Zhang, Zhen; Zhang, Yingjin (1997). "From Wenmingxi (Civilized Play) to Yingxi (Shadowplay): The Foundation of Shanghai Film Industry in the 1920s". Asian Cinema. 9 (1): 46–64. doi:10.1386/ac.9.1.46_1.
