= Lianying =

Lianying could refer to:

- Li Lianying (Chinese: 李连英), Chinese imperial eunuch
- Wang Lianying (Chinese: 王莲英; c. 1900–1920), Chinese courtesan and murder victim
