= Courtesan election =

Historical elections in China

- Traditional Chinese: 花選
- Simplified Chinese: 花选
- Literal meaning: flower selections
Transcriptions
Standard Mandarin
- Hanyu Pinyin: Huā xuǎn
- Wade–Giles: Hua^{1} hsüan^{3}

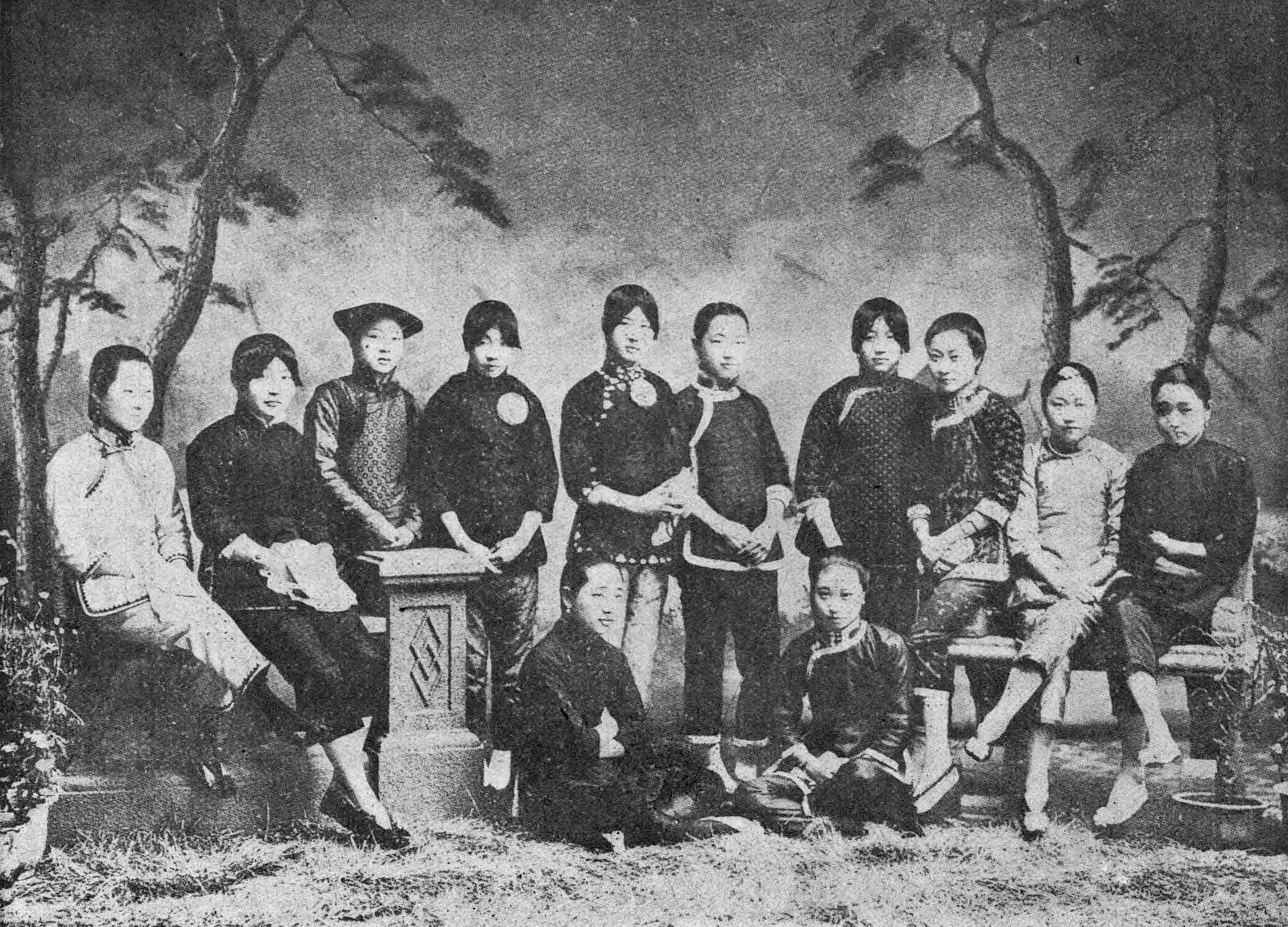
Some winners of the 1917 courtesan election in Shanghai

Courtesan elections (Traditional Chinese: 花選; simplified Chinese: 花选; pinyin: Huā xuǎn; lit. 'flower selections') were elections held in late Qing and early Republican-era China to produce a "flower list" (花榜; Huā bǎng; Hua^{1} pang^{3}) of especially beautiful and talented courtesans. Building on a practice reported since the 17th-century, these elections are first recorded in the 1860s. The earliest were organized by individual literata, while later ones were put on by newspapers as a means of increasing publicity. Courtesans who won elections also benefitted from increased demand, while failure in elections could be injurious to their reputations. Large elections were held in Shanghai in 1897, organized by Li Boyuan of the Youxi Bao, and in 1917, by Zheng Zhengqiu of The New World. These elections, which drew extensive attention in contemporary China, became less popular as public discourse about prostitution increasingly condemned the practice. The last elections were held in the late 1920s.

== History ==
=== Flower lists and the first elections ===
In China, the practice of prostitution has historically been permitted, and at times licensed and taxed. Lists of prominent courtesans were produced in China from at least the 17th-century. Works from Suzhou and Nanjing were compiled in 1617 and 1618, respectively, and another from Jiangsu has been dated to 1656. Traditionally, these lists were produced by literati who identified courtesans based on their various skills (musical, etc.). The resulting lists would then be circulated among potential clients and presented as works of literature; at times, these lists would include samples of poetry, produced either by the judge or his friends. As early as the late Ming dynasty, such lists borrowed from the Imperial Examination, using the same titles in their ranking. Lists often paired courtesans with specific flowers. Such lists prepared by individual writers continued through the 19th century, with one example published in Shanghai by Zou Tao in 1884.

The earliest recorded courtesan election in Shanghai occurred in 1868, sponsored by a Gangzhai Zhuren. The winner, Li Qiaoling, received a thousand silver dollars. Competitions in the 1870s produced two books, Illustrated Appraisal of Twenty-four Courtesans as Flowers and an 1877 sequel that named Li Peilan as winner. More elections were held in the 1882, 1883, and 1885, as well as 1890 and 1891. Such elections were organized by individual sponsors and involved a small number of literati, though over time larger panels of judges became more common.

=== Under Li Boyuan ===
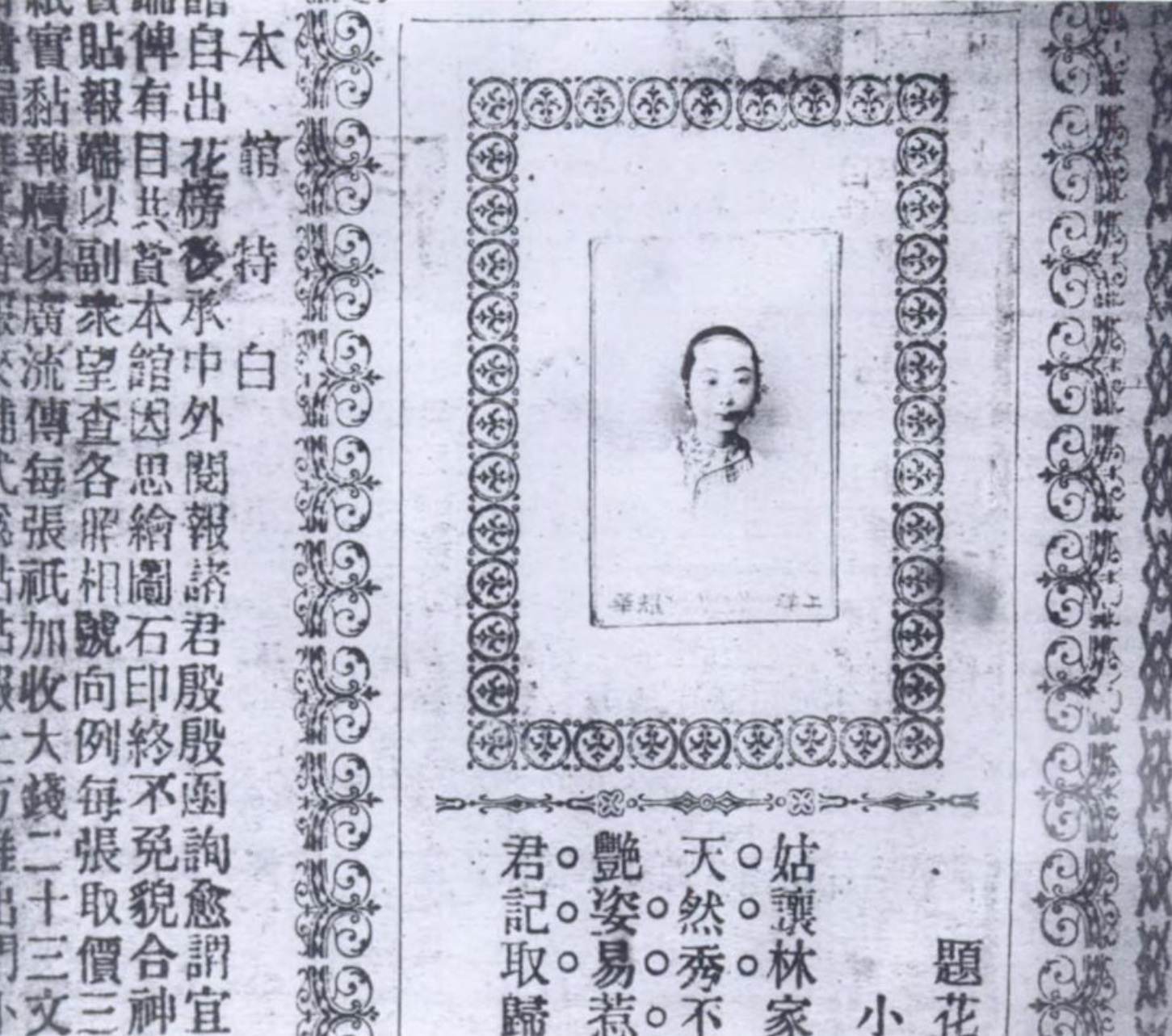
Coverage of Hua Lijuan, second-place winner of Shanghai's 1898 election, in Youxi Bao

In August 1897, an election was organized by Li Boyuan, a writer who had established Youxi Bao that year. Limited to younger, less established courtesans, this election served in part to promote them, and in part to promote the tabloid. Ballots were collected at its headquarters, and courtesans were likewise required to announce their candidacies through tablets placed at the offices. Nominators were required to present their reasons for naming candidates through essays, which were then published in the tabloid. Li satirically described this system as "modelled on the Western democratic voting [system]", whereby candidates were elected by write-in votes.

The first election sponsored by Youxi Bao was popular, with the tabloid selling 5,000 copies before noon on the first day, and receiving a hundred ballots within ten days of the announcement. More copies were printed, and Youxi Bao received more than two hundred letters from readers, some supportive and some critical. At the time, Shanghai was home to some two or three thousand courtesans, and the best means of identifying the courtesan who possessed the necessary "beauty, virtue, and artistic sophistication" was subject to debate. One publication urged that, although ballots were collected, Li should be the one to make the final determination. Ultimately, results were determined solely "on the basis of the number of votes with no other comments by the organizer, to show that no one thinks so highly of himself as to dare to take the seat of the judge". Sixteen-year-old Zhang Sibao was elected, having received nine letters of recommendation, with the final list consisting of 140 women.

Initially, courtesans in the Youxi Bao election were judged according to two criteria: beauty and artistic talent. Criteria were further revised in 1900, when the rules were modified to exclude courtesans with children and previously married women; the age range for nominees was also changed, being reduced from 16-to-20 to 13-to-18. Beginning with Li's fourth election, a more general talent category was added. Eventually, Youxi Bao was running four elections a year, which remained popular; when photographs of the 1898 winners were glued to the front page, queues of customers were reported. The Li-led elections were described by later writers as being fair and as strict as the Imperial Examination. As with earlier lists, the titles provided to winning courtesans were likewise drawn from the examination, based on the degrees attainable by civil servants.

=== Interim elections ===
In the first decade of the 20th century, elections continued to be held in Shanghai. These, however, were not sponsored by Youxi Bao, but other tabloids. The 1902 and 1903 elections were sponsored by Huatian Ribao, and the 1904 elections by Yuxian Ribao. Three separate publications organized elections in 1906, the Tianduobao, the Canghai Yizhubao, and the Guohunbao. In 1909, another election was organized by the Caifengbao; these were the last to be held in Shanghai before the 1911 Revolution. Similar contests were announced in Beijing and Huangzhou, with the earliest held in the latter city in 1910. Guangzhou held courtesan elections as early as 1907, sponsored by newspapers working in collaboration with brothel houses.

Later accounts indicated that decisions in these elections were made by organizers at restaurants, based on a small pool of candidates. Contemporary reports indicated that bribery was rampant, likening the money taken by journalists to the "selling offices and bartering positions" practised by Empress Dowager Cixi. In part due to these issues, and in part due to shifting discourses on courtesans, the elections lost popularity. Elections were not held in Shanghai from 1910 through 1916, which the journalism historian Qiliang He attributes to the dearth of tabloid magazines at the time and the Sinologist Gail Hershatter ascribes to the tumultuous political situation.

=== Shanghai's 1917 election ===
One Hundred Beauties of the Flower Kingdom (花國百美圖), a commemorative album published after the 1917 election in Shanghai

In 1917, one year after the establishment of The New World (新世界; Xīn shìjiè), the tabloid held its first courtesan election in Shanghai. Reflecting the shift from the Qing dynasty to the Republic of China, this competition was titled the "Election of the Flower State". In its structure, the election did not resemble the now-defunct imperial examination, but drew on the new national government. Titles were styled after republican ones, and included one president, two vice-presidents, and a prime minister. Lower titles included ministers and deputy ministers of four departments—talent, beauty, virtue, and skills—as well as councilwomen, chairwomen, members, military governors, magistrates, and civil officers.

The 1917 election was first announced on 25 November. The announcement—attributed to the prominent courtesan Lin Daiyu—and many of the submitted ballots were replete with references to classical Chinese literature, including the character Cui Yingying from Romance of the Western Chamber and works by Cao Pi and Tao Gu. Contestants were presented for voter evaluation between 10 and 15 December, and provided the option of singing; members of the general public were also urged to attend. Ballots were available for purchase to patrons, who were allowed to cast as many votes as they pleased.

The election results were announced on 23 December 1913, with Guanfang winning the top position with 35,500 ballots. Her vice-presidents were Judi and Beijin. Some patrons were reported to have bought thousands of ballots to ensure the success of their preferred candidate. After the election, biographies of the winners were published in tabloids, again paired with literary allusions, poems, and elegiac couplets; an album featuring photographs of a hundred of the winners was also sold. Winners (other than magistrates) received trophies, and their photographs were announced to be hung at the New World Entertainment Resort. Prizes, including perfumes and cigarettes, were donated by sponsors. Several of the winners continued to hold meetings, at which they delivered speeches that were carried in the press.

=== Final elections ===
The New World sponsored more elections in 1918 and 1919. The latter, held at the Great World Amusement Hall, received coverage for several months and featured new titles based on Chang'e and the moon dance. In 1920, two elections were run, one by The New World and another by the Qimei Milk Candy Company; the latter sought to elect the leader of the "fragrant nation", as The New World had registered the term "flower nation". Winners of the Qimei election received furniture, with the grand winner becoming the "milk president". More elections followed followed through the 1920s, though these tended to be smaller affairs. Similar elections are believed to have been held in Guangzhou through the decade, though they are poorly documented.

As the 1920s continued, public discourse on prostitution shifted. Major newspapers such as Shen Bao borrowed from Li Dazhao and the New Culture Movement's arguments against the practice, calling for its abolition even as tabloids continued to advocate for it. Authorities in Shanghai's International Settlement closed one-fifth of the area's brothels using a lottery system in 1920, with the remainder eliminated by 1925; courtesan houses moved to the French Concession, where the practice remained permitted. In Guangzhou, where elections had begun to be used as a fundraising tool, a 1926 event intended to include more than 500 courtesans was cancelled by the Guangdong government after receiving complaints from more than thirty women's organizations. Although courtesan elections were no longer held, several writers created their own histories of previous events, including titles and winners organized by year.

== Reception ==
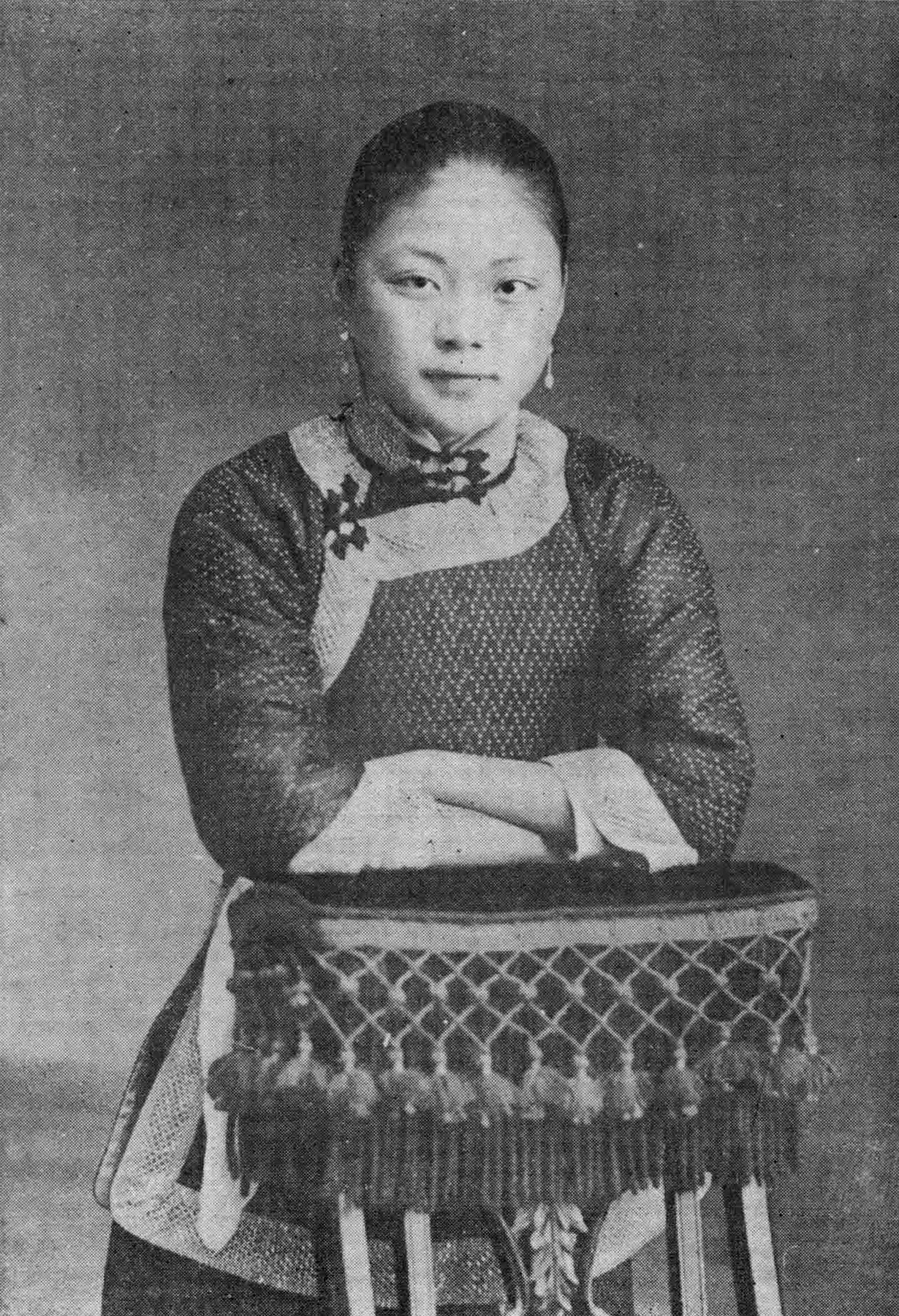
Wang Lianying faced impeachment after coming in fourth in Shanghai's 1917 election.

=== Effects on participants ===
According to Wang Tao, a writer active in Shanghai during the late 19th-century who judged the 1882 election, the naming of a woman to a flower list could increase her value tenfold. Elected courtesans enjoyed a period of increased fame, and capitalized on their election in newspaper advertisements; their elected titles were also commonly used in newspaper coverage. Several winners, such as Hu Baoyu and Yao Qianqiang, became the subjects of novels. However, this fame faded, and thus many courtesans would seek to find a husband while still enjoying popularity; during the Youxi Bao era, the tabloid would announce the marriages of former competitors. The nominators of courtesans, particularly in the Youxi Bao, also benefitted from the opportunity of demonstrating their literary skills to their peers; Hershatter notes this as the key difference between courtesan elections and modern beauty pageants.

Failure in elections could be detrimental to courtesans' reputations, with Wang Tao describing it as a form of disgrace. After the 1897 election, several courtesans wrote Youxi Bao to complain that their ranking had been too low, and ultimately a re-ranking was undertaken. Courtesans also complained that titles were expensive to maintain, as well-wishers would expect gifts. In 1919, one courtesan in Shanghai thus renounced her title. Wang Lianying, who had taken fourth place in the 1917 election and been recognized for her Beijing Opera skills, faced a campaign to impeach her when she refused to participate in further activities. Elections that allowed lower-class courtesans and prostitutes were criticized by the media, with an editorial in Huangzhou urging that the results of the 1925 election be invalidated for producing nothing but "average, lousy prostitutes".

=== Popular discourse ===
Initially, popular discourse on courtesan elections was positive, and they were presented as "playful, public events". The Zhejiang Shangbao in Huangzhou described that city's 1910 election as fun and exciting. In Guangzhou, elections were used to collect money for the Sun Yat-sen Memorial Hall. A 1926 event, involving more than 500 women, sold over 70,000 tickets. Events in Shanghai could draw several thousand contestants.

The spending on Shanghai's courtesan elections drew criticism from the Eastern Times, which questioned how patrons could buy thousands of ballots yet not donate money to disaster relief. Zheng Zhengqiu, the editor-in-chief of The New World during the 1917 election, was critical of the continued practice of prostitution in China as well as the attention drawn to the practice by elections, though he continued to sponsor them. Criticism increased through the 1920s. The New Culture Movement rejected courtesan entertainment as a "backwards tradition". Referring to a 1926 event in Guangzhou, the Women's Bureau decried elections as promoting and making light of prostitution while simultaneously humiliating and insulting women.

The elections have been read as criticism of the dominant political regimes. Catherine Yeh of Boston University, discussing the elections held under Li Boyuan, describes them as expressing discontent with the Qing dynasty's more autocratic approach to filling government positions. Zheng Zhengqiu wrote that The New World's elections were undertaken with the "intention to give the public a demonstration of how a democratic election could proceed and thereby urged both politicians and commoners to cherish their rights to vote". According to Hershatter, the use of contemporary political terms was considered to be criticism of the ineffectual central government.

== Works cited ==
- Chen Jianhua (陈建华) (24 August 2021). 《阎瑞生》摄制与剧照之百年回观 [A Century-long Review of the Filming and Stills of "Yan Ruisheng"]. The Paper (in Chinese). Archived from the original on 19 January 2025.
- Gronewold, Sue (2017). "Prostitution in Shanghai". In García, Magaly Rodríguez; van Voss, Lex Heerma; van Nederveen Meerkerk, Elise (eds.). Selling Sex in the City: A Global History of Prostitution, 1600s–2000s. Studies in Global Social History. Vol. 31. Leiden: Brill. pp. 567–593. doi:10.1163/9789004346253_023. ISBN 978-90-04-34625-3.
- He, Qiliang (2018). Newspapers and the Journalistic Public in Republican China: 1917 as a Significant Year for Journalism. New York, London: Routledge. ISBN 978-0-429-79669-2.
- Henriot, Christian (2001). Prostitution and Sexuality in Shanghai: A Social History, 1849–1949. Translated by Castelino, Noel. Cambridge: Cambridge University Press. ISBN 978-0-521-57165-4.
- Hershatter, Gail (1999). Dangerous Pleasures: Prostitution and Modernity in Twentieth-Century Shanghai. Berkeley: University of California Press. ISBN 978-0-520-20439-3.
- Jiang Xing-peng (姜兴鹏) (2021). 20 世纪 20 年代上海的传媒生态探究: 要要以莲英案为中心的历史考察 [A Study of the Media Ecology of Shanghai in 1920s: A Historical Survey of the "Lianying Case"]. Journal of Chaohu University (in Chinese). 23 (1): 94–100, 107. doi:10.12152/j.issn.1672-2868.2021.01.013 (inactive 23 March 2026).
- Remick, Elizabeth J. (2014). Regulating Prostitution in China: Gender and Local Statebuilding, 1900–1937. Redwood City, California: Stanford University Press. ISBN 978-0-8047-9083-3.
- Wang, Juan (2012). Merry Laughter and Angry Curses: The Shanghai Tabloid Press, 1897-1911. Contemporary Chinese Studies. Vancouver: University of British Columbia Press. ISBN 978-0-7748-2340-1.
- Yeh, Catherine Vance (2006). Shanghai Love: Courtesans, Intellectuals, and Entertainment Culture, 1850-1910. Seattle: University of Washington Press. ISBN 978-0-295-98567-1.
- Zeitlin, Judith T. (2006). "'Notes of Flesh' and the Courtesan's Song in Seventeenth-Century China". In Feldman, Martha; Gordon, Bonnie (eds.). The Courtesan's Arts: Cross-Cultural Perspectives. Oxford: Oxford University Press. pp. 75–102. ISBN 978-0-19-517028-3.
