= Daiyu =

Daiyu may refer to:

- Lin Daiyu, a character from the Chinese novel Dream of the Red Chamber
- Lin Daiyu (courtesan) (c. 1865 – 1925), Chinese courtesan
- Wang Daiyu, an Arab-Chinese scholar
- Daiyu Tatsumi, a former sumo wrestler
- Aunt Daiyu, a fictional character in the animated series Stitch & Ai
- Daiyu (Star Wars), a fictional planet in the Star Wars miniseries Obi-Wan Kenobi
