= Youxi Bao =

Chinese newspaper

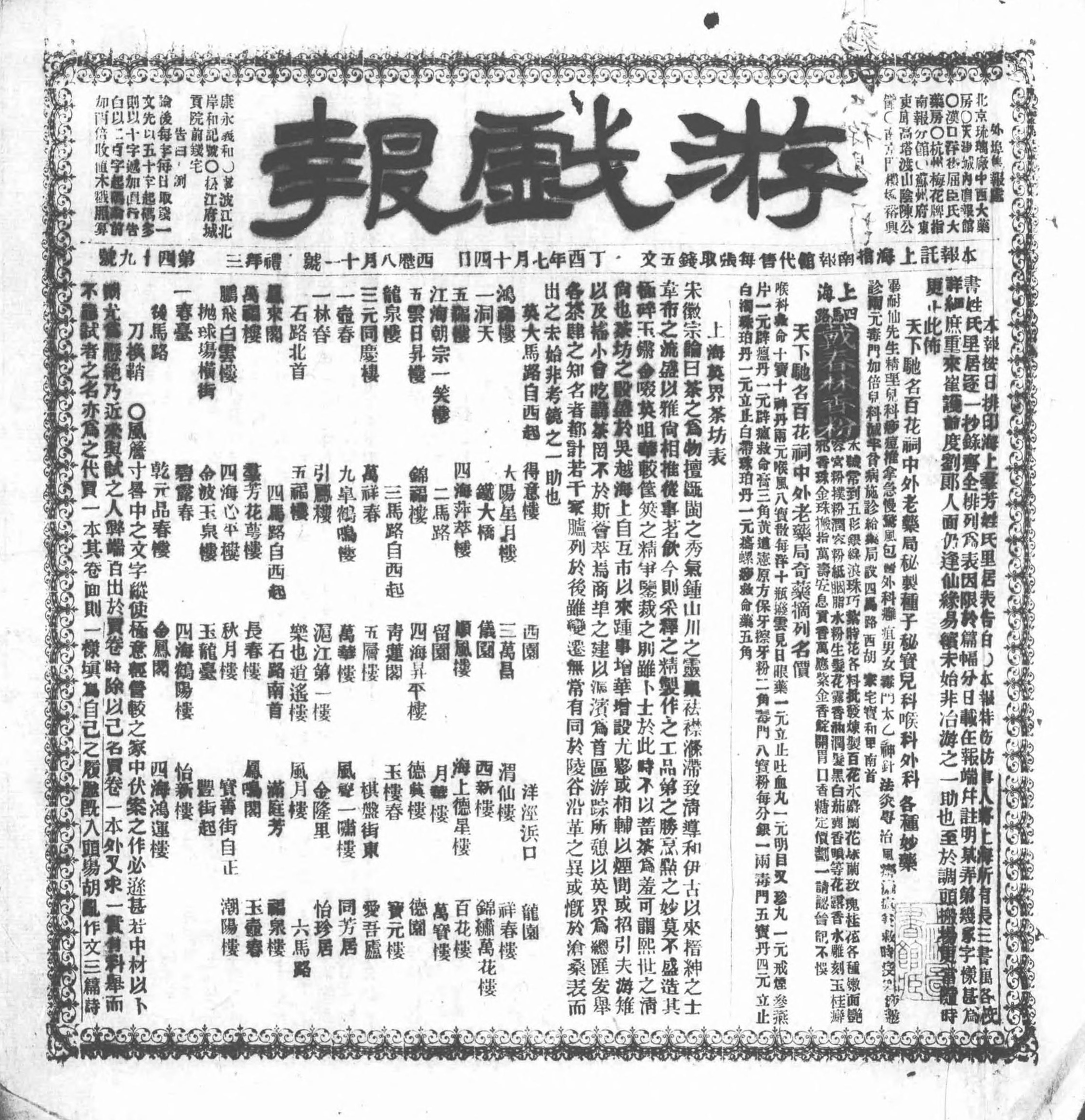
- Youxi Bao, 11 August 1897
- Native name
- Traditional Chinese: 遊戲報
- Simplified Chinese: 游戏报
Transcriptions
Standard Mandarin
- Hanyu Pinyin: Yóuxì Bào
- Wade–Giles: Yu^{2}hsi^{4} Pao^{4}
- Format: Tabloid
- Founded: June 24, 1897
- Ceased publication: See text
- Language: Chinese
- City: Shanghai
- Country: Qing China
- Circulation: 5,000–7,000
- Free online archives: Youxi Bao at the Internet Archive

Youxi Bao (Traditional Chinese: 遊戲報; simplified Chinese: 游戏报; pinyin: Yóuxì Bào) (Note: This title has variously been translated as Entertainment, Fun, Journal of Leisure, Recreation News (He 2018, p. 6), Amusement News (PL 1986, p. 548), and News About Recreation (Wang 1997, p. 3).) was an influential tabloid newspaper that operated in Shanghai, Qing China, from 1897 to 1910. Established by Li Boyuan, the tabloid rapidly became popular, in part due to its sponsorship of courtesan elections; by 1899, its circulation rivalled that of mainstream newspapers such as Shen Bao, with distribution reaching as far afield as Beijing. Although Li left the paper in 1900 to establish a new periodical, Youxi Bao continued to be published for several years.

In its coverage, Youxi Bao focused extensively on the courtesans who were active in Shanghai, dealing not only with their everyday activities but also their fashion choices. It also contained numerous letters, essays, and works of literature, including serialized novels and dramas, as well as several pages dedicated to advertisements. The approach taken by Youxi Bao was emulated by numerous other tabloids, though few were of comparable success.

== History ==
Youxi Bao was established in Shanghai, Qing China, in 1897 by Li Boyuan, with its first issue published on 24 June. Having previously established Zhinan Bao (The Guide) shortly after arriving in Shanghai in 1896, Li sought to use "a humorous pen ... to exhort and warn, and as a way to enlighten the world", and cited Western tabloids as his inspiration. The newspaper was headquartered at Li's home on Huifu Lane, near the main publication district at Fuzhou Road. In his editorials, he identified himself using the pen-name "Master of Fun".

To stimulate interest in the newspaper, Li Boyuan organized courtesan elections, asking nominators to submit essays justifying their support for candidates. Ballots were collected at its headquarters, and courtesans were likewise required to announce their candidacies through tablets placed at the offices. Soon after the announcement, the paper sold its entire 5,000 copy print-run, and thus printed another 3,000 copies. The tabloid received some 200 letters from readers, varying from supportive to critical. As these elections became more popular, Youxi Bao partnered with the Yaohua Studio to disseminate photographs of winners. In part through these elections, Youxi Bao grew rapidly. In 1899, after several months of collecting donations, the newspaper established a dedicated burial ground for courtesans near Longhua Pagoda.

For the first year and a half, Li handled Youxi Bao himself, serving as both writer and editor. Ultimately, he became overworked, a situation exacerbated by Youxi Bao's daily publication cycle, as well as his simultaneous publication of World Vanity Fair. The newspaper had a circulation of between five and seven thousand copies, with some estimates reaching 10,000 copies, though exact figures varied between editions. It also had networked distribution that reached as far as Beijing, Nanjing, and Hankou. Youxi Bao performed sufficiently well that Li purchased a new printing machine in 1898. A bound book, containing the first two years' issues, was printed in 1899.

In late 1898, Li hired Ouyang Juyuan as an assistant at Youxi Bao, and by 1900 Li had hired a professional manager. He attempted to free up time by only accepting guests and readers for one hour a day. In 1900, Li left Youxi Bao to establish a new tabloid, Splendors. With his departure, Youxi Bao ceased its sponsoring of courtesan elections. Youxi Bao ceased publication in 1910, having increasingly oriented its content to urban readers rather than literati.

== Content ==
In its initial issues, Youxi Bao followed a standard formula of one headline piece and eight shorter works. The headline pieces averaged a few hundred words, and included essays, letters, and poems. Advertisements were numerous, with two pages dedicated to them in 1897 and four pages by 1898; this later increased to six pages of advertisements, with only two pages of content. Readership included Shanghai's literati, merchants, and entertainers, as well as its professionals. Unlike mainstream newspapers such as Shen Bao, which were written almost exclusively in classical Chinese, Youxi Bao began using written vernacular Chinese as early as 1898.

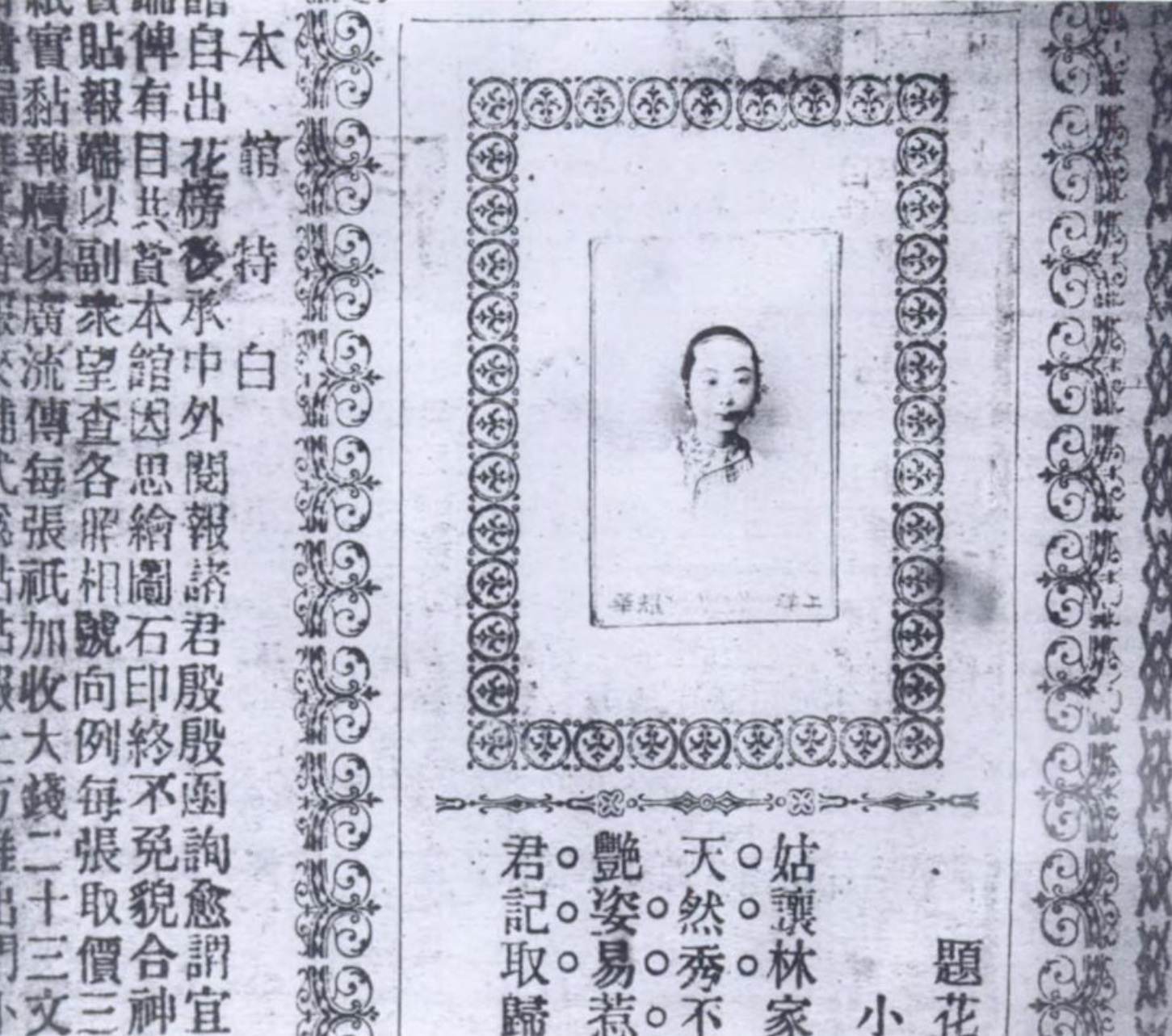
Photograph of Hua Lijuan, from Youxi Bao's 1898 courtesan election; the tabloid focused extensively on courtesans.

Youxi Bao extensively covered the everyday activities of Shanghai's courtesans, and individual courtesans would take out advertisements on its front page. It extensively covered what it termed "the Four Great Diamond Cutters", a group of prominent courtesans consisting of Lin Daiyu, Lu Lanfen, Jin Xiaobao, and Zhang Shuyu. When the newspaper established a dedicated burial ground for courtesans, donors' names were published in the newspaper. Reversals of traditional roles—i.e., cases in which courtesans invited their clients to theatres and restaurants—were reported, as were the marriage announcements of courtesans.

Particular attention was paid to courtesans' fashion choices, including the cut and colour of their dresses, as well as their jewellery. Other articles detailed the extravagant garb of their coachmen, as well as one courtesan who walked Fuzhou Road while dressed in men's clothing. Through such coverage, several of the items worn by Shanghai's courtesans became popular among upper-class women. Youxi Bao was critical of such trends, with one editorial urging married women to dress more simply, rather than emulate the clothing of courtesans seeking to attract clients.

Youxi Bao received numerous letters from readers, with some addressed from as far afield as Southeast Asia. It also accepted and published poetry submitted by readers, often dedicated to courtesans, as well as riddles. It also carried serialized works, including dramas and novels. For example, beginning in 1897, it carried Cheng Huiying's novel Phoenixes Flying Together (凤双飞; 鳳雙飛) on loose-leaf inserts; this illustrated serial was only concluded in 1903. Later novels tended to take political stances, which coincided with the increasingly anti-Qing sentiments expressed by the publication. Writers published in Youxi Bao included Qiu Fengjia, Qiu Shuyuan, Li Genyuan, and Pang Shubo.

== Legacy ==
Several small-format newspapers were established before Youxi Bao, with Bao Tianxiao mentioning the tabloid Xiaoxian Bao and Chen Boxi recalling publications by Huang Xiexun, Gao Taichi, and Yuan Zuzhi. However, in academic studies of journalism in China, Youxi Bao is generally identified as the first influential tabloid, having a circulation by 1899 equivalent to mainstream newspapers such as Shen Bao. Theodore Huters, author of Bringing the World Home: Appropriating the West in Late Qing and Early Republican China, wrote that this was, in its time period, "the most prominent and best-remembered of the entertainment papers."

Following its success, numerous periodicals began publication, many of which used the word 花 ('flower') in their titles. Such tabloids were relatively cheap to establish, with enormous potential revenues. Of its immediate followers, the historian Juan Wang writes that perhaps the most successful was Caifeng Bao (Anecdotes), established in 1898. The novelist Wu Jianren wrote that, "no fewer than ten newspapers followed the example [of Youxi Bao] and imitated its style, but none could surpass its excellence."

== Works cited ==
- He, Qiliang (2018). Newspapers and the Journalistic Public in Republican China: 1917 as a Significant Year for Journalism. New York, London: Routledge. ISBN 978-0-429-79669-2.
- Henriot, Christian (2001). Prostitution and Sexuality in Shanghai: A Social History, 1849–1949. Translated by Castelino, Noel. Cambridge: Cambridge University Press. ISBN 978-0-521-57165-4.
- Hershatter, Gail (1999). Dangerous Pleasures: Prostitution and Modernity in Twentieth-Century Shanghai. Berkeley: University of California Press. ISBN 978-0-520-20439-3.
- Huters, Theodore (2017). Bringing the World Home: Appropriating the West in Late Qing and Early Republican China. Honolulu: University of Hawaii Press. ISBN 978-0-8248-7401-8.
- PL (1986). "Li Pao-chia". In Nienhauser, William H. (ed.). The Indiana Companion to Traditional Chinese Literature. Vol. 1. Bloomington: Indiana University Press. ISBN 978-0-253-32983-7.
- Wang, David Der-wei (1997). Fin-de-siècle Splendor: Repressed Modernities of Late Qing Fiction, 1849–1911. Stanford: Stanford University Press. ISBN 978-0-8047-2845-4. - Article on book: Fin-de-siècle Splendor: Repressed Modernities of Late Qing Fiction, 1849–1911
- Wang, Juan (2012). Merry Laughter and Angry Curses: The Shanghai Tabloid Press, 1897-1911. Contemporary Chinese Studies. Vancouver: University of British Columbia Press. ISBN 978-0-7748-2340-1.
- Yeh, Catherine Vance (2006). Shanghai Love: Courtesans, Intellectuals, and Entertainment Culture, 1850-1910. Seattle: University of Washington Press. ISBN 978-0-295-98567-1.
