= Zhongzhou =

Zhongzhou or Zhong Prefecture (忠州) may refer to:

== Ancient Chinese places ==
- Zhongzhou, a former prefecture in roughly modern Zhong County, Chongqing, China
- Zhongzhou, a former prefecture in roughly modern Ding'an County, Hainan, China
- Zhongzhou, a former prefecture in roughly modern Fusui County, Guangxi, China
- Zhongzhou, a former prefecture in roughly modern Shanyin County, Shanxi, China
- Zhongzhou, a former prefecture in roughly modern Donglan County, Guangxi, China

== Chinese townships ==
- Zhongzhou, Yueyang, a township in Yueyang County, Hunan.

== See also ==
- Chungju (Korean equivalent)
- Haojing, also known as Zongzhou, the Western Zhou capital
