= Lin Daiyu (courtesan) =

Chinese courtesan (c. 1865 – 1925)

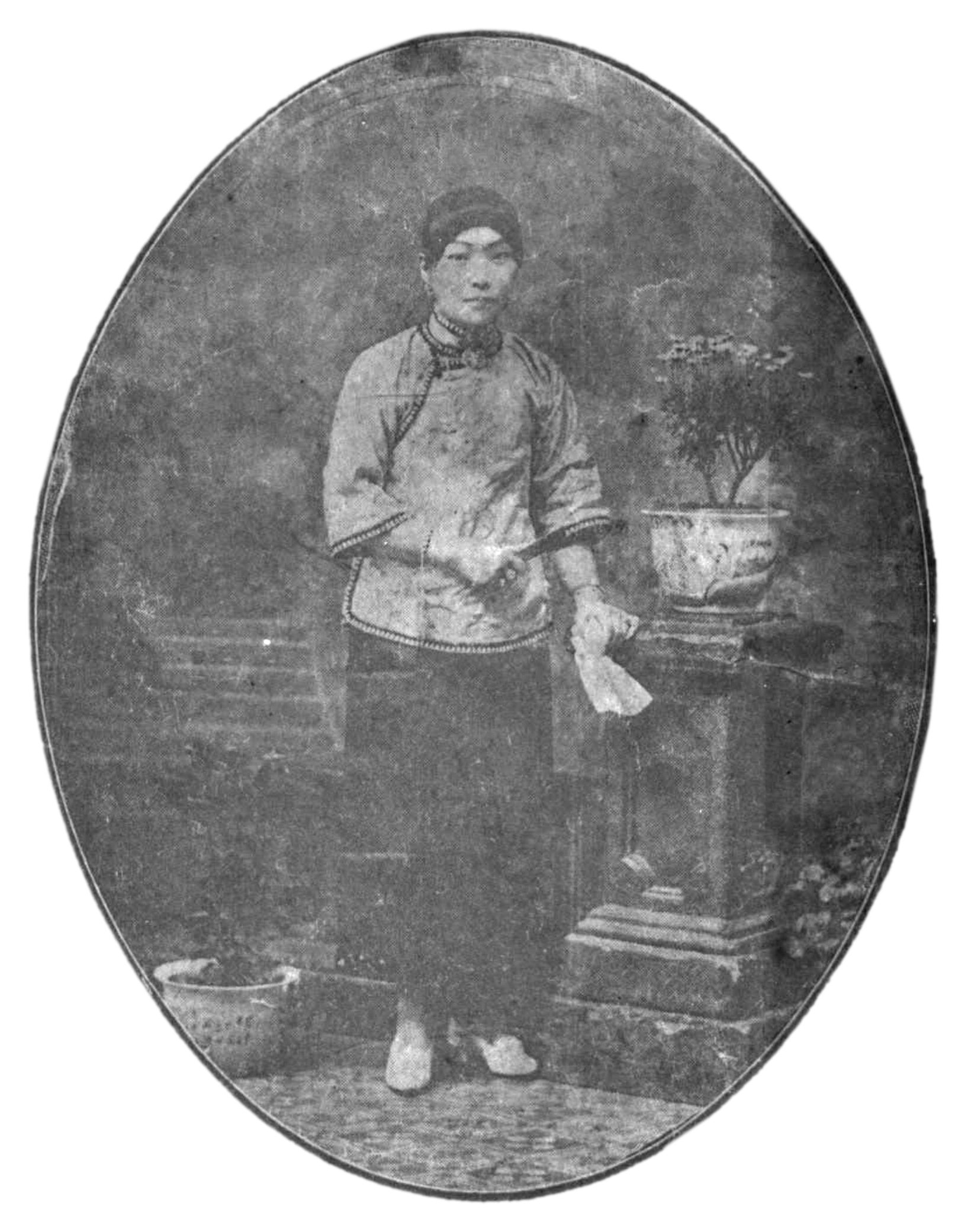
Lin Daiyu as depicted on the cover of the 1919 unauthorized biography

Lin Daiyu (Chinese: 林黛玉; pinyin: Lín Dàiyù, c. 1865 – 1925) was a Chinese courtesan active in Shanghai during the Qing dynasty and early Republic of China. Many things about her early life are unknown, including her birth name and place of birth; her professional name was taken from the character in Cao Xueqin's novel Dream of the Red Chamber.

By the end of the century, Lin had risen to prominence in Shanghai's courtesan circles; she remained active until 1921. During her career, she presented an extravagant persona that included opulent clothing and heavy make-up, and received extensive coverage of her fashion and relationships. Newspapers presented her as a "bad girl" who crossed class lines and became a concubine to clear her debts. At the same time, Lin was framed as an icon of Shanghai's courtesan culture, such that an announcement for courtesan elections in 1917 was issued in her name.

== Biography ==
=== Early life ===
Lin was born c. 1865. Her hometown is not known; reported locations include Yunjian, Songjiang, and a town between Suzhou and Songjiang. Her birth name is not known, though Jinbao was reported by one biographer. Lin Daiyu was her professional name, taken from the character in Cao Xueqin's novel Dream of the Red Chamber. She was not the first courtesan to take the name, which was popular among late-Qing courtesans. In Shanghai, one woman called herself Lin Daiyu in the 1870s before styling herself Hu Baoyu, after the novel's male protagonist, and donning male garb.

Little is known of Lin's early life. A 1922 guidebook by Wang Liaoweng described her as the daughter of a poor plasterer who disowned her due to her mother's promiscuity. As narrated by Wang, Lin first had sexual intercourse at the age of seven, entered into an arranged marriage at the age of eight, and was prostituted by her mother from the age of ten. Wang continues that Lin was brought to Shanghai by her mother-in-law, worked as a servant, but was then prostituted by another servant at a brothel in Tianjin. After a case of syphilis left her scarred, Lin was dismissed from the brothel and returned to Shanghai. Denying claims made in an unauthorized biography, in 1919 Lin described herself as coming from a reputable family.

In Shanghai, Lin gained prominence through carefully managed extravagance. She kept a talking parrot as a pet, and was known to attend major social gatherings in fashionable clothing. She was reported to use make-up to conceal her scars and apply false eyebrows with charcoal. Such thick make-up and darkly shaded eyebrows later became popular among Shanghai's courtesans, despite being contrary to conventional Chinese beauty standards. The Sinologist Catherine Yeh likens the make-up used by Lin to that of stage actors, and notes that Lin would have been familiar with stage make-up through her involvement in the all-women Maoer opera troupe. As a result of her extravagance, Lin was frequently in debt.

Wu Jianren writes that, after returning to Shanghai, Lin became the concubine of a merchant named Huang, though the relationship was short-lived. Wang writes that Lin subsequently becoming the concubine of a magistrate named Wang Hengfang, who paid off her debts, while simultaneously conducting affairs with the Beijing opera performers Li Chunlai and Heier Chen Jitai. Lin's relationship with Wang Hengfang ultimately ended, though narratives differ. Wang Liaoweng describes Wang Hengfang growing enraged at the affairs, threatening Li, but later being blackmailed for liaising with a prostitute and actors. Meanwhile, writing in 1967, Chen Dingshan described Lin as enjoying a life of luxury in this time.

=== Prominence ===
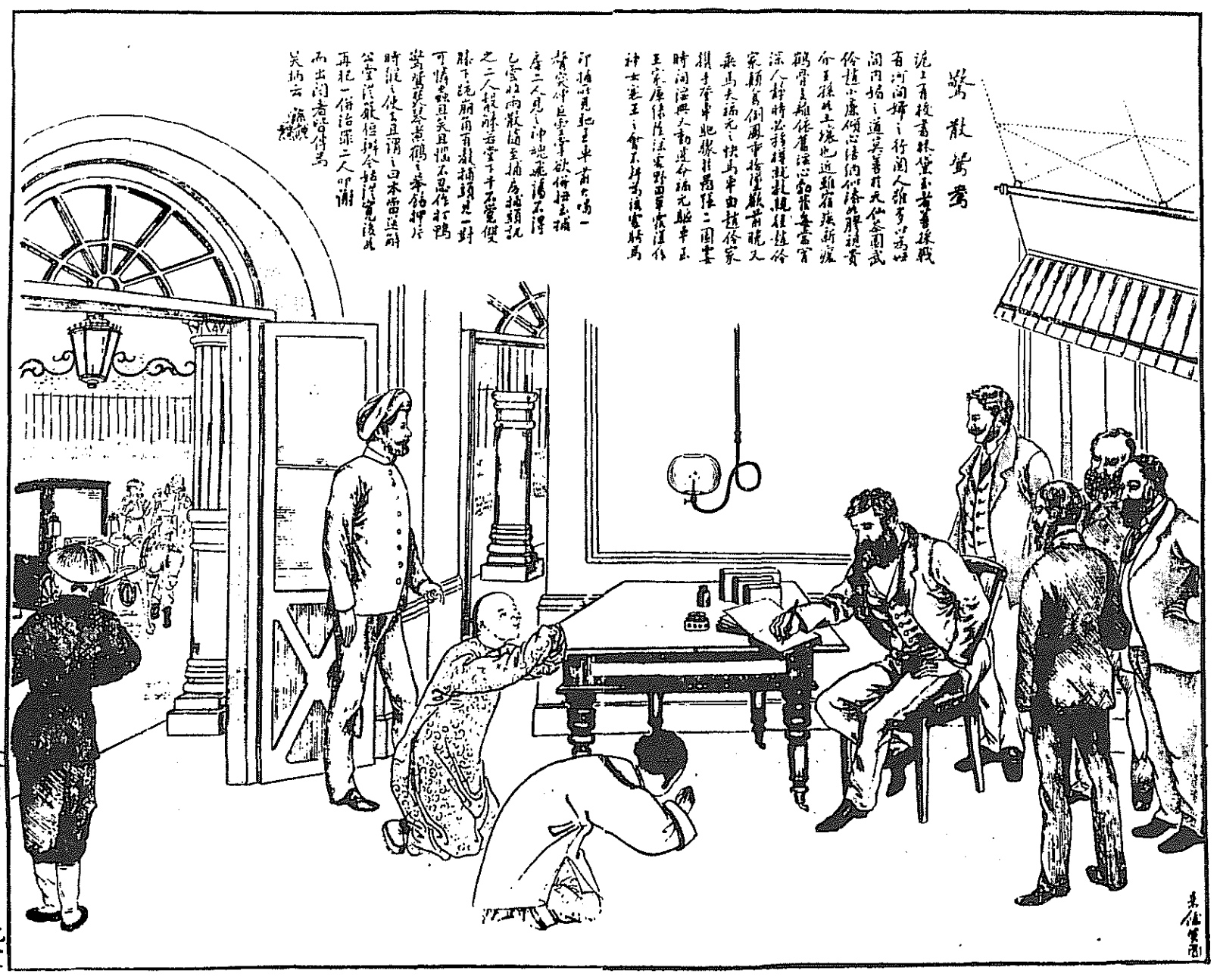
Lithograph by Zhu Ruxian depicting Lin and a client begging a Western magistrate for clemency

In the 1890s, Lin remained active as a courtesan, with clients including scholars, merchants, and government officials; She occupied premises on Daxing Lane, and was reported to be considering a move to the upscale Nanjing Road area. At the same time, she also practised outside the brothel, being arrested in 1897 for engaging in sexual activities in her carriage with a client. Outside of her courtesan activities, Lin became involved in charity. She was entrusted with collecting donations for the establishment of a cemetery for courtesans. Letters written in her name called for compassion and highlighted the suffering borne by courtesans. The effectiveness of Lin's efforts has been reported variedly; one report indicated that she had collected 300 yuan in a night, while another accused her of mismanagement and embezzlement. A play depicting the establishment penned by Ouyang Juyuan and Pang Shubai focused on Lin's role, which was presented positively.

In 1897, the newspaper Youxi Bao headed by the author Li Boyuan identified Lin as one of Shanghai's four most prominent courtesans, a list that also included Lu Lanfen, Jin Xiaobao, and Zhang Shyu. These courtesans were collectively styled after the Four Heavenly Kings, who protect the Dharma in each of the cardinal directions. Individually, the women had little in common, without shared business interests or personalities. Collectively, though, these women received extensive coverage, with the Youxi Bao featuring their birthday parties, houses, and clothing, as well as letters from their admirers. In 1898, an opera was produced regarding these four courtesans. A fifty-chapter novel credited to Chousi Zhuren framed the women as physical reincarnations of the mythical devas, with Lin a manifestation of Molihong. Lin was considered the most charismatic of the four, and noted for her extensive network of wealthy connections.

During this period, Lin was associated with numerous men. She was reported to have taken eight thousand yuan to become the concubine of a Nanxun-based man named Qiu. This relationship, according to Wang Liaoweng, dissolved after Lin conducted several affairs, leading Qiu to attempt to addict her to opium and later locking her up. Zhou Shoujuan, meanwhile, describes the relationship as having been sabotaged by an intermediary. Lin's later relationships through the end of the century are said to have included a Boxer leader, an official in Tianjin, a soldier in Wuchang, and the actor Lu Sanbao; another rumoured lover was Ouyang Juyuan, the apprentice of Li Boyuan. In the 1890s, Lin began a relationship with a teenaged opera performer; she was reported to have told friends that she "[took] it as a drug for [her] health."

Lin remained prominent in the early 20th century, making appearances at several storytelling halls in February 1903. She established her own opera house in Hankou, but this venture failed and she returned to Shanghai. In the 1910s, Lin was reported to be in a relationship with an actor named Long Xiaoyun, spending lavishly to clothe, feed, and educate him. This relationship, according to Wang Liaoweng, ended after Long took up with another courtesan. In 1914, Lin worked with another courtesan named Weng Meiqian to mobilize the Courtesan Evolution Corps, a group that sought to promote the education of courtesans and allow them to leave the profession. Although successful at raising funds, the scheduled lessons conflicted with the courtesans' work schedules, and ultimately the project was short lived.

=== Later life ===
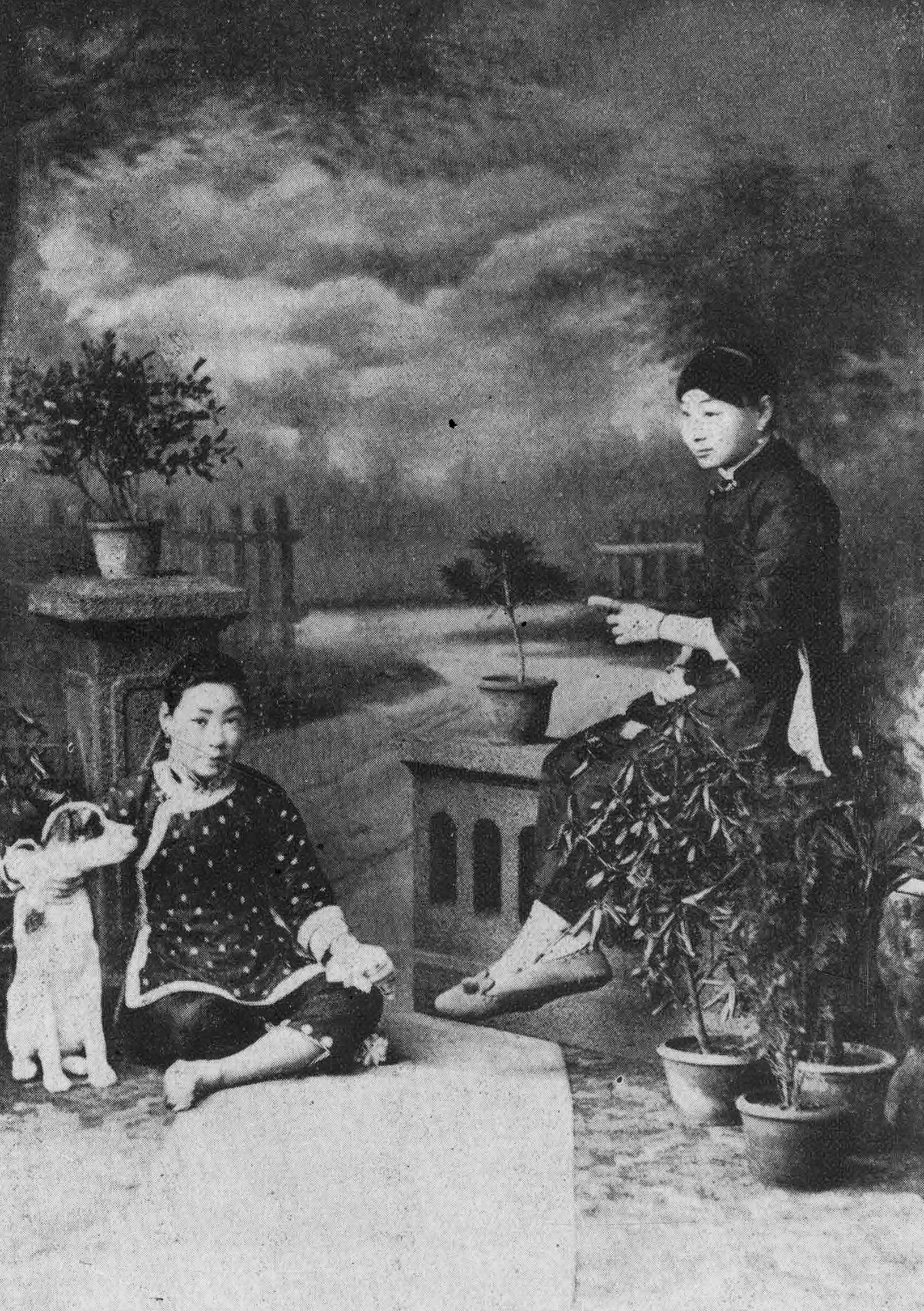
Xiao Lin Daiyu (right), the adopted daughter of Lin Daiyu, with another courtesan (1917)

In September 1919, Lin was reported to have become the concubine of a mining company executive, accepting 3,000 yuan in return, and later that year she was reported to have drawn the attention of a dye merchant named Xue. In the latter case, Xue's wife was reported to have intervened extensively, locking Xue in the house and blocking any payments to Lin. This relationship ended in 1921, at which time Lin reportedly received 5,500 yuan as a separation payment. In March 1921, she led a group of courtesans in writing an opera to raise funds for assisting drought afflicted regions. The play was completed in several days, and then staged, with courtesans circulating in the audience after each song to collect donations.

In the meanwhile, Lin continued to act as a courtesan, including in Beijing and Shanghai. She also adopted another courtesan, who took the name Xiao ("Little") Lin Daiyu. She met the Japanese writer Ryūnosuke Akutagawa in the early 1920s, and was introduced as "the only person who knows the political secrets of the past twenty years" aside from President Xu Shichang.

Beginning in 1921, Lin became sickly, paralysed on her right side. Wang Liaoweng narrates that her last partner, a man named Wang, attempted to support her through her illness, including by summoning a shaman to oust any demons. After a brief recovery, Lin's condition worsened, and she took to using opium, hiring an attendant to light her pipe. The cost of the opium and medicine bankrupted her and strained her relationships. She died in 1925.

== Public image ==
In contemporary literature, anecdotes about Lin were widely disseminated. She was described as arrogant, reportedly forcing four scholars who attended a banquet to create art for her by locking away their shoes. Her relationships were widely discussed, particularly her concubinages – she was reported in 1898 to have been in seven or eight such relationships. She gained a reputation for entering concubinage, with the prospective partner expected to clear her debts. This process became known as "taking a bath" (洗澡; xǐzǎo), with a biography by Wu Jianren having Lin describe her first partner Huang as her "bathtub". This use of "taking a bath" for clearing one's debts later gained prominence among other courtesans.

Lin's interactions with other courtesans were also discussed, with the Youxi Bao covering her competition and interactions with the other prominent courtesans of the era, such as a spat between Lin and Lu Lanfen. Further discussion focused on Lin's relationships with drivers and actors. Stories of courtesans such as Lin Daiyu were widely circulated in contemporary Shanghai, being used as lessons on expected behaviours as well as the dangers of urban society. The narrative constructed by the press presented Lin as a "bad girl" who crossed class lines. At the same time, though, letters published in the 1890s also highlighted the emotional cost of her activities.

Lin was remembered fondly in early 20th century Shanghai, being described by the Sinologist Qiliang He as "the icon of the bygone golden times of the courtesan culture in fin-de-siècle Shanghai when literati were still the source of authenticity and truth about the cultural imaginary of women in the pleasure quarters". Lin framed herself as a star, drawing much media attention to herself, and along with Jin Xiaobao is credited by Catherine Yeh as helping create a star culture around Shanghai's courtesans. In the 1890s, Lin was perceived as an icon of fashion and style, such that her clothing and conveyance received expansive coverage; a pearl-embroidered coat she was seen wearing became popular with married upper-class women. Later, when The New World hosted its first courtesan election in 1917, Zheng Zhengqiu penned the announcement in Lin's voice. In 1919, an unauthorized biography of Lin titled Record of the Old Crab Walking Sideways was published; previously, she had dictated her own ghostwritten memoirs, focusing on her experiences with the Boxer Rebellion.

== Works cited ==
- He, Qiliang (2018). Newspapers and the Journalistic Public in Republican China: 1917 as a Significant Year for Journalism. New York, London: Routledge. ISBN 978-0-429-79669-2.
- Henriot, Christian (2001). Prostitution and Sexuality in Shanghai: A Social History, 1849–1949. Translated by Castelino, Noel. Cambridge: Cambridge University Press. ISBN 978-0-521-57165-4.
- Hershatter, Gail (1999). Dangerous Pleasures: Prostitution and Modernity in Twentieth-Century Shanghai. Berkeley: University of California Press. ISBN 978-0-520-20439-3.
- Yeh, Catherine Vance (2006). Shanghai Love: Courtesans, Intellectuals, and Entertainment Culture, 1850-1910. Seattle: University of Washington Press. ISBN 978-0-295-98567-1.
- Zamperini, Paola (1999). "But I Never Learned to Waltz: The "Real" and Imagined Education of a Courtesan in the Late Qing". Nan Nü. 1 (1): 107–144. doi:10.1163/156852699X00072. PMID 22029108.
