= Sex work in Shanghai in the 19th and 20th centuries =

Sex work in Shanghai in the 19th and 20th centuries led the city to become known as the "brothel of Asia". With rapid expansion of factories, migration, and refugees, gangs and prostitution quickly spread throughout Shanghai. This resulted in the exploitation of young Boat Dwellers women and children, sex trafficking, and imperialist policies. In addition, starvation refugees of the mid-19th century, shifted the economic and political state of Shanghai. This accelerated the spread of prostitution. A clear hierarchy within the sex industry developed, creating a large class distinction between the sex workers. Many young women worked tirelessly to make ends meet; others lived lives of luxury.

The policies and laws that sought to eradicate sex work in Shanghai soon followed. Despite outlawing sex work, these policies were a turning point that revolutionized the industry. At the turn of the Maoist period, sex work returned to the spotlight, leading to its persistence into the 21st century.

== History ==
Beginning in the mid-19th century, Shanghai was a center of internal migration as people sought jobs in agriculture and manufacturing or fled starvation and poverty. The arrival of disconnected people, plus the effects of foreign concessions established by the Europeans, fostered the spread of gangs and prostitutes like Boat Dwellers in the city.

By the end of the 19th century, Shanghai was among the largest entrepôts in the world. The thriving textile trade led to the construction of many factories that employed mostly women. In the early to mid-20th century, violence and World War 2 elsewhere in the country brought another influx of refugees and rising unemployment. Many women turned to sex work to survive. Combined with increased demand for sexual services, Shanghai became known as the "brothel of Asia". Beginning in the late 19th-century, elections of courtesans were organized to identify the most beautiful and talented, at first sponsored by individuals but later by newspapers such as Youxi Bao (Journal of Leisure) and The New World.

== Political and social change ==
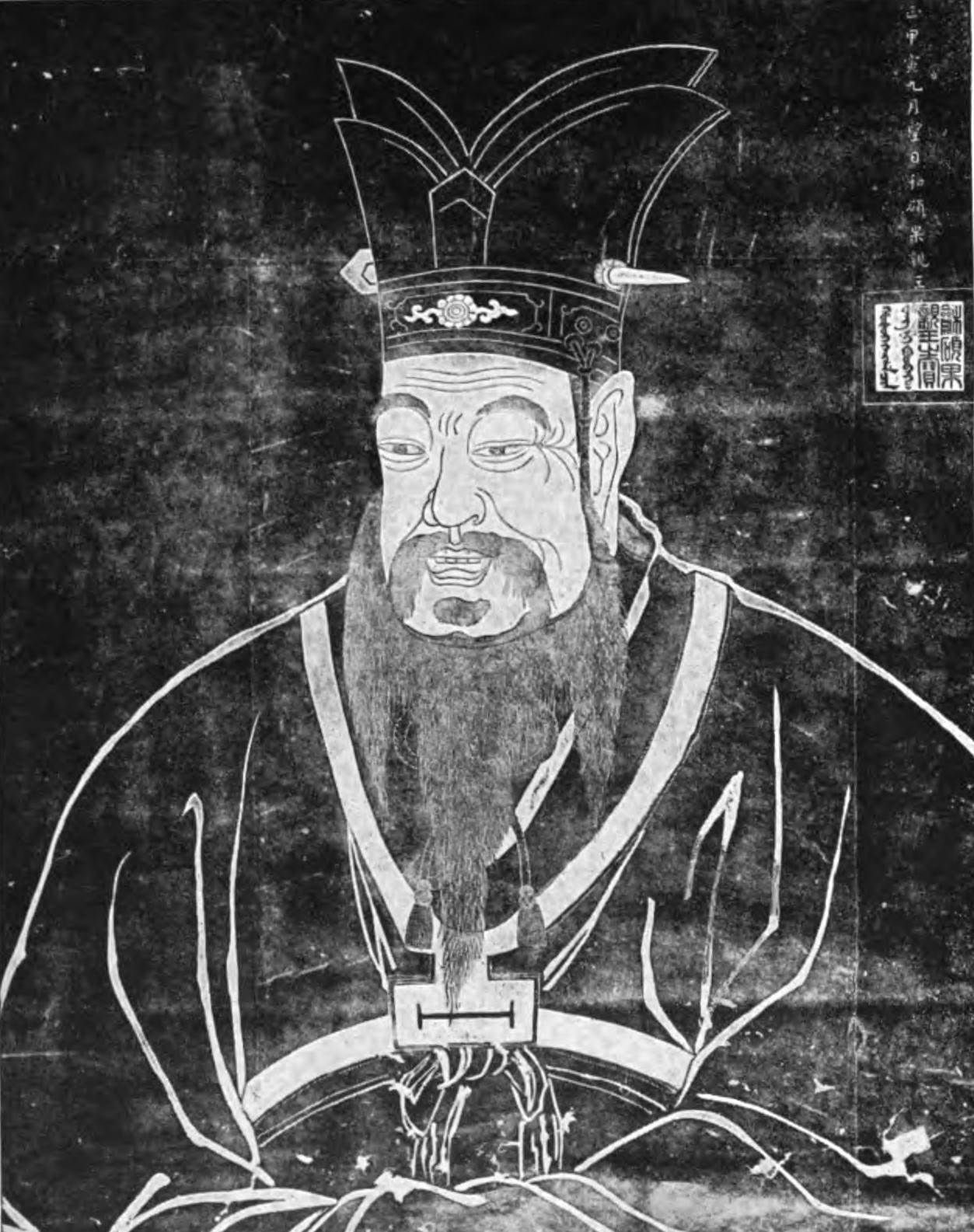
Confucius was a Chinese philosopher whose teachings and ideology formed the backbone of Chinese culture. This depiction of him was created more than two millennia after his death.

Despite Shanghai's reputation as one of the largest cities for sex work at the time, sex work was completely shunned. Especially during the Maoist period, sex work was met with retribution and damnation.

In addition to laws outlawing prostitution, Confucian ideals played a major role in pressuring men and women to stay away from prostitution. Within these ideals, everyone was seen as "innately good and educable". Men were also expected to be loyal to their families and avoid all risks.

Prostitution in Shanghai was officially outlawed in 1949. Before that, there had been heated debate about whether prostitution should merely be regulated due to its contribution to Shanghai's economic power in the 19th and early 20th centuries.

Between 1950–1951, a movement sought to purge all revolutionaries that went against the ban on prostitution. The People's Court of Shanghai sentenced 200 people to death and over 7,000 people to suspended death sentences or life sentences. Many brothel owners were caught up in the purges; their punishment led to the closure of most brothels throughout the nation.

The government claimed by 1958 that prostitution had been eradicated, deemed venereal disease clinics unnecessary, and closed them all by 1965.

This changed as the Maoist period drew its close by 1976. During the reform and opening up, sex work returned in new forms. Rather than brothels, sex workers were found in dance halls, salons, barbershops, coffeehouses, train-stations, theaters, karaoke bars, and even parks. Much of the time, sex workers worked in their homes to avoid being caught. Technology at the end of the 20th century helped sex workers stay in touch with their clients.

The end of the 20th century was also met with many more migrants entering Shanghai. This played a major role in reigniting the sex industry and also led to trafficking and exploitation.

== Exploitation ==
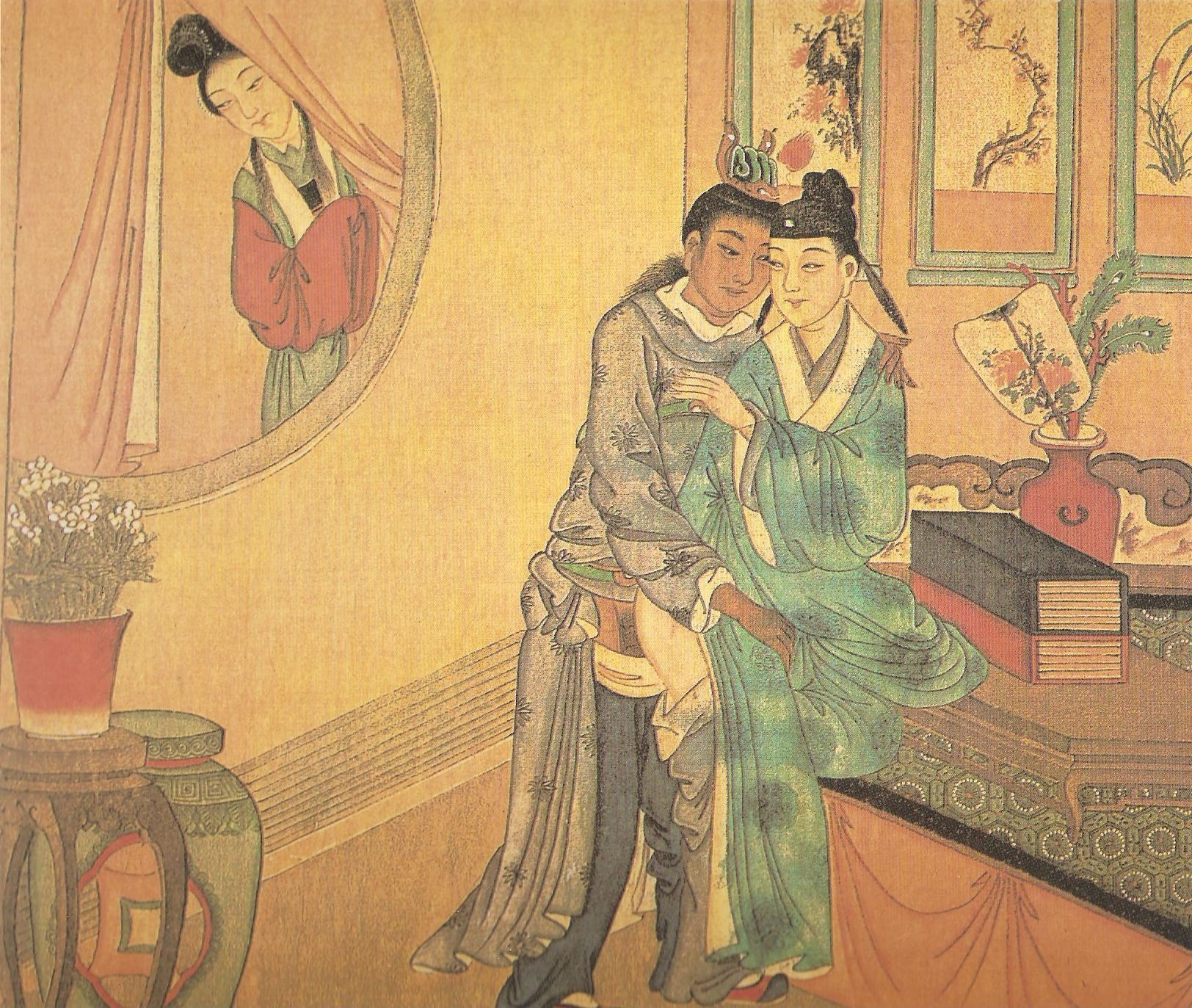
Male homosexual sex was commonly depicted in art and plays despite its shunning during the Maoist period. This particular painting predates Mao and is from the 18th century.

The addition of so many migrants entering Shanghai also came with the addition of increased sex trafficking and exploitation.

At the time, most of the sex trade took place at the consent of the woman and her family, typically because families were desperate and pressured in times of poverty.

However, kidnappings and abductions commonly took place as well. Stories of these occurring were very common. For example, the 1929 court case was brought against a woman named Zhou née Chen who had tried to trick two young teenage girls into working as servants with the intent to traffick them. Women were commonly used as abductors because they could allow other women and children to let their guard down, making the kidnappings relatively easier. During these abductions, women were raped by their abductors between sales.

Children of sex workers were brought up in these brothels and were even trained to do work, especially young girls. Clients would commonly pay more for young girls and virgins because the former believed that the latter were free from sexually transmitted infections.

Homosexuality was shunned, especially during the Maoist era, leading to male sex work being suppressed in the 19th and 20th centuries. Yet male sex work was still seen commonly throughout Chinese literature and art, and Sue Gronewold cited a study that showed that over a third of Chinese sex workers were male migrants.

In addition, transgender sex workers have little to no mention in historical documents in Shanghai. Like male sex workers, they were most likely harassed, abused, and treated harshly.

== Sex work hierarchy ==
Before sex work was outlawed in Shanghai, four major categories formed a sex work hierarchy.

At the top of the hierarchy were "storytellers". These high-class courtesans were entertainers and performed music, poetry, dance, and dramatics. They did not have sex with their clients and were typically only seen to be with scholar-officials.

Next in the hierarchy are "sing-song girls". These women were also high-class prostitutes that held parties, banquets, and wore costumes for officials and merchants. For these high-class courtesans, prostitution was not the main objective. Most of the revenue came from gambling, song requests, banquets, and gifts. Sex only played as a minor role in contributing to their revenue.

"Tea-house" prostitutes followed. These sex workers were more known to have sex with their clients rather than entertain them.

Finally, the remaining sex workers were called "wild chicks". Typically streetwalkers, they only performed sex with clients in brothels or other low-end locations.

== Lifestyle ==
The lifestyle of sex workers greatly depended on where they ranked on the sex work hierarchy. Poor streetwalkers, commonly desperate for money, sought out as many clients as they could. On the other side, higher class sex workers such as "sing-song girls" or "storytellers" would meet as many clients as they pleased typically ranging from one or two per day in high-end prostitute houses.

These prostitute houses would get "secondary" prostitutes to tend to the sexual needs of the high number of clientele and their demands. This allowed for their upper level counterparts to service only the best clients.

These prostitute houses were often run by a madam who oversaw the houses and the business. Madams would develop contractual relationships with prostitutes to allow for them to work in the houses. A small portion of prostitutes even became madams of their own houses towards the later parts of their careers.

Even after the 19th and 20th centuries, high-end sex workers continue to live in luxury, especially compared to their counterparts who work in "ten yuan" brothels (about $2 USD).

Sex workers on the lower end of the spectrum rely on a code of conduct and will only accept men who accept these rules. This helps protect the sex workers as much as possible from potentially dangerous clients.

Sex workers on the lower end of the spectrum that worked in collective houses had to meet a fixed goal of profit made based on their contract. If these women failed to meet their goal, they would be forced to make up the difference from their own personal funds.

In China, sex workers are overseen by "managers" who work the venues where the sex workers work—typically bars, clubs, and karaoke bars. Despite helping protect the sex workers, they nearly enslave them by preventing them from leaving their location of work.

For the prostitute houses, "guinu" were men who protected the house from any dangers that might occur. These men were typically lovers of the madam.
