= International Settlement =

International Settlement may refer to:

- International Settlement (San Francisco), a lost entertainment area of San Francisco which was prominent between the 1930s through the 1950s
- Shanghai International Settlement, territory in Shanghai leased to Britain and the United States in the 19th and early 20th centuries
- International Settlement (film), a 1938 American film set in the Shanghai International Settlement
