= Gail Hershatter =

American historian of Modern China

Gail Hershatter is an American historian of Modern China who holds the Distinguished Professor of History chair at the University of California, Santa Cruz. She previously taught in the history department at Williams College.

She graduated from Hampshire College with a B.A., from Stanford University with a M.A., and from Stanford University with a Ph.D. She was elected vice-president of the Association for Asian Studies in 2010 and subsequently elected president the following year. She was an assistant director for the documentary The Gate of Heavenly Peace.

== Research and views ==
Her research interests include modern Chinese women's history and labor studies. Her 2011 monograph, The Gender of Memory, uses the lens of rural women in Shaanxi Province, China, to examine revolutionary China in the 1950s and 1960s.

Discussing the academic focus on major campaigns of the People's Republic of China, Hershatter writes that an academic focus on "campaign time" fails to capture the reality of people's lived experiences in the history of China.

== Awards ==
- 1997 Joan Kelly Memorial Prize in Women's History, American Historical Association
- 2007 Guggenheim Fellow
- 2015 American Academy of Arts and Sciences

== Works ==
- Women and China's Revolutions, Rowman & Littlefield, 2019, ISBN 978-1-4422-1570-2
- The Gender of Memory: Rural Women and China's Collective Past, University of California Press, 2011, ISBN 978-0-520-26770-1
- The Workers of Tianjin, 1900–1949, Stanford University Press, 1986, ISBN 978-0-8047-2216-2
- Dangerous Pleasures: Prostitution and Modernity in Twentieth-Century Shanghai, University of California Press, 1997, ISBN 978-0-520-20438-6
- Women in China's long twentieth century, University of California Press, 2007, ISBN 978-0-520-09856-5
- Personal voices: Chinese women in the 1980's, Authors Emily Honig, Gail Hershatter, Stanford University Press, 1988, ISBN 978-0-8047-1431-0
- Remapping China: fissures in historical terrain, Editor Gail Hershatter, Stanford University Press, 1996, ISBN 978-0-8047-2509-5
- Guide to Women's Studies in China, editor Gail Hershatter, Institute of East Asian Studies, University of California, Berkeley, Center for Chinese Studies, 1998, ISBN 978-1-55729-063-2
- Engendering China: Women, Culture, and the State, Editor Christina K. Gilmartin, Harvard University Press, 1994, ISBN 978-0-674-25332-2.
