= Min Kuo Jih Pao =

1916–1947 Chinese-language daily newspaper

The Republican Daily News

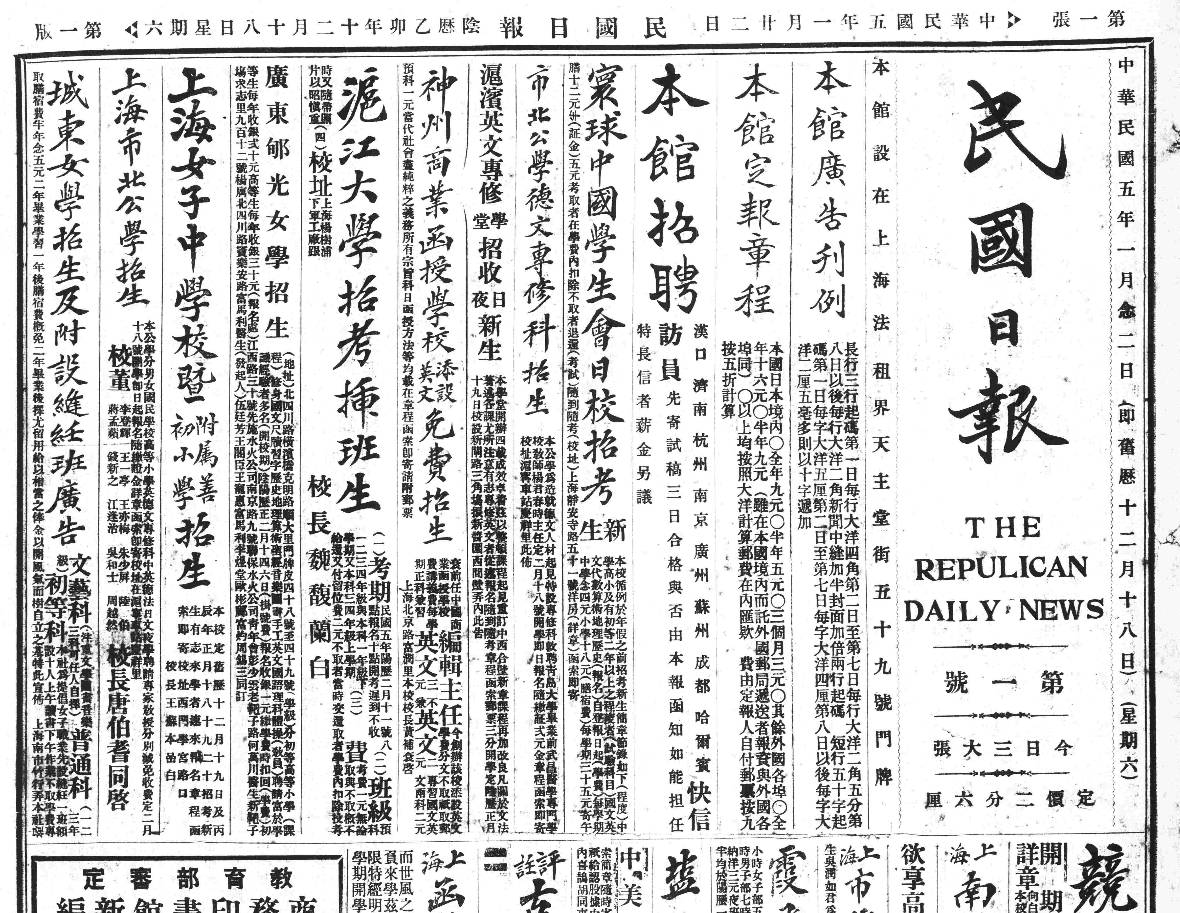
- The 22 January 1917 issue of the Min Kuo Jih Pao
- Native name: 民国日报
- Owner: Kuomintang (from 1924)
- Founder: Chen Qimei
- Editor-in-chief: Ye Chucan, Shao Lizi
- Founded: 22 January 1916
- Ceased publication: January 1932; 25 November 1937; 31 January 1947
- Relaunched: 4 May 1932; 6 October 1945
- Political alignment: Left-wing (until 1925); Right-wing (from 1925)
- Language: Chinese
- Headquarters: Shanghai French Concession
- City: Shanghai
- Country: Republic of China

Min Kuo Jih Pao
- Traditional Chinese: 民國日報
- Simplified Chinese: 民国日报
- Literal meaning: The Republican Daily News
Transcriptions
Standard Mandarin
- Hanyu Pinyin: Mínguó Rìbào
- Wade–Giles: Min kuo jih pao

The Min Kuo Jih Pao (Chinese: 民國日報), also known by its English-language name as The Republican Daily News, was a Chinese-language daily newspaper published from 1916 to 1947. It was founded in Shanghai by Chen Qimei and others on 22 January 1916, and had Ye Chucan and Shao Lizi as its chief editors. Initially, it served as the primary publication for the Chinese Revolutionary Party before transitioning to the official party newspaper of the Kuomintang (KMT). The newspaper pioneered a management model where the chief editor assumed full responsibility, breaking away from the traditional practice of newspaper operations being dominated by a managerial figure.

At its inception, the Min Kuo Jih Pao was dedicated to opposing Yuan Shikai, actively supporting the Constitutional Protection Movement, and criticising the Beiyang government. During the May Fourth Movement, it urged various sectors of society to strike and boycott in protest, adopting a radical stance in the subsequent New Culture Movement by exploring issues such as gender equality, women's liberation, and Marxism–Leninism. After Sun Yat-sen's death, control of the newspaper shifted to the Western Hills Group, leading to the Nationalist Party's central committee reorganising the paper in 1926. Following the 12 April incident, its editorial stance closely aligned with the Nanjing Nationalist Government. In 1932, the newspaper was shut down by the Public Concession authorities following Japanese accusations of disrespectful language towards the Emperor, becoming a catalyst for the January 28 incident. After the incident, it resumed publication as the Min Pao (simplified Chinese: 民报; traditional Chinese: 民報) until the 1937 Battle of Shanghai. Post-war, it was republished under the name Min Kuo Jih Pao until January 1947.

Between 1916 and 1932, the Shanghai-based Min Kuo Jih Pao had a significant impact on Chinese society and, along with Ta Kung Pao, Shun Pao, and Yi Shih Pao, was renowned as one of the "Four Major Newspapers of the Republic of China." Its supplement, "Awakening," was one of the four major supplements during the New Culture Movement. In the 1920s, numerous provincial, municipal, and county branches of KMT established local editions of the Min Kuo Jih Pao, making it the official organ of the local party branches.

== History ==
=== Opposition to Yuan Shikai ===
The Min Kuo Jih Pao was established on 22 January 1916 in the Shanghai French Concession by Chen Qimei and others, with Ye Chucan and Shao Lizi serving as its chief editors. It was the primary newspaper of the Chinese Revolutionary Party. At its launch, the newspaper's main objective was to oppose Yuan Shikai, and its inaugural editorial stated:

In the spring when autocratic tyranny is exposed, on the day when righteous forces rise throughout the land, we, the Min Kuo Jih Pao, solemnly present our first words to compatriots nationwide: Despotism leads inevitably to chaos, usurpation demands rightful punishment; complacency is not a strategy for safeguarding our land, and tolerance is not the path of righteousness. Today, as wounds fester and our realm teeters on the brink of collapse, with the source of our troubles not yet eradicated, and extinction looming, our compatriots furrow their brows in distress, a sentiment not new to this day. Yet, why do we still not rise in self-defence?

In subsequent reports, the newspaper continued to refer to Yuan as a "tyrant," describing his government as "evil" and criticising his attempt to restore the monarchy as "a treacherous theft of the nation." It mocked his ascension to the throne as a farcical "grand ascent," denouncing it as shameless. After Yuan's death, the paper continued to refer to him with derogatory terms such as "Yuan Shikai, whose evil deeds were fully accumulated," "Yuan the Rebel," and "Yuan the Thief," expressing a sense of relief at his death, believing it brought new vitality to the Chinese people. Following Yuan's failed attempt to declare himself emperor in March 1916, the Min Kuo Jih Pao actively supported the Protection Movement led by Sun Yat-sen, criticising the Beiyang warlord government. The paper referred to the Protection Army as "righteous troops" and published a series of articles titled "Chronicles of the Southwestern Righteous Army." It also featured special coverage on the third anniversary of the death of Tongmenghui elder and founding member of the KMT, Song Jiaoren, using the occasion to denounce Yuan's regime. Less than four months after its inception, on 18 May 1916, Chen Qimei, one of the founders of the newspaper, was assassinated in Shanghai.

=== New Culture Movement ===
During the May Fourth Movement, the Min Kuo Jih Pao supported the KMT opposition to various warlords with the aim of establishing a national government. On 6 May 1919, the Shanghai edition of the Min Kuo Jih Pao published a headline on the front page about the student movement in Beijing, namely the May Fourth Movement. It specially printed a portrait of Cao Rulin, labelling it with phrases such as "The Traitor Cao Rulin's Portrait" to express condemnation towards Cao Rulin. The paper also published a telegram from Beijing reporting "Zhang Zongxiang's serious injury and death" along with a short commentary titled "The End of a Traitor," referring to Zhang Zongxiang's death. However, Zhang Zongxiang had not died; on 7 May, the paper published another telegram, "Zhang Zongxiang Still Refuses to Die," reporting his revival after fainting at the Japan-China Friendship Hospital.

In 1922, to commemorate its sixth anniversary, the Min Kuo Jih Pao issued a special supplement titled "The New Construction of China," which introduced the Guangzhou Nationalist Government.

After the outbreak of the May Fourth Movement, Shao Lizi was invited to a tea party hosted by the Shanghai Student Union at the Carlton Cafe on Ningbo Road. He called for a citywide strike in Shanghai to support the student movement, and subsequently, the Min Kuo Jih Pao published an editorial titled "Make a Decision Quickly to Strike," urging all sectors of society to participate in strikes and boycotts to support the student movement. Inspired by the Min Kuo Jih Pao and other newspapers, nearly ten thousand people in Shanghai joined the strike and boycott movement in early June. The Min Kuo Jih Pao closely monitored the development of the May Fourth Movement in Jiangsu, providing continuous coverage. When news of the Chinese delegation's refusal to sign the Treaty of Versailles broke, the paper immediately published "The Wujiang Salvation Group's Telegram to the Delegates," expressing support and admiration for the refusal. Following this, the Min Kuo Jih Pao reported on activities in Jiangsu that responded to the May Fourth Movement, including student marches, speeches, the burning of Japanese goods, and protest activities in cities like Jintan, Suqian, Suzhou, Zhenjiang, Nantong, Xuzhou, and Huaian.

the Min Kuo Jih Pao was dedicated to promoting the New Culture Movement and supporting the labour movement, which led to repeated difficulties with the concession authorities. It was prosecuted by the police for "inciting public sentiment and disturbing public order," resulting in a court order from the Mixed Court to suspend publication for reorganisation. The newspaper also faced legal challenges for its reports on and support for the labour movement, being accused of "propagating extremism" and was instructed not to promote radical ideas. In September 1919, the Shanghai edition of the Min Kuo Jih Pao published an article titled "Explanation of the Anfu Clan Genealogy," which exposed the dictatorship and treasonous activities of the Anfu Club, leading to accusations of "insulting the President and officials in office." Despite vigorous defence by its lawyers in the subsequent legal proceedings, the newspaper was not found guilty. However, its manager, Shao Lizi, and chief editor, Ye Chucan, were each fined 100 silver dollars.

=== Northern Expedition ===
In 1924, the Min Kuo Jih Pao issued a supplement titled "Comment on Comments"

The First National Congress of the KMT, held in January 1924, marked the beginning of the First United Front between the KMT and the Chinese Communist Party (CCP). After this congress, the Min Kuo Jih Pao became the official organ of the Central Committee of the KMT, with a circulation reaching up to 9,000 copies daily, primarily among students and KMT members. In February 1924, Qu Qiubai arrived in Shanghai and participated in the reorganisation of the KMT's Shanghai Executive Department and the Min Kuo Jih Pao. Following its reorganisation, the newspaper began to display a clear revolutionary orientation in its political stance, vigorously defending the declarations of the KMT's First Congress, the national workers' movement, the anti-imperialist movement, and support for the Soviet Union. This stance led to suspicion and opposition from the right-wing faction within the KMT, with some accusing the Min Kuo Jih Pao of becoming a mouthpiece for the Communist Party, and Qu Qiubai being suspected of being an "executive member of the Russian Communist Party within the KMT."

Ye Chucan was elected as a member of the Central Executive Committee at the KMT's First Congress and soon served as the Minister of Propaganda. After Sun Yat-sen's death, Ye Chucan later joined the Western Hills Conference, causing the Min Kuo Jih Pao to gradually become the mouthpiece of the Western Hills Conference faction. The newspaper shifted its stance, publishing numerous anti-communist articles and openly opposing cooperation between the KMT and the CCP. The right-wing forces within the KMT grew, leading to the marginalization of the KMT's left-wing and Communist members within the Min Kuo Jih Pao. By the end of 1925, the newspaper was completely controlled by the right-wing Western Hills Conference faction.

In January 1926, the Second National Congress of the KMT passed a resolution to discipline individuals like Ye Chucan and ordered that the newspaper "be handed over for reorganisation or complete change of attitude." The Central Executive Committee of the KMT in Guangzhou declared the newspaper to be occupied by reactionary elements, with absurd discussions and greatly deviating from the party's principles. It cut off the newspaper's funding, leading to its suspension for reorganisation on 26 October. The newspaper resumed publication on 7 November, announcing its break from the control of the Western Hills faction, its support for Sun Yat-sen and the Guangzhou National Government, and its advocacy for the National Revolution. On 10 January 1927, due to the Northern Expedition and opposition from Sun Chuanfang, who then controlled Shanghai, the newspaper was suspended again. When the Northern Expedition forces reached Shanghai on 21 March, the newspaper immediately resumed publication. The KMT's Special Municipal Party Committee in Shanghai and the Eastern Route Army Command of the National Revolutionary Army declared it as their official organ, making it the first news and propaganda institution established by the KMT in Shanghai.

=== Propaganda for Chiang Kai-shek ===
After the 12 April Coup in 1927, Chen Dewei became the chief editor of the Min Kuo Jih Pao. The newspaper transitioned into a propaganda tool for the Nanjing government led by Chiang Kai-shek. In 1930, Chen Dewei organised a public opinion survey to "elect the greatest Chinese personality," where he emerged first, ahead of Chiang, who was ranked second. This result greatly displeased Chiang, and consequently, in the autumn of 1930, Chen was detained in Nanjing. Although later released on bail by Wu Jingheng, Chen was demoted and relegated to a position from which he could never be reinstated. After Chen left the Min Kuo Jih Pao, Yan Shenyu took over as the newspaper's main person in charge. Between 1927 and 1932, the newspaper's political commentary was highly aligned with the Nanjing government, adopting anti-Soviet and anti-Communist stances, and participated in propaganda against the Guangxi and Guangdong factions, the Fengtian clique, and the reorganisationists.

In 1929, Fudan University professor Hong Shen, after watching the American film Welcome Danger at the Grand Guangming Theater in Shanghai, took the stage inside the cinema to vehemently denounce the movie for insulting China and called for a boycott. Consequently, he was detained by the police. After his release, Hong Shen sued in court and published articles in the Min Kuo Jih Pao calling for a boycott, leading to the film's lead actor issuing a public apology to the Chinese people in American newspapers, banning the film's screening in other Chinese cities, and forcing the Grand Guangming Theater to publicly apologise to Hong Shen.

=== Forced shutdown ===
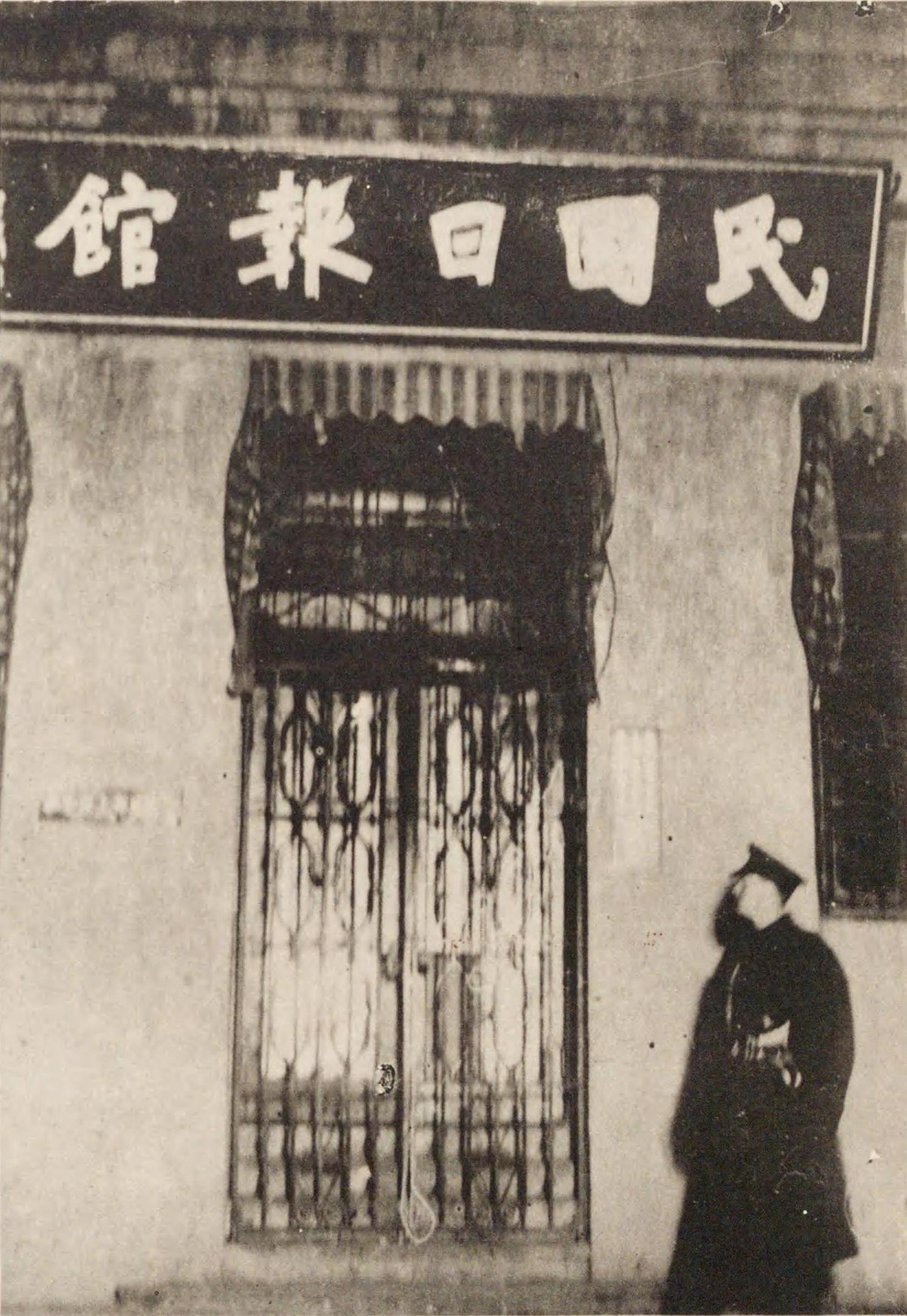
Min Kuo Jih Pao's Shanghai office closed by the police of Shanghai International Settlement

On January 8, 1932, a Korean individual attempted to assassinate the Japanese Emperor with a hand grenade during a military inspection in Tokyo's Yoyogi area. The Min Kuo Jih Pao reported on this incident, with the headline on the unsuccessful attempt to kill the Japanese Emperor and a subtitle that read "Unfortunately, Only the Secondary Car Was Damaged." The Japanese perceived this as an insult to the Emperor and were highly dissatisfied. The Japanese Consulate in Shanghai lodged multiple complaints with the Chinese side, demanding severe punishment and an apology.

Faced with threats from the Japanese side and pressure from the Nationalist Government, the Min Kuo Jih Pao ultimately decided to comply with the Japanese demands, sending a representative of the newspaper to personally offer both verbal and written apologies to the Japanese Marine Corps. The Japanese side claimed to reject the apology, demanding the closure of the Min Kuo Jih Pao, and threatened the Shanghai Municipal Council that if the Council did not take action against the newspaper, the Marine Corps would close down the Council itself. In a board meeting held in the absence of the Chinese directors, the Council decided to shut down the premises of the Min Kuo Jih Pao.

On January 27, following the Japanese demand to suspend the Min Kuo Jih Pao, the Chinese Foreign Minister Chen Youren and Sun Ke resigned in protest. On January 28, Japanese forces began invading Shanghai. On January 29, the Japanese government issued a statement claiming that the incident was triggered by anti-Japanese movements in China, specifically citing the Min Kuo Jih Pao' publication of disrespectful content towards the Japanese imperial family as one of the pretexts for the invasion.

=== Loss of influence ===
On May 4, 1932, the newspaper was relaunched as Min Pao with Ye Chucan as its backer, receiving subsidies from the Central Publicity Department of KMT. It ceased publication on November 25, 1937, due to the fall of Shanghai to Japanese hand.

Following the surrender of Japan in 1945, the Min Kuo Jih Pao was approved for republication by the KMT's Central Publicity Department on October 6, 1945. In its early days after resuming publication, the Min Kuo Jih Pao managed to maintain its operations, especially as other newspapers like Shen Bao and Xinwen Bao were undergoing reorganisation. However, entering 1946, the newspaper struggled to sustain itself, with circulation falling below a thousand copies and frequently operating on borrowed funds. It finally ceased publication on January 31, 1947.
