= Suicide of Xi Shangzhen =

The suicide of Xi Shangzhen took place in September 1922 on Fuzhou Road in Shanghai, China. Xi, a 24-year-old female clerk, was found hanged in the office of The Journal of Commerce, where she worked. The incident triggered a wave of public debate in the media and other public spaces in Shanghai. Xi had been involved in a financial dispute over securities with her employer, Tang Jiezhi, and rumors suggested that Tang intended to take her as a concubine. As a result, public opinion largely held Tang Jiezhi responsible for her death.

Tang Jiezhi was the founder of The Journal of Commerce and a prominent figure in Shanghai's securities industry. He had also been active in the May Fourth Movement of 1919. Known for advocating social reforms—including the employment of women—his involvement in the suicide case of his female employee, Xi Shangzhen, drew heightened public attention. Moreover, the incident took place within the Shanghai International Settlement, an enclave primarily controlled by the British and Americans, and thus outside the jurisdiction of Chinese law at the time. Nevertheless, Tang Jiezhi was arrested by the Chinese authorities and convicted of “fraud,” which further sparked public debate over the functioning of China's legal system.

== Background ==
=== The May Fourth New Culture Movement and women's emancipation ===
The suicide of Xi Shangzhen in 1922 occurred only a few years after the May Fourth Movement of 1919. Prior to this period, traditional Confucian doctrines—such as the “Three Fundamental Bonds and Five Constant Virtues” (san gang wu chang) and the “Three Obediences and Four Virtues” (san cong si de)—had long imposed rigid constraints on Chinese women. World War I(1914–1918), the development of capitalism in China accelerated the disintegration of traditional small-scale household production. As a result, increasing numbers of women, like their male counterparts, were compelled to leave the domestic sphere and enter the labor market under capitalist employment. In 1915, the New Culture Movement began to foreground the issue of women's emancipation, with prominent intellectuals such as Chen Duxiu, Li Dazhao, and Lu Xun actively engaging in the discourse. This ideological foundation laid the groundwork for the heightened participation of women in the protests and struggles of the 1919 May Fourth Movement.In the aftermath of the movement, new sociocultural trends emerged advocating gender equality and mutual respect. Consequently, some higher education institutions in major cities such as Beijing began to admit female students, signaling a gradual transformation in the status of women in Chinese society.

=== "The Founding of the Shanghai Shangbao" ===
"Shortly after its launch, in the autumn of the same year, the Shangbao ranked third in newspaper circulation in China, surpassed only by Shenbao and Xinwen Bao.""The rise of the Shangbao was closely associated with its U.S.-educated founder, Tang Jie-zhi, whose international background attracted numerous prominent writers to serve as editors, among them the influential commentator Chen Bread.""Tang Jie-zhi, the founder, had played a prominent role in rallying merchants during the early phase of the May Fourth Movement. He also served as a board member of the Shanghai Chamber of Commerce, a key figure in the Guangzhao Gongsuo, and chairman of several commercial federations. These roles and connections enabled his newspaper to offer readers insights into the broader patterns of industrial and commercial development across China."

=== "The 'New Woman' Xi Shangzhen in the Shangbao" ===
In the case of Xi Shangzhen's suicide, the central figure, Xi Shangzhen, was one of the female staff members at the Shangbao. A graduate of the Chengdong Girls’ School in Shanghai, she belonged to the emerging class of “New Women” who had received a modern, Western-style education. Through the recommendation of a relative, she secured a position at the Shangbao as a clerical assistant. Her responsibilities included opening correspondence sent from various sources and passing it to the general manager, Tang Jie-zhi, for review. Afterward, she would distribute the letters to the appropriate departments. She earned a monthly salary of 20 yuan. On September 8, 1922, Xi Shangzhen died by hanging at the offices of the Shangbao at the age of 24. Prior to this, she had reportedly attempted suicide twice by ingesting poison. Her death was widely believed to be linked to disputes over stock investments and verbal humiliation she had suffered from Tang Jie-zhi.

=== Shanghai Stock Exchange ===
In the second half of 1921, approximately 136 to 150 stock exchanges were established and operating in Shanghai—an astonishing number that far exceeded that of any other place in the world at the time. Against this historical backdrop, the deceased, Xi Shangzhen, also had a habit of investing. However, by early 1922, nearly all of Shanghai's stock exchanges were on the verge of collapse. Resulting in substantial financial losses for Xi Shangzhen. The rapid growth of Shanghai's stock exchanges between 1920 and 1921 was driven by the city's economic expansion, the existence of concessions and leases in international relations (which granted extraterritorial privileges), and the financial demands of nationalist revolutionary movements.

=== The Shanghai International Settlement and extraterritoriality ===
The location of Xi Shangzhen's suicide—the offices of the Shangbao shangbao—was situated within the Shanghai International Settlement, which had been jointly established by United Kingdom and the United States in 1863. The history of the settlement's establishment can be traced back to the Treaty of Nanking, signed after the First Opium War (1839–1842). Under foreign pressure, China's sovereignty was severely curtailed through concrete measures such as the establishment of foreign concessions and the granting of extraterritorial rights, including Consular court to the imperial powers. In the 1920s, the Mixed Court (Huishen Gongxie), which investigated the case of Xi Shangzhen, was a judicial institution established within this very context.

== History ==
=== The incident ===
At the Shangbao, where Xi Shangzhen worked, it was customary for the staff to dine together around 5 p.m. On the evening of September 8, 1922, when Xi failed to appear for dinner, a senior employee, Wang Jipu, went to check on her. Xi said she was feeling unwell and had no appetite, and she declined the suggestion to go home early. As a result, Wang instructed a subordinate to inform her family.

Xi Shangzhen, who was unmarried, lived with her family. At around 6 p.m., when they received news of her feeling unwell, they were in the middle of dinner and did not respond immediately. Over an hour later, her family arrived at the office, only to find the door locked. They requested assistance from the building's guard to open it. Upon entering, they were confronted with the harrowing sight of Xi Shangzhen hanging by the window, her body gently swaying. A physician summoned from Renji Hospital arrived shortly thereafter and pronounced her dead at approximately 8 p.m. Her employer, Tang Jie-zhi, was not present during the entire incident.

Although nearly all of the staff at the Shangbao were Chinese, according to a police report preserved in the Shanghai Municipal Archives, the person who called to report the incident to the authorities in the International Settlement was George Sokolsky, a Russian-American journalist.

=== Investigation and findings ===
After George Sokolsky filed a report, the Mixed Court in the International Settlement began an investigation into the death of Xi Shangzhen. The Mixed Court was a special tribunal established within the foreign concessions to reconcile extraterritorial privileges with Chinese law, with judges composed of officials from multiple nations.

In the case of Xi Shangzhen's death, judges at the Shanghai International Settlement's Mixed Court concluded it was a suicide, based on testimonies from the police, coroner, and eyewitnesses. However, the accounts of the key parties involved regarding the events leading up to Xi Shangzhen's death were inconsistent.

Nonetheless, the court's role was not to reconcile these conflicting statements. The ruling stated that if Xi Shangzhen's family wished to seek financial compensation, they could file a civil lawsuit against Tang Jiezhi. In addition, the court granted Xi Shangzhen's mother's request to have the body transported to the Dongting Dongshan Guild Hall, also known as Sanshantang. arrange the funeral.

=== Public opinion ===
In order to distance himself from responsibility, Tang Jiezhi, starting on September 11, began publishing a "Critical Statement by Tang Jiezhi" in the advertisement sections of major newspapers such as Shen Bao and The News under the approval of his lawyer.

The statement is as follows: ...her employer, 湯節之, and rumors suggested that Tang intended to take her as a concubine.

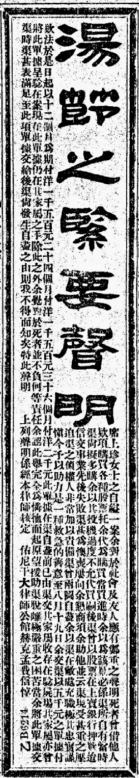
湯節之緊要聲明Critical Statement by Tang Jiezhi

Regarding the suicide of Miss Xi Shangzhen, I feel obliged to make a solemn statement to society and to my friends.

The deceased had borrowed funds from others to purchase various stocks and entrusted me with making the purchases on her behalf. At the time of the transactions, I believed the funds were her own. She intended to invest further, but I, thinking she was becoming overly speculative, refused to act on her behalf. Later, she pawned grain at the Shangbao Bank to raise funds.

After the collapse of her trust-related business ventures, she was deeply distressed and repeatedly appealed to me for help. She told me she was under tremendous pressure and that her creditors were severely reproaching her. She had attempted suicide twice before. As she was employed at my firm and had always been loyal and conscientious, I offered assistance out of compassion.

On August 19, I issued her a promissory note worth five thousand yuan. The repayment terms were as follows: 1,500 yuan to be repaid after twelve months, another 1,500 yuan after twenty-four months, and the remaining 2,000 yuan after thirty-six months. This note was handed over to her family prior to her suicide and was presented at the coroner's inquest by her family. The note remains in the possession of her family to this day.

Aside from this, I believe I bear no other responsibility toward the deceased. My actions were motivated solely by compassion, in the hope of helping her out of extreme hardship. When I gave her the note, she expressed great satisfaction. As for the reasons that led her to take her life after receiving the note, I do not know. I make this statement with all due seriousness.

The above statement has been reviewed and approved by my attorney.

Tang Jiezhi

At the law office of Attorney Unican, certified by Hekeman and Feixindun

Published in Shen Bao, September 11, 1922, Page 1.

Since the "Critical Statement by Tang Jiezhi" was a paid advertisement, such statements typically carry only limited credibility. In contrast to the paid advertisement, the Dongting Dongshan Native Association, which supported Xi Shangzhen, published statements seeking "justice for the deceased" in the form of news reports in major newspapers. Xi Shangzhen's mother and sister primarily accused Tang Jiezhi of borrowing money from Xi on May 3, 1921—a year before the incident—and failing to repay it. They also alleged that he insultingly asked Xi Shangzhen to marry him as a concubine. In response to these accusations, Tang Jiezhi refuted the claim that he had borrowed money, stating that he merely received the funds to purchase stocks on Xi Shangzhen's behalf. He also strongly denied the allegation that he intended to take Xi Shangzhen as a concubine.

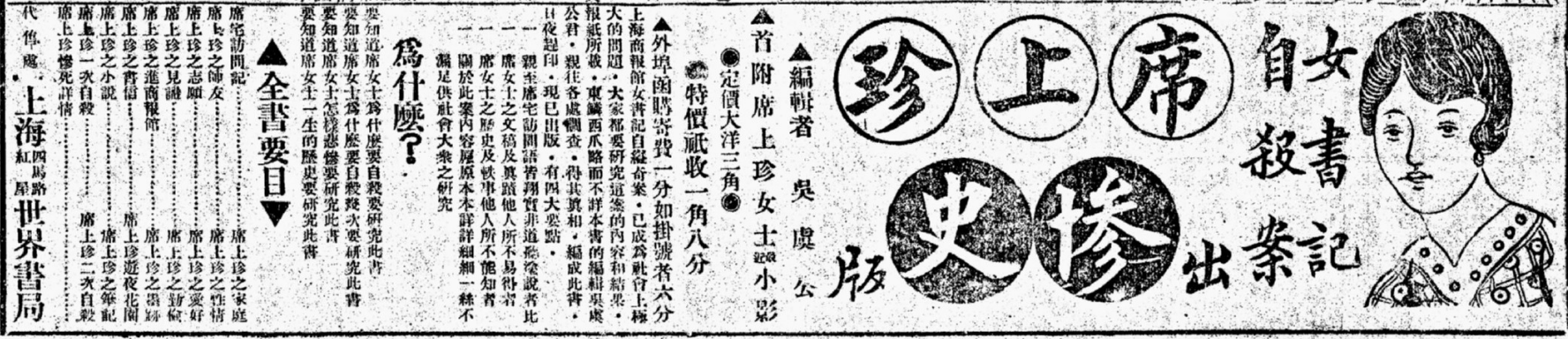
《女書記之自殺：席上珍慘史》廣告The Suicide of the Female Secretary: The Tragic Story of Xi Shangzhen

The news coverage of Xi Shangzhen's suicide sparked a continuous stream of public commentary on the incident.

Xi Shangzhen's death gave rise to over a hundred articles and led to the publication of three books, reflecting its commercial value—for example, The Suicide of the Female Secretary: The Tragic Story of Xi Shangzhen. Chinese intellectuals from various circles, including Chen Wangdao and Zheng Zhengqiu, actively voiced their opinions on the matter, shaping public discourse.

=== Tang Jiezhi's arrest and trial ===
November 11, 1922 Tang Jiezhi was secretly arrested, and the incident was not reported until the 13th, as seen in publications such as Shen Bao. Tang Jiezhi's residence, like the Commercial Gazette building, was located within the Shanghai International Settlement and fell under the jurisdiction of the Mixed Court and the Settlement police. From the standpoint of extraterritoriality, the execution of an arrest warrant by a Chinese court within the Settlement was considered an unlawful intrusion into the area. In response, the Chinese police explained that Tang Jiezhi's bodyguard had parked the car at the boundary between the Settlement and Chinese territory. At 2 a.m. on the 11th, as Tang Jiezhi stepped out of the car, he and his bodyguard were immediately subdued and detained by Chinese police. The Weekly Review of the Far East compared this unusual arrest to the “Lo Wen-kan case” from the same year, suggesting the possibility of a political conspiracy. During the initial hearing at the Chinese court, the Guangzhou and Zhaoqing Guild Hall submitted a request for bail, which was denied by the court. Ultimately, Tang Jiezhi was convicted of fraud and sentenced to three years in prison.

=== Subsequent developments ===
After Tang Jiezhi's arrest, the Commercial Gazette was sold. By the time he returned to Shanghai, the environment had changed drastically from the early 1920s, leaving him with virtually no room to exert political influence. The once-sensational “Xi Shangzhen suicide case” had also faded into obscurity. In 1929, Shanghai Pictorial published an article titled "Tang Jiezhi’s Comeback," reporting that he might take over the Greater China Department Store, which was under construction at the former site of the Hongmiao Temple on Nanjing Road in Shanghai. Regarding Tang Jiezhi's past, the magazine stated: “As for Mr. Tang’s history, it is well known in great detail, and we have, at times, even spoken in his defense.”

== Influence on scholarly research ==
=== Changes in gender relations after the establishment of the democratic republic ===
Professor Bryna Goodman of the University of Oregon’s Department of History outlines the transformations in gender relations since the founding of the Republic of China in 1912. Through the suicide of the “new woman” Xi Shangzhen, she deepens the understanding of the subtle complexities within these changes.

=== The public discourse surrounding women’s cases: “metonymy” of moral Issues among Intellectual communities ===
Dai Beifen's research found that, among the reports published in Shen Bao from 1920 to 1937, the cases of Wang Lianying, Xi Shangzhen, Huang Huiru, and Xiao Xin’an were the four most prominent female-related legal news stories that drew significant media attention. Except for the famous courtesan Wang Lianying, the other three were all “new women” who had received higher education and possessed independent financial means. The incidents surrounding these “new women” all stemmed from real-life challenges they faced in the process of stepping out of traditional family structures and pursuing a modern lifestyle.

At first glance, the case of Xi Shangzhen appeared to stem from failed investments, but under the influence of public discourse, it was transformed into a moral issue concerning educated women or a problem of national education. In her master's thesis at Northwest University of China, Li Guangqun draws on Wang Fansen's concept of “metonymy” to explain how the Xi Shangzhen incident reflects the intellectual tendency to attribute personal struggles to broader societal conditions—turning individual suffering into clearly defined and explainable causes.

=== The boundary between “new” and “old” women: vanity ===
After Xi Shangzhen's suicide by hanging, Zha Mengci published his views on women's education under the title "The Flaws in Women's Education Revealed by Miss Xi’s Suicide Case" in the “Women and Family” section of Zhonghua Xinbao (China New Daily).Through this case,Zha Mengciargued that women's education in China amounted to nothing more than “ornamental education” or “entertainment education,” failing to cultivate women capable of independently striving in society. He believed that Xi Shangzhen's death was caused by her “vanity,” which made her vulnerable to deception by speculators. Furthermore, her impulsive suicide over 5,000 yuan was, in his view, a sign of “severe neurasthenia.”Overall,Zha Mengcicontended that it was “vanity” and “weakness” that led to Xi Shangzhen's suicide, and that these were also the deeper flaws of modern women's education. For women to achieve true independence, he argued, they must combine modern scientific education with the hardworking, contented spirit of rural women from the interior.

In rebuttal to Zha Mengci’s views,Huang Qinghua published an article titled “What Is Zhonghua Xinbao Talking About?” in the “Qingguang” column of Shishi Xinbao (Current Affairs News).In the article, Huang Qinghua speculated that Xi Shangzhen's suicide was “half due to the 5,000 yuan, and half due to the humiliation of Tang Jiezhi wanting to take her as a concubine.”[Huang Qinghua] believed that her death was an innocent one. In his study of suicide in twentieth-century China, Haiqing pointed out that the core of this debate lay in the use of "vanity" as an analytical lens for female character—one that shifted women in gendered relationships from the position of victims to that of deliberate co-conspirators.
