= He Jian =

Chinese Nationalist (KMT) general and politician

General 2nd Rank He Jian
- 何鍵
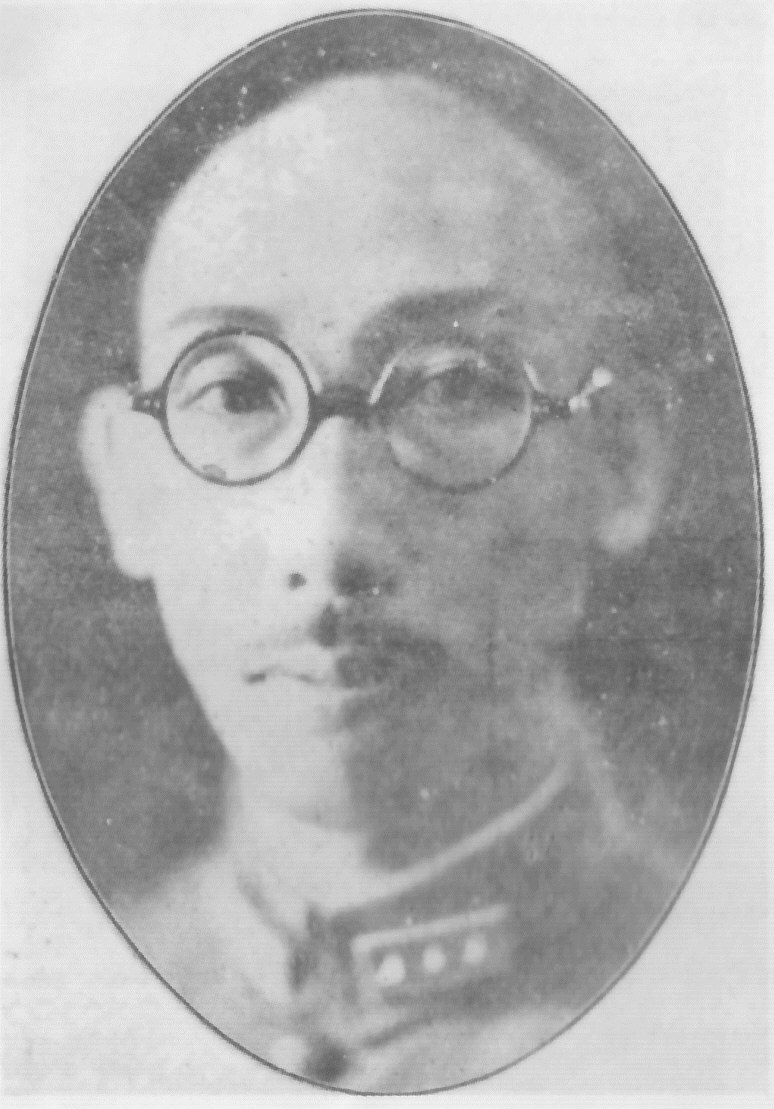
- He Jian

National Policy Advisor
- In office 1950–1956
- President: Chiang Kai-shek

Interior Minister of the Republic of China
- In office November 1937 – May 1939
- Preceded by: Chiang Tso-pin (蔣作賓)
- Succeeded by: Chou Chung-yueh (周鐘岳)

Governor of Hunan
- In office March 1929 – November 1937
- Preceded by: Lu Diping
- Succeeded by: Zhang Zhizhong

Personal details
- Born: April 10, 1887 Liling, Hunan, China
- Died: April 25, 1956 (aged 69) Taipei, Taiwan, Republic of China
- Party: Kuomintang
- Children: He Lian (daughter); Tang Fei-fan (son-in-law)
- Parent: He Qishan (father)
- Education: Baoding Military Academy
- Occupation: Politician, military officer

Military service
- Allegiance: Republic of China
- Branch/service: Republic of China Army
- Years of service: 1916–1956
- Rank: General 2nd Rank
- Battles/wars: Northern Expedition; Second Sino-Japanese War; Chinese Civil War

He Jian (simplified Chinese: 何键; traditional Chinese: 何鍵; pinyin: Hé Jiàn; Wade–Giles: Ho Chien; 10 April 1887 – 25 April 1956) was a Chinese Nationalist (KMT) general and politician in the Republic of China. He was governor of Hunan province between 1929 and 1937, and Interior Minister from 1937 to 1939. He was best known for fighting the Communists, and he once ordered his subordinates to execute Yang Kaihui (Mao Zedong's wife) and Wu Ruolan (Zhu De's wife).

== Names ==
His courtesy name was Yunqiao (雲樵) and his art name was Rongyuan (容園).

== Biography ==
=== Education ===
He Jian was born into a family of farming background in Liling County, Hunan, on April 10, 1887. In 1903 he attended Zhuzici School (朱子祠小學) and then transferred to Liling County Lujiang Middle School (醴陵縣立渌江中學). In 1906 he enrolled at Chonggu School (崇古學堂) and three years later he studied at Hunan Public Law School (湖南法政學堂). After the outbreak of the Xinhai Revolution, he was educated in Wuchang Army High School. After graduating from Baoding Military Academy in 1916 he was assigned to the 1st Brigade of 1st Division of Hunan Ground Force.

=== Northern Expedition ===
In March 1918, Zhang Jingyao attacked Hunan, He Jian threw down his arms and fled the field. He returned to his hometown and rebuilt an guerrilla forces. In May, Cheng Qian, the commander-in-chief of Xiang Army, commissioned him as commander of Liuyang-Liling guerrilla forces. In 1919, Tang Shengzhi incorporated his army and he became a brigade commander. He joined the Kuomintang and took part in the Northern Expedition. After Wuhan was captured he was promoted to army commander of the 35th Army.

=== Encirclement and suppression ===
In April 1927 he fought against Zhang Zuolin's army in Hebei. At the same time, Communist revolutionaries Guo Liang, Liu Zhixun (later purged by Xia Xi and executed), and Xia Xi in alliance with Kuomintang leftist pressed ahead with rural land reform in Hunan, this incident lead to intensification of the contradictions between the Communist Party and the Kuomintang. On May 21, 1927, the Mari Incident broke out, and He Jian began a crack down on the Communists.

In November 1928, the Nationalist government commissioned him as commander-in-chief of Hunan-Jiangxi Bandit Suppression Headquarters. His army marched towards the Jinggangshan Revolutionary Base. The Red Army were defeated and fled to the Central Soviet Base Area.

In 1929, he was appointed governor of Hunan province. That same year, his subordinates arrested and then executed Wu Ruolan, wife of Communist military leader Zhu De.

In 1930, as the Communist Party sent troops to attack Changsha, He Jian's car was destroyed during conflict. In reprisal, he participated in the "encirclement and suppression" led by Chiang Kai-shek and He Yingqin in Jiangxi. On November 14, his subordinates executed Yang Kaihui (Mao Zedong's wife) in Changsha.

In 1933, the Nationalist government commissioned him as commander-in-chief of the West Route Army.

=== Second Sino-Japanese War ===
He was Interior Minister in 1937 and chairman of Military Committee in 1939.

=== Chinese Civil War ===
After the Second Sino-Japanese War, he resigned from his post because of illness. He recuperated at Heng Mountain, in Hengyang.

He Jian relocated to British Hong Kong in the Spring of 1949 and one year later he settled down in Taipei, Taiwan. He served as national policy advisor to the President Chiang Kai-shek until his death.

On April 25, 1956, He Jian died of cerebral hemorrhage in Taipei.

== Personal life ==
He had a daughter, He Lian, who was married to Tang Fei-fan, a virologist best known for culturing the Chlamydia trachomatis agent in the yolk sacs of eggs.

Government offices
Preceded by Lu Diping	Governor of Hunan; 1929–1937	Succeeded by Zhang Zhizhong
Preceded by Chiang Tso-pin (蔣作賓)	Interior Minister of the Republic of China; 1937–1939	Succeeded by Chou Chung-yueh (周鐘岳)
