= Shutdown of the Min-kuo Jih-pao =

Incident in 1932 in Shanghai

Shutdown of the Min-Kuo Jih-pao
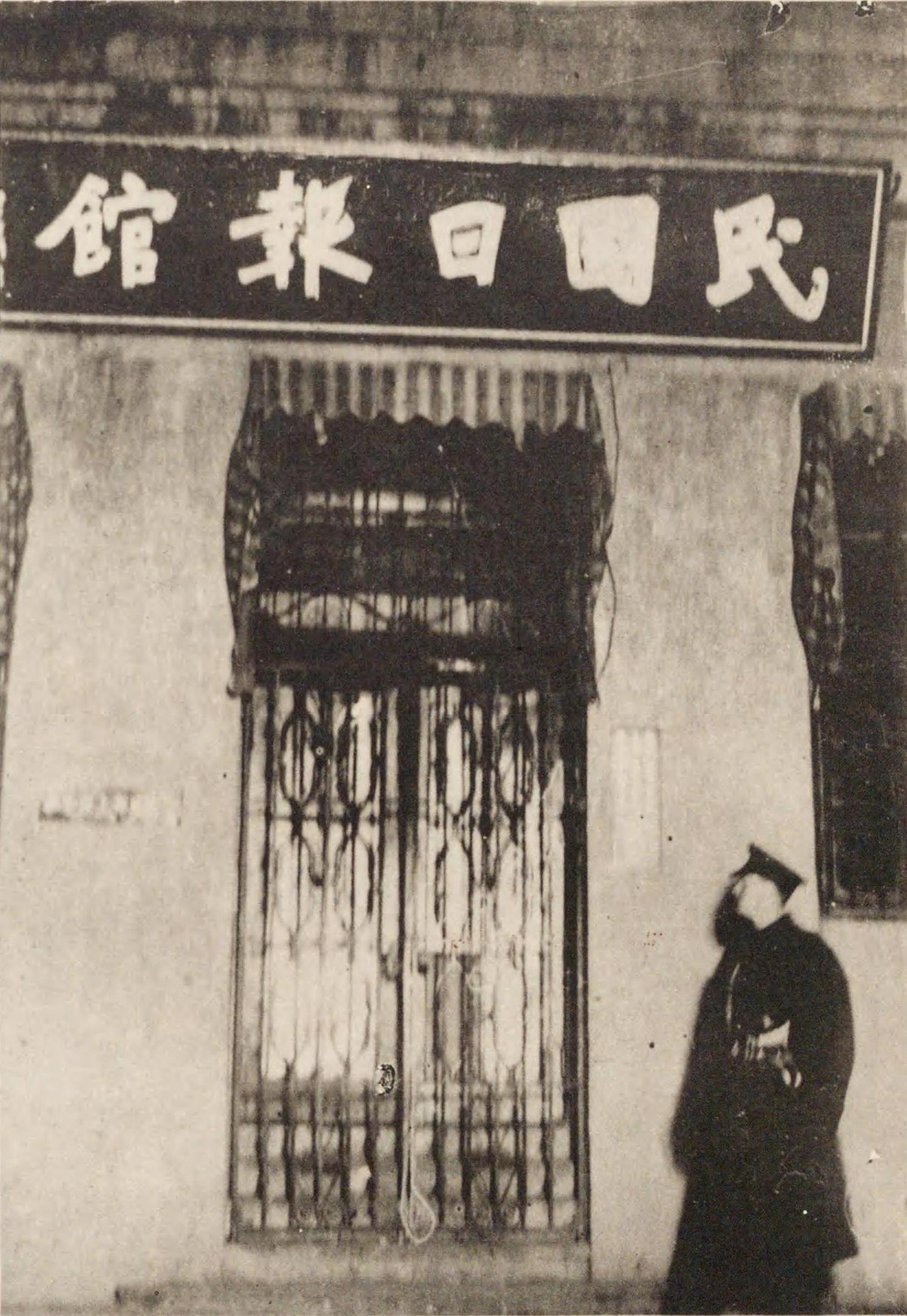
- Min-kuo Jih-pao office after shutdown
- Date: January 1932
- Location: Shanghai, China

The shutdown of the Min-Kuo Jih-pao, the official newspaper of Kuomintang (KMT) in Shanghai, took place in January 1932, after its coverage of the Sakuradamon Incident and the Japanese monk incident irritated the Japanese marines stationed in Shanghai, as well as the Japanese government. The Japanese marines accused the newspaper of making false and disrespectful reporting and demanded an apology from the newspaper, issuing a final ultimatum. While the newspaper submitted to this ultimatum, with pressure from the Japanese marines, the Shanghai International Settlement's Municipal Council forced the newspaper to be closed on January 26, 1928.

== Background ==
The Min-kuo Jih-pao, also known as the Republican Daily News, launched in 1916 within the French Concession and later moved to the International Settlement in Shanghai. The newspaper was known for its timely reporting and sharp commentary. After 1924, it became the party newspaper of KMT. Following the Northern Expedition in 1927, which overthrew the Beiyang government, the KMT's Shanghai Branch declared the paper an official publication. At that time, the KMT Central Committee's official newspaper was Central Daily News. After the Mukden Incident of 1931, the Japanese soldiers began picking querrels in Shanghai, attempting to shift international attention from Manchuria.

== Early conflicts ==
On January 8, 1932, the Japanese Emperor Shōwa was targeted by a grenade attack by Korean independence activist Lee Bong-chang during a military inspection in Yoyogi, Tokyo, an event reported by the Min-kuo Jih-pao. The paper's headline about the unsuccessful assassination attempt by a Korean youth, with the subheading "Unfortunately, only the secondary car was damaged", was seen by the Japanese as an insult to the Emperor, leading to significant discontent.

The Japanese consulate in Shanghai lodged multiple complaints with the Chinese side, demanding severe punishment and an apology. The Japanese claimed the report was a grave disrespect to the Emperor and demanded the Chinese government to investigate the Min-kuo Jih-pao. On January 12, the Japanese Consul General in Shanghai issued a strong protest, demanding the newspaper to correct its report and apologise, and to punish those responsible. To prevent further escalation, Shanghai Mayor Wu Tiecheng ordered the Min-kuo Jih-pao to retract the report.

== Escalation ==
=== Ultimatum ===
On 20 January, Japanese right-wing activists set fire to the main factory of the San You Industrial Society in Shanghai's Yinxiang Port, an event reported by the Min-kuo Jih-pao under the headline 'Japanese ronin burn down San You factory under the cover of the Marine Corps'. The Japanese Navy Marine Corps claimed that they had been sent to the scene only after receiving reports, accusing the Min-kuo Jih-pao of publishing false information. On the morning of 22 January, a Japanese naval officer in military uniform, accompanied by a translator, visited the Min-kuo Jih-pao office to meet with the editor-in-chief. They protested against an article published by the Min-kuo Jih-pao about an attempted assassination of the Japanese emperor, and demanded that the newspaper apologise to the Marine Corps headquarters in Shanghai with a personal letter of apology. The Japanese Navy Marine Corps issued an ultimatum with a deadline of the morning of the following day.

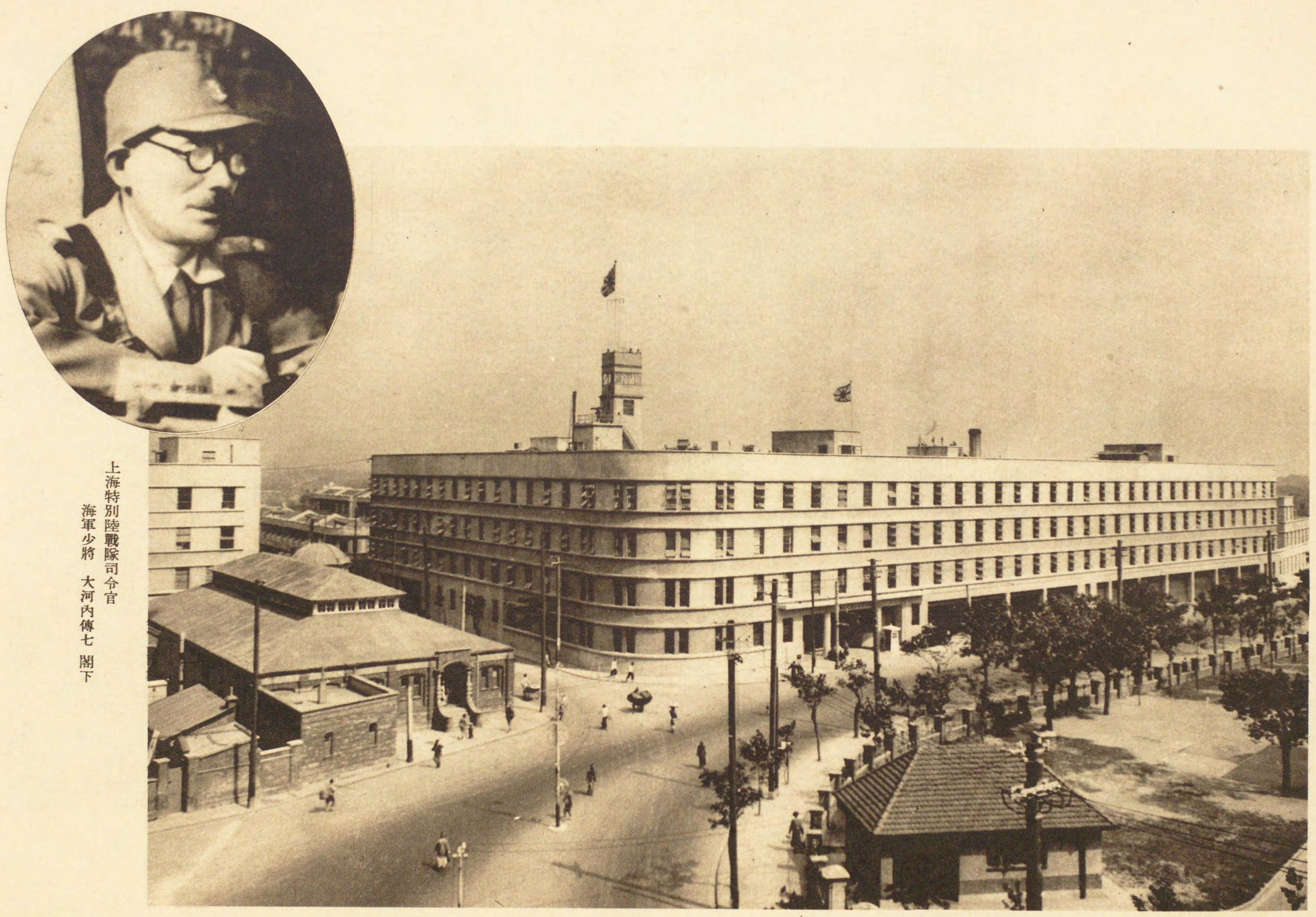
Headquarters of the Shanghai Special Naval Landing Force

On January 23, Min-kuo Jih-pao responded that the news was published based on reports from all sides and, upon declaration that it did not align with facts, would immediately be corrected. However, they stated they could not apologise in person. That day, a "correction notice" was published: The event of the San You factory at Xiang Port being set on fire by Japanese ronin on January 20 was reported with the involvement of the Marine Corps, based on reports from all sides. Following a statement from the headquarters of the Japanese Navy Marine Corps, the aforementioned report was found to be inconsistent with the facts, and is hereby corrected with an expression of regret. On January 24, the Japanese Navy Marine Corps issued a final ultimatum, stating that if their demands were not met, necessary measures would be taken.

=== Intervention of International Settlement ===
Facing pressure from the Nationalist Government, the Min-kuo Jih-pao ultimately decided to accede to the Japanese demands, sending the newspaper's responsible person to make both verbal and written apologies to the Japanese Navy Marine Corps on January 25. However, the Japanese side claimed to reject the apologies and demanded the closure of the Min-kuo Jih-pao, threatening the Shanghai Municipal Council (SMC) that if the council did not take action against the newspaper, the Marine Corps would shut down the SMC itself. Following negotiations by a Japanese director of the SMC, and the council's chairman, Stirling Fessenden, a board meeting was convened on the morning of January 25 with only foreign directors present and no Chinese directors. The meeting unanimously decided to close the Min-kuo Jih-pao on the grounds that it was disrupting the peace of the concession. After the meeting, Chinese directors protested to Fessenden, who pointed out that British and American forces in Shanghai was insufficient to stop Japan and that to prevent further deterioration of the situation, such measures had to be taken.

On January 26 at 2 PM, the Shanghai Municipal Council announced that "due to the tense situation in the city, the Shanghai Municipal Council advises your newspaper to cease publication," and immediately, armed police sealed the newspaper office. At 3 PM, several Western and Indian police locked the front and back doors of the newspaper office. On January 27, in accordance with Japan's demands, the Chinese government suspended the publication of the Min-kuo Jih-pao and the Foreign Minister Chen Youren, along with Sun Ke, resigned.

== Aftermath ==
On January 27, Japan sent 12 destroyers with 468 marines and 6 fighter planes from Sasebo to Shanghai. On January 28, the Japanese Ministry of the Navy ordered two aircraft carriers, three cruisers, and four mine warfare ships to Shanghai. Late that night, Japanese forces entered Zhabei and launched an attack on Chinese troops. On January 29, the Japanese government issued a statement claiming that the incident had been triggered by China's anti-Japanese movements, citing the disrespectful content published by the Minguo Daily toward the Japanese imperial family as one of the reasons for initiating hostilities. The battle of Shanghai ended on March 19. On May 4, the newspaper was re-launched as Min Bao, with Ye Chulian as its patron and financial support from the Central Publicity Department of KMT. It ceased publication on November 25, 1937, due to the Japanese occupation of Shanghai.
