= Land and the Ruling Class in Hong Kong =

Hong Kong studies book

- First edition
- Author: Alice Poon (潘慧嫻)
- Language: English
- Subject: Housing in Hong Kong; "big 6" families of Hong Kong; Politics of Hong Kong
- Genre: non-fiction
- Published: December 2005 (A. Poon) (English); July 2010 (Enrich Publishing) (Traditional Chinese); 2011 (Enrich Professional Publishing) (English); 2011 (Renmin University of China Press) (Simplified Chinese)
- Publication place: Canada
- ISBN: 978-0-97387600-0 (first edition, hardcover)

Land and the Ruling Class in Hong Kong
- Traditional Chinese: 地產霸權
- Simplified Chinese: 地产霸权
- Jyutping: dei6 caan2 baa3 kyun4
- Cantonese Yale: deih cháan ba kyùhn
- Hanyu Pinyin: Dì chǎn bà quán
- Literal meaning: real estate/property hegemony
Transcriptions
Standard Mandarin
- Hanyu Pinyin: Dì chǎn bà quán
Yue: Cantonese
- Yale Romanization: deih cháan ba kyùhn
- Jyutping: dei6 caan2 baa3 kyun4

Land and the Ruling Class in Hong Kong (Chinese: 地產霸權; lit. 'real estate hegemony' or "property hegemony") is a book written by Alice Poon Wai-han (traditional Chinese: 潘慧嫻; simplified Chinese: 潘慧娴; Jyutping: pun1 wai6 haan4; pinyin: Pān Huìxián), a former personal assistant of Kwok Tak-seng, the late co-founder of Hong Kong–based conglomerate Sun Hung Kai Properties. She also worked for another Hong Kong–based conglomerate, Kerry Properties. The book was about some real estate tycoon families of the former British colony, especially Li Ka-shing family, Kwok Tak-seng family, Lee Shau-kee family, Cheng Yu-tung family, Pao Yue-kong family and Kadoorie family, who controlled "property-cum-utility/public services conglomerates" of Hong Kong.

The book was written in Richmond, British Columbia. Poon resided in Steveston, a neighbourhood in the city.

According to a book review, as of December 2010, in less than 6 months of publishing, the Traditional Chinese edition had been re-printed seven times to the 8th print. The first Traditional Chinese edition also contained revised and updated materials that did not appear in the first English edition.

After the publication of the Traditional Chinese translation, it popularised the Chinese book title 地產霸權 as a term to describe the real estate tycoons of Hong Kong, according to Hong Sir in his column in Apple Daily.

The original English edition was reviewed by Canada Book Review Annual (CBRA) as a Canadian book. CBRA "was founded to provide Canadians with an evaluative guide to all the English-language and Canadian-authored scholarly, reference, trade, children's, and youth books published in Canada each year."

The Traditional Chinese translation was also reviewed by Guangzhou-based Southern Metropolis Daily in 2011, with title Dào dǐ shì shéi zài kòng zhì xiāng gǎng ? (lit. 'Who Controls Hong Kong?'). Since Nanfang Media Group, the publisher of Southern Metropolis Daily, is a state-owned media, the review was also interpreted by a Shenzhen-based academician, as an opinion from the central Chinese government regarding the tycoons themselves. According to the book review, the Simplified Chinese edition had some chapters censored.

== Editions ==
- Poon, Alice (December 2005). Land and the Ruling Class in Hong Kong (hardcover) (1st ed.). Richmond (BC). ISBN 978-0-97387600-0.
- 潘慧嫻 [Poon, Alice] (July 2010). 馬山 (ed.). dei6 caan2 baa3 kyun4 地產霸權 [Land and the Ruling Class in Hong Kong] (in Traditional Chinese). Translated by 顏詩敏 (1st ed.). Hong Kong: 天窗出版社 [Enrich Publishing] (Enrich Culture Group); Hong Kong Economic Journal. ISBN 978-988-19218-7-1.
- Poon, Alice (2011). Land and the Ruling Class in Hong Kong (hardback) (2nd ed.). Singapore, Hong Kong: Enrich Professional Publishing (Enrich Culture Group). ISBN 978-981-4339-10-0.
- 潘慧娴 [Poon, Alice] (2011). Dì chǎn bà quán 地产霸权 [Land and the Ruling Class in Hong Kong] (in Simplified Chinese) (1st ed.). Beijing: Renmin University of China Press. ISBN 978-7-30013122-1.

== See also ==
- Four big families of Hong Kong § Other definitions, a concept coined to some notable families of Hong Kong, but the members change from time to time
