= Dianshizhai Pictorial =

Chinese magazine, 1884–1898

Dianshizhai Pictorial (Chinese: 點石齋畫報, 1884–1898) was a Chinese language magazine published in Shanghai in the late 19th century. The profusely illustrated supplement of the Shen Bao newspaper became "wildly popular" among readers. Contributors included graphic artist Wu Youru.

== Images ==
Published in Dianshizhai Pictorial

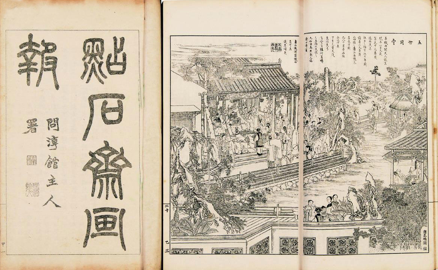
Cover and fold-out

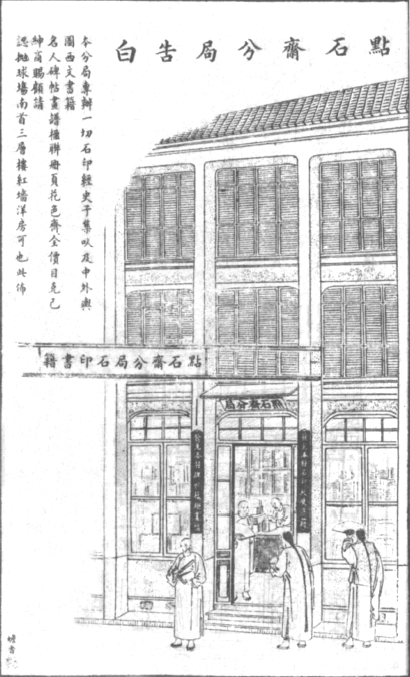
Advertisement, 1889

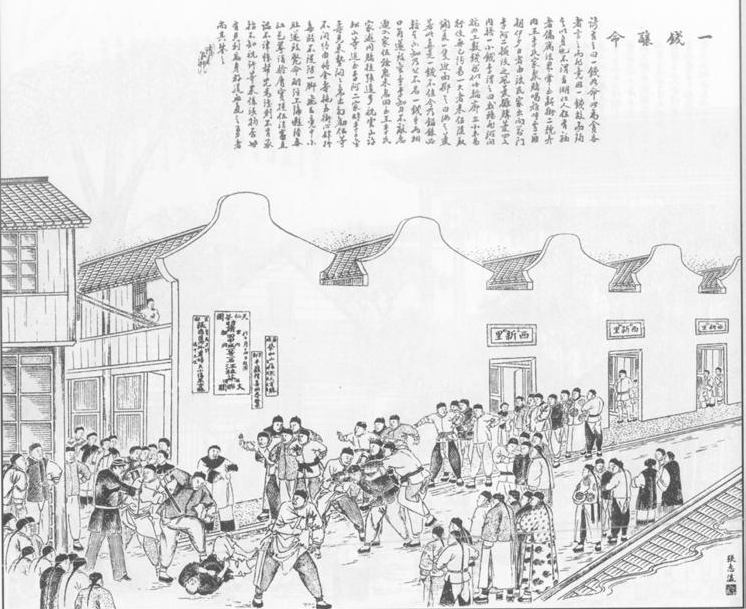
1890
