= Shi Liangcai =

Chinese murdered journalist (1880–1934)

Shi Liangcai (Chinese: 史量才; pinyin: Shǐ Liàngcái; Wade–Giles: Shih Liang-ts'ai) (January 2, 1880 – November 13, 1934) was a Chinese journalist best known for his ownership of Shen Bao and for his murder at the hands of Chiang Kai-shek's henchmen.

Shi was born in Qingpu, now part of Shanghai. He studied at the Sericultural School in Hangzhou and in 1904 founded a sericultural school for women in Shanghai; (in 1912 the school moved to Hushuguan, a few miles northwest of Suzhou). He lived in a graceful villa at what is now No. 257, Tongren Road, Shanghai from 1904 until his death.

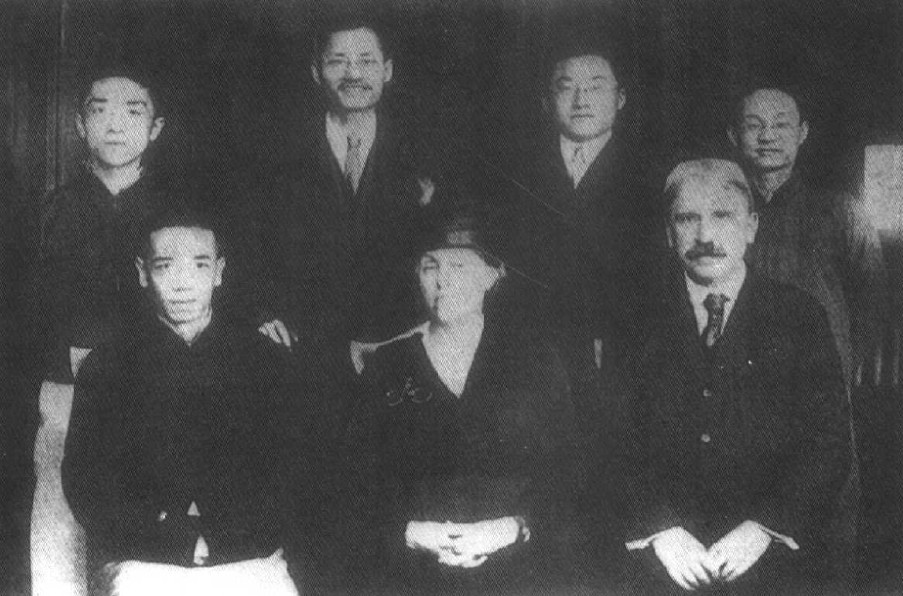
Shi Liangcai (lower left) with John Dewey (lower right) and Dewey's wife Alice, along with (back row left to right) Hu Shih, Jiang Menglin, Tao Xingzhi and Zhang Zuoping in Shanghai in 1919.

Along with journalists from the Shanghai newspaper Shibao (Eastern Times), by 1909 "the most widely circulated newspaper in the Shanghai region," Shi was a regular visitor to "an association known as the Xilou (Resting Place), which Shibao sponsored and where several items of the late-Qing reformist agenda were argued and shaped." When he took over Shen Bao in 1912, he furthered its liberal orientation; he also began a career as a press magnate, and from 1927, he bought up most of the stock of Shishi and Xinwen newspapers. He also expanded his range of business interests, with investments in cotton textiles.

He was the leader of the Jiangning tongxianghui (native place association) until his death; such associations in this period frequently "provided shelter and resources for anti-Japanese activists," and this one did not officially call a meeting between 1928 and 1933 because of a desire to avoid having to comply with oppressive Kuomintang regulations. "In the 1930s, Shi was a strong supporter of the Human Rights Defence Alliance established by Madam Soong Qing Ling, the second wife of revolutionary leader Dr Sun Yat-sen, with Cai Yuanpei and Lu Xun." He "had remained aloof from the initial phase of the Anti-Japanese National Salvation Association promoted in July 1931 by the Shanghai KMT and its auxiliary Chamber of Commerce," but after the Mukden Incident in September he became more involved, and in January 1932 "offered his nonpartisan leadership over a reconstituted anti-Japanese association and use of his Shenpao newspaper."

A courageous man, he responded to his political enemies with the saying, "You have a gun. I have a pen." His opposition to power had fatal consequences:

Shi Liangcai incurred Chiang's wrath for his newspaper's vociferous condemnation of the government's assassination of Yang Xingfo, for his vigorous public support for strong resistance against Japanese aggression, and for his spirited opposition to the crackdown on students and universities orchestrated by Minister of Education Zhu Jiahua. The conjunction of all three causes, and especially Shen Bao's dramatic analytical linkage of internal persecution of liberal human rights proponents to external appeasement of the Japanese, constituted a direct provocation to Chiang Kai-shek. Sometime in the fall or early winter of 1933, consequently, Chiang commanded Dai Li to prepare to assassinate Shi, who was then serving in one of the most prominent public positions in Shanghai as head of the Chinese Municipal Council.

Dai Li originally planned to carry out the operation against Shi in Shanghai, but the courageous editor lived in the International Settlement where police protection was difficult to circumvent... On November 13, 1934, Shi Liangcai and his family wound up their holidays and prepared to return to their Shanghai residence by automobile. Shi's party — his wife Shen Qiushui, his son Shi Yonggeng, his niece Shen Lijuan, and the son's schoolmate Deng Zuxun — took the Hu-Hang highway. When the car drew near Boai zhen, not far from the harbor of Wenjia in Haining county, they came across another automobile drawn across the highway. As Shi's chauffeur slowed down, the doors of the other car opened and the assassins jumped out with drawn guns. In the first hail of bullets the chauffeur and school-chum were shot down dead. The others tried to flee across a nearby field. Mrs. Shi was hit and fell wounded, as did her niece Shen Lijuan. Shi Yonggeng, the son, managed to run to safety. But Shi Liangcai was killed on the spot, and his body was dropped into a dry cistern.

The killing caused a tremendous public outcry — the entire Municipal Council resigned in protest — and the provincial governor of Zhejiang, Lu Diping, was eventually forced to resign.

== Literature ==
- Pang Rongdi (庞荣棣), Shi Liangcai: Xiandai baoye juzi (史量才 : 现代报业巨子) [Shi Liangcai: great man of the modern Chinese press], Shanghai: Shanghai jiaoyu chubanshe, 1999.
