= Lu Diping =

Chinese general (1887–1935)

- 鲁涤平
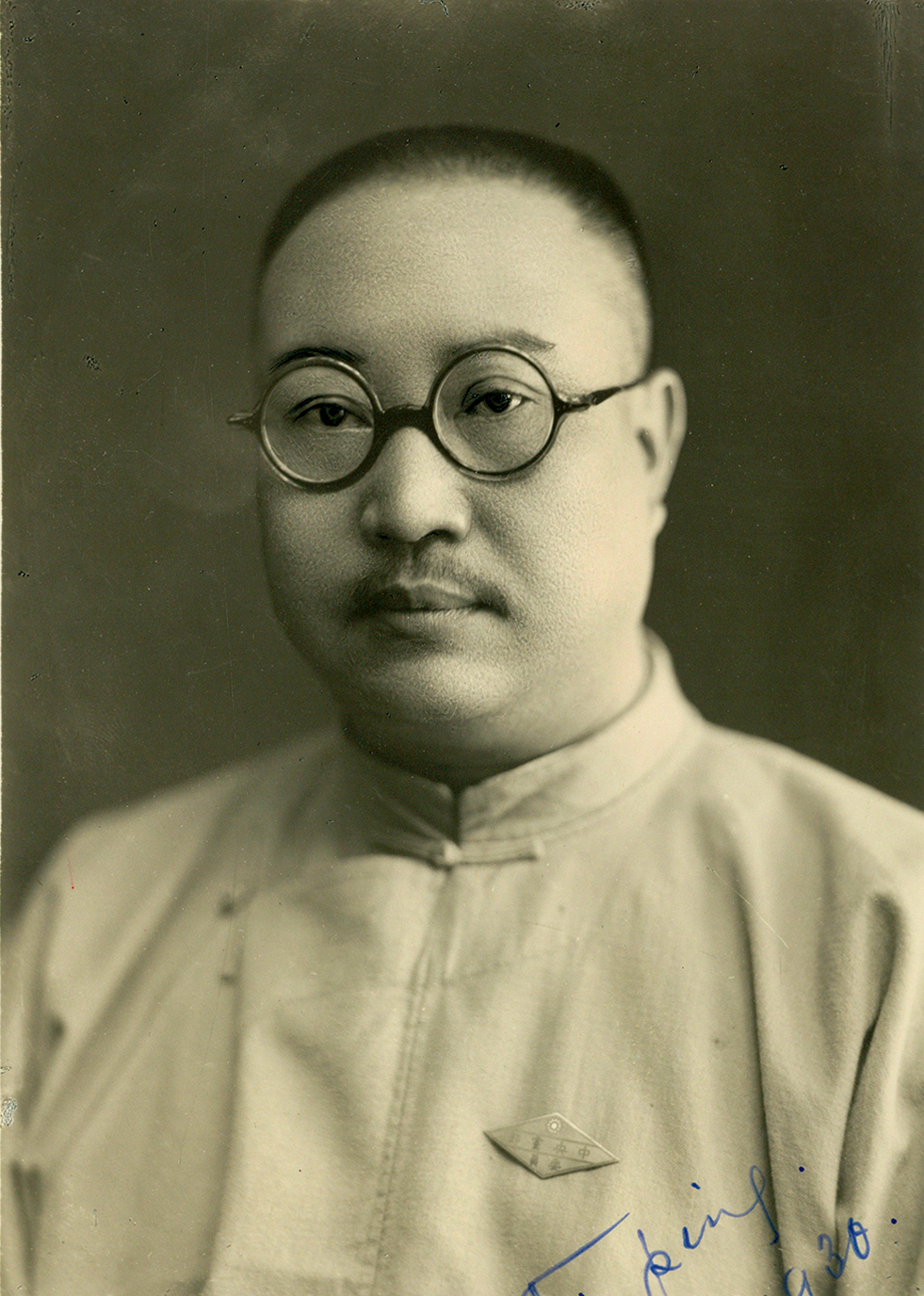
- Lu Diping
- Born: 1887; Ningxiang
- Died: 1935 (aged 47–48); Nanjing
- Occupation: Army commander
- Years active: 1901-1935

Lu Diping
- Traditional Chinese: 魯滌平
- Simplified Chinese: 鲁涤平
Transcriptions
Standard Mandarin
- Hanyu Pinyin: Lǔ Dípíng

Lu Diping (1887–1935) was a Chinese military general and politician. Born in Ningxiang, Hunan province, he was a graduate of Hunan Military College and a participant in the Wuchang Uprising. He commanded the 2nd Army and the 18th Division. He was allied with Wang Jingwei and the left wing faction of the KMT. He was chairman of the governments of Hunan from 1928–29, Jiangxi from 1929-31 and Zhejiang from 1931–34, resigning from the latter post as a consequence of the murder of Shi Liangcai. Lu died on January 24, 1935, in Nanjing, China.
