= Shen Bao =

Newspaper in Shanghai, China

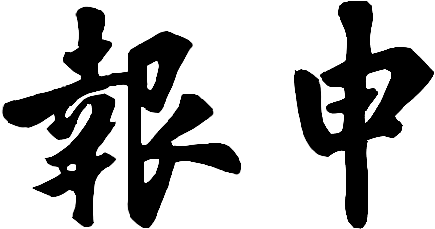

- Front page of the 1st issue, 1872
- Type: Daily
- Owner: Shenbaoguan
- Founder: Ernest Major
- Founded: 30 April 1872; 154 years ago
- Ceased publication: 27 May 1949; 77 years ago
- Political alignment: Conservative to reformist
- Language: Chinese
- Headquarters: Shanghai, China
- Circulation: 70,000 (as of 1946)
- Sister newspapers: Yinghuan suoji (1872); Minbao (1876); Dianshizhai Pictorial (1882)

Shen Bao (Chinese: 申報; lit. 'The Report', romanized contemporarily as The Shun Pao) was a Chinese daily newspaper published by the Shenbaoguan (申報館; 'Shen Bao Office') in Shanghai from 1872 to 1949. It was one of the most influential Chinese newspapers for much of its publication, achieving particular dominance during the late 1800s and the 1920s, interrupted by bouts of financial and political difficulties. It alternated between periods of reformist and conservative political leanings.

Founded by the English merchant Ernest Major in Shanghai, Shen Bao quickly became the most popular newspaper Chinese-language newspaper in the city. It was able to operate free of censorship from the Imperial government due to its location within the Shanghai International Settlement, but circulated throughout China. It was more focused on domestic matters than other foreign-sponsored papers in China, and advocated for moderate westernization as part of the Self-Strengthening Movement. It faced little competition until the 1890s, when the Xinwen Bao and smaller reformist papers emerged. The more conservative Shen Bao faced financial difficulties, prompting its sale to a Chinese businessman in 1909.

Following the 1911 Revolution, a group of businessmen acquired the paper and hired Shi Liangcai as its manager. Shi acquired the paper after a 1915 legal dispute. He sought to maximize advertising revenue, expanded the paper's distribution network, and avoided a crackdown on dissident papers under Yuan Shikai's rule. The paper launched various supplements and by 1929 had become the most successful newspaper in China. Shi consolidated much of the Shanghai press industry under his ownership, but faced political pressure from the Kuomintang government, which had him assassinated in 1934. After the Battle of Shanghai in 1937, the paper was transferred to American ownership to avoid repression, but was seized by Imperial Japanese forces in 1941 and pushed to a pro-Japanese stance. The Kuomintang seized the Shen Bao after Japan's defeat in 1945, with the locally-dominant CC Clique controlling its content. After Chinese Communist Party took Shanghai in 1949, they discontinued the paper, printing the Jiefang ribao from its old offices.

== Background ==
Western-style newspapers were introduced to China by European Christian missionaries in the early 19th century. The first newspaper in Chinese was the Chinese Monthly Magazine (察世俗每月統記傳; Chá shìsú měiyuè tǒngjì chuán), published from 1815 to 1821 in Malacca by the British missionaries William Milne and Robert Morrison. Foreign-language newspapers began publication in coastal China during the 1820s, and became prevalent across the treaty ports. In Shanghai, the North China Herald (founded in 1850 and later renamed to the North China Daily News) was the most prominent of these. The first Chinese-language newspaper in Shanghai was the Shanghai Xinbao (上海新报; 'Shanghai New Daily'), founded as a weekly in 1861 by American missionary Young John Allen. Most of its news consisted of items translated from the North China Herald, of which it was a subsidy.

=== Establishment ===
Two English merchants, Ernest Major and his brother Frederick, arrived in China in 1859 to establish a tea trading company following a failed venture in Italy. In 1862, they established the Kiangsu Chemical Works in Shanghai, one of the city's first modern factories. Ernest Major moved from Ningbo to Shanghai in 1871. Major was known for his fluency in Chinese, and took efforts to distance himself from British political and religious interests operating in China. He made plans to begin a newspaper after one of his business agents, (Note: This agent's name is variously given as Chen Huageng, Chen Shengang, or Chen Gengshen.) inspired by the Xinbao, suggested he start one.

In May 1871, Major and three other British businessmen each contributed 400 taels to establish a Chinese-language newspaper in the International Settlement, dubbed the Shen Bao (申報; 'The Report'). Major took the responsibility of managing the paper, and the four agreed that he would receive two thirds of its profits, with the rest distributed equally between the other investors. He recruited staff for the paper over the course of the year, and sought the assistance of Wang Tao, a translator and newspaper editor living in political exile in British Hong Kong.

== Publishing history ==
=== Qing period ===
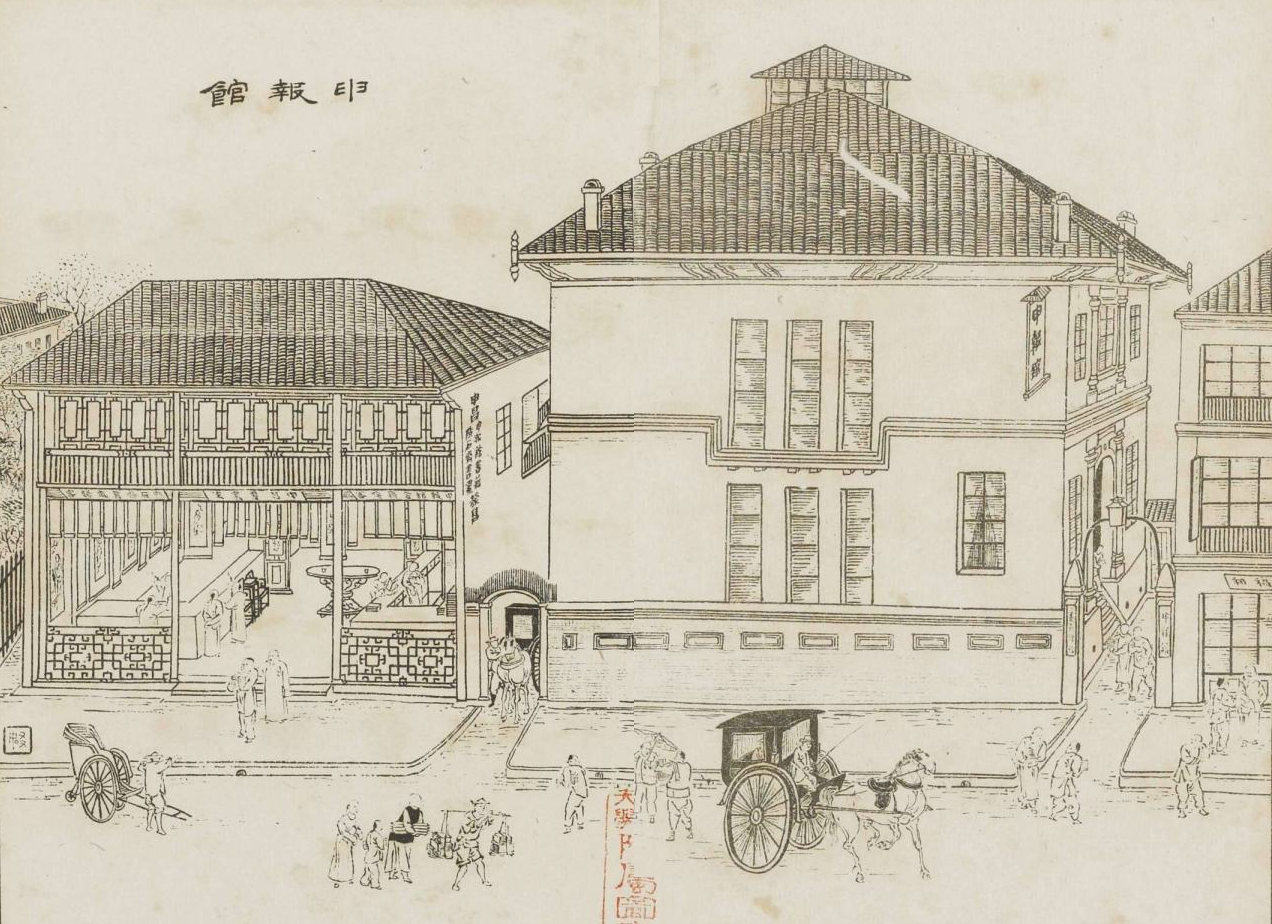
The Shenchang Bookshop (left) and Shen Bao offices (right) in 1884, as depicted by Wu Youru

Shen Bao's first issue was published on 30 April 1872. Jiang Zhixiang, a scholar from Zhejiang, served as the first editor-in-chief, with He Guisheng and Qian Xinbo (Wang's son-in-law) as assistant editors. It saw an initial circulation of around 600 copies. Early issues were printed with a hand-operated cylinder printing press produced by the British firm Harrild & Sons, capable of producing around 100 pages per hour, and written in electrotype typefaces designed by William Gamble and purchased from the American Presbyterian Mission Press.

Later in 1872, Major established the Shenbaoguan (申報館; 'Shen Bao Office') publishing firm, which began publishing the monthly magazine Yinghuan suoji (瀛寰瑣紀; 'Around the World') that November, the first Chinese literary magazine. The firm launched an unsuccessful periodical in 1876, entitled Minbao (民報; 'People's News'), a triweekly magazine written in vernacular Chinese. In addition to these periodicals, Shenbaoguan published various books.

Shen Bao quickly became the most prominent and successful Chinese-language newspaper in Shanghai. At a price of eight cash per issue, it was much more affordable than its main competitor, the thirty-cash Xinbao; this was enabled by measures such as printing on cheaper paper and reduced advertisement prices for local companies. Additionally, Shen Bao's domestic focus appealed to the public more than the Xinbao's preoccupation with foreign issues. Xinbao was forced out of circulation by the end of 1872, leaving Shen Bao as the only remaining Chinese-language newspaper in Shanghai. The circuit intendant of Shanghai, the local governor, partnered with officials in Xiangshan County, Guangdong, to create a new newspaper in an attempt to counter the growing influence of the Shen Bao. Dubbed the Huibao (汇报; 'The Report'), it lasted only a few months before ceasing publication.

The Shen Bao was published in the Shanghai International Settlement, a foreign concession administered by the Municipal Council, a body elected by local landowners. As Shanghai was not under the jurisdiction of the imperial government or any other country, the Shen Bao was able to publish without censorship. Historian Barbara Mittler described it as "one of the world's most independent papers at that time". Over the following years, the paper began to be sold in regions of Zhejiang and Jiangsu neighboring Shanghai; outlets were established in Hangzhou and Ningbo in 1880, followed by one in Wenzhou in 1882. By the early 1880s, it was sold in Beijing and Tianjin and several provincial capitals.

In 1884, Shen Bao boasted of selling 10,000 copies per day. That year, chief editor Jiang Zhixiang passed the imperial examinations and left the company, succeeded in the position by Qian Xinbo. To provide visual coverage of the 1884–1885 Sino-French War, Shen Bao began to include an illustrated supplement named the Dianshizhai Pictorial (printed by the Dianshizhai Publishing Works) alongside the paper. Published every ten days, it was included every as a free supplement for Shen Bao subscribers, and was later available for separate purchase. Unlike four prior short-lived lithographic supplements, the Dianshizhai Pictorial gained significant popularity and longevity. It ran for 14 years, including around 4,500 pictures during this period.

The Major Brothers founded and acquired multiple other companies in Shanghai from the 1860s to 1880s. Among these were the Dianshizhai publishing works, founded in 1877, (Note: Ye gives the date 1874 for the founding of the Dianshizhai works.) and noted for introducing lithographic printing on a mass scale to China. In 1889, the various companies owned by the Major Brothers were amalgamated into a single British-owned corporation, Major Brothers Ltd. That same year, Ernest Major retired and returned to England; his total investments in China was estimated to be worth around 30,000 yuan.

==== Competition and financial troubles ====
For much of the late 1800s, Shen Bao had no serious commercial opposition. A major competitor, the Xinwen Bao (新聞報; 'News Report'), was founded by a joint Chinese-English business venture in 1893. While the Shen Bao was now sold for ten cash per issue, Xinwen Bao's subsidization from ad revenue allowed it to be sold for seven cash. By 1900, Xinwen Bao sold several thousand copies more than the Shen Bao, reaching a daily circulation of about 12,000. Shen Bao was associated with political news, while Xinwen Bao became known for its coverage of commercial affairs.

The defeat of the Qing dynasty in the First Sino-Japanese War and the 1895 Treaty of Shimonoseki sparked outrage, prompting intellectuals and journalists to write in favor of increased reform and modernization. The number of newspapers in circulation in China rose from about a dozen to over a hundred by the end of the decade. Shen Bao began to face additional competition from more radical papers such as the Zhongwai ribao (中外日報; 'Chinese and Foreign Daily'), Shibao (時報; 'Times'), and the revolutionary Liang Qichao's Xinmin congbao (新民丛报; 'New Citizen Miscellany'). Shen Bao adopted a more conservative stance after the failure of the Hundred Days' Reform in 1898, resulting in reduced circulation and financial difficulties.

By 1904, the Shibao was the most popular paper in Shanghai, with Shen Bao facing bankruptcy. The editorial staff of the Shen Bao was overhauled in 1905, with Jin Jianhua appointed as chief editor, and the paper took a more reformist line. Although it avoided bankruptcy, it continued to be a financial burden to Major Brothers Ltd. In 1907, Major Brothers agreed to sell the paper to Xi Zipei, the paper's comprador (foreign business agent) from nearby Qingpu. Two years later, Xi was able to raise the funds to finalize the deal and purchase the paper. Although it was now Chinese-owned, the paper's management and editorship did not significantly change.

=== Republican period ===
The Shanghai news industry entered a period of turmoil following the 1911 Revolution, which saw the fall of the Qing dynasty in favor of the Republic. Some previously revolutionary newspapers were now closely aligned with government interests, while various new political papers attempted to represent the rival Kuomintang and Republican Party.

In 1912, a group of four Chinese businessmen acquired the Shen Bao from Xi. Ownership was split between Chen Jinghan, Ying Jizhong, Zhang Jian, and Zhao Fengchang. They first approached journalist and editor Zhang Shizhao to serve as its general manager, who rejected the offer. After this, they recruited Shi Liangcai, a journalist and teacher with political connections to Zhang. Shi reformed the structure of the paper, establishing separate departments for editorial, financial, and general matters. He appointed Chen as the paper's editor-in-chief, and recruited Shibao staff member Zhang Zhuping as the financial and advertising manager. Zhang prioritized advertisement as a means to ensure the paper's profitability, and established sub-departments for advertisement marketing and design.

Shen Bao upgraded their printing machinery several times in the 1910s. In 1911, they purchased a double-cylinder press able to print 2,000 pages per hour, slow compared to foreign presses, but more than any other firm in Shanghai. A Japanese Marinoni-style press purchased in 1916 was able to produce 8,000 pages per hour, about half of the Western standard. Two years later, they acquired a significantly faster American rotary press, able to print 10,000 copies of a 12-page section per hour.

Xi Zipei nominally served as a manager for the paper following its sale, but had conflicts with Shi. Xi sued the new ownership in 1915, claiming that he had not been paid on time, and that the Shen Bao trademark was being misused. The Shanghai Mixed Court ruled in his favor, charging the owners 245,000 tael. The previous owners withdrew from the paper, and using money borrowed from cotton merchant Xu Jingren, Shi acquired full ownership.

==== Shi Liangcai's ownership ====
President Yuan Shikai cracked down on newspapers critical of his regime. Only five daily newspapers remained in Shanghai by 1915, including Shen Bao. All were politically moderate and generally supportive of his rule. The First World War cut off Shanghai from European sources of newsprint, but Shi was able to supplement this with local and Japanese production. With its main competitor, the Xinwen Bao, the Shen Bao participated in a "distribution war". The Shen Bao opened branch offices in various major cities across China to supplement the post system. In Shanghai, distribution was controlled by a cartel called the Newspaper Distribution Union, backed by organized crime. Shen Bao manager Zhang Zhuping established a delivery agency for the paper, which attempted to outperform the union through a bicycle fleet.

By 1929, the Shen Bao had become the most successful newspaper in China, employing over 450 staff. The opposition paper Shishi Xinbao had survived Yuan's crackdown, but became unprofitable under new ownership in the mid-1920s. The Shishi Xinbao and Shen Bao formed the Shenshi news agency together in 1925, and two years later Shen Bao manager Zhang Zhuping acquired the Shishi Xinbao. Although he continued to work for the Shen Bao, Shi became frustrated at Zhang's focus on his new paper, leading Zhang to resign from the Shen Bao in 1929. Later that year, Shi attempted to acquire Shen Bao's largest competitor, the Xinwen Bao, from the American scholar John Ferguson. Ferguson was eager to sell the paper, but the Xinwen Bao staff were outraged by the move, opposing a press monopoly under Shi. They began a protest movement against the acquisition, partnering with merchant associations, the local branch of the Kuomintang, and the staff associations of other major newspapers. Shi negotiated a 50% share in the Xinwen Bao, gaining financial control over the paper, but not editorial oversight.

Although Shi had consolidated control over much of the Shanghai press industry, Zhang Zhuping built a competing press conglomerate and acquired full control over the Shenshi news agency. However, his political dissidence led to a crackdown by the Kuomintang government in 1934, leading him to eventually sell the paper. Shi criticized the Kuomintang government for its foreign policy towards the Empire of Japan, but was less financially vulnerable to political pressure than Zhang. This prompted the Kuomintang to assassinate him in November 1934, after which the paper fell into the control of a conservative board of directors.

=== Japanese occupation ===
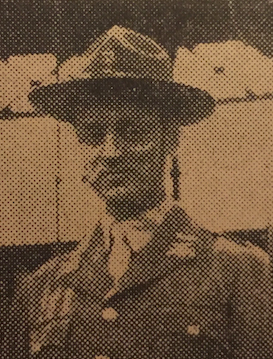
The American lawyer Norwood Allman managed the Shen Bao from 1937 to 1941, during the first half of the Second Sino-Japanese War.

Following the outbreak of the Second Sino-Japanese War and the Battle of Shanghai in 1937, manager Shi Yonggeng fled Shanghai for Hong Kong. He left control of Shen Bao to Norwood Allman, an American lawyer who had long been friends with Shi Liangcai, serving as an editorial and legal advisor. Allman formed an American corporation to publish the paper. However, his pro-American and anti-Japanese political stance frustrated the Japanese occupation authorities. Over the year following the Japanese occupation, the Shen Bao was published from Hankou (now Wuhan), and later from Hong Kong. By October 1938, it returned to Shanghai under Allman's ownership. In December 1941, the occupation government confiscated control over both the Shen Bao and Xinwen bao.

Chen Binhe was appointed as editor-in-chief of the Shen Bao in December 1942. Despite earlier anti-Japanese activism, he collaborated with the Japanese authorities during the war, gathering intelligence for them in Hong Kong and Shanghai. As a leftist intellectual, his decision to collaborate may have stemmed from resentment towards Chiang Kai-shek and his government. Chen was paid in Japanese military scrip, with the editorship of the paper supervised under the Public Information Office of the Japanese Armed Forces.

The previously obscure Zhonghua ribao (中華日報; 'Chinese Daily News') exceeded the circulation of the Shen Bao and Xinwen bao during the war, becoming the city's most popular newspaper. Founded by Wang Jingwei in 1932, the Zhonghua ribao gained traction after Wang became the head of the collaborator government. Shen Bao's other competitor papers during the occupation included the politician Zhou Fohai's Ping Bao (平報; 'Peace News') and two papers established directly by the Japanese military, Xin Shenbao (新申報; 'New Declaration') and Xin Zhongguo Bao (新中国報; 'New China News').

=== Later history ===
Japan surrendered in August 1945, ending the Second Sino-Japanese War and World War II. As the Nationalist Government reasserted control over Shanghai, it took over newspapers, publications, and broadcasting in the city. As the extraterritorial concessions had been abolished during the war, the Kuomintang was able to suspend 17 newspapers in Shanghai which had collaborated with the Japanese. Chiang Kai-shek initially wished to discontinue the Shen Bao entirely, but after meditation by politician and mob boss Du Yuesheng, the paper was allowed to continue publication. Shi Yonggeng's owership was reduced to 40% and he lost control of the paper. The Kuomintang appointed party official Pan Gongzhan as the paper's editor-in-chief. Chen Xunyu (the former head of the Shanghai News Censorship Office) became the general manager, and Du was appointed as the chairman of the paper's board of directors.

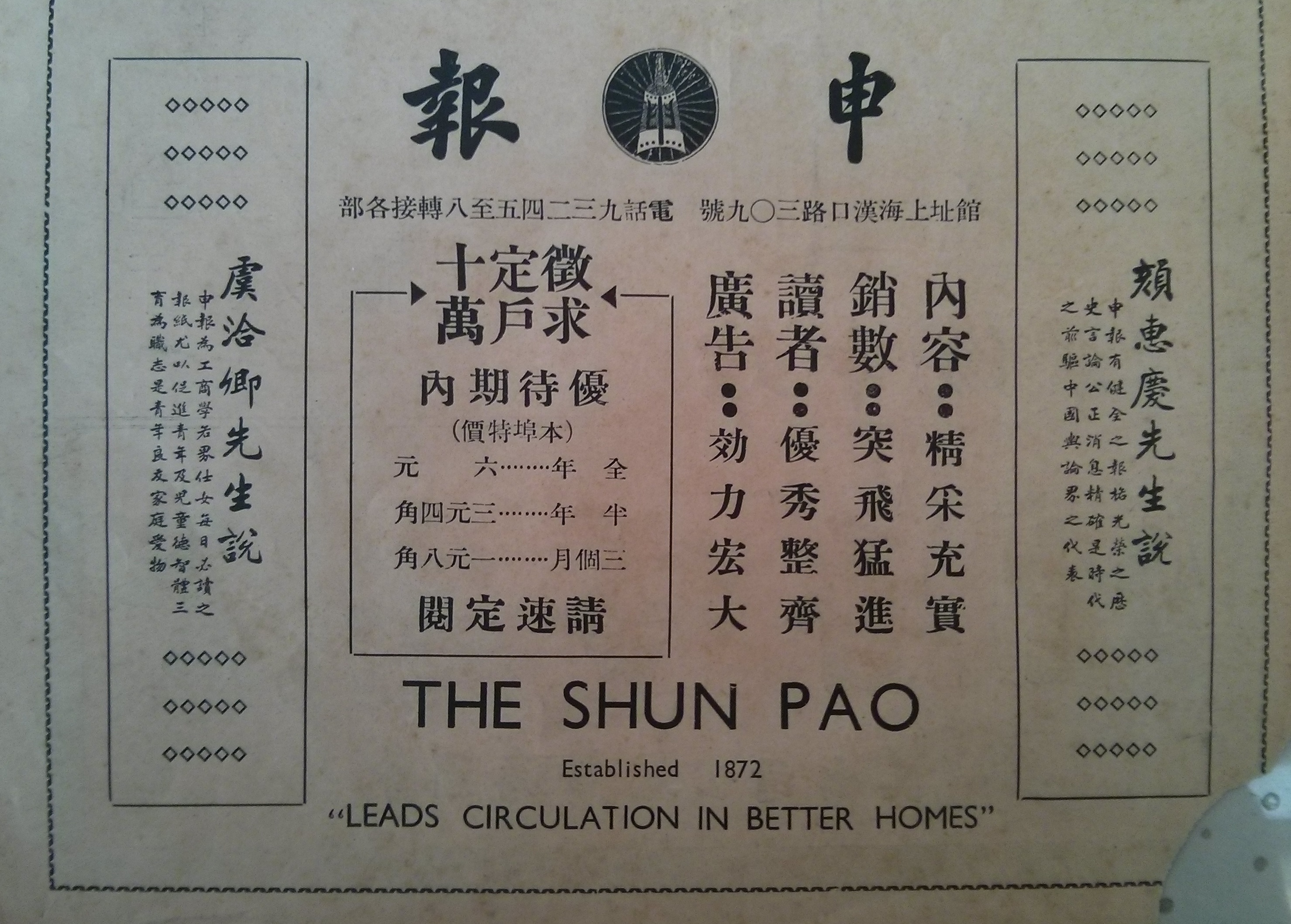
1948 subscription advertisement for Shen Bao

After the Kuomintang takeover, both the Shen Bao and the Xinwen Bao became closely associated with the CC Clique, a regionally-dominant political faction of the Kuomintang. In February 1946, it had a daily circulation of around 70,000, behind the Xinwen Bao but ahead of the Shanghai Kuomintang's own paper, the Zhengyan bao (正言報).

==== CCP takeover ====
As the Chinese Civil War turned in favor of the Chinese Communist Party (CCP) and its forces took over Shanghai in 1949, it placed the city under the control of the under the Shanghai Municipal Military Control Committee (上海軍事管制委員会). On 28 March 1949, CCP forces seized the Shen Bao offices and used its press to begin printing a local party newspaper, the Jiefang ribao (解放日报; 'Liberation Daily'), ending the 76-year run of the Shen Bao. In May 1949, the committee published its guidance on the news industry, stating it was "guaranteeing the people's freedom of speech and press, and depriving the counterrevolutionaries of the freedom of speech and press".

The CCP took control of the CC Clique's shares in the Shenbaoguan and transferred it to the Jiefang ribao. However, it still lacked a majority stake, as many shares were still held by Shi Yonggeng, alongside a smaller amount by other private owners. Unable to justify seizing private stock of the company outright, the CCP cooperated with Shanghai capitalists who held stakes. Later in 1949, the Jiefang ribao was able to acquire a majority stake in the company.

== Content ==
=== Early years ===
Shen Bao was initially published every other day, although from its fifth issue onward it was published as a daily. It was eight pages long. From its beginning, the Shen Bao was much more concerned with domestic matters than other foreign-sponsored newspapers in China. In its inaugural issue, Shen Bao declared that its purpose was to ensure that "readers are able to know what is happening around the world without stepping out of their homes". Founded during the Self-Strengthening Movement, the paper took an optimistic approach towards westernization. It advocated for the adoption of western technology and promoted private enterprise.

The Shen Bao reprinted the Jingbao, a gazette of announcements posted daily by the imperial court in Beijing, followed by a set of announcements from the Jiangsu provincial government. In 1873, Shen Bao published an article entitled "The Differences between Jingbao and Foreign Newspapers" (論中國京報異於外國新報; Lùn zhōngguó jīngbào yì yú wàiguó xīnbào), one of the earliest pieces on the history of journalism in China. The article argued that newspapers could supplant government gazettes, reporting "events big as state affairs and anecdotes trivial as village rumors". The newspaper frequently covered the imperial examination system, inviting scholars to publish their essays in the paper to serve as an example to exam candidates. By 1882, owing to telegraph infrastructure, it was able to publish the results of the provincial examinations in Beijing the following day.

The paper closely covered the Sino-French War of 1884–1885, sending a Russian war correspondent (presumed to be a neutral observer) south to report on fighting in Vietnam, covering the losses endured by the imperial army. The imperial government published various edicts during the war calling for the closure of the paper.

Shen Bao's primary focus was on commercial news and issues, advocating for industrialization and commercial modernization. Historian Joan Judge describes its political essays on other topics as lengthy, dull, and "trivial rather than topical". During the 1890s, Shen Bao further adopted a conservative political stance. The paper began to critique the exiled revolutionary Liang Qichao and support a stance similar to Zhang Zhidong, advocating for limited modernization under the control of the Qing state. It returned to a reformist position in 1905, openly supporting Liang.

=== Shi Liangcai era ===
In the 1910s, the percentage of the paper consisting of advertisements rose from 50 to 60% to 60–70%. Advertising manager Zhang Zhuping introduced two additional pages consisting exclusively of advertisements to the front of the paper. The font size of the paper was also reduced, and the page layout was optimized to provide more space for advertising. Shi Liangcai had relatively little interest in pushing a political line, instead seeking to maximize profitability for the paper. However, following his assassination in 1934, the paper returned to a conservative stance.

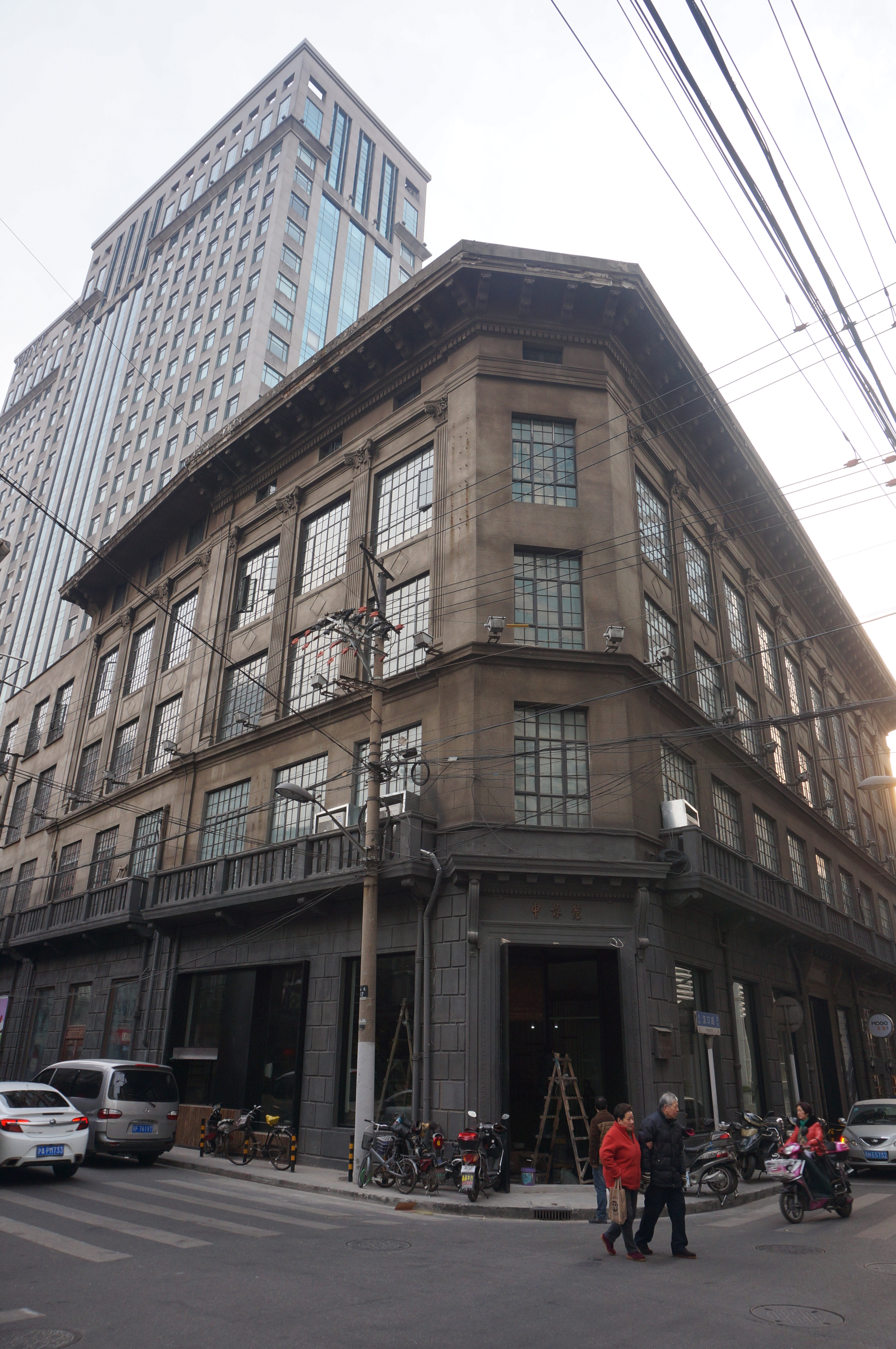
The former Shen Bao building in Shanghai, as seen in 2015

Beginning in 1919, the Shen Bao began to publish an 8-page weekly supplement on international affairs, the Shenbao Xingqi Zengkan (申報星期增刊; 'Weekly Supplementary Issue to The Report'), aimed mostly at intellectuals. A daily two-page general interest supplement, Changshi (常識; 'General Knowledge'), was founded in 1920, while a four-page advertisement and informational supplement on automobiles, Qiche zengkan (汽車增刊; 'Automobiles') was founded the following year. Other supplements published by the paper during the 1920s include the Jiaoyu yu rensheng (教育與人生; 'Education and Life') and the Benbu zengkan (本埠增刊; 'Local Supplement'), a daily Shanghai-specific supplement mainly consisting of advertisements. Ge Gongzhen, who had previously founded an illustrated supplement to the Shibao, founded an illustrated supplement for the Shen Bao in 1930, featuring photographs to accompany news reports.

=== Occupation and later history ===
After Japanese military authorities took control of the paper in 1941, they ordered the Shen Bao to emphasize Sino-Japanese cooperation, support the Japanese war effort and the Greater East Asia Co-Prosperity Sphere, and to legitimize the Wang Jingwei regime as the sole representative government of China. Historian Sei Jeong Chin described the paper during this period as a "mouthpiece and propaganda tool for mobilizing the Chinese masses". In February 1943, it ran an editorial emphasizing the need for total war, stating that the war's central objective was to "concentrate the national human, material, and financial resources in order to meet the new political needs and put the cooperation with the Japanese and obligation to defend Asia into practice." After the Kuomintang takeover of Shanghai in 1945, the CC Clique used the Xinwen Bao and Shen Bao to disseminate its views.

== Notes ==
=== Bibliography ===
==== Books ====
- Fang, Hangqi, ed. (2013). A History of Journalism in China. Vol. 1. Translated by Ng, Caren H. Y. Silkroad Press. ISBN 9789814332255.
- Fang, Hangqi, ed. (2014). A History of Journalism in China. Vol. 2. Translated by Lee, Vivien. Silkroad Press. ISBN 9789814332262.
- Fang, Hangqi, ed. (2013b). A History of Journalism in China. Vol. 3. Translated by Cheng, Janet. Silkroad Press. ISBN 9789814332279.
- Fang, Hangqi, ed. (2013c). A History of Journalism in China. Vol. 4. Translated by Ma, Ben. Silkroad Press. ISBN 9789814332286.
- Gentz, Natascha (2013). "From News, Xinwen 新聞, to New Knowledge, Xinxue 新學: Newspapers as Sources for Early Modern Chinese Encyclopaedias". Chinese Encyclopaedias of New Global Knowledge (1870-1930): Changing Ways of Thought. Transcultural Research – Heidelberg Studies on Asia and Europe in a Global Context. Springer Science & Business Media. pp. 55–85. doi:10.1007/978-3-642-35916-3. ISBN 9783642359163.
- Judge, Joan (1996). Print and Politics: Shibao and the Culture of Reform in Late Qing China. Stanford University Press. ISBN 9780804727419.
- Mittler, Barbara (2004). A Newspaper for China?: Power, Identity, and Change in Shanghai's News Media, 1872-1912. Vol. 226. Harvard University Asia Center. doi:10.2307/j.ctt1tg5kz3. ISBN 9780674012172. JSTOR j.ctt1tg5kz3.
- Rankin, Mary Backus (1986). Elite Activism and Political Transformation in China: Zhejiang Province, 1865–1911. Stanford University Press. ISBN 9780804713214.
- Reed, Christopher A. (2004). Gutenberg in Shanghai: Chinese Print Capitalism, 1876–1937. University of British Columbia Press. ISBN 9780774810418.
- Song, Jun (1996). 申报的兴衰 [The Rise and Fall of Shenbao] (in Chinese). Shanghai Academy of Social Sciences Press. ISBN 9787806181904.
- Tsai, Weipin (2009). Reading Shenbao: Nationalism, Consumerism and Individuality in China 1919–37. Palgrave Macmillan. ISBN 9780230246713.
- Wagner, Rudolf G., ed. (2007). Joining the Global Public: Word, Image, and City in Early Chinese Newspapers, 1870-1910. SUNY Press. ISBN 9780791479988. JSTOR jj.18254582.
  - Mittler, Barbara. "Domesticating an Alien Medium: Incorporating the Western-style Newspaper into the Chinese Public Sphere". 13-46.
  - Gentz, Natascha. "Useful Knowledge and Appropriate Communication: The Field of Journalistic Production in Late Nineteenth Century China". 47-104.
- Wagner, Rudolf G. (2019). Wagner, Rudolf G.; Yeh, Catherine V.; Menegon, Eugenio; Weller, Robert P. (eds.). Testing the Margins of Leisure: Case Studies on China, Japan, and Indonesia. Heidelberg University Publishing. doi:10.17885/heiup.550. ISBN 9783947732739.
- Ye, Xiaoqing (2003). The Dianshizhai Pictorial: Shanghai Urban Life, 1884-1898. University of Michigan Press. doi:10.3998/mpub.19843. ISBN 9781938937040.
- Zhang, Qing (2023). China's Intelligentsia in the Late 19th to Early 20th Centuries: The Emergence of New Forms of Publications and New Modes of Intellectual Engagement. De Gruyter. ISBN 9783110661101.

==== Articles ====
- Chen, Jianhua (2012). "Republican Constitutional Politics and Family-State Imagination: Zhou Shoujuan and the 'Free Talk' Column in Shenbao: 1921–1926". Contemporary Chinese Thought. 44 (1): 36–69. doi:10.2753/CSP1097-1467440102.
- Chin, Sei Jeong (2004). "The Historical Origins of the Nationalization of the Newspaper Industry in Modern China: A Case Study of the Shanghai Newspaper Industry, 1937—1953". China Review. 13 (2): 1–34. JSTOR 23611063.
- Chin, Sei Jeong (2014). "Print Capitalism, War, and the Remaking of the Mass Media in 1930s China". Modern China. 40 (4): 393–425. doi:10.1177/0097700413493837. JSTOR 24575604.
- MacKinnon, Stephen R. (1997). "Toward a History of the Chinese Press in the Republican Period". Modern China. 23 (1): 3–32. doi:10.1177/009770049702300101. JSTOR 189462.
- Tsai, Weipin (2014). "The First Casualty: Truth, Lies and Commercial Opportunism in Chinese Newspapers during the First Sino-Japanese War". Journal of the Royal Asiatic Society. 24 (1): 145–163. JSTOR 43307286.
- Vittinghoff, Natascha (2001). "Readers, Publishers and Officials in the Contest for a Public Voice and the Rise of a Modern Press in Late Qing China (1860-1880)". T'oung Pao. 87 (4/5): 393–455. doi:10.1163/156853201804665. JSTOR 4528882.
- Vittinghoff, Natscha (2004). ""British Barbarians" and "Chinese Pigtails"? Translingual Practice in a Transnational Environment in Nineteenth Century Hong Kong and Shanghai". China Review. 4 (1): 27–54. JSTOR 23461802.
- Wagner, Rudolf G. (1999). "The Shenbao in Crisis: The International Environment and the Conflict Between Guo Songtao and the Shenbao". Late Imperial China. 20 (1): 107–143. doi:10.1353/late.1999.0004.
- Wagner, Rudolf G. (2001). "The Early Chinese Newspapers and the Chinese Public Sphere". European Journal of East Asian Studies. 1 (1): 1–33. doi:10.1163/157006102775123012. JSTOR 23615530.
- Wagner, Rudolf G. (2018). "The Free Flow of Communication Between High and Low: The Shenbao as Platform for Yangwu Discussions on Political Reform, 1872-1895". T'oung Pao. 104 (1–2): 116–188. doi:10.1163/15685322-10413P04. JSTOR 26566286.
- Yeh, Catherine (2015). "Recasting the Chinese Novel: Ernest Major's Shenbao Publishing House (1872–1890)". The Journal of Transcultural Studies. 6 (1): 171–289. doi:10.11588/ts.2015.1.22205.

==== Theses ====
- Narramore, Terry (1989). Making the News in Shanghai: Shenbao and the Politics of Newspaper Journalism (1912–1937) (PhD thesis). Australian National University.
- Wang, Yi (2016). Journalism under Fire in China: The Shanghai Evening Post and Mercury, 1929-1949 (PhD thesis). University of Tasmania. doi:10.25959/23239853.
- Ye, Xiaoqing (1991). Popular Culture in Shanghai 1884–1898 (PhD thesis). Australian National University.
