= Enrich Professional Publishing =

- Parent company: Enrich Culture Group
- Status: Active
- Founded: 2009
- Country of origin: Hong Kong
- Headquarters location: Hong Kong
- Official website: www.enrichculture.com

Enrich Professional Publishing (S) Private Limited (EPP) is a publisher incorporated in Singapore, but related to Enrich Professional Publishing Limited and Hong Kong–based Enrich Publishing Limited (Chinese: 天窗出版社有限公司). Enrich Professional Publishing is headquartered in Hong Kong and had offices in Singapore and Beijing. Both Enrich Professional Publishing and Enrich Publishing are part of Enrich Culture Group (Chinese: 天窗文化集團). Another sister company, Enrich Professional Publishing, Inc., was based in Honolulu, Hawaii. According to the company, Enrich Publishing was founded in 2004, while Enrich Professional Publishing was founded in 2009. Enrich Professional Publishing is an imprint for books in English language. Despite using different companies in Singapore and the United States to publish, their books, such as Poon's and Zhang's, are printed in Hong Kong.

== Overview ==
It specializes in academic and reference works on the economic, financial and business development taking place in the Greater China Region. Its published Chinese authors include scholars, including top businessmen, including Chi Lo; and experts from within the Chinese government, including Cheng Siwei and Li Tieying. EPP translates these Chinese academic works to provide English readers with unique Chinese perspectives and extensive first-hand information.

EPP has a publishing volume of over 50 new titles every year. EPP's readers include executives, economists, entrepreneurs, investors, researchers, businesspeople, academics and postgraduate students.

EPP partners with Renmin University Press in publishing theoretical and research titles, including Studies on Economic Reform and Development in China by Cheng Siwei, Chairman of International Finance Forum (China); and Reforming China by Li Tieying, Vice Chairman of the Standing Committee of the National People’s Congress of China.

EPP's imprint, Silkroad Press, publishes English versions of distinguished Chinese works in humanities, including the series A Concise History of the Qing Dynasty.

== List of notable publications ==
- Poon, Alice (2011). Written at Richmond (BC). Land and the Ruling Class in Hong Kong (hardback) (2nd ed.). Singapore, Hong Kong: Enrich Professional Publishing. ISBN 978-981-4339-10-0.
- Zhang, Joe (2014). Cheng, Janet; Griffith, Glenn (eds.). Inside China's Shadow Banking: The Next Subprime Crisis. Honolulu, Hong Kong: Enrich Professional Publishing. ISBN 978-1-62320-016-9.
