= Xinwen Bao =

Defunct newspaper in Shanghai

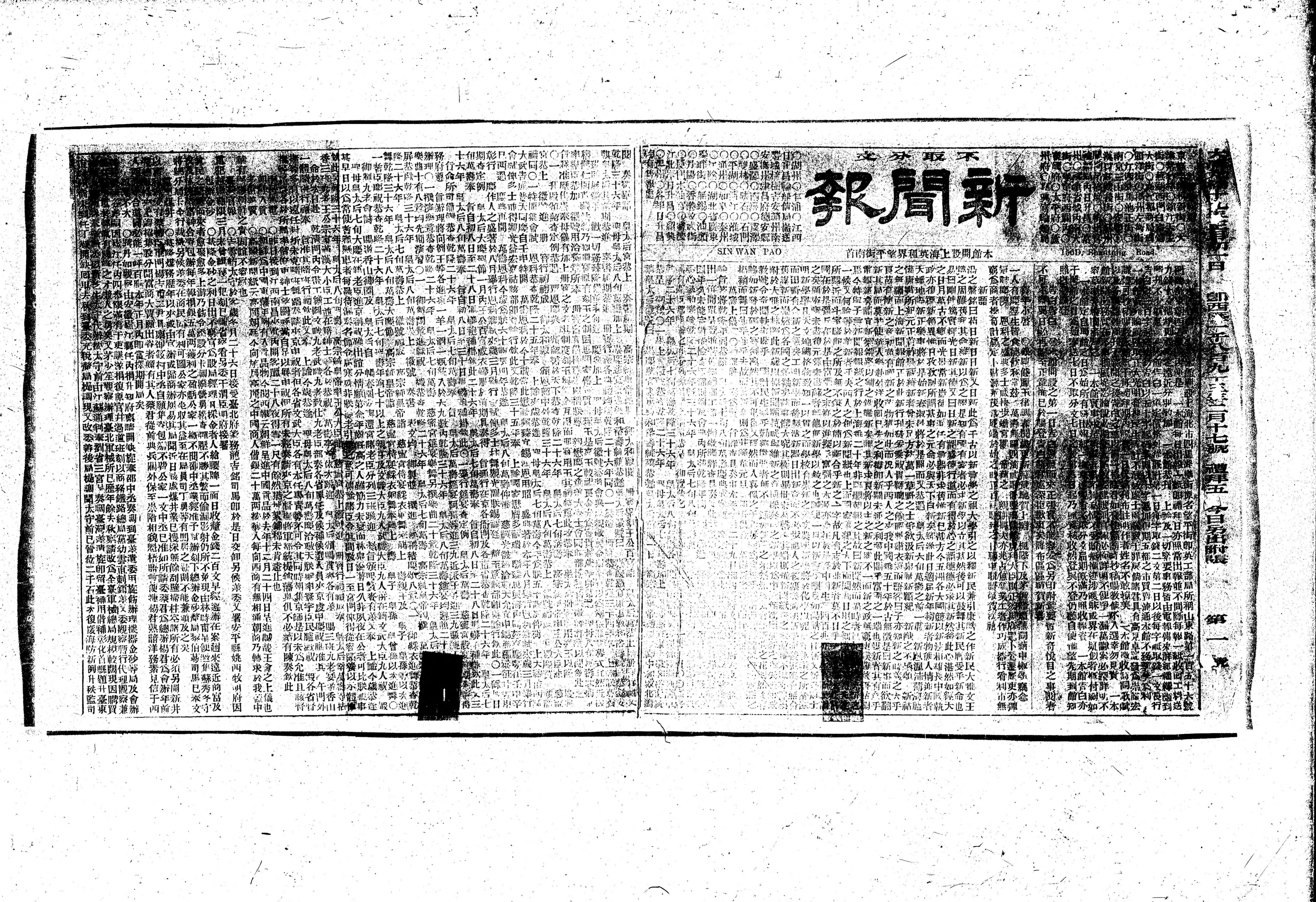
- Xinwen Bao, Issue 1
- Native name
- Traditional Chinese: 新聞報
- Simplified Chinese: 新闻报
- Literal meaning: News Report
Transcriptions
Standard Mandarin
- Hanyu Pinyin: Xīnwén Bào
- Wade–Giles: Hsin^{1}-wên^{2} pao^{4}
- IPA: [ɕín.wə̌n pʰâʊ]
- Founded: 17 February 1893
- Ceased publication: 1949
- Language: Written vernacular Chinese
- City: Shanghai
- Country: Republic of China
- Free online archives: Xinwen Bao at the Internet Archive

The Xinwen Bao (simplified Chinese: 新闻报; traditional Chinese: 新聞報; lit. 'News Report', also known in Wade-Giles romanization as Hsin Wen Pao) was a Chinese-language newspaper based in Shanghai that was published between 1893 and 1949. Aimed primarily at persons involved in business and commerce, it had a peak circulation of over 150,000 and was distributed throughout the Republic of China. The newspaper had a rivalry with the Shen Bao, another large Shanghai-based periodical.

== History ==
The Xinwen Bao was established in 1893. Headquartered in one of Shanghai's foreign concessions, the newspaper was established by a consortium of the textile merchant A. W. Danforth, journalist F. F. Ferris, and entrepreneur Zhang Shuhe. As a result of these foreign interests, it had a higher degree of press freedom than most Chinese-language newspapers. The first editor-in-chief was Cai Erkang, who had previously headed the North China Daily News's Chinese-language edition Hubao. Three typesetters were hired from the Hubao's staff. Another nine people were hired as journalists, and Ferris handled translation for the publication.

To prepare for publication, the founders of the Xinwen Bao appealed to their colleagues to submit news from throughout Qing China using private couriers. The first edition was issued on 17 February 1893 – the Lunar New Year, chosen because both the Hubao and its fellow major newspaper, the Shen Bao, were on hiatus. The first three issues were free of charge, with special shipments sent to government offices, large teahouses, and wealthy residents. Open sales of the Xinwen Bao began with its fourth issue.

Soon after its establishment, the Xinwen Bao established a rivalry with the older Shen Bao. Through 1893, batches of newspapers were shipped by paddleboat at midnight. Upon reaching Suzhou, some copies were taken for local readers, while others were sent further afield. This allowed the Xinwen Bao to reach markets outside Shanghai before its competitors. In 1930, the Xinwen Bao established an illustrated pictorial shortly after the Shen Bao had done likewise.

In 1927, when the Kuomintang (KMT) was using abduction to force the purchase of government bonds, the Xinwen Bao published a list of people who had been affected. It was subsequently censored by the Nanking-based government. After Shanghai was occupied by the Imperial Japanese Army, the occupying forces took control over the Xinwen Bao. When Japan surrendered in 1945, the KMT transformed the Xinwen Bao and Shen Bao into semi-official publications. The Xinwen Bao closed in 1949, the same year as the Shen Bao. Following the Shanghai Campaign, the Chinese Communist Party assumed control of the city and closed publications affiliated with the KMT.

== Contents and readership ==
Cai Erkang, the first editor-in-chief of the Xinwen Bao, claimed to have reached a thousand regular subscribers within four days of launch. Circulation data, conversely, shows a circulation of 300 copies per day in 1893, 3,000 copies per day in 1894, and 12,000 copies per day in 1895; readership may have been larger, as copies were often read by multiple people after being shared or resold. In 1933, Xinwen Bao had a circulation of 150,000, equivalent to that of the Shen Bao. It was thus one of the most widely circulated newspapers in the Republic of China.

The Xinwen Bao primarily targeted readers involved in business and commerce. In its initial design, it offered a layout similar to the Shen Bao, with one editorial and several headline stories on the front page. Its stories dealt with government affairs, literature, and commerce. In its coverage of the First Sino-Japanese War, it used literary language that evoked a detailed impression of battlefield conditions, albeit with several inaccuracies.

== Works cited ==
- Tong, Bing (2020). Journalism and Communication in China and the West: A Study of History, Education and Regulation. Springer. ISBN 978-981-15-7873-1.
- Coble, Parks M. (2020). The Shanghai Capitalists and the Nationalist Government, 1927–1937. Leiden: Brill. ISBN 978-1-68417-227-6.
- Hsu, Cho-yun (2012). China: A New Cultural History. Columbia University Press. ISBN 978-0-231-52818-4.
- Hung, Chang-tai (1994). War and Popular Culture: Resistance in Modern China, 1937–1945. Berkeley: University of California Press. ISBN 978-0-520-35486-9.
- Tsai, Weipin (2014). "The First Casualty: Truth, Lies and Commercial Opportunism in Chinese Newspapers during the First Sino-Japanese War". Journal of the Royal Asiatic Society of Great Britain & Ireland. 24: 145–163. doi:10.1017/S1356186313000515.
