= Alexander McCall Smith bibliography =

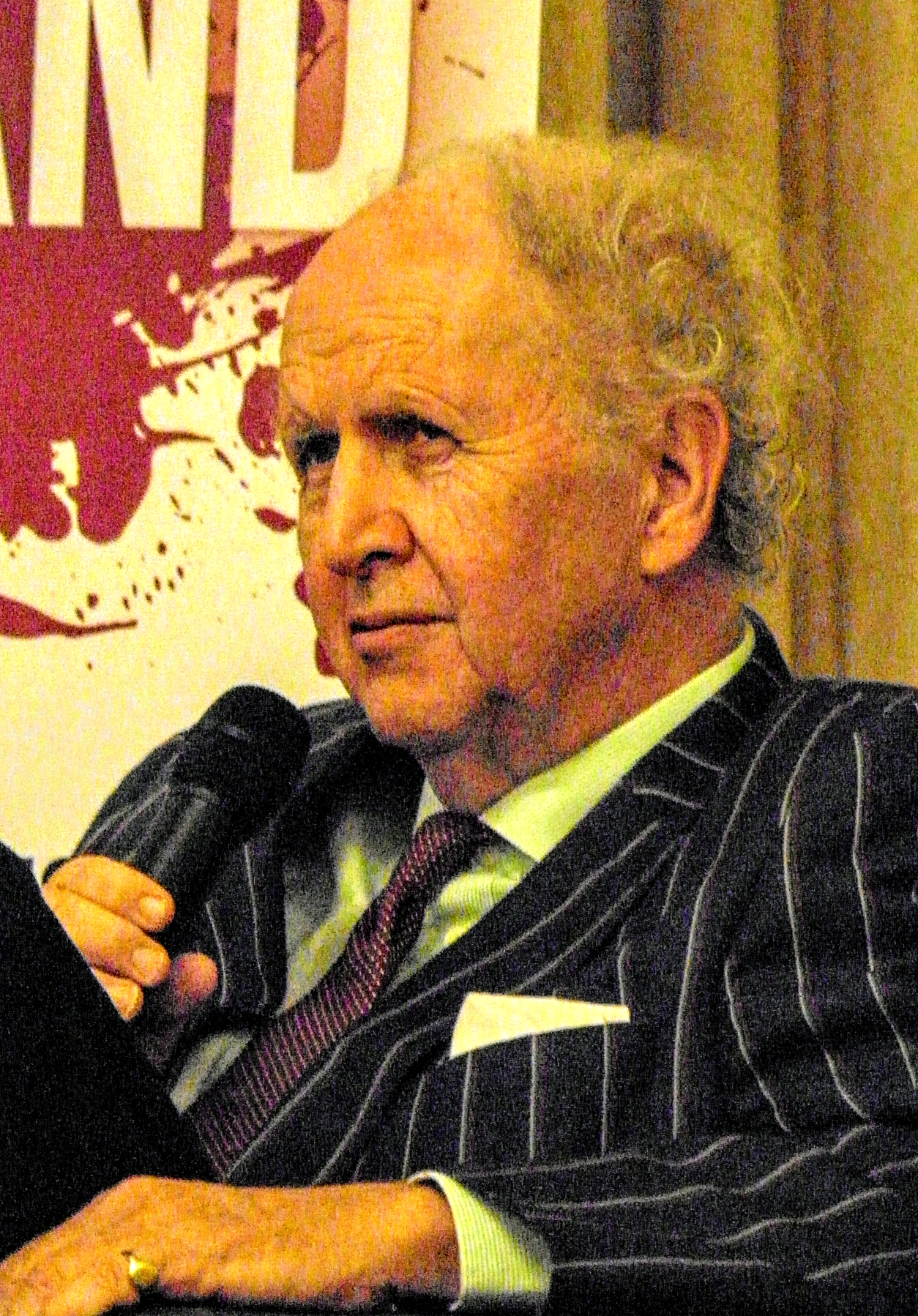
- McCall Smith at Bloody Scotland in 2018

The bibliography of Alexander McCall Smith, a Scottish legal scholar and author of fiction. He was raised in Southern Rhodesia (now Zimbabwe) and was formerly Professor of Medical Law at the University of Edinburgh. He became an expert on medical law and bioethics and served on related British and international committees. He has since become known as a fiction writer, with sales in English exceeding 40 million by 2010 and translations into 46 languages.

== Professor Dr von Igelfeld Entertainments series ==
1. 1997: Portuguese Irregular Verbs
2. 2003: The Finer Points of Sausage Dogs
3. 2003: At the Villa of Reduced Circumstances
4. 2011: Unusual Uses for Olive Oil
5. 2021: Your Inner Hedgehog
6. 2025: The Lost Language of Oysters
- 2004: The 2 1/2 Pillars of Wisdom – An omnibus edition of the first three von Igelfeld titles

== The No. 1 Ladies' Detective Agency series ==
1. 1998: The No. 1 Ladies' Detective Agency
2. 2000: Tears of the Giraffe
3. 2001: Morality for Beautiful Girls
4. 2002: The Kalahari Typing School for Men
5. 2003: The Full Cupboard of Life
6. 2004: In the Company of Cheerful Ladies (also known as: The Night-Time Dancer)
7. 2006: Blue Shoes and Happiness
8. 2007: The Good Husband of Zebra Drive
9. 2008: The Miracle at Speedy Motors
10. 2009: Tea Time for the Traditionally Built
11. 2010: The Double Comfort Safari Club
12. 2011: The Saturday Big Tent Wedding Party
13. 2012: The Limpopo Academy of Private Detection
14. 2013: The Minor Adjustment Beauty Salon
15. 2014: The Handsome Man's De Luxe Café
16. 2015: The Woman Who Walked in Sunshine
17. 2016: Precious and Grace
18. 2017: The House of Unexpected Sisters
19. 2018: The Colours of All the Cattle
20. 2019: To the Land of Long Lost Friends
21. 2020: How to Raise an Elephant
22. 2021: The Joy and Light Bus Company
23. 2022: A Song of Comfortable Chairs
24. 2023: From a Far and Lovely Country
25. 2024: The Great Hippopotamus Hotel
26. 2025: In the Time of Five Pumpkins
27. 2026: The Big Cats Dance Party

Extra: 2013: The Slice of No. 1 Celebration Storybook (ebook only)

== The Sunday Philosophy Club series ==
Also known as Isabel Dalhousie Mysteries

1. 2004: The Sunday Philosophy Club
2. 2005: Friends, Lovers, Chocolate
3. 2006: The Right Attitude to Rain
4. 2007: The Careful Use of Compliments
5. 2008: The Comfort of Saturdays (UK title) or: The Comforts of a Muddy Saturday (American title)
6. 2009: The Lost Art of Gratitude
7. 2010: The Charming Quirks of Others
8. 2011: The Forgotten Affairs of Youth
9. 2011: The Perils of Morning Coffee (ebook only)
10. 2012: The Uncommon Appeal of Clouds
11. 2015: The Novel Habits of Happiness
12. 2015: At the Reunion Buffet (ebook only)
13. 2016: Sweet, Thoughtful Valentine (ebook only)
14. 2017: A Distant View of Everything
15. 2018: The Quiet Side of Passion
16. 2020: The Geometry of Holding Hands
17. 2022: The Sweet Remnants of Summer
18. 2024: The Conditions of Unconditional Love

== 44 Scotland Street series ==
- See also: Bertie Pollock, 44 Scotland Street
1. 2005: 44 Scotland Street
2. 2005: Espresso Tales
3. 2006: Love Over Scotland
4. 2007: The World According to Bertie
5. 2008: The Unbearable Lightness of Scones
6. 2010: The Importance of Being Seven
7. 2011: Bertie Plays The Blues
8. 2012: Sunshine on Scotland Street
9. 2013: Bertie's Guide to Life and Mothers
10. 2015: The Revolving Door of Life
11. 2016: The Bertie Project
12. 2017: A Time of Love and Tartan
13. 2019: The Peppermint Tea Chronicles
14. 2020: A Promise of Ankles
15. 2021: Love in the Time of Bertie
16. 2022: The Enigma of Garlic
17. 2023: The Stellar Debut of Galactica MacFee
18. 2025: Bertie's Theory of Ice Cream
19. 2026: The Prime of Bertie Pollock

== Corduroy Mansions series ==
1. 2009: Corduroy Mansions
2. 2009: The Dog Who Came in from the Cold (published online daily in serial form; also published as a hardcover book on 1 May 2010)
3. 2011: A Conspiracy of Friends

== Paul Stuart series ==
1. 2016: My Italian Bulldozer
2. 2019: The Second Worst Restaurant in France

== Detective Varg series ==
1. 2019: The Strange Case of the Moderate Extremists (ebook only)
2. 2019: The Department of Sensitive Crimes (his given name is stylised as Älexander on the cover)
3. 2019: Varg in Love (ebook only)
4. 2020: The Talented Mr. Varg
5. 2021: The Man with the Silver Saab
6. 2023: The Discreet Charm of the Big Bad Wolf

== Perfect Passion Company series ==
- 2023: Cook for Me (ebook only)
- 2024: The Perfect Passion Company
- 2025: Looking For You: A Novel

== Other novels ==
- 2008: La's Orchestra Saves the World
- 2012: Trains and Lovers
- 2014: The Forever Girl
- 2014: Fatty O'Leary's Dinner Party
- 2015: Emma: A Modern Retelling
- 2017: The Good Pilot, Peter Woodhouse
- 2022: The Pavilion in the Clouds
- 2023: The Private Life of Spies
- 2024: The Love Story of Herb la Fouche
- 2024: The Winds from Further West
- 2025: The Private Side of Friendship
- 2026: The Isle of Good Karma

== Short stories ==
- 2011: "The Strange Story of Bobby Box" (a short story published in the young adult anthology What You Wish For)

== Short story collections ==
- 1989: Children of Wax: African Folk Tales
- 1995: Heavenly Date and Other Flirtations
- 2004: The Girl Who Married a Lion and Other Tales from Africa
- 2006: Baboons Who Went This Way and That (Tales from Africa)
- 2015: Chance Developments: Unexpected Love Stories
- 2016: Marvellous Mix-ups
- 2019: Pianos and Flowers
- 2020: Tiny Tales
- 2022: The Exquisite Art of Getting Even

== Anthologies ==
- 2006: One City (with Ian Rankin, Irvine Welsh and J. K. Rowling)

== Chapbooks ==
- 2022: The Captain's Cabin (a novella published by Out of the Blue Ltd. for the Jamie’s Farm charity)

== Children's novels ==
- 1980: The White Hippo
- 1982: The Little Theatre
- 1984: The Perfect Hamburger
- 1987: On the Road
- 1988: Alix and the Tigers
- 1988: Film Boy
- 1988: Mike's Magic Seeds
- 1989: Uncle Gangster
- 1990: Jeffrey's Joke Machine
- 1990: Suzy's Magician
- 1990: The Ice-Cream Bicycle
- 1990: The Tin Dog
- 1991: Marzipan Max
- 1991: The Spaghetti Tangle
- 1992: Calculator Annie
- 1992: Springy Jane
- 1992: The Doughnut Ring
- 1992: The Princess Trick
- 1993: My Chameleon Uncle (with Elke Counsell)
- 1993: The Muscle Machine
- 1994: Crazy Crocs (with Malorie Blackman)
- 1994: Paddy and the Ratcatcher
- 1994: Teacher Trouble
- 1994: The Banana Machine
- 1994: Who Invented Peanut Butter?
- 1995: Billy Rubbish
- 1996: The Bubblegum Tree
- 1996: The Watermelon Boys
- 1999: The Popcorn Pirates
- 2000: Monkey Boy
- 2006: Dream Angus
- 2014: Good Dog lion
- 2015: Explosive Adventures
- 2016: Boing Boing
- 2016: Marvellous Mix-ups
- 2016: Freddie Mole, Lion Tamer
- 2018: Hari and his Electric Feet
- 2018: Max Champion and the Great Race Car Robbery
- 2020: Noah Wild and the Floating Zoo

=== Akimbo ===
1. 1990: Akimbo and the Elephants
2. 1992: Akimbo and the Lions
3. 1993: Akimbo and the Crocodile Man
4. 2007: Akimbo and the Snakes
5. 2008: Akimbo and the Baboons

=== Harriet Bean ===
1. 1990: The Five Lost Aunts of Harriet Bean (with Jean Baylis)
2. 1991: Harriet Bean and the League of Cheats (with Jean Baylis)
3. 1993: The Cowgirl Aunt of Harriet Bean (with Jean Baylis)

=== Max & Maddy ===
1. 1997: Max & Maddy and the Bursting Balloons Mystery
2. 1999: Max & Maddy and the Chocolate Money Mystery

=== Young Precious Ramotswe ===
1. 2010: Precious and the Puggies (republished in 2011 as: Precious and the Monkeys, and in 2012 as The Great Cake Mystery)
2. 2012: Precious and the Mystery of Meerkat Hill
3. 2013: Precious and the Mystery of the Missing Lion
4. 2015: Precious and the Zebra Necklace
- 2021: Young Precious- The Collected Adventures, omnibus collecting all Young Precious stories

=== School Ship Tobermory ===
1. 2015: School Ship Tobermory
2. 2016: The Sands of Shark Island
3. 2018: The Race to Kangaroo Cliff
4. 2019: The Secret of the Dark Waterfall

=== Big-Top Mysteries ===
1. 2019: The Case of the Vanishing Granny
2. 2019: The Great Clown Conundrum

== Memoir/literary appreciation ==
- 2013: What Auden Can Do for You

== Poetry ==
- 2020: In a Time of Distance: And Other Poems
- 2023: I Think of You and Other Poems

=== Anthologies ===
- 2018: A Gathering: A Personal Anthology of Scottish Poems, ed.

== Other ==
- 2014: A Work of Beauty: Alexander McCall Smith's Edinburgh
- 2017: Who Built Scotland: Twenty-Five Journeys in Search of a Nation (with Kathleen Jamie, Alistair Moffat, James Robertson and James Crawford)
- 2018: The Tumbling Lassie (operetta; music by Tom Cunningham, libretto by McCall Smith)

== Academic texts ==
- 1978: Power and Manoeuvrability (with Tony Carty)
- 1983: Law and Medical Ethics (with J. Kenyon Mason) (this text has gone through several editions: an eighth, by Mason and Graeme Laurie, was published in 2010; McCall Smith contributed to the first six editions)
- 1987: Butterworths Medico-Legal Encyclopaedia (with J. Kenyon Mason)
- 1990: Family Rights: Family Law and Medical Advances (editor with Elaine Sutherland)
- 1991: All About Drink and Drug Abuse (educational text)
- 1992: Scots Criminal Law (with David H Sheldon, second edition published 1997)
- 1992: The Criminal Law of Botswana (with Kwame Frimpong)
- 1993: Duty to Rescue: the Jurispendence of Aid (editor with Michael A. Menlowe, 1993)
- 1997: Forensic Aspects of Sleep (editor with Colin Shapiro)
- 2000: Justice and the Prosecution of Old Crimes (with Daniel W. Shuman)
- 2001: Errors, Medicine and the Law (with Alan Merry)
- 2003: A Draft Criminal Code for Scotland (with Eric Clive, Pamela Ferguson and Christopher Gane)
- 2004: Creating Humans: Ethical Questions where Reproduction and Science Collide (collected lectures, audio recordings)
