= The No. 1 Ladies' Detective Agency (radio series) =

The No. 1 Ladies' Detective Agency is a series of radio programmes, based on the series of novels of the same name by Alexander McCall Smith.

McCall Smith himself dramatised the series for BBC Radio 4. Thirty-five episodes have been broadcast, the first on 10 September 2004, and the most recent on 23 September 2019. The episodes encompass the first to the nineteenth books. Claire Benedict plays Mma Ramotswe for most of the episodes up to 2016, with Janice Acquah playing the lead for the 2010 episodes, and from 2017 onwards.

== Episodes ==
Date first broadcast	Title	Director	Cast	Synopsis
10 September 2004	The Daddy	Gaynor Macfarlane	Claire Benedict, Nadine Marshall, Joseph Marcell, Janice Acquah, Gbemisola Ikumelo, Jude Akuwudike, Chuk Iwuji, Maynard Eziashi, Peter Gevisser, Noma Dumezweni, Emmanuel Ighodaro, Willie Jonah, Ben Thomas, Alibe Parsons, Bhasker Patel, Nancy Crane, Tehmina Sacranie and Heather Mann	Precious Ramotswe, owner and founder of The No. 1 Ladies' Detective Agency, takes on her first case – and a new secretary.
17 September 2004	The Bone	Gaynor Macfarlane	Claire Benedict	Precious Ramotswe, owner and founder of The No. 1 Ladies' Detective Agency, sets out to discover the truth about Nandira Patel's boyfriend and to solve the case of the mysterious bone.
24 September 2004	The Maid	Gaynor Macfarlane	Claire Benedict	Mma Ramotswe, owner and founder of The No. 1 Ladies' Detective Agency, has good news. However, she must also face a scheming maid, find out the truth behind a doctor's erratic behaviour and take on a new case about a missing American.
1 October 2004	Tears of the Giraffe	Gaynor Macfarlane	Claire Benedict	Mr JLB Matekoni has a surprise for Mma Ramotswe, owner and founder of The No. 1 Ladies' Detective Agency. Meanwhile, the case of the missing American man has still to be solved.
30 August 2005	The Chief Justice of Beauty	Gaynor Macfarlane	Claire Benedict	Precious Ramotswe, owner and founder of The No 1 Ladies' Detective Agency, is worried about her fiancé, Mr J L B Matekoni. Meanwhile, Mma Makutsi takes on a case for the Chief Justice of Beauty.
6 September 2005	The Confession	Gaynor Macfarlane	Claire Benedict and Joseph Marcell	Precious Ramotswe, owner and founder of The No. 1 Ladies' Detective Agency, has to find two women wronged in the past by her client, Mr Molefelo.
13 September 2005	The Kalahari Typing School for Men	Gaynor Macfarlane	Claire Benedict	Precious Ramotswe, owner and founder of The No. 1 Ladies' Detective Agency, discovers that the agency has competition, and Mma Makutsi embarks on an entrepreneurial enterprise.
20 September 2005	The Admirer	Gaynor Macfarlane	Claire Benedict	Precious Ramotswe, owner and founder of The No. 1 Ladies' Detective Agency, makes an unhappy discovery and Mma Makutsi finds an admirer at the Kalahari Typing School for Men.
18 January 2007	How to Handle Men through the Application of Psychology	Kirsty Williams	Claire Benedict, Nadine Marshall, Joseph Marcell, Janice Acquah, Adjoa Andoh, Gbemisola Ikumelo, Chuk Iwuji and Kedar Williams-Stirling	Precious Ramotswe, owner and founder of The No. 1 Ladies' Detective Agency, sets out to release her fiancé, Mr JLB Matekoni, from a terrifying obligation. Meanwhile, a new case comes into the agency and the ladies find themselves on a love quest.
25 January 2007	House of Hope	Kirsty Williams	Claire Benedict, Nadine Marshall, Joseph Marcell, Janice Acquah, Jude Akuwudike and Noma Dumezweni	Mma Ramotswe and her assistant Mma Makutsi visit some bad girls in their quest to find a husband for their client. But Mma Ramotswe has some marriage problems of her own. When her fiancé seems no closer to setting a date for their wedding, she seeks the advice of a crafty friend.
1 February 2007	The Return of Note	Kirsty Williams	Claire Benedict, Nadine Marshall, Janice Acquah, Jude Akuwudike, Adjoa Andoh, Chuk Iwuji, Alibe Parsons, Danny Sapani and Ben Thomas	Mma Ramotswe finds herself in a compromising situation when her past catches up with her. But things are looking brighter for her assistant, Mma Makutsi, when she takes up ballroom dancing.
8 February 2007	The Ceremony	Kirsty Williams	Claire Benedict, Nadine Marshall, Joseph Marcell, Janice Acquah, Jude Akuwudike, Nikki Amuka-Bird, Patrice Naiambana and Danny Sapani	With her agency work under control, Mma Ramotswe has time at last to take care of her own problems. Can she release her fiancé, Mr JLB Matekoni, from his rash undertaking to do a charity parachute jump? And will the return of an old love jeopardise her plan to spring a romantic surprise on her husband-to-be?
1 January 2008	There Is No Such Thing as Free Food	Gaynor Macfarlane	Claire Benedict, Nadine Marshall, Ben Onwukwe, Janice Acquah, Jude Akuwudike, Ayesha Antoine, Sam Dale, Maynard Eziashi, Gbemisola Ikumelo, Paterson Joseph and Kedar Williams-Stirling	Precious Ramotswe, owner and founder of The No. 1 Ladies' Detective Agency, is preoccupied both professionally and personally by the subject of food.
2 January 2008	The Best Profession for a Blackmailer	Gaynor Macfarlane	Claire Benedict, Nadine Marshall, Janice Acquah, Maynard Eziashi, Adjoa Andoh, Paterson Joseph and Alibe Parsons	Mr Polopetsi, part-time mechanic and would-be assistant detective, takes on a case of his own. Mma Makutsi finds out whether blue shoes are the key to happiness.
3 January 2008	A Very Rude Woman	Gaynor Macfarlane	Claire Benedict, Nadine Marshall, Janice Acquah, Ben Onwukwe, Adjoa Andoh, Noma Dumezweni, Maynard Eziashi, Chuk Iwuji, Paterson Joseph and Alibe Parsons	Precious Ramotswe faces change at the agency while Mr J L B Matekoni meets the rudest person in Botswana.
4 January 2008	Talking Shoes	Gaynor Macfarlane	Claire Benedict, Nadine Marshall, Ben Onwukwe, Janice Acquah, Adjoa Andoh, Anna Bengo, Noma Dumezweni, William Gaminara, Chuk Iwuji, Paterson Joseph, Naomi Taylor and Ben Thomas	A new detective takes on a case for the agency while Mma Ramotswe, among others, has a problem with high blood pressure.
25 December 2008	The Miracle at Speedy Motors	Gaynor Macfarlane	Claire Benedict, Nadine Marshall, Ben Onwukwe, Janice Acquah, Jude Akuwudike, Adjoa Andoh, Anna Bengo, Noma Dumezweni, Maynard Eziashi, Emmanuel Ighodaro, Chuk Iwuji and Alibe Parsons	Precious Ramotswe, owner and founder of The No. 1 Ladies' Detective Agency, is preoccupied – by the absence of postboxes in Botswana, by an anonymous letter and by an adopted child's poignant search for her true family. Meanwhile, Mr JLB Matekoni pursues an expensive cure for their foster daughter Motholeli.
25 December 2009	Tea Time for the Traditionally Built	Eilidh McCreadie	Claire Benedict, Nadine Marshall, Ben Onwukwe, Janice Acquah, Mo Sesay, Nyasha Hatendi, Kedar Williams-Stirling, Emmanuel Ighodaro and Anna Bengo	Precious Ramotswe, owner and founder of The No. 1 Ladies' Detective Agency, is about to get in over her head. She's got an important new client from the incomprehensible world of football, but she's on her own as her loyal assistant Mma Makutsi is distracted by the return of a troublesome figure from her past.
25 December 2009	The Seller of Beds	Eilidh McCreadie	Claire Benedict, Nadine Marshall, Ben Onwukwe, Mo Sesay, Gbemisola Ikumelo, Beru Tessema, Albie Parsons, Kedar Williams-Stirling, Emmanuel Ighodaro, Tyrone Lewis, Anna Bengo and Nyasha Hatendi	The detectives are embroiled in the murky world of the football cheat as they investigate the recent bad form of the Kalahari Swoopers. But Mma Ramotswe's problems don't end there – she must confront an issue which has been avoided for too long. Could it be the end of the road for the tiny white van?
2 December 2010	An Exceptionally Wicked Lady	Gaynor Macfarlane	Janice Acquah, Nadine Marshall, Ben Onwukwe, Sam Dale, Jude Akuwudike, Maynard Eziashi, Anna Bengo, Noma Dumezweni, Adjoa Andoh, Babou Ceesay and Nyasha Hatendi	Mma Ramotswe and Mma Makutsi face an old adversary while a letter from America sets the agency a seemingly impossible task.
3 December 2010	Canoeing for Ladies	Gaynor Macfarlane	Janice Acquah, Nadine Marshall, Ben Onwukwe, Maynard Eziashi, Nyasha Hatendi, Obi Abili, Chuk Iwuji, Jude Akuwudike, Anna Bengo, Noma Dumezweni and Adjoa Andoh	Mma Ramotswe and Mma Makutsi have to face the dangers of crocodiles, hippos and a tiny canoe as their case takes them to the Okovango Delta to trace a safari guide. There is also the problem of Phuti's aunt to solve, as well as the necessity of confronting their old adversary, Violet Sepotho.
3 November 2011	A Late Van Just Glimpsed	Gaynor Macfarlane	Claire Benedict, Nadine Marshall, Ben Onwukwe, Janice Acquah, Adjoa Andoh, Maynard Eziashi and Nyasha Hatendi	Mma Ramotswe makes a ghostly sighting and there is disturbing news about Charlie, Mr JLB Matekoni's wayward apprentice and the ladies investigate unexplained, violent attacks on cattle. Meanwhile, preparations are underway for Mma Makutsi's wedding to Phuti Radiphuti, but tragedy awaits outside the shoe shop.
4 November 2011	The Saturday Big Tent Wedding	Gaynor Macfarlane	Claire Benedict, Nadine Marshall, Ben Onwukwe, Janice Acquah, Adjoa Andoh, Maynard Eziashi, Nyasha Hatendi, Obi Abili, Beru Tessema, Jude Akuwudike and Gbemisola Ikumelo	The ladies solve the case of the murdered cattle. Mma Makutsi is feeling anxious about her upcoming wedding to Phuti Radiphuti and an old friend comes to the rescue. And Charlie is let off the hook.
20 March 2013	A Man from a Far Place	Gaynor Macfarlane	Claire Benedict, Nadine Marshall, Ben Onwukwe, Maynard Eziashi, Beru Tessema, Janice Acquah, Babou Ceesay, Sam Dale, Eleanor Crooks and Jude Akuwudike	Mma Ramotswe and Mma Makutsi receive a visit from an extremely important person – a hero, as it happens, of the two detectives at the No.1 Ladies' Detective Agency. Mma Potokwani has had bad news at the Orphan Farm. And one of Mr J.L.B. Matekoni's apprentices, Fanwell, gets himself into deep water.
21 March 2013	The Limpopo Academy of Private Detection	Gaynor Macfarlane	Claire Benedict, Nadine Marshall, Ben Onwukwe, Janice Acquah, Maynard Eziashi, Beru Tessema, Sam Dale, Obi Abili, Adjoa Andoh, Nyasha Hatendi, Jude Akuwudike and Babou Ceesay	Mma Ramotswe and Mma Makutsi have received a visit from an extremely important person – a hero of the two detectives at the No.1 Ladies' Detective Agency. Mma Potokwani has had bad news at the Orphan Farm and the ladies are determined to help her. And Mr J.L.B. Matekoni sets out to clear the name of his apprentice, Fanwell.
5 February 2014	The Modern Husband Course	Eilidh McCreadie	Claire Benedict, Nadine Marshall, Ben Onwukwe, Adjoa Andoh, Jude Akuwudike, Maynard Eziashi, Eleanor Crooks, Anna Bengo, Steve Toussaint and Janice Acquah	Mr J.L.B. Matekoni embarks on a quest for self-improvement, with a little encouragement from Mma Ramotswe. Mma Makutsi settles into her new house while hiding a secret from her best friend.
6 February 2014	The Minor Adjustment Beauty Salon	Eilidh McCreadie	Claire Benedict, Nadine Marshall, Janice Acquah, Eleanor Crooks, Maynard Eziashi, Noma Dumezweni, Steve Toussaint and Alibe Parsons	Mma Ramotswe searches for answers as the campaign against Mma Soleti steps up a gear. Meanwhile, the Agency welcomes a new arrival, and an old wrong is finally righted.
12 March 2015	The Handsome Man's Deluxe Cafe	Eilidh McCreadie	Claire Benedict, Nadine Marshall, Janice Acquah, Ben Onwukwe, Maynard Eziashi, Jude Akuwudike, Kulvinder Ghir, Sudha Bhuchar and Steve Toussaint	New mother Mma Makutsi expands her business portfolio in an unexpected direction. Meanwhile, Mma Ramotswe meets a client with a problematic house guest.
13 March 2015	The Dish of Yesterday	Eilidh McCreadie	Claire Benedict, Nadine Marshall, Janice Acquah, Ben Onwukwe, Maynard Eziashi, Jude Akuwudike, Amaka Okafor, Kulvinder Ghir, Obi Abili and Anna Bengo	Mma Ramotswe decides to put her new intern on the case, while Mma Makutsi's distinctive approach to the restaurant business raises eyebrows.
4 August 2016	This Is Not a Rubbish Boy	Gaynor Macfarlane	Claire Benedict, Nadine Marshall, Ben Onwukwe, Steve Toussaint, Kai Francis-Lewis, Janice Acquah and Eleanor Crooks	Mma Ramotswe has to come to terms with one of the most difficult situations that she has ever faced – taking a holiday.
5 August 2016	The Woman Who Walked in Sunshine	Gaynor Macfarlane	Claire Benedict, Nadine Marshall, Ben Onwukwe, Steve Toussaint, Janice Acquah, Jason Barnett and Clare Perkins	Mma Ramotswe is technically on holiday from the Agency but that does not stop her from stepping in to rescue an orphaned boy, or from taking on an important case.
19 July 2017	The Fat Cattle Club	Gaynor Macfarlane	Janice Acquah, Nadine Marshall, Ben Onwukwe, Steve Toussaint and Sarah Niles	
20 July 2017	Precious and Grace	Gaynor Macfarlane	Janice Acquah, Nadine Marshall, Ben Onwukwe, Steve Toussaint and Sarah Niles	
16 September 2019	House of Unexpected Sisters	Eilidh McCreadie	Janice Acquah, Nadine Marshall, Ben Onwukwe, Steve Toussaint, Sarah Niles, Saffron Coomber, Lorna Gayle	Mma Ramotswe dips a toe into the murky world of local politics as the Agency investigates a case of unfair dismissal in a new dramatisation from Alexander McCall Smith.
23 September 2019	The Colours of All the Cattle	Eilidh McCreadie	Janice Acquah, Nadine Marshall, Ben Onwukwe, Steve Toussaint and Sarah Niles	As election day approaches, Mma Ramotswe struggles with conflicted feelings over an old family mystery.
