= Nyasha Hatendi =

Zimbabwean-American actor (b. 1981)

- Born: 14 September 1981 (age 45); Washington, D.C., U.S.
- Citizenship: British; American
- Education: Royal Academy of Dramatic Art
- Occupations: Actor; producer
- Years active: 1999–present
- Father: David Hatendi

Nyasha Hatendi ("Ñah-shah, nya-sha") (born 14 September 1981) is a Zimbabwean-British-American actor, director, writer and producer.

== Early life and education ==
Hatendi was born on 14 September 1981 in Washington, D.C. Hatendi grew up in three countries, the United States, the United Kingdom and Zimbabwe. He graduated from the Royal Academy of Dramatic Arts in London.

== Filmography ==
=== Films ===
Year	Title	Role	Notes	Ref.
2001	Emil and the Detectives		Production assistant	
2006	The Good Shepherd	Thomas Lumumba	Uncredited	
2007	Birds and Bees		Short; producer	
2007	And the Woods Fell Silent Again	Mr. Shingles	Short	
2007	The Three Dumas	Narrator, Christophe		
2008	Love Is Rare		Short; producer	
2010	The Ghost Writer	Josh		
2012	The Comedian	Actor		
2013	To Leech	Stewart	Short	
2013	The Busker & the Coin		Associate producer	
2013	Magpie	Ike	Short; also producer	
2014	Centurion Resurrection		Short; producer	
2015	Narcopolis	Aldiss		
2018	The Front Runner	Roy Valentine		
2018	Replicas	Scott		
2021	Swan Song	Andre		
2023	Genie	Pete		

=== Television ===
Year	Title	Role	Notes	Ref.
2005	Holby City	Craig Miller	Episode: "7 Days Later"	
2008	Clive Hole	Clayton	TV movie	
2009	The No. 1 Ladies' Detective Agency	Doctor Sibenke	Episode: "Poison"	
2010	Silent Witness	Alex Webb	2 episodes: "Run: Part I" and "Run: Part II"	
2010	Blood and Oil	Noel Ijeoma	TV movie	
2011	Law & Order: UK	Jermaine Smart	Episode: "Deal"	
2011	Garrow's Law	Hubert Nicholson	Series 3, episode 4	
2011	Fast Freddie, the Widow and Me	Doctor David	TV movie	
2012	Above Suspicion	Daniel Edwards	Episode: "Silent Scream: Part 1"	
2012	Strike Back	Christian Lucas	Episode: "Strike Back: Vengeance"	
2014	W1A	Reporter	Series 1, episode 2	
2015–2018	Casual	Leon	Main role	
2017	King Charles III	Paul	TV movie	
2018	Squinters	Davis	6 episodes	
2018	Black Earth Rising	Godwin Hall	2 episodes	
2018	Into the Dark	Wilson Clowes	Episode: "Pooka!"	
2020	SpongeBob SquarePants	Hieronymus Glove (voice)	Episode: "Escape from Beneath Glove World"	
2020–2024	Alex Rider	Smithers	Main role	
2021	Made for Love	Keegan James	Episode: "I Want This Thing Out of My Head"	
2023	Hunters	Oliver Frankel	Episode: "The Trial of Adolf Hitler"	
2026	Agatha Christie's Seven Dials	Dr Cyril Matip	Miniseries	

=== Video games ===
Year	Title	Role	Notes	Ref.
2014	Dreamfall Chapters: The Longest Journey	Baruti Maphane	Voice	
2017	Mass Effect: Andromeda	Jaal Ama Darav	Voice	

=== Radio ===
Year	Title	Role(s)	Director	Notes	Ref.
2008	Paid Servant	Hardwick	Jessica Dromgoole	BBC Radio 4	
2008	Dickens Confidential	Various	Various	BBC Radio 4	
2008	The Way We Live Right Now	Paul Montague	Jonquil Panting	BBC Radio 4	
2008	The Incomparable Witness	George	Sasha Yevtushenko	BBC Radio 4	
2008	Shredder	Adam	Jane Morgan	BBC Radio 4	
2008	Listen to the Words	Derek	Jessica Dromgoole	BBC Radio 4	
2008	Piper Alpha	Various	Toby Swift	BBC Radio 3	
2008	The Portrait of a Lady	Edward Rosier	Tracey Neale	BBC Radio 4	
2008	I Wish to Apologise for My Part in the Apocalypse	Various	Sam Hoyle	BBC Radio 4	
2008	One Chord Wonders: Television's Over	Town Clerk	Toby Swift		
2008	The Black Sheep	Baruch	Bruce Young	BBC Radio 4	
2008	Tobias Smollett - The Expedition of Humphry Clinker	Various	Marc Beeby	BBC Radio 4	
2008	The Dig	Reid Moir	Jeremy Mortimer	BBC Radio 4	
2008	Old Peter's Russian Tales	Ivan	Jessica Dromgoole	BBC Radio 4	
2009	Scoop	Paleologue	Sally Avens		
2009	Safety Catch	Julius (Oxfam Speaker)	Dawn Ellis	BBC Radio 4	
2009	Statement of Regret	Idrissa	Alison Hindell	BBC Radio 4	
2009	The No. 1 Ladies' Detective Agency: Tea Time for the Traditionally Built	Phudi Radiputi	Eilidh McCreadie	BBC Radio 4	
2009	The No. 1 Ladies' Detective Agency: The Seller of Beds	Phudi Radiputi	Eilidh McCreadie	BBC Radio 4	
2010	The Postman of Good Hope	Grub	Sally Avens	BBC Radio 4	
2010	The No. 1 Ladies' Detective Agency: An Exceptionally Wicked Lady	Joe Bosilong	Gaynor Macfarlane	BBC Radio 4	
2010	The No. 1 Ladies' Detective Agency: Canoeing for Ladies	Boatman	Gaynor Macfarlane	BBC Radio 4	
2011	The Wire	Dylan	Jonquil Panting	BBC Radio 3	
2011	Brian Gulliver's Travels	Juror	Steven Canny		
2011	The Lost World	Maple White	Marilyn Imrie	BBC Radio 4	
2011	The Secret Grief	Stowaway	Sally Avens	BBC Radio 3	
2011	Leverage	Jamie	Sasha Yevtushenko		
2011	The Flood	Bootsey	Jessica Dromgoole	BBC Radio 3	
2011	Samson and Delilah	Gary	Jessica Dromgoole	BBC Radio 3	
2011	David and Goliath	Jase	Jessica Dromgoole	BBC Radio 3	
2011	The Mauritius Command	Midshipman George Johnson	Bruce Young	BBC Radio 4	
2011	Ten Lessons in Love	Young David	James Robinson	BBC Radio 4	
2011	Plantagenet: Series 2	John Hesselrig	Jessica Dromgoole and Jeremy Mortimer		
2011	Hearing Voices	David	Eoin O'Callaghan	BBC Radio 4	
2011	Serious Money	TK, Nigel Ajibala	Emma Harding	BBC Radio 3	
2011	The Porlock Poisoner	Samuel Gondo	Dirk Maggs	BBC World Service	
2011	Saint Joan	Brother Martin Ladvenu, Gilles De Rais aka Bluebeard	Jonquil Panting	BBC Radio 4	
2011	The No. 1 Ladies' Detective Agency: A Late Van Just Glimpsed	Mr Moeti	Gaynor Macfarlane	BBC Radio 4	
2011	The Saturday Big Tent Wedding	Mr Moeti	Gaynor Macfarlane	BBC Radio 4	
2011	Why Is the Sky So Blue?	Mr. Kachingwe	Marion Nancarrow		
2012	Sport and the British	Reader	Garth Brameld	BBC Radio 4	
2012	Dickens in London	Augustus Minns	BBC Radio 4		
2012	Sport and the British: Beating Us at Our Own Game	Reader	Garth Brameld	BBC Radio 4	
2012	The Strand Archive	Reader	Gemma Jenkins	BBC World Service	
2012	Crisis	Vincent	Sara Davies	BBC Radio 4	
2013	The Limpopo Academy of Private Detection	Lawyer	Gaynor Macfarlane	BBC Radio 4	
2013	Richard Tyrone Jones's Big Heart: Of Coke Dealers and Cardioverters	Nurse Farhan	Nick Walker	BBC Radio 4	
2015	The Cactus Flower	Tendai	Marion Nancarrow	BBC World Service	
2015	30 Eggs	Egg Vendor	Gemma McMullan	BBC Radio 4	

== Theatre ==
Year	Title	Role	Theatre(s)	Ref.
2000	Yonadab	King David	Bedlam Theatre	
2000	American Buffalo	Bobby	Bedlam Theatre	
2000	Kassandra	Private Brutal	Edinburgh Festival	
2000	The Actor's Nightmare	David Garrick	Bedlam Theatre	
2000	Dr. Faustus	Lucifer	Bedlam Theatre	
2005	As You Like It	Silvius	Theatre Royal, Bath; Peter Hall Company	
2006	The Winter's Tale	Mariner	Royal Shakespeare Company	
2006	Pericles	Thaliard	Royal Shakespeare Company	
2006	Real Black Men Don't Sit Cross Legged on the Floor	Dog	New Federal Theatre	
2007	The Brothers Size	Ogun	ATC; Young Vic	
2008	The Resistible Rise of Arturo Ui	Givola	Lyric Theatre (Hammersmith)	
2010	11 and 12	Mokthar	Theatre Bouffe Du Nord	
2010	The Ark	The Policeman	Arcola Theatre	
2013	The Epic Adventure of Nhamo the Manyika Warrior and His Sexy Wife Chipo	Specimen	Tricycle Theatre	
2014	King Charles III	Sir Gordon, Nick, Spencer	Almeida Theatre; Wyndham's Theatre; Broadway	

== Awards and nominations ==
Year	Awards	Category	Work	Outcome
2006	AUDELCO Awards	Best Ensemble	Real Black Men Don't Sit Cross Legged On the Floor	Won

== See also ==
- List of African-American actors
