= The Minor Adjustment Beauty Salon =

2013 novel by Alexander McCall Smith

- First edition
- Author: Alexander McCall Smith
- Language: English
- Series: The No. 1 Ladies' Detective Agency series
- Genre: Mystery
- Publisher: Little, Brown
- Publication date: October 2013
- Publication place: United Kingdom
- Media type: Print Hardback and e-book
- Pages: 256
- ISBN: 978-1-4087-0431-8
- Preceded by: The Limpopo Academy of Private Detection
- Followed by: The Handsome Man's De Luxe Café

The Minor Adjustment Beauty Salon is the fourteenth mystery novel by Alexander McCall Smith in The No. 1 Ladies' Detective Agency series, first published in 2013. The novel features the Motswana protagonist Precious Ramotswe and is set in Botswana.

Mma Ramotswe has two cases on hand, one to verify the identity of a boy as the heir to a large farm and the other to stop the smear campaign against the owner of the Minor Adjustment Beauty Salon, as it has stopped all customers from coming to her shop. Grace Makutsi is pregnant, but does not bring up the fact until late in her pregnancy, nor does she ever bring up the plan for her maternity leave. This gives Mma Ramotswe much to consider while her secretary and assistant is away with the baby. Mr JLB Matekoni contemplates whether he is a modern husband.

This novel drew a range of reactions from reviewers. Some viewed it positively, termed it "endearing", and considered the novel to have its strength in the characters and their love of Africa, rather than the deductions needed to solve the mysteries. By contrast, one reviewer considers this novel to show the reasons for the longevity of the series, with its sweet aspects but not omitting the harsh facts of life; "Forgiveness and generosity . . . are the answer to most of life’s ills", concludes Mma Ramotswe. The changes Mma Ramotswe must make in response to the changes life brings her, were the focus for another reviewer. Yet another reviewer focussed on some hilarious scenes in this novel and the close relationship between Mma Ramotswe and her husband.

The hardcover novel opened at number 5 on the New York Times Best Sellers in November 2013, and was on the NPR Hardcover Fiction Bestseller list for four weeks at the end of 2013.

== Plot summary ==
Mr JLB Matekoni and Mma Ramotswe notice that Grace Makutsi is pregnant, and has not mentioned it to her employer. Mma Ramotswe decides she will wait for Grace to speak up. Rather close to the delivery date, she does.

Mma Sheba Kutso arrives with a case for the agency. Edgar Molapo, a farmer, died a few months earlier. He left most of his estate, including his farm and cattle, to his nephew, the son of his late brother. Mma Sheba is not convinced that the young man who presents himself is this nephew. She asks them to resolve his identity so that his will can be carried out properly.

Grace Makutsi leaves the office early to rest, but finds a cobra under the bed. After the snake is killed, Grace goes into labor about 3 weeks early. Grace delivers a boy, to be called Itumelang Clovis Radiphuti. Phuti's aunt appears, but Phuti stands up for their choice for modern ways of caring for the infant, and she soon leaves. In the town to get a gift for the new baby, Mma Ramotswe sees the new location of the Minor Adjustment Beauty Salon, and speaks with the proprietor, Mma Soleti. The latter has received a bird feather in the mail, meaning someone wishes her ill. She is worried.

Mma Ramotswe meets the sister of the late Edgar Molapo at the farm. Mma Sheba said this sister had an early, failed marriage and has no children. The boy Liso takes Mma Ramotswe around the farm and talks with her. Once he refers to his aunt as his mother, and he speaks Setswana like a native, though the lawyer said the boy was born in Swaziland. Mma Ramotswe visits her friend Gwithie, who has also heard Liso say "my mother" when referring to his aunt, opening a new idea.

A visit to read the will on file reveals that the lawyer herself will inherit, if the boy is not the chosen nephew. Mma Ramotswe then visits Mma Silvia Potokwani at the orphan farm, where she learns that a housemother used to work at the Molapo farm. She tells a story that reveals a dark family secret. The brother and his son were both killed in the same accident in Swaziland, so Edgar never met that nephew. Instead, he was presented with Liso, who is the son of his sister. The dark family secret is that the boy is the result of Edgar sleeping one night with his sister, the reason for her pregnancy. Edgar never knew of this result of his mistaken action. Mma Ramotswe promises not to reveal any of these details, as does Mma Potokwani. Mma Ramotswe considers that the boy Liso is the person who came every summer to work on the farm, and is the person Edgar wanted to be his heir. She tells this to the lawyer without revealing the dark family story.

At the beauty salon, a smear campaign drives all customers away. The first idea is that Mma Manchwe, owner of the copy shop and prior wife of the husband of Mma Soleti, started it. Mma Manchwe flatly denies this. Mma Ramotswe learns from the real estate agent that Violet Sephoto has a lease ending soon, and might seek a nicer space by driving Mma Soleti out. Then the daughter of Mma Soleti's cousin, in training as a beautician, tells Mma Ramotswe about her conversations with the real estate office, where she learned who had offered bribes to break Mma Soleti's lease. Mma Ramotswe realizes both women need to settle the tensions about the husband. Mma Ramotswe will talk with Mma Manchwe, and suggests that Mma Soleti pay for an advertising brochure designed by her one-time rival.

Mr JLB Matekoni hears from two sources about a university class called How to Be a Modern Husband (Level 1), so he attends the first session. It is led by an angry woman who creates an uncomfortable mood for learning. He decides instead to cook a simple meal, to help out at home, first learning that mashed potatoes are mashed after they are cooked. His wife is coping without Mma Makutsi for the days after the baby arrives, but finds her to be irreplaceable, even with her various odd and annoying habits. When Grace begins to come to the office for a few hours a day with the baby, Mma Ramotswe decides that Grace should be her partner in the detective agency.

== Characters ==
- Mma Precious Ramotswe: She is the owner of the No. 1 Ladies' Detective Agency in Gaborone, Botswana, who is now in her 40s. She is self-taught as a detective, and generally successful in resolving the cases brought to her. In her youth, she married a musician who was cruel to her. She had a baby who died soon after birth, and learned she could have no more children. She is married to Mr JLB Matekoni. She drives a tiny white van which she bought back after briefly using a newer van. She is a woman of "traditional build" and one who values the traditions of her people even as her country changes so much.
- Obed Ramotswe: Late father of Precious, who was a strong and wise man. She loves him dearly and often thinks of him.
- Mr JLB Matekoni: Owner of Tlokweng Road Speedy Motors garage, and possibly the best mechanic in Botswana. He is the husband of Mma Ramotswe. He is a good man.
- Motholeli: One of two foster children being raised by Mr. J.L.B. Matekoni and Mma Ramotswe. Due to early health problems she moves about in a wheelchair. She is learning how to cook now. She was introduced in Tears of the Giraffe.
- Puso: Five years younger brother of Motholeli. He is a lively boy. He and his sister are of the Basarwa people of Gaborone, hunter-gatherers who live in the bush. He was introduced in Tears of the Giraffe.
- Mma Grace Makutsi: She is the secretary to Mma Ramotswe and an associate detective. She is very efficient, known for scoring 97 on her final exam at the secretarial college. She wears large glasses. She has good insight into many situations, but lacks the ease in viewing life that marks her employer. She married Phuti Radiphuti in an earlier novel, The Saturday Big Tent Wedding Party, and they moved into their own new home in The Limpopo Academy of Private Detection. She is in her early 30s.
- Phuti Radiphuti: He is the owner of the Double Comfort Furniture Company and of many cattle, who is married to Grace Makutsi. He is very happy to be a father.
- Mma Silvia Potokwane: Matron of the orphan farm outside Gaborone. She is a most persuasive woman, in seeking help for her orphans and keeping the place running. She is friends with both Mr J.L.B. Matekoni and Mma Ramotswe.
- Mmamodise: Presently a house mother at the orphan farm. In the past, she worked as cook for the Molano farm, where she learned the family's secrets.
- Charlie: An apprentice in the garage. He is in his mid 20s and for the first time, he shows his love of little babies.
- Fanwell: The younger of the two assistants, who is a certified mechanic.
- Mma Sheba Kutso: She is the attorney who is responsible for carrying out the will of the deceased farmer Rra Edgar Molapo. She met Mma Ramotswe a few years earlier, so she is called Mma Sheba.
- Mma Molapo: Sister of the late Edgar Molapo. She is a quiet woman with an interesting past.
- Liso Molapo: Nephew of the late Edgar Molapo who came summers as he grew up to help on the farm, and is the chosen heir for the farm and cattle. He is about 17 or 18 years old.
- Mmapuso: Also called Gwithie. She is a friend of Mma Ramotswe who lives adjacent to a game reserve, not far from the Molapo farm. She noted that Liso called his aunt, my mother, and then was embarrassed. Her name Mmapuso arises from her being the mother of a son named Puso, now late.
- Mma Soleti: She runs a beauty shop, the Minor Adjustment Beauty Salon, in Gaborone. She solicits help in stopping the smear campaign that blocks customers from her new location. She was introduced in The Limpopo Academy of Private Detection.
- Angela: Daughter of the cousin of Mma Soleti, who is being trained as a beautician. She spoke with the realtor who knew which person had offered him a bribe to break the contract for the lease with Mma Soleti.
- Violet Sephoto: Low scoring but attractive student at the Secretarial College when Grace Makutsi attended it. She is Grace's nemesis, and now has left a bad reputation behind her from her generally self-centered actions. Now she owns a dress shop. She is set up as the person to blame for the smear campaign, but for once she is not guilty.
- Mma Daisy Manchwe: Owner of the Clear Image copy shop in Gaborone, and first wife of the husband of Mma Soleti and the source of her troubles in business.

== Reviews ==
This novel received positive reviews, with comments that the story moves more slowly than those prior to it in this series of novels about the No. 1 Ladies’ Detective Agency. Reviewers find the strength and attraction of the novel in the way the author describes Africa and how the main characters are deeply involved in their culture and love the place where they live. One reviewer finds it a most endearing story. Others noticed the humour in the novel, while one saw the novel as having a melancholy tone, yet has all the characteristics that explain the longevity and popularity of this series of novels.

Publishers Weekly finds the main appeal of this novel to be the "irrepressible characters" and the deep love of Africa. The two cases, or story lines, in this novel, are considered to move along “as serviceably as Mma Ramotswe’s doughty white van to propel the story forward”, but the strength of the novel is in the “characters, intriguing local lore, and bone-deep love of Africa.”

Kirkus Reviews considers this novel to move more slowly than the prior 13 novels in this series, but does not consider that a drawback when the strength is the wisdom of Mma Ramotswe. It considers there are two and a half new cases for Mma Ramotswe, the half case being the changes brought to her detective agency by the arrival of Mma Makutsi’s new baby boy. The review sums up this novel by saying “A little slower-moving and more diffuse than many of the 13 preceding volumes in this celebrated series (The Limpopo Academy of Private Detection, 2012, etc.), but it’s no more than you’d expect from a heroine whose fleetness has never been as big a draw as her wisdom.” Yvonne Zipp writes that this novel "is a particularly endearing entry in the long-running series, which has lost none of its gentleness or its love for Botswana, of which McCall Smith clearly has fond memories." She notes the efforts of Mr JLB Matekoni to be a modern husband, going so far as to sit in one session of a class at the university, and Mma Ramotswe's musings on the status of her business, not losing money but not making a profit, as showing her wisdom. The author "takes his time with the plot, sprinkling in plenty of musings about what makes a good detective and what really constitutes “profit.”"

In a thoughtful review, Clea Simon suggests that this novel shows the reason for the "longevity" of The No. 1 Ladies' Detective Agency series: "Forgiveness and generosity, she [Mma Ramotswe] ultimately concludes, are the answer to most of life’s ills." Though many think of the series as sweet, Simon states that it "has always dealt with harsh reality." There is humour and optimism in this novel, and as well some sad details revealed; in this "quiet book, Ramotswe reveals an awareness that her foster daughter’s illness may shorten her life". A "pervasive melancholy", as Mma Ramotswe reviews her long association with her assistant and thinks about her own lost baby and her first painful marriage, is balanced by the description of her "practice of “Optimistic Accounting,” in which blessings are often tallied."

Marilyn Stasio highlights the issues faced by Mma Ramotswe when her long time assistant has a baby. Mma Ramotswe solves the two cases on hand on her own. Stasio reflects that Mma Ramotswe is "determined to remain as steadfast as a constellation in the night sky". But in the end, Mma Ramotswe concludes that she must make "momentous concessions".

Muriel Dobbin found that the author "indulges in several delightful plot twists in his latest portrayal of life" in the small African nation of Botswana. Dobbin appreciated the focus on the protagonist Mma Ramotswe and her husband, as he tries to be a modern husband, going so far as to take a class with that title, conducted by "the most unpleasant woman Mr McCall Smith has ever written about". Then he tries to make a meal at home, where "In a hilarious scene, Mma Ramotswe has to explain to her perplexed husband that his favorite mashed potatoes must be cooked first." He shifts to sausage and canned beans for his next try. In her cases, Dobbin concluded that Mma Ramotswe "remains tolerant even of those of whose behavior she cannot approve."

This novel opened at number 5, hardcover fiction, on The New York Times Best Sellers list. Beginning 14 November 2013, this novel was on the NPR Hardcover Fiction Bestseller List for four weeks.
