= Morality for Beautiful Girls =

Novel by Alexander McCall Smith

- First edition
- Author: Alexander McCall Smith
- Language: English
- Series: The No. 1 Ladies' Detective Agency series
- Genre: Detective, Mystery novel
- Publisher: Polygon Books
- Publication date: 2001
- Publication place: Scotland
- Media type: Print (Hardcover & Paperback), Audio Cassette & CD
- Pages: 256 first edition, paperback
- ISBN: 0-7486-6297-9 (first edition, paperback)
- OCLC: 46693682
- Dewey Decimal: 823/.914 21
- LC Class: PR6063.C326 M67 2001
- Preceded by: Tears Of The Giraffe (2000)
- Followed by: The Kalahari Typing School for Men (2002)

Morality for Beautiful Girls is the third detective novel in The No. 1 Ladies' Detective Agency series by Alexander McCall Smith, set in Gaborone, Botswana. The novel features the Motswana protagonist Mma Precious Ramotswe.

Her fiancé is struck down by depression, so Mma Ramotswe ensures he gets medical treatment and then appoints her secretary, Mma Makutsi, as acting manager of the garage. They had already decided to move the detective agency to office space in the garage, to cut expenses. Two cases are resolved, one by Mma Ramotswe and the other by Mma Makutsi, all on her own, as she manages the garage as well. Both women have opportunities to reflect on morality in modern Botswana. A boy with a strange history is brought to the orphan farm; Mr JLB Matekoni reaches out to him, teaching him language and making toys for him.

The novel was reviewed by the New York Times when this and the two prior novels were published in the US at once in 2002. The reviewer finds the writing to have "energy and eccentricity" but with "formal cadences [that] can sometimes slide into a languid drone". The author writes "about the variety and resilience of a nation to which Smith seems utterly devoted." The main character "Mma Ramotswe acts as much like Miss Manners as Miss Marple." Other reviews note that Mma Ramotswe is "a remarkably original character" and that McCall Smith's writing style is deceptively simple and direct, marked by "passages that have the power to amuse or shock or touch the heart, sometimes all at once". A review of the audio books in the US noted Mma Ramotswe's solutions of mysteries through her "finely honed sense of human frailty and simple wisdom" and finds the audio version is especially good for readers of this novel, as the accent on English from Botswana is unique.

== Plot summary ==
Mma Ramotswe's business, the No. 1 Ladies' Detective Agency, has clients but needs to cut costs and increase revenue from fees. To reduce costs, she and her fiancé Mr JLB Matekoni decide to move the agency to the garage, which has plenty of office space. The original office will in turn be let, to add income. Mma Makutsi, secretary, is given the title of assistant detective, with a rise in pay. Mr JLB Matekoni is behind on his paperwork, which Mma Makutsi can organize. He has been lethargic lately. Mma Ramotswe realizes he needs help, and sets out to help him. He will not agree to see the doctor, so Mma Ramotswe asks Mma Potokwane of the orphan farm to step in. Mma Potokwane brings him to Dr Moffat who diagnoses him as having depression, for which he steps back from his garage while medications begin to work. Mma Makutsi takes over management of the garage and the useless young apprentices, making the apprentices accountable for their work, and making rapid business decisions to make good on the garage's name, Speedy Motors. She shows her strong management skills from the first hour of taking over her role as acting manager. The young apprentices are impressed with her, and how she applies her detective skills to solving some of the auto problems that the apprentices cannot solve.

An important Government Man, never named, approaches Mma Ramotswe to investigate his sister-in-law, whom he suspects of attempting to poison his brother. Mma Makutsi devises a way to gain access to the family, so the case is accepted, despite Mma Ramotswe needing time for her fiancé and their foster children. Mma Ramotswe is invited to stay at the family farm, so she can meet the family and investigate. While she is away, Mma Makutsi gains a client for the detective agency who wants work done in three days. Mr Pulani runs the beauty contests in Gaborone. The present contest for Miss Beauty and Integrity has five finalists; one is disqualified for theft from a store. The final selection is in three days. He wants to know if there is one finalist who has integrity. He is already under pressure from his financial backers for scandals the year before. He promises a large fee, writing the check as soon as Mma Makutsi agrees to take the case. She travels to the university campus where one contestant lives, under her guise as a news reporter come to interview each contestant. The girl reveals herself to be shallow, a "bad girl". One of the apprentices drives her to meet the girls; Mma Makutsi realizes that any girls he knows will not be suitable to win the contest. He knows three of the four girls from his bar visits. Mma Makutsi then proceeds to the home of the fourth girl. She proves to be beautiful and modest, and her goal is to attend the Botswana Secretarial College, the same as Mma Makutsi attended. Returning to the office, she reports to the client with confidence that she is the contestant who matches the title of the contest.

At the farm, Mma Ramotswe meets all the family of the Government Man and a few of the staff in the house. She joins the family for a lunch that includes a meat stew. She is poisoned by this meal, as are several others in the family. She recovers and sleeps, waking well before dawn. Walking about the grounds, she encounters the cook, who is starting the fire in the house boiler. He once had worked in Gaborone as an assistant chef, but really did not like the work. He met the Government Man, who suggested he go to the family farm to be the assistant manager, as that was the work he sought, care of the cattle. Arriving at the farm, the brother took him on as the chef based on his experience. The cook had no success in making his case for a different job, so he began cooking badly in hopes they would push him out of that job. Mma Ramotswe decides not to prosecute the cook for the risks he had taken. Back in Gaborone she confronts the Government Man with all the misunderstandings and hurt feelings of each person in that family, the real poison being so many secrets and unexpressed feelings. All of this is out in the open now and the cook is put to a different job. She then goes to see her fiancé at the orphan farm, where he has been connecting with the wild boy, teaching him words, making him toys. The two reach a vantage point above Mochudi, to see how the rains change the landscape. He is getting better.

== Characters ==
- Mma Precious Ramotswe: Owner of the No. 1 Ladies' Detective Agency in Gaborone, Botswana. She is self-taught as a detective, and generally successful in resolving the cases brought to her. In her youth, she married a musician who was cruel to her. She had a baby who died soon after birth, and learned she could have no more children. She is in her thirties. She is engaged to marry Mr JLB Matekoni. She drives a tiny white van which she has had for 11 years.
- Obed Ramotswe: Late father of Precious, who was a strong and wise man. She loves him dearly and often thinks of him as she solves her cases, and as she decides to become engaged to Mr JLB Matekoni and accept the orphans he took in. He left her a herd of 2,000 cattle; she sold most of them to start her business. She kept about 60, which a cousin watches for her.
- Mr JLB Matekoni: Owner of Tlokweng Road Speedy Motors garage, and possibly the best mechanic in Botswana. He is a very kind man, in his forties. He has depression when this novel opens.
- Mma Grace Makutsi: She is the secretary to Mma Ramotswe, very efficient, known for scoring 97 on her final exam at the secretarial college. She wears large glasses. She is caring for one of her brothers, dying from disease. She is in her twenties. She has been given the title of assistant detective, and acting assistant manager at the garage.
- Richard: Brother of Mma Makutsi, who now lives with her in her rented room on the Lobatse Road. He is very ill, with a terminal illness.
- Mma Silvia Potokwani: Matron of the orphan farm outside Gaborone. She is a most persuasive woman, in seeking help for her orphans and keeping the place running. She finds a quiet place for Mr JLB Matekoni to recuperate.
- Motholeli: Thirteen-year-old girl taken as foster child by Mr JLB Matekoni. Her mother died when she was 7. The custom of her people was to bury a newborn still nursing with the mother, if the mother died for any reason. Motholeli recovered her brother from the shallow grave and headed for the road, where a kind couple picked her up. She and the baby were in hospital, as Motholeli had tuberculosis and the boy needed care. Recovered from the worst of it, the two are taken home by a woman at the hospital. She has a recurrence of TB that leaves her unable to walk, and she uses a wheelchair. When that family must relocate for the husband's job, she and her young brother are placed at the orphan farm, and then taken as foster children by Mr JLB Matekoni. She writes her own story for school, saying she has had three lives.
- Puso: Five years younger brother of Motholeli. He is a lively boy, well-behaved like his sister, who has been caring for him since his birth. He and his sister are of the Basarwa people of Gaborone, hunter-gatherers who live in the bush. Both are foster children to Mr JLB Matekoni, and cared for by Mma Ramotswe in this first month away from the orphan farm.
- Rose: Maid to Mma Ramotswe. She is a conscientious and reliable woman who has worked for Mma Ramotswe since she bought the house on Zebra Drive. She aids in the care of the foster children, and has children of her own.
- Big Government Man: He seeks the aid of the No. 1 Ladies Detective Agency, to learn who is poisoning his younger brother. His name is never stated, but his appearances in the newspapers and power in government are described.
- Dr Moffat: Diagnoses and treats Mr JLB Matekoni for depression, which he says is a common disease, and he has good medicines to treat him.
- Family of the big government man: His father, mother, brother and sister-in-law live in the main family home on their cattle farm.
- Samuel the cook: Man who sought work on the farm, but was assigned to be the cook instead, and who dislikes being cook, regardless of his talents.
- Useless young apprentices: Two young men offered the opportunity to learn the art of car mechanic at Speedy Motors. Both are young, about 19, and their main interest is meeting girls in bars.
- Mataila: Boy of 5 or 6 years, brought to the orphan farm wearing no clothes, having no words, not knowing his name. Mma Potokwane gave him a name, and tries to reach him. He bites, like a wild boy, and the first people who found him said he smelled like a lion. Mma Ramotswe meets him early on, and Mr JLB Matekoni connects with him toward the end of the novel.
- Mr Moemedi “Two Shots” Pulani: Businessman of Gaborone who loves to look at beautiful women, and runs beauty contests in Botswana. He seeks help from the Detective Agency, because one of the five finalists for Miss Beauty and Integrity has been caught stealing.
- Motlamedi: Finalist in the Miss Beauty and Integrity contest who is attending university, but is a "good time girl" known to the garage apprentice, and in Mma Makutsi's view, a "bad girl".
- Patricia: Finalist in the Miss Beauty and Integrity contest who lives in Tlokweng with her mother. She hopes to attend the Botswana Secretarial College. Mma Makutsi judges her as having integrity.

== Reviews ==
All of the first three books in this series are reviewed in one article by Alida Becker. Regarding the main character with her "appealing personality," she says, "As she pursues her investigations . . . Mma Ramotswe acts as much like Miss Manners as Miss Marple." Once the reader has read the first two novels and is "in the third, Morality for Beautiful Girls, you've realized that all this activity is much less about whodunit than why." The novels are also "about the variety and resilience of a nation to which Smith seems utterly devoted." The writing has both "energy and eccentricity", though "occasional longeurs of Smith's prose, whose formal cadences can sometimes slide into a languid drone" also mark the prose. As an example of the charm of Mma Ramotswe, this extract from Morality of Beautiful Girls is described: "Listening to a BBC broadcast about philosophers, for example, she is startled, then amused, by a description that sounds very much like her selfish, abusive ex-husband: She had been married to an existentialist herself, without even knowing it."

In an article reviewing the first three novels of this series, Dick Lochte remarks on the events of Morality for Beautiful Girls as "thoroughly engaging and entertaining". The detective, Mma Ramotswe is "a remarkably original character". McCall Smith's writing style is "seemingly simple and direct, but this is a deception. Precious' progress is charted in passages that have the power to amuse or shock or touch the heart, sometimes all at once."

Sandy Bauers reviews the audio versions of the first four novels (The No. 1 Ladies Detective Agency, Tears of the Giraffe, Morality for Beautiful Girls and The Kalahari Typing School for Men), which were released in 2003 in the US. The stories are "gentle mysteries, and Precious solves them all cleverly and easily, mostly through a finely honed sense of human frailty and simple wisdom." The key aspect of these mysteries is not in the crimes themselves, rather "in the way she [Mma Ramotswe] does it, and the way the characters interact." The reader for the audio versions is Lisette Lecat, who is familiar with Botswana's speech patterns in English. The reviewer feels that "books that require accents from other countries" are where the genre of audio books shines.

== Part of series ==
This novel is the third in a series based on a set of characters residing in Botswana. The story opens about a month after the close of the prior novel, Tears of the Giraffe. The characters have aged and developed since the first novel, and more cases are brought to the No. 1 Ladies Detective Agency to be solved in each novel. This novel has a balance between two cases and the personal lives of the main characters. There is a theme of morality, as Mma Ramotswe and Mma Makutsi each spend time reflecting on moral behavior in the new nation, the differences in how men and women are treated, their strength from the old Setswana morality, and how people in the country change to meet the new situations of Botswana.

== Publication history ==
Per Kirkus Reviews, the early novels in this series had their American publication later than in Scotland, part of the UK, which published the first in 1998, the second in 2000, and the third, Morality for Beautiful Girls, in 2001. The first three novels appeared in 2002 in the USA. In their review of the first novel in the series, Kirkus Reviews notes that "The first American publication of this 1999 debut has been preceded by two special Booker citations and two sequels, Tears of the Giraffe (2000) and Morality for Beautiful Girls (2001), both forthcoming in the series."

In reviewing the fifth novel in the series, Marcel Berlins describes the pathway of the growing audience, requiring one to understand that although Scotland and England are part of the same nation, the residents are not reading the same books at the same time. There was an interesting pathway for knowledge and appreciation of the series by McCall Smith, a Scot, featuring Precious Ramotswe, the female detective in Botswana, to reach England. Marcel Berlins notes in his review of The Full Cupboard of Life that it is the fifth in a series, but the first to be readily available in England, via the success of the series in America. "This novel by an eminent Scottish law professor about a woman detective in Botswana is the fifth in a series, the other four having largely escaped English attention (and availability). The Scots have had better luck: they've known about McCall Smith for several years, but it has taken his extraordinary and unexpected success in the US for word to have filtered back to England that he's a treasure of a writer whose books deserve immediate devouring."

In an item from the Wisconsin Public Radio program, To the Best of Our Knowledge, the first novel "The No. 1 Ladies' Detective Agency, was a surprise hit [in Scotland], receiving two special Booker citations and a place on the Times Literary Supplement's International Books of the Year and the Millennium list." The success in Scotland and the favorable critical notice did not speed publishers to release it in the USA. "American publishers were slow to take an interest, and by the time The No. 1 Ladies' Detective Agency was picked up by Pantheon Books, Smith had already written two sequels. The books went from underground hits to national phenomena in the United States, spawning fan clubs and inspiring celebratory reviews."
