= In the Company of Cheerful Ladies =

2004 novel by Alexander McCall Smith

- First edition cover, Polygon Press
- Author: Alexander McCall Smith
- Cover artist: Design: Barrie Tullett & James Hutcheson; photo: Sandy Grant
- Language: English
- Series: The No. 1 Ladies' Detective Agency series
- Genre: Detective, Mystery novel
- Publisher: Polygon Books
- Publication date: 2004
- Publication place: Scotland
- Media type: Print (Hardback & Paperback), Audio (Cassette & CD)
- Pages: 231 hardback
- ISBN: 1-904598-06-4
- OCLC: 56356719
- Preceded by: The Full Cupboard of Life (2004)
- Followed by: Blue Shoes and Happiness (2006)

In the Company of Cheerful Ladies is the sixth in The No. 1 Ladies' Detective Agency series of novels by Alexander McCall Smith, set in Gaborone, Botswana, and featuring the Motswana protagonist Precious Ramotswe.

Work and personal worries, and the reappearance of her cruel first husband, threaten the happiness of Mma Ramotswe and her new husband Mr JLB Matekoni. Her assistant, Mma Makutsi, and a new employee to whom Mma Ramotswe has been kind, are determined to repay their debt of gratitude by helping her in their turn. With diligent detective work, her problems are overcome. Mma Makutsi herself finds love at last.

The author received recognition for this series in 2004 with the Dagger in the Library from the Crime Writers Association and Author of the Year from British Book Awards. This novel received mixed reviews. One newspaper found the writing to create "an utter and truthful sense of place, of belonging" while another found the story lacking in interest. The first printing was 101,000, compared to 2,000 or fewer for the earlier novels, in response to the interest in the United States and in England. Sales of all books in the series, in English, exceeded five million.

== Plot summary ==
Mma Ramotswe and her new husband settle down to married life with their foster-children, but problems are piling up. The tenant of Mr JLB Matekoni's house is running an illegal drinking den. Then Charlie, the apprentice, gets entangled with a wealthy married woman. Mma Ramotswe accidentally knocks a man off his bicycle with her van, as she sees Charlie entering the expensive car driven by a wealthy woman. Mr Polopetsi was not injured, but Mma Ramotswe learns his story; he has been unemployed following a spell in prison after what appears to have been a miscarriage of justice. She gets his bike fixed by the apprentice and then Mma Ramotswe persuades her husband to employ him out of guilt and sympathy. He proves an asset to the garage and to the detective service. Mma Ramotswe's violent ex-husband Note Mokote reappears and demands money from her.

Mma Ramotswe is shaken deeply as she realizes she never got a divorce from Mokote years ago, threatening her new marriage. Check in hand, she drives to his mother's home to deliver it. Note is not there. His mother tells her that Note was married to another woman at the time of her marriage to Note, and had a child with that wife. This takes the weight off Mma Ramotswe, as she realizes he was the bigamist, and they were never legally married. When he appears at her office, she faces him herself, no longer shaking in fear at his violence, with two decent men in her life waiting in the background as the conversation proceeds.

Mma Makutsi's love prospects improve when she starts dancing lessons and is partnered with another student, Phuti Radiphuti. At first she tries to avoid him, as he is awkward and stammers, but he turns out to be a kind and gentle man and a romance begins. She removes some of Mma Ramotswe's burden of worry by solving an important fraud investigation on her own, and manoeuvring Charlie back to work. Mr Radiphuti's father knows Precious Ramotswe from the time when her father was still alive. He enlists the help of Mma Ramotswe to put a proposal of marriage from his shy son to Grace Makutsi, and the two become engaged.

== Characters ==
- Mma Precious Ramotswe: Owner of the No. 1 Ladies' Detective Agency in Gaborone, Botswana. She is self taught as a detective, and generally successful in resolving the cases brought to her. In her youth, she married a musician who was cruel to her, who appears again in her life. She had a baby who died soon after birth, and learned she could have no more children. She recently married Mr JLB Matekoni and they live together in her home on Zebra Drive. She drives a tiny white van, which she has had for all the time she has been in Gaborone and loves dearly.
- Obed Ramotswe: Late father of Precious, who was a strong and wise man. She loves him dearly and often thinks of him as she solves her cases.
- Mr JLB Matekoni: Owner of Tlokweng Road Speedy Motors garage, and possibly the best mechanic in Botswana. He is a very kind man, in his forties, newly married to Mma Ramotswe.
- Mma Grace Makutsi: She is the secretary to Mma Ramotswe, very efficient, known for scoring 97 on her final exam at the secretarial college. She wears large glasses. She is one of a large family. She has good insight into many situations, but lacks the ease in viewing life that marks her employer. She is in her twenties.
- Mma Silvia Potokwani: Matron of the orphan farm outside Gaborone. She is a most persuasive woman, in seeking help for her orphans and keeping the place running, especially from Mr JLB Matekoni. She tells Mma Ramotswe that Note has been seen in Gaborone.
- Motholeli: Foster child of Mr JLB Matekoni, from the orphan farm. She needs a wheelchair to get about. Friends take turns rolling her to and from the stop for the school bus. She worries that she and her brother might be sent back to the orphan farm when she sees Mma Ramotswe upset.
- Puso: Five years younger brother of Motholeli. He is a lively boy, well-behaved like his sister, who has been caring for him since his birth. He and his sister are of the Basarwa people of Gaborone, hunter-gatherers who live in the bush.
- Note Mokote: Trumpet player who married Precious Ramotswe when she was quite young. He was violent with her. They had a child who died the day she was born. In this story Precious learns he was married already, so he was a bigamist, and she had no legal marriage with him, no need for a divorce now.
- Mr Polopetsi: Cyclist met by Mma Ramotswe near her husband's now-rented home. He has a family but cannot get a job due to an unfair stint in prison from his years working as an assistant pharmacist in a hospital. Mma Ramotswe feels he will be a good employee and persuades her husband to take him on. He proves his worth in the garage and in detective work to find Mma Ramotswe's little white van.
- Phuti Radiphuti: Gentleman who joins a dance class which Grace Makutsi also joins. They become friends and he wants to marry her, but is too shy to ask. He manages his father's furniture store. His shyness is marked by a stammer in his speech.
- Mr Radiphuti: Father of Phuti, owner of the furniture store and a lifelong friend of Obed Ramotswe. He seeks to aid his shy son with Grace Makutsi, confident he and Precious can work it out.
- Violet Sephotho: Low scoring student at the Secretarial College when Grace Makutsi attended it. She too is in the dance class, the first time the two meet since college. She offers negative comments to Grace at the dance. Violet is attractive and dances with a handsome man who is a graceful dancer. Grace handles the negative remarks with aplomb, thus ending the remarks for now.
- Charlie: One of two apprentices in the garage. He takes up with a wealthy married woman and then quits the garage in anger. He becomes a case for Mma Ramotswe and Mma Makutsi to investigate.

== Literary significance and reception ==
The critical reception of this novel was mixed. The Scotsman stated that "McCall Smith’s beautiful evocation of life in Botswana offers sagacity, charm and a feeling of fable, combined with an utter and truthful sense of place, of belonging. The Sunday Times found the story "lacking in narrative drive" and concluded that "...some readers may wish to escape to somewhere a little more invigorating".

In 2004, the year of the novel's publication, Alexander McCall Smith won the Author of the Year award at the British Book Awards and the Crime Writers' Association Dagger in the Library award, both for the No. 1 Ladies' Detective Agency series.

== Publication history ==
This was the first of the No. 1 Ladies' Detective Agency novels to be printed in hardback, with a very large initial print run of 101,000 copies to meet the anticipated demand, as sales in English of the series to date exceeded five million.
