= The Good Husband of Zebra Drive =

Novel by Alexander McCall Smith

- First edition
- Author: Alexander McCall Smith
- Language: English
- Series: The No. 1 Ladies' Detective Agency series
- Genre: Detective, Mystery novel
- Publisher: Polygon Books
- Publication date: 2007
- Publication place: Scotland
- Media type: Print (Hardback & Paperback), Audio (Cassette & CD)
- Pages: 224
- ISBN: 978-1-904598-98-5
- OCLC: 74525925
- Preceded by: Blue Shoes and Happiness
- Followed by: The Miracle at Speedy Motors

The Good Husband of Zebra Drive is the eighth in The No. 1 Ladies' Detective Agency series of novels by Alexander McCall Smith, set in Gaborone, Botswana, and featuring the Motswana protagonist Precious Ramotswe.

Grace Makutsi is promoted to associate detective and handles a case herself. Mma Ramotswe helps the hospital in Mochudi deal with a string of mysterious patient deaths. Her husband wants to try his hand at detection, and with his usual style, he does. Charlie, the apprentice, decides to quit and run a taxi service.

This novel was well received by several reviewers. One felt this novel to be a bit repetitious. Others found the "outpouring of mercy" to shed new light on the characters, "tidbits of quiet wisdom sprinkled throughout" the novel are a major part of the novel's appeal, and that this novel, like the earlier ones, "resonate[s] with poignancy, wisdom, and wit". The novel entered the US best-seller list, from Publishers Weekly.

== Plot summary ==
Mma Ramotswe meets her second cousin, who comes to the No. 1 Ladies’ Detective Agency for help. Tati Monyena works for the hospital in Mochudi, where a series of three deaths in the same bed in the intensive care unit, at the same time, on the same day of the week has caused concern. While she is in Mochudi interviewing staff, her assistant takes the afternoon off, and a client arrives. Mr JLB Matekoni, first class mechanic who shares offices with the Detective Agency, meets the client, Mma Faith Botumile, who believes her husband is cheating on her. Matekoni wants to handle the case himself. His wife, Mma Ramotswe, agrees to this after careful thought, balancing the role of women in her agency and the importance of her husband. Mma Grace Makutsi, assistant in the Detective Agency, is engaged to a wealthy man, and her life is changing. One of the apprentices in the garage, Charlie, has an idea to run his own taxi service, with a used Mercedes Benz car he will buy on time from his boss, Mr JLB Matekoni, so he gives his notice. Discussions in the office get tense, as Mma Ramotswe discussed the absence of Grace Makutsi during office hours, to go shopping. Grace abruptly quits and goes home.

The next day, Grace Makutsi seeks a new job, having the name of an employment agency in hand. She is startled to meet her nemesis, Violet Sephotho, as the “head hunter” looking to fill positions for experienced secretaries. There is no chance of a good position from her sarcastic, one-time classmate, which gives Grace Makutsi a moment to realize how much she likes her work at the Detective Agency. She takes a cab there, arriving mid-morning. Mma Ramotswe is glad to see her back again. She promotes her to associate detective, meaning she can handle a case from first interview through to the end. The next day, a client will be arriving while Mma Ramotswe will be in Mochudi to make progress on the hospital's case. Grace Makutsi meets Teenie Magama, who knows an employee is stealing from her printing business, and needs proof. That evening, Phuti Radiphuti gives Grace an engagement ring, a diamond from Botswana. He is pleased that Grace did not get another job, as he knows how much Mma Ramotswe relies on her.

Charlie's taxi service starts when he picks up a customer before he has his permit. He is distracted looking at her in the rear view mirror and drives through a red light into a truck; although no one is injured, his car is ruined, and he resumes his apprenticeship. While Charlie is away, Mr JLB Matekoni follows Rra Botumile from his office twice, to find the woman he is seeing. The first time he witnesses him speaking with Charlie Horzo, the bad guy of Gaborone, about financial events that will cause the stock to fall in his employer's company in about two weeks. The second time, he brings a camera with him, and takes a picture when Rra Botumile meets a woman at a house. When he brings the photo to Mma Botumile, a sharp-edged woman, her husband comes home, to see that the photo is of his co-worker. He had been following the wrong man, not the husband. He reveals a strong side, telling Mma Botumile not to insult him, sticking to business. He reveals the conversation he overheard, which Ra Botumile understands: his colleague has been giving out private company information, a serious breach of the law.

At the hospital, Mma Ramotswe meets with Dr Cronje, who feels these deaths were all of natural causes. Their conversation is tender, as she senses his feeling of belonging nowhere as a biracial man, in contrast to her knowing exactly where she fits in life, in Africa. She then speaks to the cleaner, who uses a very long extension cord to clean the area where the deaths occurred. This woman recently changed her procedure; she had been unplugging a machine so she could plug in the floor polisher she operated. This is the explanation for the deaths, which Tati Monyena learned, and then directed her never to use the outlets in that room. The woman did not know the effect of her prior procedure and needs her job. They resolve this delicate situation without putting the blame on her, the lowest level staff.

Grace Makutsi visits the printing company, where her undercover as a customer is quickly blown. With a notion from Mma Potokwane at the orphan farm, giving responsibility to a boy who was stealing, Grace Makutsi suggests a similar ploy for the employee suspected of the thefts, on her second visit. It does not work quite as well, as he steals all supplies on hand and disappears. There is no need to fire him.

== Characters ==
- Mma Precious Ramotswe: Owner of the No. 1 Ladies' Detective Agency in Gaborone, Botswana, now in her early 40s. She is self taught as a detective, and generally successful in resolving the cases brought to her. In her youth, she married a musician who was cruel to her. She had a baby who died soon after birth, and learned she could have no more children. She is married to Mr JLB Matekoni. She drives a tiny white van which she has had for many years. She is a woman of "traditional build" and one who values the traditions of her people even as her country changes so much.
- Obed Ramotswe: Late father of Precious, who was a strong and wise man. She loves him dearly and often thinks of him.
- Mr JLB Matekoni: Owner of Tlokweng Road Speedy Motors garage, and possibly the best mechanic in Botswana. He is the husband of Mma Ramotswe and foster parent of the two children. He has an itch to try solving a case, and his wife agrees.
- Mma Grace Makutsi: She is the secretary to Mma Ramotswe, very efficient, known for scoring 97 on her final exam at the secretarial college. She wears large glasses. She struggled to reach her current position as the associate detective. She has good insight into many situations, but lacks the ease in viewing life that marks her employer. She is engaged to marry Phuti Radiphuti. She is in her early 30s.
- Mr Polopetsi: Man hired by Mma Ramotswe to help out in the garage and occasionally help the detective agency as well. Mma Ramostwe agrees to be godmother to his son, as his first godmother has died (is late).
- Phuti Radiphuti: He is the owner of a furniture company and of some cattle, who is engaged to Grace Makutsi. They met at dance classes.
- Mma Silvia Potokwani: Matron of the orphan farm outside Gaborone. She is a most persuasive woman, in seeking help for her orphans and keeping the place running. She is friends with both Mr JLB Matekoni and Mma Ramotswe.
- Motholeli: Foster daughter to Mr JLB Matekoni, confined to a wheel chair by earlier disease. She would like to know as much about engines as her foster father.
- Puso: Five years younger brother of Motholeli. He is a lively boy, well-behaved like his sister, who has been caring for him since his birth. He and his sister are of the Basarwa people of Gaborone, hunter-gatherers who live in the bush.
- Violet Sephotho: Low scoring but attractive student at the Secretarial College when Grace Makutsi attended it. She runs an employment agency in Gaborone to place trained secretaries.
- Charlie: One of two apprentices in the garage. He is 20 years old. He decides to buy an old Mercedes Benz car from his boss, to open his own cab business, briefly.
- Mma Teenie Magama: Owner of the Good Impression Printing Company who hires the Detective Agency to find which employee is stealing supplies from her company. This is the first case that Grace Makutsi handles herself, as associate detective.
- Tati Monyena: A cousin of Mma Ramotswe who is now associate administrator at the hospital in Mochudi. He hires the Detective Agency to resolve a situation of unexpected patient deaths, an unusual case for her.
- Dr Cronje: Doctor at the Mochudi hospital who was on the internal committee to review the deaths. He is half Xhosa and half Afrikaner from neighboring South Africa, and feels like nowhere is home for him. Mma Ramotswe shares her wisdom and kindness with him as her investigation proceeds.
- Faith Botumile: Woman who suspects her husband is cheating on her. She is met first by Mr JLB Matekoni, as the ladies are both out. He pursues this case.

== Reviews ==
Kirkus Reviews is impressed by the resolution of a case solved by Mma Ramotswe, as the "outpouring of mercy it provokes casts a welcome new light on Smith’s beloved Botswana, where everyone is honest and polite, except for the ones who aren’t." Mma Ramotswe's husband, Mr JLB Matekoni, a first-class mechanic by profession, takes on one case, and shows "some deductions worthy of Sherlock Holmes in support of his status" as a first-time detective. A review by Barnes & Noble offers a similar positive view of this novel: "Part of the widespread appeal of this series lies in the tidbits of quiet wisdom sprinkled throughout each delightfully meandering narrative. The Good Husband of Zebra Drive, for example, explores the importance of not only trust and mercy but also tolerance. Ramotswe's musings are as insightful as they are understated: "It's interesting how we can look at things and think we see something, when it really isn't there at all." Entertaining and enlightening, Smith's beloved No. 1 Ladies' Detective Agency saga is simply precious."

The Booklist Review says that this series "continue[s] to resonate with poignancy, wisdom, and wit" and considers this series to be McCall Smith's "love letter to a country whose salubrious climate is matched by the warmth and humanity of its people."

Publishers Weekly reviewed the audio book issued at the same time as the hardcover, narrated by Lisette Lecat. It finds the series, in this novel, to be "a bit repetitious", while there is high praise for Lecat's work, saying that she "doesn't simply portray the characters", but that "she is Mma Ramotswe," and "Lecat is also Ramotswe's husband, Mr JLB Matekoni," and so on for each regular character. In this novel, "She does especially well with a rude, shrill client who thinks her husband is cheating on her."

This novel was listed as a national best seller (USA), entering the list at number 3 from Publishers Weekly, in the Chicago Tribune.
