= The Limpopo Academy of Private Detection =

2012 novel by Alexander McCall Smith

- First edition
- Author: Alexander McCall Smith
- Language: English
- Series: The No. 1 Ladies' Detective Agency series
- Genre: Mystery
- Publisher: Little, Brown
- Publication date: April 3, 2012
- Publication place: United Kingdom
- Media type: Print (Hardback and e-book)
- Pages: 261
- ISBN: 978-1408702604
- Preceded by: The Saturday Big Tent Wedding Party
- Followed by: The Minor Adjustment Beauty Salon

The Limpopo Academy of Private Detection is the thirteenth mystery novel by Alexander McCall Smith in The No. 1 Ladies' Detective Agency series, first published in 2012. The story is set primarily in Gaborone, with Motswana Precious Ramotswe as the main detective.

In this novel, Precious Ramotswe is faced with serious problems among two who are very close to her, Mma Potokwane of the orphan farm and young Fanwell, assistant mechanic in her husband's garage. Besides help from her assistant, Mma Makutsi, both are aided by none other than the author of their well-used handbook on private detection, Clovis Andersen, visiting from America. The Limpopo River marks one border of Botswana and runs near Gaborone; Grace Makutsi suggests that as a name for an academy of private detection when Andersen is their guest for dinner.

Reception was generally positive, focussing on the interplay between Mma Ramotswe and the American with his concise summaries of any situation, as well as the moral clarity of the world described by McCall Smith. It was on the New York Times fiction best seller list in 2012.

== Plot ==
Precious Ramotswe is pressed by troubles of two people close to her. Mma Silvia Potokwane, who heads the orphan farm and Fanwell, the younger of the two assistant mechanics, both need help. The weight of serious problems for these friends seems to limit the ideas from her usually prolific mind. Then a stranger from America appears at her office to say hello, none other than Clovis Andersen, the author of the book on which she and Mma Makutsi rely for good advice. Recently widowed, he is in the country to visit a friend who is setting up public libraries in Botswana. Mma Makutsi is married to Phuti Radiphuti, and Phuti is watching the progress of the new house being built for them.

Mma Potokwane is dismissed from her position at the orphan farm by the board, which has decided to build a central cafeteria in place of meals cooked and served at the homes by the housemothers. She and the housemothers feel this new building will ruin the children's lives, allowing no time together over meals. Mma Potokwane sees no way around this dismissal and tries to move on with her life. Clovis Andersen suggests they follow the money, that is, learn who is to gain by getting the contract to build this unwanted cafeteria. Then Fanwell agrees to repair a vehicle for a friend, which the friend claims he bought from someone and plans to sell it on. The friend is dealing in stolen vehicles, and the police arrest both of them. This arrest shakes Fanwell to his core. The garage and the detective agency are upset. He did not know it was a stolen vehicle until the police told him it was. Mr J L B Matekoni finds a lawyer for his assistant, but the lawyer proves to be incompetent, which is humorous except when Fanwell is relying on him.

Mma Ramotswe persuades Mma Potokwane to return to town from her lands, after a harrowing journey on a track that mires her little white van in sand enough to cover the tires. She has some ideas forming after speaking with the board member who wants this cafeteria built, Mr Ditso Ditso. He allows the visit rapidly as he fears he is being investigated by the government. He relaxes when he realizes that Mma Ramotswe and Clovis Andersen are there to discuss Mma Potokwane. He gets tense again when the topic of the building is brought up. Andersen notices these changes in his behavior, concluding that the man has something to hide. On the day Fanwell appears in magistrate court, Charlie, the other assistant, communicates by signs to the other defendant, who abruptly changes his plea from not guilty to guilty, and states clearly that Fanwell had no knowledge that the vehicle was stolen. Fanwell is free.

Returning to Mma Potokwane's situation, they visit the secretary who serves both Mma Potokwane and the board, pressing her to show them the documents for the proposed cafeteria. They learn that multiple bids were submitted, competitive in price, but that the contract was given to a different firm, at a price 50% higher than the bids. The contractor is the brother of Violet Sephoto. Mma Makutsi joins the other two detectives to visit Mma Soleti (Nails) at her salon, where the owner knows that Violet is the mistress of Mr Ditso Ditso. The three proceed to visit him a second time. Andersen notes that he is not on strong ground giving an overpriced contract to the brother of his mistress. Mma Ramotswe makes it clear what Ditso must do: resign from the board, cancel the contract for the construction, make a donation to the orphan farm and cancel the dismissal of Mma Potokwane. Mma Ramotswe is regaining her insightful ways with people as this case comes to its denouement. Andersen visits Grace and Phuti for dinner, where in conversation the idea of an academy for private detection, with Andersen as the teacher, is proposed. Phuti speaks with a worker at their house under construction to learn that the contractor was using bricks paid for by Phuti, on his own new house; the worker gives him a guide on how to recoup his money. Andersen then visits Mma Ramotswe to learn the plants in her garden. She now offers help to him, in his sorrow at the loss of his wife. She does not accept his self description as a nobody, who printed those books himself, selling few. She talks of the importance of remembering the late people in one's life and keeping in mind that they would want you to be happy, keep living. He is ready to return to Muncie, Indiana.

== Characters ==
- Mma Precious Ramotswe: Owner of the No. 1 Ladies' Detective Agency in Gaborone, Botswana, now in her 40s. She is self taught as a detective, and generally successful in resolving the cases brought to her. In her youth, she married a musician who was cruel to her. She had a baby who died soon after birth, and learned she could have no more children. She is married to Mr. J.L.B. Matekoni. She drives a tiny white van which she bought back after briefly using a newer van. She is a woman of "traditional build" and one who values the traditions of her people even as her country changes so much.
- Obed Ramotswe: Late father of Precious, who was a strong and wise man. She loves him dearly and often thinks of him.
- Mr. J.L.B. Matekoni: Owner of Tlokweng Road Speedy Motors garage, and possibly the best mechanic in Botswana. He is the husband of Mma Ramotswe; they were married at the end of the fifth novel, The Full Cupboard of Life. He is a good man.
- Motholeli: One of two foster children being raised by Mr. J.L.B. Matekoni and Mma Ramotswe. Due to early health problems she moves about in a wheelchair. She was introduced in Tears of the Giraffe.
- Puso: Five years younger brother of Motholeli. He is a lively boy. He and his sister are of the Basarwa people of Gaborone, hunter-gatherers who live in the bush. He was introduced in Tears of the Giraffe.
- Mma Grace Makutsi: She is now the secretary to Mma Ramotswe and an associate detective. She is very efficient, known for scoring 97 on her final exam at the secretarial college. She wears large glasses. She has good insight into many situations, but lacks the ease in viewing life that marks her employer. She married Phuti Radiphuti in the previous novel, The Saturday Big Tent Wedding Party. She is in her early 30s.
- Phuti Radiphuti: He is the owner of a furniture company and of some cattle, who is married to Grace Makutsi. He displays his competence in contracts in the supervision of the construction of their new home.
- Mma Silvia Potokwani: Matron of the orphan farm outside Gaborone. She is a most persuasive woman, in seeking help for her orphans and keeping the place running, who has perversely been dismissed. She is friends with both Mr J.L.B. Matekoni and Mma Ramotswe.
- Thomas: Carpenter who works on the house under construction for Grace and Phuti Radiphuti. He is from outside Botswana and speaks with Phuti one evening when Phuti first comes to inspect the progress on their home.
- Violet Sephotho: Low scoring but attractive student at the Secretarial College when Grace Makutsi attended it. She is Grace's nemesis, and now has left a bad reputation behind her from her generally self-centered actions. She is the mistress of a businessman in this story.
- Charlie: An apprentice in the garage. He is in his mid 20s. He chooses to help Fanwell in a risky way, and does not understand the risks of what he did.
- Fanwell: The younger of the two assistants, who has completed his apprenticeship. He is the sole support of his grandmother and younger siblings. He is quiet in his manner, not a risk-taker.
- Chobie: Friend of Fanwell, known to Charlie, who asks Fanwell to repair a car he has. He proves not much of a friend once both have been taken by the police for dealing in stolen merchandise.
- Mr Ditso Ditso: A businessman in Gaborone who joins the board that oversees the orphan farm. He is married.
- Clovis Andersen: Author of the book, The Principles of Private Detection, which has been the guide for Mma Ramotswe and Grace Makutsi from the start of the detective agency. He lives in Muncie, Indiana in the US, and comes to visit a friend working in Botswana after his wife dies. He then greets the only private detectives in Gaborone, startled to learn they read his book and know it by heart.
- Mr Putumelo: Builder of the new home for Grace and Phuti Radiphuti. He builds well, but he is having them pay for the bricks for his own new house, which Phuti learns before the final reckoning.
- Mma Soleti: She runs a beauty shop, the Minor Adjustment Beauty Salon, in Gaborone, which Mma Ramotwse visits because of the offer of a free consultation, and finds she and her half-sister know about Mr Ditso Ditso, as his wife and his "secret sweetheart" both visit the half-sister's nail salon.
- Mma Soleti (Nails): She runs a nail salon in Gaborone and half-sister to the other Mma Soleti. She provides the final evidence to stop Mr Ditso Ditso's involvement with the orphan farm.

== Reception ==
Critical reception for The Limpopo Academy of Private Detection has been mostly positive. The Guardian's Philip Womack wrote, "It is all but impossible to criticise this novel; that would be like kicking a slightly senile labrador that always retrieves a ball when you throw it, whether you like it or not." Publishers Weekly considers that this novel follows a pattern developed in earlier novels, and that "As always, the detection is secondary to Smith’s continuing exploration of the rhythms and social dynamics of smalltown African life." Kirkus Reviews adds that "Few fans, however, will want to miss the byplay between Mma Ramotswe and her revered mentor."

A review in The Scotsman notes that whenever Clovis Andersen "helps Mma Ramotswe, his principles for successful sleuthing deliver almost instantaneous results. . . because 'people will always give themselves away.'” The appeal is moral clarity: "these gentle stories of manners and morality have a clarity that is surely one of the reasons for their widespread appeal."

Mary Jane Smetanka wrote that the last few novels seemed boring with the same themes and main characters, but in this novel, she "was surprised to find new depths". Mma Ramotse's "musings on power, mortality and human frailty and foolishness seem more perceptive" and Grace Makutsi is "wrestling with guilt at her newfound status as the wife of a prosperous man". In sum, she says "The gentle and telling portrait of the human condition lingers".

This novel was on the New York Times hardcover fiction best seller list in 2012.
