= Blue Shoes and Happiness =

Crime novel by Alexander McCall Smith

- Cover of the first edition (Polygon)
- Author: Alexander McCall Smith
- Cover artist: Design: James Hutcheson; Illustrations: Iain McIntosh
- Language: English
- Series: The No. 1 Ladies' Detective Agency series
- Genre: Detective, Mystery novel
- Publisher: Polygon Books
- Publication date: 2006
- Publication place: Scotland
- Media type: Print (hard & paperback), audio (cassette & CD)
- Pages: 233 1st edition, hardback
- ISBN: 1-904598-63-3
- Preceded by: In the Company of Cheerful Ladies (2004)
- Followed by: The Good Husband of Zebra Drive (2007)

Blue Shoes and Happiness is the seventh in The No. 1 Ladies' Detective Agency series of novels by Alexander McCall Smith, set in Gaborone, Botswana, and featuring the Motswana protagonist Precious Ramotswe.

== Plot introduction ==
Mma Ramotswe, happy in her marriage and her work, contemplates happiness and what people need – or think they need – in order to achieve it. With the help of her staff at the detective agency, she tackles several mysteries involving people who have been behaving badly or dishonestly in order to get what they believe will make them happy.

== Plot summary ==
Mma Ramotswe is asked to investigate a cook who is being blackmailed, and a doctor whose nurse believes he is doing something illegal. She discovers the identity of the blackmailer, who is a newspaper agony aunt abusing the confidences of her correspondents, and forces her to stop. The doctor is selling generic drugs at the full cost to his patients, and she causes him to be reported. During the investigation she becomes more aware of her excess weight and its health risks and even tries to diet, but decides the most important thing is to be herself and happy.

Mr Polopetsi, the new employee, is happy in his work but still struggles with poverty and hostility from relatives due to his spell in prison. He wants to help Mma Ramotswe, his mentor, with detective work, and when superstitious fears disturb staff at the Mokolodi Nature Reserve, it is he who discovers the cause: an injured ground-hornbill, believed to bring ill luck. He removes it, but it dies, and he fears he has lost Mma Ramotswe's trust, but is relieved and grateful when she shows faith in him after all.

Mma Grace Makutsi fears her engagement to Phuti Radiphuti is over after a misunderstanding about feminism, but all is explained and, in the process, Mr J.L.B. Matekoni gains a comfortable new chair which will make him happy too. Grace begins to appreciate how her fortunes will change with her marriage, and indulges her passion for impractical shoes with a new blue pair, even though they do not fit very well.

== Reviews cited ==
- Williams, Tom (19 February 2006). "Joyful investigations". Crime fiction, The Observer. The Guardian. London.
- Lively, Penelope (19 March 2006). "Review". The Sunday Times. London. Archived from the original on 17 May 2011.
- Adair, Tom. "Review". The Scotsman. Archived from the original on 4 November 2007.
- Crace, John (27 February 2006). "Blue Shoes and Happiness by Alexander McCall Smith". The Guardian. London., a parody
