= The No. 1 Ladies' Detective Agency (novel) =

1998 detective novel

- First edition
- Author: Alexander McCall Smith
- Language: English
- Series: The No. 1 Ladies' Detective Agency series
- Genre: Detective, Mystery novel
- Publisher: Polygon Books
- Publication date: 1998
- Publication place: Scotland
- Media type: Print (Hardback & Paperback)
- Pages: 256
- ISBN: 0-7486-6252-9
- Followed by: Tears of the Giraffe (2000)

The No. 1 Ladies' Detective Agency is the first detective novel in the eponymous series by Scottish author Alexander McCall Smith, first published in 1998. The novel introduces the Motswana Mma Precious Ramotswe, who begins the first detective agency in Botswana, in the capital city Gaborone, after her beloved father dies. She hires a secretary and solves cases for her clients.

Precious tells her own story, from birth, and her father tells his story. When her father dies, she moves from Mochudi to Gaborone, the capital city, to begin her detective agency. She solves three cases, and meets important people, her secretary Grace Makutsi and good friend, the excellent mechanic, Mr JLB Matekoni.

The novel was first published in Scotland, where it gained a following. After two more novels in the series were published, all three were published in the US to much acclaim; in 2002, for example, Publishers Weekly called it a "little gem of a book". The series did not catch on in England until the fifth novel in the series.

== Plot summary ==
Mma Ramotswe sits in her office, the Number 1 Ladies Detective Agency. She has a secretary, and she has clients. She is in Gaborone, the capital of Botswana, a place of which she is proud.

She is the only child of Obed Ramotswe, a man who worked long years in the mines in South Africa, until one day he witnessed a crime, and knew he had to leave the mines. He had married a year or two earlier, and their daughter was born in Mochudi. He was wise with the money he earned in the mines, using it to buy cattle and slowly grow his herd, watched by a cousin while he was in the mines. Not long after he returned, his wife died. A cousin, left by her husband because she was barren, came to help him raise his daughter Precious. The cousin taught her well, caring for her until a second man asked her to marry him, when Precious is about 10 years old. Precious continues at school until she is 16. Her father wants her to pursue more education, but she wants to stop school and does. She itches to see new places.

She lives with her cousin and cousin's husband. He has a business running buses, and is doing well. She takes a job in the firm, and uncovers thievery by another employee, defrauding the company. Each weekend she takes a bus home to Mochudi to see her father. On one bus trip she meets a boy, a musician named Note Mokote. Soon he proposes marriage to her, going to her father for his permission. Precious is already pregnant at the marriage, but Note is not pleased at being a father. He beats his wife as part of his lovemaking, for any reason. Once she must see a doctor for treatment after a beating. On return home, he has left her. Her child lives only for five days. She heads back to Mochudi to be with her father until he dies from the lung disease he got in the mines, just after she is 34. Her father's herd is large, and the price was good. She sells some of the good herd of cattle to set up her office in Gaborone and buy a house there. The house is on Zebra Drive. The office is well-located. She hires Mma Makutsi from the Secretarial College and the first client appears directly.

== Characters ==
- Mma Precious Ramotswe: She starts the first detective agency in Botswana when she is 34. Prior to that time, she lived with her father, save for a brief and painful marriage to a musician. She describes herself as "traditionally built".
- Obed Ramotswe: Father of Precious Ramotswe, and wise breeder of cattle. He loves his daughter, focussing his life on her when his wife dies not long after he returns from the mines to live in Mochudi full time with her and their daughter. He dies at age 62, when his daughter is 34.
- The cousin: Woman, a cousin of Obed Ramotswe, who is left by her first husband because she cannot have children. She raises Precious until she is about 10 years old. Then, she is asked to marry a second time, to a man successful in his own business running buses in Botswana.
- Note Mokote: The musician who catches the eye of Precious after she has been living with the cousin near Gaborone, working in the husband's firm. Note is cruel to her, and leaves her pregnant after a few months of marriage.
- Mma Grace Makutsi: Hired as secretary to the detective agency based on the college's reference. She earned the highest score from the Secretarial College, at 97 percent. She wears large oval glasses.
- Mr JLB Matekoni: Auto mechanic with his own business, Tlokweng Road Speedy Motors. He has known Mma Ramotswe for years, as her father was friends with his uncle. The new detective agency is not far from his garage. He proposes marriage to her twice. He is ten years older than her.
- Happy Bapetsi: A client who never met her father is confronted by a man who claims that role, and her care of him.
- Mr Patel: Very rich retired businessman in Gaborone, a client with a 16-year-old daughter who worries him. he engages Mma Ramotswe to find what boy his daughter is meeting.
- Dr Maketsi: Doctor who treated Obed Ramotswe in his last illness, and later becomes her client with a problem he has with a doctor in the hospital.

== Quote ==
The novel's theme is summed up in this quote:

"She was a good detective, and a good woman. A good woman in a good country, one might say. She loved her country, Botswana, which is a place of peace, and she loved Africa, for all its trials. I am not ashamed to be called an African patriot, said Mma Ramotswe. I love all the people whom God made, but I especially know how to love the people who live in this place. They are my people, my brothers and sisters. It is my duty to help them to solve the mysteries in their lives. That is what I am called to do."

== Allusions to historical events, persons ==
Part of the novel's plot is based on the murder of Segametsi Mogomotsi in 1994, a ritual killing in Mochudi. The novel gives a happier ending to the story, as the kidnapped child is not murdered, and Mma Ramotswe rescues him.

== Reviews ==
This novel gained more reviews when the second and third novels were published in the US in 2002.

A reviewer in 2014 in The Guardian said "I really enjoyed this book, I found it thoroughly entertaining. Sometimes, while reading, I'd get so involved with the case Mma Ramotswe was solving that I wouldn't leave my chair until the case got over."

The Dallas Public Library review said of Precious Ramotswe: "Always optimistic and appreciative of her life in her beloved country, Mma has more than common insight into human foibles and is therefore able to tackle her cases not so much from evidence (of which there is some) but from the psychology of the people involved."

Publishers Weekly considered this a "little gem of a book" the pace desultory, which worked well, as "Mma Ramotswe's love of Africa, her wisdom and humor, shine through these pages as she shines her own light on the problems that vex her clients." The novel explores Botswana with a deft touch as well as telling the detective stories, "in a way that is both penetrating and light".

Kirkus Reviews was upbeat about the first novel, mentioning it with the next two in its review, and felt that the main character was ready for prime time. "Precious Ramotswe . . . she's ready for prime time. The first American publication of this 1999 debut has been preceded by two special Booker citations and two sequels, Tears of the Giraffe (2000) and Morality for Beautiful Girls (2001), both forthcoming in the series."

== Publication history ==
This novel was released in 1998 in Scotland. This novel and the next two in the series were released at one time in the US, in 2002.

== Film, television, and theatrical adaptations ==
=== Television ===
An adaptation for the screen The No. 1 Ladies' Detective Agency was made in 2007, directed by Anthony Minghella (who also co-wrote the screenplay), and scripted by Richard Curtis. A series of six programs for television was made jointly by the BBC, HBO and some other production companies. American singer and actress Jill Scott played the role of Mma Ramotswe. The first program was broadcast in the United Kingdom on BBC1 television on Easter Sunday 23 March 2008.

=== Stage ===
The novel was adapted as a musical which was performed in Cape Town, South Africa in fall 2015. The musical was written in conjunction with McCall Smith, and included a music score composed by Scotsman Tom Cunningham and Cape Town native Josh Hawks. Twelve specially created songs incorporate African dance, reggae, pioneer-style jazz and gentle ballads."
