= Tea Time for the Traditionally Built =

2009 novel by Alexander McCall Smith

- UK first edition
- Author: Alexander McCall Smith
- Language: English
- Series: The No. 1 Ladies' Detective Agency #10
- Genre: Detective, Mystery novel
- Published: 2009 Little, Brown
- Publication place: Scotland
- Media type: Print (Hardback & Paperback), Audio (CD)
- Preceded by: The Miracle at Speedy Motors
- Followed by: The Double Comfort Safari Club

Tea Time for the Traditionally Built, published in 2009, is the tenth in The No. 1 Ladies' Detective Agency series of novels by Alexander McCall Smith, set in Gaborone, Botswana, and featuring the Motswana protagonist Precious Ramotswe.

== Plot summary ==
Mma Ramotswe and her assistant Mma Makutsi agree that there are things that men know and ladies do not, and vice versa. The glamorous Violet Sephotho sets her sights on Mma Makutsi's unsuspecting fiancé and it becomes clear that some men do not know how to recognise a ruthless Jezebel even when she is bouncing up and down on the best bed in the Double Comfort Furniture Shop.

In her attempt to foster understanding between the sexes and find the traitor on Mr Football's team, Mma Ramotswe ventures into new territory, with the help of an observant small boy.

== Cases ==
Mma Ramotswe's newest client is the owner of the Kalahari Swoopers football club, but the lady detectives know little about football.

== Subplots ==
Mma Ramotswe's old white van is dying. She is not ready to give up on it. JLB gets her a new, but boring, van and as grateful as she is, she sets out to find her old van. But to make this complicated her van was stolen from the buyer, making it harder to find.

== Themes ==
This novel is concerned with themes of loyalty, relations between the sexes and often the need to dig deep to uncover the goodness of the human heart.
