= Ben Onwukwe =

British actor (born 1957)

- Born: Benjamin Neil Paddock Onwukw; 21 August 1957 (age 69); Brixton, London, England
- Occupation: Actor
- Years active: 1978–present
- Known for: Stuart "Recall" MacKenzie in London's Burning

Benjamin Neil Paddock Onwukwe (born 21 August 1957) is a British actor.

He is best known for playing Firefighter Stuart "Recall" MacKenzie from 1991 to 2002 in London's Burning, a dramatic television series first aired on the British television network ITV.

== Career ==
In addition to his most famous role in London's Burning, Onwukwe has frequently appeared on television in, among others, Waiting for God, Casualty, Bergerac, Holby City, The Bill, Inspector Morse, Coronation Street, Between the Lines, Delta Wave and the Netflix series Safe.

Onwukwe has also worked in various schools across the country, appeared in theatrical productions, recorded several radio plays and narrated audio books including Karen Jennings's An Island and Laura Shepherd-Robinson's Blood and Sugar.

He was also a member of the BBC's Radio Drama Company.

In 2019, he performed for the Royal Shakespeare Company at The Other Place in a new play by Robin French, Crooked Dances.

Onwukwe appears in the 2021 ITV drama series Professor T as the father of Detective Constable Lisa Donckers. His character is suffering, somewhat ironically, with a form of memory impairment, mistaking his daughter for his wife.

In 2022 he played Harley Joseph in Death in Paradise S11:E4.

In 2025 he played Red in the stage production of The Shawshank Redemption.
