= The Handsome Man's De Luxe Café =

Book by Alexander McCall Smith

- First edition cover
- Author: Alexander McCall Smith
- Language: English
- Series: The No. 1 Ladies' Detective Agency
- Genre: Mystery
- Set in: Botswana
- Publisher: Little, Brown
- Publication date: September 2014
- Publication place: United Kingdom
- Media type: Print
- Pages: 256
- ISBN: 978-1-408-70433-2
- Preceded by: The Minor Adjustment Beauty Salon
- Followed by: The Woman Who Walked in Sunshine

The Handsome Man's De Luxe Café is the fifteenth mystery novel by Alexander McCall Smith in the No 1 Ladies' Detective Agency series, first published in 2014. The novel features the Motswana protagonist Precious Ramotswe, commonly addressed as Mma Ramotswe throughout the series. Mma Ramotswe is based in Gaborone, Botswana and has set up the first and only detective agency in the country.

== Plot summary ==
Mma Makutsi has decided to start a new venture: The Handsome Man's De Luxe Café. She envisages this to be place for fashionable men to hobnob, and in her excitement ignores the various warning signs, even when alerted by her husband Phuti Radiphuti and her idol and boss Mma Ramotswe. To run the café, she ends up hiring her lawyer's family, all of whom have a track record of being unreliable. To make the matters worse, her nemesis Violet Sephotho, who is now a restaurant critic, spares no mean words in her review published in the leading national daily. Mma Potokwani helps by suggesting a complete change in the positioning and branding. She also offers to help run the café by offering one of her best housemothers as the manager.

The business of the Tlokweng Road Speedy Motors, run by Mr J L B Matekoni, is shrinking. To manage the finances, he fires his apprentice Charlie, who is visibly shaken by the change of events. Out of compassion, Mma Ramotswe hires him for the No.1 Ladies' Detective Agency.

An Indian family comes to meet Mma Ramotswe to find the identity of an Indian lady who apparently landed at their doorstep out of nowhere and cannot remember her identity. During the investigation, Mma Ramotswe discovers that the lady was harassed by her husband in South Africa and ran away. The husband managed to get police to charge her with attempt to murder. To protect her from her husband and from deportation, the family is giving her shelter and allowing her to feign amnesia. Mma Ramotswe is in a dilemma; if she writes the truth in her report, the lady will once again be at the mercy of her husband, and if she does not, she would be misleading the national authorities who are dependent on her report to decide the future course of action. Mma Ramotswe calls an old friend, who is now a senior police official in South Africa, to check the matter impartially and get the lady's name off the wanted list for murder, which resolves her problem.

== Characters ==
- Mma Precious Ramotswe: She is the proprietor of The Ladies' No. 1 Detective Agency.
- Obed Ramotswe: Late father of Mma Ramotswe, a wise man and a connoisseur of cattle.
- Mr J L B Matekoni: Mma Ramotswe's husband and the proprietor of the Tlokweng Road Speedy Motors.
- Charlie: One of the two employees of the Tlokweng Road Speedy Motors.
- Mma Grace Makutsi: She started as the secretary to Mma Ramotswe and is now the associate director of The No 1 Ladies' Detective Agency.
- Phuti Radiphuti: Owner of The Double Comfort Furniture Company and a large herd of cattle. He is married to Mma Makutsi.
- Clovis Andersen: American author of the Principles of Private Detection which is the reference book for Mma Ramotswe for almost all situations that she comes across in her profession.
- Mma Silvia Potokwani: Very resourceful, persuasive and well networked matron of the orphan farm close to Gaborone. She is a good friend of both Mma Ramotswe and Mr Matekoni.
- Charlie: Apprentice at the Tlokweng Road Speedy Motors for many years as he is more focused on girls than his career.
- Fanwell: A mechanic at the Tlokweng Road Speedy Motors
- Violet Sephotho: Mma Makutsi's ex classmate and nemesis.

== Reviews ==
This novel was well regarded as carrying forward the world of ideal philosophy, kindness and humor established by its predecessors.

The Washington Times in its review found the story-line to be "vintage McCall Smith" with abundant philosophy and humor.

The Sunday Times said "Forget the library - the body is in the mud hut. An African Miss Marple created by a Scottish lawyer ... superb".

Kirkus Reviews considers the plot to use a deus ex machina, Orphan Farm matron Mma Potokwane to resolve the problems, but "all’s well that ends well in perhaps the most tranquil and unruffled entry in this renowned series."

South China Morning Post likened this novel to the previous novels that mix gentle humor with Botswana culture.
