= The Double Comfort Safari Club =

- First edition
- Author: Alexander McCall Smith
- Language: English
- Series: The No. 1 Ladies' Detective Agency
- Genre: Mystery
- Publisher: Little, Brown
- Publication date: 2010
- Publication place: Scotland
- Pages: 256
- ISBN: 978-1408701065
- Preceded by: Tea Time for the Traditionally Built (2009)
- Followed by: The Saturday Big Tent Wedding Party (2011)

The Double Comfort Safari Club, published in 2010, is the eleventh in The No. 1 Ladies' Detective Agency series of novels by Alexander McCall Smith, set in Gaborone, Botswana, and featuring the Motswana protagonist Precious Ramotswe.

== Plot summary ==
Mma Ramotswe and Mma Makutsi are called to a safari lodge in Botswana's Okavango Delta to carry out a delicate mission on behalf of a former guest. The Okavango makes Precious appreciate once again the beauty of her homeland: it is a paradise of teeming wildlife, majestic grasslands and sparkling water. However, it is also home to rival safari operators, fearsome crocodiles and disgruntled hippopotamuses. What is more, Mma Makutsi still has not set a date for her wedding to Phuti Radiphuti and is feeling rather tetchy herself, not least because of Phuti's possessive aunt. But Precious knows that with a little patience, just as the wide river will gently make its way round any obstacle, so will everything work out for the best in the end.
