= The Miracle at Speedy Motors =

- First edition
- Author: Alexander McCall Smith
- Language: English
- Series: The No. 1 Ladies' Detective Agency
- Genre: Detective, Mystery novel
- Publisher: Little, Brown
- Publication date: 2008
- Publication place: Scotland
- Media type: Print (Hardback & Paperback), Audio (CD)
- Pages: 256 pp
- ISBN: 978-0-316-03007-6
- OCLC: 181422305
- Preceded by: The Good Husband of Zebra Drive
- Followed by: Tea Time for the Traditionally Built

The Miracle at Speedy Motors, published in 2008, is the ninth in The No. 1 Ladies' Detective Agency series of novels by Alexander McCall Smith, set in Gaborone, Botswana, and featuring the Motswana protagonist Precious Ramotswe.

== Plot summary ==
The private detective Precious Ramotswe gets a threatening letter from an unknown sender which makes her question her optimistic view and the dangers of being famous in Botswana.

While she ponders the identity of the letter-writer, Mma Ramotswe has a further set of problems to solve, both professional and personal. There is an adopted child's poignant search for her true family and Mr J.L.B. Matekoni's pursuit of an expensive miracle for their foster daughter Motholeli.
