= The Full Cupboard of Life =

Novel by Alexander McCall Smith

- First edition
- Author: Alexander McCall Smith
- Language: English
- Series: The No. 1 Ladies' Detective Agency series
- Genre: Detective, Mystery novel
- Publisher: Polygon Books (2003); Abacus (2004)
- Publication date: 2003
- Publication place: Scotland
- Media type: Print (Hardback & Paperback), Audio (Cassette & CD)
- Pages: 202
- ISBN: 978-0954407506 First UK edition
- OCLC: 59259530
- Preceded by: The Kalahari Typing School for Men (2002)
- Followed by: In the Company of Cheerful Ladies (2004)

The Full Cupboard of Life is the fifth in The No. 1 Ladies' Detective Agency series of novels by Alexander McCall Smith, set in Gaborone, Botswana, and featuring the Motswana protagonist Precious Ramotswe as principal detective.

In this novel, Mma Ramotswe is asked to vet the four men offering marriage to one woman, who cannot tell which of them wants her money and which is in love with her. Mma Makutsi moves to new quarters, which her raise in pay and promotion allow. Mr JLB Matekoni gets roped into doing a parachute jump at a fundraiser for the orphan farm. He persuades his apprentice to do it instead of him; but there is a bigger reason to get Mr JLB Matekoni to that event. Mma Potokwane has arranged his wedding to Mma Ramotswe.

This novel has been reviewed as "delightful", "charmingly gossamer", "witty, elegant, gentle, compassionate and exotic.", praised for "the warm humanity infused throughout" and the whole series to date described as "literary confection of such gossamer deliciousness". In short, it has been well received by reviewers in the US and in the UK. Further, it received the first Saga Award for Wit in 2003; Saga is a UK firm whose audience is people over 50 years old.

== Plot summary ==
Mma Ramotswe is now engaged to the mechanic Mr. JLB Matekoni, but he seems reluctant to set a wedding date, which makes her a little unhappy. She takes on an interesting investigation: Mma Holonga, a rich businesswoman who is seeking a husband, asks Mma Ramotswe to check the men on her shortlist of four, to eliminate those who only want her for her money. Meanwhile, Mma Makutsi, Mma Ramotswe's assistant, moves to better rooms thanks to her promotion and extra income, but is mourning the loss of her brother.

Mma Potokwani, the formidable matron of the orphan farm, manoeuvres Mr J.L.B. Matekoni into agreeing to do a sponsored parachute jump to benefit the orphans. The gentle and timid mechanic is terrified at the prospect, Mma Ramotswe solves the parachute problem by persuading the garage apprentice Charlie to do it instead, convincing him that it will make him attractive to girls. Mma Potokwani offers to sort out the matter of the wedding by arranging it all herself, and presenting it to Mr JLB Matekoni as a fait accompli – Mma Ramotswe agrees, although Mma Makutsi is horrified.

Everyone assembles at the orphan farm to watch Charlie's parachute jump, which is successful. Mma Potokwani surprises everyone by announcing that she has made all the preparations for the wedding and, with the help of a priest who is present, Mma Ramotswe and Mr JLB Matekoni are married there and then.

== Reception ==
This novel has been reviewed as "delightful", "charmingly gossamer", "witty, elegant, gentle, compassionate, and exotic." It is also praised for "the warm humanity infused throughout" and the whole series to date as "literary confection of such gossamer deliciousness". In short, the novel has been well received by reviewers in the US and in the UK.

Publishers Weekly finds this novel "delightful". Mma Ramotswe always solves her cases, but not in haste, and follows a code of behavior and decency. They credit the author for his "always engaging" way of portraying the code that guides his protagonists.

Kirkus Reviews calls this a "charmingly gossamer mystery" in this "enchanting series" of mystery novels. There is a focus on marriage in this novel, including her own, after such a long engagement. They describe the strength of the protagonist, Mma Ramotswe, who "provides less detection than advice, and wise advice it turns out to be, even when her clients decline to take it."

Marcel Berlins finds the protagonist of this novel to be the "magnificent Mma Ramotswe" who operates on intuition and common sense. She is skilled without much education or special training. He mentions that McCall Smith's novels have brought attention to a successful African nation that is not otherwise well-known. He finds this and the prior novels to be "witty, elegant, gentle, compassionate, and exotic."

Janet Malcolm, in an article reviewing the next book in the series, mentions the continuing theme in the novels of men as the weaker sex, and cites an incident in and quotes from this novel as one of the most charged examples of women succeeding in getting men to do what they need done. It "occurs at a rural orphanage and involves a fruitcake. Mma Potokwane, the bossy head of the orphanage, serves the cake to people from whom she wishes to extract favors; no one who eats the cake can refuse her. In the fifth book of the series, "The Full Cupboard of Life," McCall Smith spells out the reference that has obscurely hovered over the scene: "Just as Eve had used an apple to trap Adam, so Mma Potokwane used fruitcake. Fruitcake, apples - it made no difference, really. Oh foolish, weak men!" Malcolm comments about all the novels in the series to date that "The No. 1 Ladies' Detective Agency series is a literary confection of such gossamer deliciousness that one feels it can only be good for one."

Clea Simon wrote that the mysteries closest to home are the most challenging to solve, and in this novel, marriage is that mystery. Simon calls this a "cozy mystery series", noting how the secondary characters begin to grow in this novel. The novel is true to its protagonist's strong moral code, but this novel adds the sly humour of the author. Simon considers the success of the series in bringing readers back for another novel to rest on "the warm humanity infused throughout".

== Awards ==
2003: Winner of the first ever Saga Award for Wit.

== Publication history ==
There was an interesting pathway for knowledge and appreciation of the series by McCall Smith, a Scot, featuring Precious Ramotswe, the female detective in Botswana, to reach England. Marcel Berlins notes in his review of this novel that it is the fifth in a series, but the first to be readily available in England, via the success of the series in America. "This novel by an eminent Scottish law professor about a woman detective in Botswana is the fifth in a series, the other four having largely escaped English attention (and availability). The Scots have had better luck: they've known about McCall Smith for several years, but it has taken his extraordinary and unexpected success in the US for word to have filtered back to England that he's a treasure of a writer whose books deserve immediate devouring."

== Chapters ==
1. A Great Sadness among the Cars of Botswana
2. How to Run an Orphan Farm
3. Mma Ramotswe Visits her Cousin in Mochudi, and Thinks
4. A Woman Who Knows About Hair
5. Mr J.L.B. Matekoni has Cause to Reflect
6. Mr Mopedi Bobologo
7. Early Morning at Tlokweng Road Speedy Motors
8. Tea is Always the Solution
9. How to Handle Young Men through the Application of Psychology
10. Mr J.L.B Matekoni's Dream
11. Meeting Mr Bobologo
12. Mr Bobologo Talks on the Subject of Loose Women
13. Mr J.L.B Matekoni Receives the Butcher's Car; the Apprentices Receive an Anonymous Letter
14. Inside the House of Hope
15. Bad Men are Just Little Boys, Underneath
16. Mma Potokwani and Mma Ramotswe Discuss Marriage
17. Mr Spokes Spokesi, the Airwave Rider
18. The Parachute Jump, and a Universal Truth about the Giving and Taking of Advice
19. A Very Rich Cake is Served
