= Tears of the Giraffe =

Novel by Alexander McCall Smith

- First edition
- Author: Alexander McCall Smith
- Language: English
- Series: The No. 1 Ladies' Detective Agency
- Genre: Detective novel, mystery novel
- Publisher: Polygon Books
- Publication date: 2000
- Publication place: Scotland
- Media type: Print
- Pages: 227
- ISBN: 978-0-7486-6273-9 First Edinburgh edition
- OCLC: 49495035
- Dewey Decimal: 823 /.914 21
- LC Class: PR6063.C326 T4 2002
- Preceded by: The No. 1 Ladies' Detective Agency
- Followed by: Morality for Beautiful Girls

Tears of the Giraffe is the second in The No. 1 Ladies' Detective Agency series of novels by Alexander McCall Smith, set in Botswana, which features the Motswana protagonist Precious Ramotswe.

The agency takes on two cases, one involving a college-aged boy who disappeared ten years earlier, and the other a local man who does not understand why his wife is so long away from home each day. The engagement of Mma Ramotswe and Mr JLB Matekoni endures, as he gets her a diamond engagement ring, and takes on two children from the orphan farm. A crime against Mma Ramotswe does not come off, leading the culprit, maid to her fiancé, to prison instead.

One reviewer finds the writing both dignified and humorous, and describes the protagonist as imperturbable. Another quotes a dialogue in this novel as an excellent example how the author "plays the two cultures against each other" evenhandedly, the two cultures being the West and the "primitive" country of Botswana. The satire in the conversation is remarked as worthy of Mark Twain.

== Plot summary ==
Newly engaged Mma Ramotswe is not impressed with Mr JLB Matekoni's maid, Florence Pena. Unknown to him, she has been sleeping in his bed with her men friends. Obvious to Mma Ramotswe is that she does not keep the house clean. The maid, sensing that the forthcoming marriage will involve unpleasant changes in her own life, attempts to plant a gun at Mma Ramotswe's home to have her jailed.

Mr JLB Matekoni is maneuvered by Mma Potokwane, the matron of the orphan farm, into offering a home to Motholeli and Puso, a sister and brother orphaned in the bush. He worries that this may affect his engagement to Mma Ramotswe. He likes the girl, who displays an aptitude for, and interest in, the work of the garage.

The first case is that of an American woman in her fifties who lost her son Michael Curtin in Africa ten years earlier. Mrs Curtin suspects he died but does not know and wants resolution. Mma Ramotswe meets the people who were involved in the community to which he belonged while his family lived in Gaborone. His attachment to the community kept him from returning to the US for his time at college. Mma Ramotswe speaks to the secretary in the college where one man from that time now teaches. It is the secretary's last day, and she dislikes the professor for what he did to a relative of hers, and to many other women. Mma Ramotswe encounters the professor, who is a womanizer, known for dishonest manipulation to gain favors from his female students. She mixes lies with the truth to him, in short uses blackmail, to pull the truth of the events from him. She was powerful against him, to keep herself in charge of the situation. The professor had just started seeing the young man's girlfriend Carla, and she was pregnant with the young man's son. Michael encountered the two together in a small hut. The two men fought; Michael ran and fell into a deep ditch (a donga) and broke his neck. Mma Ramotswe feels the goal is to let Mma Curtin come to peace, so she agrees not to bring any of this information to the police, as it ought to have been originally. They buried the son without telling anyone what happened. Next she meets Carla in Zimbabwe where she lives with that child, a son. She agrees to meet the mother of her long ago lover to tell her the story and let her meet her grandson.

Mma Ramotswe sees Mr JLB Matekoni with the children on their day out shopping for new clothes. She meets them and understands that he has adopted them. She decides he is a very kind man, and takes the children to her house, where the family will live. Mr JLB Matekoni learns on a call to his garage that his maid has been arrested. Her plan turns against her, as her friend calls the police on her, and she ends up behind bars, all events occurring without her employer being aware of them, save for the result.

Mma Ramotswe accepts the case of Mr Badule, a butcher who suspects his wife of an affair. Mma Makutsi expresses her yearning to do detective work, and Mma Ramotswe promotes her to assistant detective, while also retaining her secretarial role. Mma Makutsi follows the wife and talks with the maids at the home where the wife goes. She discovers that the woman's son – unknown to her husband – is the son of another man, himself married to a wealthy wife, who is paying for the boy's private education. Mma Makutsi finds it difficult to tell a lie, but she understands the importance of not hurting the client with information he does not need to know. Forced to report to the client herself, she tells him his wife is seeing another man so that his son can get the private school education he needs. Mr Badule does not learn the son is not his biological son, which would crush him. All the adults continue as they had, and the boy stays in school. The solution of the butcher's case is the first test of Mma Makutsi's detective and diplomatic skills.

Mma Ramotswe gives a small basket as a gift to Mrs Curtin, explaining the meaning of its designs as being the tears of a giraffe, meaning that we all have something to give, and the giraffe has its tears to give. Mrs Curtin's newly found grandson, is keen on geology, identifying rocks to Mma Ramotswe as the two walk outside while his mother tells his grandmother the events of ten years earlier. The boy looks at Mma Ramotswe's engagement ring and identifies it as cubic zirconia, not the diamond Mr JLB Matekoni and she thought they bought.

== Characters ==
- Mma Precious Ramotswe: Owner of the No. 1 Ladies' Detective Agency in Gaborone, Botswana. She is self-taught as a detective, and generally successful in resolving the cases brought to her. In her youth, she married a musician who was cruel to her. She had a baby who died soon after birth, and learned she could have no more children. She is in her thirties. She recently became engaged to marry Mr JLB Matekoni. She drives a tiny white van which she has had for 11 years.
- Obed Ramotswe: Late father of Precious, who was a strong and wise man. She loves him dearly and often thinks of him as she solves her cases, and as she decides to become engaged to Mr JLB Matekoni and accept the orphans he took in.
- Mr JLB Matekoni: Owner of Tlokweng Road Speedy Motors garage, and possibly the best mechanic in Botswana. He is a very kind man, in his forties.
- Mma Grace Makutsi: She is the secretary to Mma Ramotswe, very efficient, known for scoring 97 on her final exam at the secretarial college. She wears large glasses. She is one of a large family, and she struggled to pay the fees for her education. She has good insight into many situations, but lacks the ease in viewing life that marks her employer. She is in her twenties.
- Mma Silvia Potokwane: Matron of the orphan farm outside Gaborone. She is a most persuasive woman, in seeking help for her orphans and keeping the place running. Mr JLB Matekoni donates his time and skill to keep water pumps and the vehicles in running condition. He has known her since his childhood, as she was a friend of his mother.
- Florence Pena: Maid to Mr JLB for many years. She is upset that her employer is engaged to Mma Ramotswe, who calls her out for the dirty state of his house on her first visit there. She plots to get Mma Ramotswe arrested for having a gun in her home, which plot turns on her, so that she is arrested for having a gun in her own house.
- Motholeli: Twelve-year-old girl now living at the orphan farm. Her mother died when she was 7, of snake bite. The custom of her people was to bury a newborn still nursing with the mother, if the mother died for any reason. Motholeli recovered her brother from the shallow grave and headed for the road, where a kind couple picked her up. She and the baby were in hospital, as Motholeli had tuberculosis and the boy needed care. Recovered from the worst of it, a woman at the hospital takes the two of them home. She has a recurrence of TB that leaves her unable to walk, and she uses a wheelchair. When that family must relocate for the husband's job, she and her young brother are placed at the orphan farm, a few months before the story starts.
- Puso: Five years younger brother of Motholeli. He is a lively boy, well-behaved like his sister, who has been caring for him since his birth. He and his sister are of the Basarwa people of Gaborone, hunter-gatherers who live in the bush.
- Andrea Curtin: American widow, age 55, who lived in Gaborone ten to twelve years earlier with her husband and son. The son disappeared in Botswana after she and her husband returned to the US. Her husband died a few years earlier, and she seeks resolution of the fate of her son, asking Precious Ramotswe to help her.
- Michael Curtin: Son of American client of Mma Ramotswe, who arrived in Gaborone with his parents just after completing high school. He put off college for a year to stay in Africa. He joined a community of people who thought they could farm the desert near Molepolole, a city about 50 km from Gaborone. He disappeared ten years before the story begins, and no investigations at the time revealed what happened to him.
- Dr Oswald Ranta: Professor of economics who lived in the community ten years earlier, and who knew the facts of the fate of Mrs Curtin's son. He is a man with evil in his character, a man of no morals, who is accustomed to ordering people about, mistreating women and lying to manipulate people.
- Carla Smit: Michael's lover and mother of his son, at the community in the rural area near Molepolole. She took up with Ranta as well. She is an Afrikaans woman from South Africa. After Botswana, she took a job in Bulawayo after leaving Botswana. She has a nine-year-old son.
- Mr Letsenyane Badule: Owner of his own butcher shop, Honest Deal Butchery, and a man who had risen in another company based on his ability to root out dishonesty and thievery that increased the success of that company. He is married and has a son. His wife is a beautiful woman, dressing in the best of taste. He does not understand how she has the money for her clothes, nor how she found the money to pay for tuition for their son's private schooling. He is very proud of his son. She is not home much. He comes to Mma Ramotswe to learn the truth, as he fears his wife is seeing another man.
- Rose: Maid to Mma Ramotswe. She is conscientious and reliable, a strong contrast to Florence Peno, the maid the Mr JLB Matekoni.

== Reviews ==
Publishers Weekly mentioned the book, saying "Alexander McCall Smith (The No. 1 Ladies' Detective Agency) offers the second and third installments of his dignified, humorous Botswanan series. In Tears of the Giraffe, PI Precious Ramotswe tracks a missing American man whose widowed mother appeals to Ramotswe; meanwhile, the imperturbable detective is endangered at home by her fiancé's resentful maid."

In a review of a later book in the series, Janet Malcolm mentions an aspect of the author's writing that shows best in this second novel of the series: "McCall Smith follows the satiric literary tradition in which a "primitive" culture is held up to show the laughable backwardness of Western society. . . . To illustrate the brilliant evenhandedness with which McCall Smith plays the two cultures against each other, here is a conversation between Mma Potokwane and Mr JLB Matekoni that takes place in Tears of the Giraffe, the second book of the series." She quotes the conversation in Tears of the Giraffe between Mr JLB Matekoni and Mma Potokwane, matron of the orphan farm, after she has been reading some of Freud's works, finding them not wholly useful. She says that "The passage is a tour de force of double-edged irony" and she considers some of the remarks in that dialogue worthy of Mark Twain. She mentions the "playfulness" of McCall Smith in these novels, keeping them from being heavy-handed morality tales.

== Publication history ==
Per Kirkus Reviews, the novels had their American publication later than in the UK. The first three novels appeared in 2002 in the US. In their review of the first novel in the series, Kirkus Reviews notes that "The first American publication of this 1999 debut has been preceded by two special Booker citations and two sequels, Tears of the Giraffe (2000) and Morality for Beautiful Girls (2001), both forthcoming in the series."
