= The No. 1 Ladies' Detective Agency =

Novel series

The No. 1 Ladies' Detective Agency Series
- Author: Alexander McCall Smith
- Country: United Kingdom
- Language: English
- Genre: Crime fiction
- Media type: Print (hardback & paperback), eBook, audiobook

The No. 1 Ladies' Detective Agency is a series of novels by Alexander McCall Smith set in Botswana and featuring the character Mma Precious Ramotswe. The series is named after the first novel, published in 1998. Twenty-six novels have been published in the series between 1998 and 2025.

Mma Precious Ramotswe is the main character in this series. Mma Ramotswe starts up her detective agency using the inheritance from her father to move to the capital city, Gaborone, to buy a house for herself and an office for her new business. She feels a detective needs to know about people more than anything to solve problems for them. The novels are as much about the adventures and foibles of different characters as they are about solving mysteries. Each book in the series follows from the previous book.

The readership was at first small, then grew abruptly in popularity in the US and in England, beyond the author's home in Scotland. In 2004, sales in English exceeded five million, and the series has been translated to other languages. Critical reception has matched the sales of the novels, generally positive, and considering the strength of the novels to be in the characters and Mma Ramotswe's wisdom rather than in the specific mysteries solved in each novel.

The novels have been adapted for radio by the author and for television.

== Synopsis of series ==
The main detective, Mma Ramotswe, is a Motswana woman who is the protagonist in the series and whose story is told in the first novel from birth to opening the detective agency. Mma is a Setswana term of respect for a woman; the equivalent term for a man is Rra. This is one of the most common forms of address in the novels.

Mma Precious Ramotswe solves cases for wives whose husbands have gone missing, for a school teacher whose son has disappeared, by finding the kidnappers, for a wealthy father whose 16-year-old daughter is frustrating him by going out on her own. She helps a man atone for the sins of his youth by finding the people he hurt decades earlier. She uncovers a scheme by twin brothers to use one medical degree and certificate between the two of them. She solves a case for herself when she thinks she must seek a divorce from her first husband but learns differently when she seeks out his mother. Her personal life has a main sorrow, that her only child lived just a few days, as the child's father beat her during the pregnancy, a story told in retrospect. This led her to decide never to marry again after he left her. Her joy is her engagement and eventual marriage to Mr J. L. B. Matekoni, who has taken on foster care of a sister and brother from the orphan farm. The cases are set in the cities of Botswana, mainly on the edge of the Kalahari desert, rather than in the desert. There are occasional forays into neighbouring nations.

After her first few cases, she purchases a book by Clovis Andersen on detection, The Principles of Private Detection, and then quotes from it throughout the novels when a guide is needed for deciding next steps.

== US publication history ==
Per Kirkus Reviews, the early novels in this series had their American publication later than in the UK, which published the first in 1998, the second in 2000, and the third, Morality for Beautiful Girls, in 2001. The first three novels appeared in 2002 in the USA. In their review of the first novel in the series, Kirkus Reviews notes that "The first American publication of this 1999 debut has been preceded by two special Booker citations and two sequels, Tears of the Giraffe (2000) and Morality for Beautiful Girls (2001), both forthcoming in the series."

In an item from the Wisconsin Public Radio program, To the Best of Our Knowledge, the first novel "The No. 1 Ladies' Detective Agency, was a surprise hit [in Scotland], receiving two special Booker citations and a place on the Times Literary Supplement's International Books of the Year and the Millennium list." The UK success did not speed publishers to release it in the USA. "American publishers were slow to take an interest, and by the time The No. 1 Ladies' Detective Agency was picked up by Pantheon Books, Smith had already written two sequels. The books went from underground hits to national phenomena in the United States, spawning fan clubs and inspiring celebratory reviews."

In the Company of Cheerful Ladies was the first of the No. 1 Ladies' Detective Agency novels to be printed in hardback, with a very large initial print run of 101,000 copies to meet the anticipated demand, as sales in English of the series to date, in 2004, exceeded five million.

In reviewing the fifth novel in the series, Marcel Berlins describes the pathway of the growing audience, requiring one to understand that although Scotland and England are part of the same kingdom, the residents do not read the same books at the same time. He notes in his review of The Full Cupboard of Life that it is the fifth in a series, but the first to be readily available in England, via the success of the series in the US. "This novel by an eminent Scottish law professor about a woman detective in Botswana is the fifth in a series, the other four having largely escaped English attention (and availability). The Scots have had better luck: they've known about McCall Smith for several years, but it has taken his extraordinary and unexpected success in the US for word to have filtered back to England that he's a treasure of a writer whose books deserve immediate devouring."

== Reception and awards ==
The novels are as much about the adventures and foibles of different characters as they are about solving mysteries. Each novel in the series follows on from the previous one as to setting and plot. McCall Smith's writing style in this series is "deceptively simple" as he "writes in a clear, uncomplicated prose, yet his work is nonetheless insightful and perceptive. His humour is dry, charming and kind-hearted, revealing an author who is keenly observant without a trace of maliciousness."

Marcel Berlins finds the protagonist of The Full Cupboard of Life to be the "magnificent Mma Ramotswe" who operates on intuition and common sense, skilled without much education or special training. He mentions that McCall Smith's novels have brought attention to a successful African nation that is not otherwise well-known. He finds this and the prior novels to be "witty, elegant, gentle, compassionate and exotic." This was the first of the novels available in England (see Publication history). Despite its proximity to Scotland, awareness and availability of the novels in England came after their popularity in the US.

The novels have been reviewed in other languages than the original English; for example, this generally favourable review of the series up to the novel published in 2014, The Handsome Man's De Luxe Café, in a Czech online magazine: "Alexander McCall Smith, however, can enrich the stories of his everyday heroes with a profoundly human understanding of man's weaknesses".

In 2004, the year of the sixth novel's publication, Alexander McCall Smith won the Author of the Year award at the British Book Awards and the Crime Writers' Association Dagger in the Library award, both for the No. 1 Ladies' Detective Agency series.

== Characters in the series ==
=== Main ===
- Mma Precious Ramotswe, the first female private investigator in Botswana. She is a 'traditionally built' Motswana heroine and the protagonist of the series. After a disaster marriage to Note Mokoti and the loss of their child, she decides to become a detective, setting up The No. 1 Ladies' Detective Agency, an agency run by ladies, which does not, as many think, only cater to women. Mma Ramotswe is clever and can size people up very easily. She has a wide circle of friends and often talks to them about recent events at the President Hotel close to where she lives on Zebra Drive, in Gaborone, Botswana – this list includes Mr. J. L. B. Matekoni and Hector Lepondise, both of whom wish to marry her. Like many in the area, she speaks fluent English and Setswana.
- Mma Grace Makutsi, the agency's only employee, first as secretary, then as assistant detective, and then associate detective, then partner in business. She has very large glasses and while not glamorous, is very pretty. She attended the Botswana Secretarial College and in the final exam scored a record 97%, of which she constantly talks about. She is trilingual, speaking her father’s tongue, Setswana, the tongue of her mother, Ikalanga, and English.
- Mr. J. L. B. Matekoni, mechanic and proprietor of Tlokweng Road Speedy Motors, Mma Ramotswe's suitor and eventual husband. He is always referred to in these novels by this very formal title (he even refers to himself by that name). His full name is John Limpopo Basil Matekoni, and (according to a radio interview with the author on BBC World Service) he is embarrassed by the Basil. He is a reliable and kind man who is very devoted to his job, friends and business. He sees machines as living objects and tries to preserve car engines as well as possible – this leads him to get angry at other mechanics who hold no regard for the property of others. He is highly regarded as a mechanic within Gaborone, and many prominent men take their cars to him despite his garage being smaller than that of some of his rivals. While possessing a large amount of courage, he can be pushed around easily. Again, like most in the area, he speaks fluent English and Setswana.

=== Secondary ===
- Mr. Obed Ramotswe, father of Precious, known to her as her Daddy. He worked in the mines in his younger days, then came home to raise his daughter and continue increasing his herd of cattle. He was known for his keen eye for the best cattle, and bred some of his own. He tells his own story in the first novel, and is mentioned often by Mma Ramotswe throughout the series owing to his wisdom and loving attitude to his daughter and family.
- Charlie, the older of the two apprentices in Mr. J. L. B. Matekoni's garage. He is always thinking about girls and can often be seen to be doing little dances during this. He is later cut from his apprenticeship and joins the No. 1 Ladies Detective Agency as a Junior Assistant Detective.
- Fanwell, the younger apprentice, is only referred to as the "younger apprentice" in the earlier novels. His name is not mentioned until Tea Time for the Traditionally Built. He lives in a small house with his grandmother and his several younger brothers and sisters. Although he is slightly more serious than his older friend, Charlie, he still frequently discusses girls with him. He eventually becomes a mechanic in The Limpopo Academy of Private Detection.
- Mr Polopetsi, an assistant to Mma Ramotswe and Mr J. L. B. Matekoni. He is introduced in In The Company of Cheerful Ladies. After disappearing from the series, he returns in The Woman Who Walked In Sunshine. It is announced that he has become an assistant Chemistry teacher at a local secondary school, but comes back to work at the agency part time whilst Mma Ramotswe is on her holiday.
- Phuti Radiphuti, Grace Makutsi's husband. He is introduced in In The Company of Cheerful Ladies, and they marry in The Saturday Big Tent Wedding Party. He is kind, clever, extremely gentle and well-spoken. In The Double Comfort Safari Club, he has an accident in which he loses his foot, which causes Mma Makutsi to worry about their relationship.
- Violet Sephotho, Mma Makutsi's rival from the Botswana Secretarial College, introduced in In the Company of Cheerful Ladies. She returns in most books subsequent to her introduction with new schemes to ruin Mma Makutsi's life with Rra Phuti Radiphuti. In The Saturday Big Tent Wedding Party, she is discussed as running for parliament in an upcoming by-election but makes no direct appearance. In The Minor Adjustment Beauty Salon she is named as the owner of the dress shop Botswana Elegance, but again makes no direct appearance. She is described as very glamorous but very nasty and not very smart.
- Dr Moffat, The doctor and his wife are good friends of Mma Ramotswe, and he treats Mr J. L. B. Matekoni when he falls into a deep depression. He is based on a real person, Howard Moffat, a direct descendant of Robert Moffat, the Scottish missionary whose daughter Mary married David Livingstone.
- Mma Silvia Potokwane, matron of the 'Orphan Farm', always ready to offer wisdom, bush tea and fruit cake to Mma Ramotswe. Mma Potokwane is effective in achieving her goals for the orphans and the orphan farm. This skill has Mr. J. L. B. Matekoni doing mechanical repairs for free and later taking on two foster children. Moreover, despite being incredibly pushy, she looks out for all her friends and is happy to do favours for them. She has much family on her husband's side; Mma Ramotswe meets Comfort Potokwane and another Mma Potokwane in the sixteenth novel of the series.
- Note Mokoti, Mma Precious Ramotswe's former husband and father of her short-lived baby. Note is a trumpet player and very seductive. Note treated Mma Ramotswe poorly and violently and Precious says that marrying him was a mistake. Later she learns he was married to another woman at the time of their marriage, so she has no need of divorce prior to her marriage to Matekoni. Before Note’s marriage ceremony to Mma Ramotswe, Obed Ramotswe advised his daughter against marrying him.
- Motholeli and Puso, Ramotswe and Mr J. L. B. Matekoni's two adopted children. While among the earlier novels Puso keeps himself to himself, Motholeli shows a keen interest in being a mechanic like her adoptive father, despite using a wheelchair due to an illness when she was younger.
- Clovis Andersen, an American, author of the self-published The Principles of Private Detection and idol of both Mma Ramotswe and Mma Makutsi. He arrives for a visit in The Limpopo Academy of Private Detection and his presence helps to solve a very personal case.
- Itumelang Clovis Radiphuti, the infant son of Mma Makutsi and Phuti Radiphuti, born three weeks premature in The Minor Adjustment Beauty Salon. Charlie, who often argues with Mma Makutsi, stated that Itumelang was a '100%' baby. Fanwell is also fond of the child.
- Queenie-Queenie, Charlie's wife.
- Charlie Gotso, an influential yet sinister man who owns a chain of shops and takes muti, which he believes keeps him powerful. He has met many noble and royal people such as Moshoeshoe II. It is commonly known in Gaborone that if you refused a demand of Gotso, he would make your life more difficult in subtle ways.
- Hector Lepondise, a wealthy businessman who owns a factory making a particular type of bolts. Many staff within his factory are his family members. He is good friends with Mma Ramotswe and wants her to marry him.
- Daisy, the third foster child of Mma Ramotswe and Mr J. L. B. Matekoni, who Mma Potokwane forcefully persuades Mma Ramotswe to adopt in To the Land of Long Lost Friends.

== Series order ==
1. The No. 1 Ladies' Detective Agency (1998)
2. Tears of the Giraffe (2000)
3. Morality for Beautiful Girls (2001)
4. The Kalahari Typing School for Men (2002)
5. The Full Cupboard of Life (2004)
6. In The Company of Cheerful Ladies (2004)
7. Blue Shoes and Happiness (2006)
8. The Good Husband of Zebra Drive (2007)
9. The Miracle at Speedy Motors (2008)
10. Tea Time for the Traditionally Built (2009)
11. The Double Comfort Safari Club (2010)
12. The Saturday Big Tent Wedding Party (2011)
13. The Limpopo Academy of Private Detection (2012)
14. The Minor Adjustment Beauty Salon (2013)
15. The Handsome Man's De Luxe Café (2014)
16. The Woman Who Walked in Sunshine (2015)
17. Precious and Grace (2016)
18. The House of Unexpected Sisters (2017)
19. The Colours of All the Cattle (2018)
20. To the Land of Long Lost Friends (2019)
21. How to Raise an Elephant (2020)
22. The Joy and Light Bus Company (2021)
23. A Song of Comfortable Chairs (2022)
24. From a Far and Lovely Country (2023)
25. The Great Hippopotamus Hotel (2024)
26. In the Time of Five Pumpkins (2025)
27. The Big Cats Dance Party (2026)

== Adaptations ==
The novels have been adapted both for radio and television.

=== Television ===
The BBC and American television network HBO filmed a series based on the books that stars Jill Scott as Mma Ramotswe and was shot on location in Botswana. The 109-minute pilot was written by Richard Curtis and Anthony Minghella, who also directed. The six 60-minute episodes were written and directed by others, as Minghella died before the series was filmed.

=== Radio ===
McCall Smith himself dramatised the series for BBC Radio 4. Thirty-five episodes have been broadcast, the first on 10 September 2004, and the most recent on 23 September 2019. The episodes encompass the first to the nineteenth books. Claire Benedict plays Mma Ramotswe for most of the episodes up to 2016, with Janice Acquah playing the lead for the 2010 episodes, and from 2017 onwards.

== Related book ==
A cookbook associated with the novels was published in 2009; Mma Ramotswe's Cookbook by Stuart Brown, with a foreword by Alexander McCall Smith.
