= The Saturday Big Tent Wedding Party =

2011 novel by Alexander McCall Smith

- First edition
- Author: Alexander McCall Smith
- Language: English
- Genre: Mystery, Detective fiction
- Publisher: Little, Brown
- Publication date: 2011
- Publication place: Scotland
- Pages: 256
- ISBN: 978-1-4087-0258-1
- Preceded by: The Double Comfort Safari Club (2010)
- Followed by: The Limpopo Academy of Private Detection (2012)

The Saturday Big Tent Wedding Party is the twelfth mystery novel The No. 1 Ladies' Detective Agency series by Alexander McCall Smith and first published in 2011. The Motswana Precious Ramotswe is featured as the principal detective.

== Plot summary ==
Precious Ramotswe is taunted by a dream in which she is driving her old white van. She discovers that her van is fixed up and running well again, so she hopes to retrieve it. Charlie is accused of getting his girlfriend pregnant with twin boys. He feels guilty and runs away. Mma Ramotswe investigates a case of rural jealousy in which cattle are being injured. Violet Sephotho runs for Botswana Parliament which is Botswana's worst nightmare.

== Reviews ==
Muriel Dobbin found this novel to be "Mr. McCall Smith at his benevolent best."
