= Birlinn (publisher) =

Scottish independent publishing house

- Founded: 1992
- Founder: Hugh Andrew
- Country of origin: United Kingdom (Scotland)
- Headquarters location: Edinburgh
- Distribution: BookSource (UK); NewSouth Books (Australia); Independent Publishers Group (US); Casemate (US military books)
- Publication types: Books
- Imprints: Polygon, Mercat
- Official website: birlinn.co.uk

Birlinn Limited is an independent publishing house based in Edinburgh, Scotland. It was established in 1992 by managing director Hugh Andrew.

== Imprints ==
Birlinn Limited is composed of a number of imprints, including:

- Birlinn, which publishes Scottish interest books, from biography to history, military history and Scottish Gaelic. (Its name comes from the old Norse word birlinn, meaning a long boat or small galley with 12 to 18 oars, used especially in the Hebrides and West Highlands of Scotland in the Middle Ages.)
- Polygon Books, which publishes literary fiction and poetry, both classic and modern, from Scottish writers such as Robin Jenkins, George Mackay Brown, and the author of The No. 1 Ladies' Detective Agency, Alexander McCall Smith. It was founded in the late 1960s by students of the University of Edinburgh.
- Mercat Press, founded in 1970 and acquired by Birlinn in 2007, which publishes walking and climbing guides. (Mercat is the Scots language word for "market" or "trade".)
- John Donald, publishing academic books about Scotland.

== Digital Publishing and Ebooks ==
Birlinn makes its titles available as ebooks through its own website as well as through other online retailers.

In collaboration with TannerRitchie Publishing and Edinburgh University Press, Birlinn publishes Scotland's History Online, a major collection of new and backlist academic Scottish historical research aimed at academic libraries and individual researchers.

== Notable authors and works ==
- Alexander McCall Smith
  - Love in the Time of Bertie (2021)
  - The People's City (2022)
- Martin C. Strong
  - The Great Folk Discography, Vol. 1: Pioneers & Early Legends (2010)
  - The Great Folk Discography, Vol. 2: The Next Generation (2011)
- Andy Wightman
  - The Poor Had No Lawyers (Third Edition, 2015)
