= Tlokweng =

- Village
- Nickname: Posh
- Location within Botswana
- Coordinates: 24°40′S 25°58′E
- Country: Botswana
- District: South-East District

Government
- Elevation: 1,002 m (3,287 ft)

Population (2011)
  - Total: 35,982
- Time zone: GMT +2
- Climate: BSh

Tlokweng is a peri-urban settlement classified as an urban village located east of the capital of Botswana, Gaborone and falling under the jurisdiction of South East District Council. It can be considered part of the conurbation of Gaborone. Tlokweng stands on the other side of the river, and is on the road to the border with South Africa, the border post being just 15 km to the east. The population was 35,982 at the 2011 census. It is now part of Gaborone agglomeration, home to 421,907 inhabitants at the 2011 census. The tribe originating from Tlokweng is referred to as Batlokwa. Many people from across Botswana have come to seek permanent and sometimes temporary settlement in Tlokweng because of its proximity to the capital city where most jobs are.

According to Asperen the settlement of Tlokweng has a dual spatial structure with a traditional unplanned area and a modern planned area. Tlokweng is surrounded by grazing and arable land use under tribal and freehold tenure.

== In literature ==
One of the main characters in The No. 1 Ladies' Detective Agency series of novels by Alexander McCall Smith is associated with Tlokweng. The protagonist, Mma Precious Ramotswe, marries Mr. J.L.B. Matekoni, born and raised in Tlokweng. J.L.B. Matekoni is the proprietor of a garage in Gaborone named "Tlokweng Road Speedy Motors".

== Notable people ==
- Renei Batlokwa
- Louis Goodwill Nchindo
