= Gaynor Macfarlane =

Radio drama producer & director

- Occupation: Director

Gaynor Macfarlane is a theatre and radio drama director, and producer for BBC Radio Drama at Pacific Quay, Glasgow.

== Career ==
Macfarlane directed the first up to the eleventh radio series of The No. 1 Ladies' Detective Agency.

In the theatre, Macfarlane has directed Wit by Margaret Edson, Folie à Trois by Sarah Wooley and The Past is not a Place by Beatrice Colin for the Stellar Quines Theatre Company; The Birds by Aristophanes and After the Rain by Sergi Belbel at the Gate Theatre; The House of Desires by Sor Juana Inés de la Cruz and Burdalane by Judith Adams at the Battersea Arts Centre; Damon and Pythias at the Globe and Helen at the RNT Studio.

She has been Literary Manager of the Gate Theatre, Script Advisor at the National Theatre and Dramaturg at the Globe during its first season. She also translated plays for the Almeida and Chichester Festival Theatre.

== Radio plays ==
Radio Plays Directed or Produced by Gaynor Macfarlane
Date first broadcast	Play	Author	Cast	Synopsis Awards	Station Series
1 November 1998	The Late Story: A Living Legend	Dilys Rose	Claire Benedict	An ageing singer gives what may be her last performance.	BBC Radio 4 The Late Story
31 May 1999	Rebus: Let It Bleed	Ian Rankin dramatised by Roger Danes	Alexander Morton, Caroline Loncq, James Bryce, Sarah Collier, Crawford Logan, Steven McNicoll, Sandy Neilson, Ann-Louise Ross, Doug Russell, Wendy Seager and Robin Thomson	A dramatic car chase ends in death and sparks an investigation by Detective Inspector Rebus that plunges deep into the very heart of local government uncovering political corruption and insider dealing.	BBC Radio 4 Afternoon Play
21 August 1999	So Much Blood	Simon Brett dramatised by Bert Coules	Bill Nighy, Jimmy Chisholm and John Paul Hurley	Charles Paris takes his one-man show to the 1999 Edinburgh Fringe Festival, filling a vacant spot at a student venue which is a hotbed of behind-the-scenes drama, until a stage dagger turns murderously into a real one.	BBC Radio 4 Saturday Play
26 January 2000	The Rocks Below	Beatrice Colin	Deirdre Davis, Mairl Gillespie, Derek McGhie, Gayanne Potter, Simon Tait and Paul Young	On a small Scottish island in the 1950s, identical twins are forced by the imminent death of their father to confront a secret.	BBC Radio 4 Afternoon Play
21 February 2000 – 3 March 2000	The Hours	Michael Cunningham abridged by Alison Joseph	Buffy Davis, Geraldine James and Elizabeth McGovern	A meditation on love, loss and time. Echoing Virginia Woolf's Mrs Dalloway, it gives a moving and eloquent account of one day in the lives of three very different women.	BBC Radio 4 Woman's Hour Drama
25 July 2000	Summer Sectioned	John Binnie	Lorelei King and Colin Stinton	An elegiac and moving encounter with the woman who was the muse of playwright Tennessee Williams – his sister Rose.	BBC Radio 4 Afternoon Play
23 October 2000 – 3 November 2000	The Weight of Water	Anita Shreve dramatised by Beatrice Colin	Nancy Crane, Derbhle Crotty, Emma Fielding, Karl Johnson, Page Marshall, Isobel Middleton, Stuart Milligan and Simon Scardlfleld	On the night of 5 March 1873, two women, both Norwegian emigrants, were murdered on the Isles of Shoals. In the present day, a newspaper photographer discovers a cache of papers that appear to give an eyewitness account of the murders.	BBC Radio 4 Woman's Hour Drama
17 April 2001	Zander's Boat	Grace Barnes	Vicki Masson, Rose McBain and Wendy Seager	Three generations of Shetland women reflect on their lives, on love and loss. Edith is coming to terms with the death of her son, Sylvia prays for a miracle, and Marie is finding the courage to live alone.	BBC Radio 4 Afternoon Play
8 July 2001	Wit	Margaret Edson adapted for radio by Judith Adams	Nancy Crane, Jasmine Hyne, John McGlynn, Stuart Milligan, Margaret Robertson, John Sharian, Adam Sims and Tracy Wiles	A brilliant scholar discovers that she has cancer and, through several courses of exhausting chemotherapy treatments, is forced to learn about wit, compassion and – finally – death.	BBC Radio 4
8 November 2002	Zeitgeist Man	Iain Heggie	Forbes Masson, Liam Brennan, Gayanne Potter, Eileen McCallum, Chris Young, Jo James and Cora Bissett	A biting comedy about writing, the media and the dream of catching the zeitgeist. Unsuccessful novelist, Hugh Crombie, inadvertently offers an idea to aspiring writer, Dekky Duff. A year passes and Dekky is hailed as the new sensation Scottish writer. He is the real thing, a genuine working class hero, a hospital porter turned novelist. Hugh is enraged and sets out to convince the world that he is the true Zeitgeist Man.	BBC Radio 4 Friday Play
20 March 2003	King of Shadows	Susan Cooper dramatised by Beatrice Colin	Buffy Davis, Sally Dexter, Tom George, Robert Glenister, Martin Hyder, Adam Sims and Andrew Woodall	A magical adventure story set both in the present day and in Elizabethan England. Chosen to play Puck in a production of A Midsummer Night's Dream at Shakespeare's Globe, young American Nat Field travels to London. Visiting the theatre for the first time, he falls seriously ill. When he awakes, he finds that he has gone back 400 years in time.	BBC Radio 4 Afternoon Play
19 April 2003	Turtle Diary	Russell Hoban dramatised by Alison Joseph	Geraldine James, Bill Nighy, Suzanne Heathcote, Martin Hyder, Isobel Middleton and Graham Turner	The turtles in London Zoo become the mutual obsession of two lonely strangers who dream of setting free the turtles and themselves.	BBC Radio 4 Saturday Play
4 May 2003 – 11 May 2003	Precious Bane	Mary Webb dramatised by Beatrice Colin	Louise Breckon-Richards, Laura Doddington, Owen Teale, Julia Ford, Tom Goodman-Hill, Helen Schlesinger, Maggie Steed, Nigel Terry and Timothy Watson	Prue Sam is born "hare shotten" and it is this hare lip that is her "precious bane". She is torn between loyalty to her recklessly ambitious brother, Gideon, and a deep unexpressed love for the weaver Kester Woodseaves.	BBC Radio 4 Classic Serial
28 October 2003	The Time Between Two Tides	Andy Macdonald	William Barlow, Kate Dickie, Tony Kearney, Gary Lewis, Steven McNicoll, Nick Underwood and Wendy Seager	A refugee boy is chased into the River Clyde. When a local lad leaps in to save him, both are trapped under a wharf building. In the time that it takes for the tide to change, and for a rescue to be mounted, truths are revealed about the boys, their families and the city in which they live.	BBC Radio 4 Afternoon Play
30 January 2004	Mapping the Heart	Beatrice Colin	Gayanne Potter, Stuart Milligan, Monica Gibb, Paul Young and Lewis Howden	An adventure story set in 1950 in the Brazilian rainforest. Scots-born Kristina Morrison is thrown together with opinionated American Ray Epstein when their light aircraft crashes in the jungle. Kristina finds herself torn between two men: Ray and her explorer father Felix.	BBC Radio 4 Afternoon Play
11 June 2004	Soft Fall the Sounds of Eden	Sharman Macdonald	Frances Grey, Patricia Kerrigan, Phyllida Law, Cal Macaninch, Shauna Macdonald, Colette O'Neil and Iain Robertson	What is Paradise? The hot Dumfries countryside in late summer is transformed into a Garden of Eden of sorts as diverse groups of locals enjoy the sunshine and reflect on their lives. A beautiful and evocative play about freedom, the impact of the choices we make, and about picking brambles on a hot afternoon in Scotland.	BBC Radio 4 Friday Play
10 September 2004	The Daddy	Alexander McCall Smith	Claire Benedict, Nadine Marshall, Joseph Marcell, Janice Acquah, Gbemisola Ikumelo, Jude Akuwudike, Chuk Iwuji, Maynard Eziashi, Peter Gevisser, Noma Dumezweni, Emmanuel Ighodaro, Willie Jonah, Ben Thomas, Alibe Parsons, Bhasker Patel, Nancy Crane, Tehmina Sacranie and Heather Mann	Precious Ramotswe, owner and founder of The No. 1 Ladies' Detective Agency, takes on her first case – and a news secretary.	BBC Radio 4 Afternoon Play
17 September 2004	The Bone	Alexander McCall Smith	Claire Benedict	Precious Ramotswe, owner and founder of The No. 1 Ladies' Detective Agency, sets out to discover the truth about Nandira Patel's boyfriend and to solve the case of the mysterious bone.	BBC Radio 4 Afternoon Play
24 September 2004	The Maid	Alexander McCall Smith	Claire Benedict	Mma Ramotswe, owner and founder of The No. 1 Ladies' Detective Agency, has good news. However, she must also face a scheming maid, find out the truth behind a doctor's erratic behaviour and take on a new case about a missing American.	BBC Radio 4 Afternoon Play
1 October 2004	Tears of the Giraffe	Alexander McCall Smith	Claire Benedict	Mr JLB Matekoni has a surprise for Mma Ramotswe, owner and founder of The No. 1 Ladies' Detective Agency. Meanwhile, the case of the missing American man has still to be solved.	BBC Radio 4 Afternoon Play
28 January 2005	Folie à Trois	Sarah Wooley	Eileen McCallum, Colette O'Neil, Molly Innes and Chris Young	Three women live together in an ordinary suburb in the West of Scotland. After a chance encounter with a street evangelist, the youngest decides not to face the 21st century and the threat of imminent apocalypse, and sets out to persuade the others to join her. But how will they do it and what happens if one of them changes her mind?	BBC Radio 4 Friday Play
30 August 2005	The Chief Justice of Beauty	Alexander McCall Smith	Claire Benedict	Precious Ramotswe, owner and founder of The No 1 Ladies' Detective Agency, is worried about her fiancé, Mr J L B Matekoni. Meanwhile, Mma Makutsi takes on a case for the Chief Justice of Beauty.	BBC Radio 4 Afternoon Play
6 September 2005	The Confession	Alexander McCall Smith	Claire Benedict and Joseph Marcell	Precious Ramotswe, owner and founder of The No. 1 Ladies' Detective Agency, has to find two women wronged in the past by her client, Mr Molefelo.	BBC Radio 4 Afternoon Play
13 September 2005	The Kalahari Typing School for Men	Alexander McCall Smith	Claire Benedict	Precious Ramotswe, owner and founder of The No. 1 Ladies' Detective Agency, discovers that the agency has competition, and Mma Makutsi embarks on an entrepreneurial enterprise.	BBC Radio 4 Afternoon Play
20 September 2005	The Admirer	Alexander McCall Smith	Claire Benedict	Precious Ramotswe, owner and founder of The No. 1 Ladies' Detective Agency, makes an unhappy discovery and Mma Makutsi finds an admirer at the Kalahari Typing School for Men.	BBC Radio 4 Afternoon Play
18 December 2005 – 31 December 2005	The Razor's Edge	W Somerset Maugham dramatised by Ronald Frame	Nicholas Le Prevost, John Light, Megan Dodds, Edward Petherbridge, Sam Dale, Amerjit Deu, Paul Dinnen, Philip Fox, Laurel Lefkow, Carolyn Pickles and David Bannerman	Young veteran Larry Darrell returns to Chicago after the First World War, and finds it difficult to fit back into society. To the dismay of his fiancé, Isabel he heads for Paris where he embarks on a spiritual quest to find the answers to his many questions.	BBC Radio 4 Classic Serial
1 January 2008	There Is No Such Thing as Free Food	Alexander McCall Smith	Claire Benedict, Nadine Marshall, Ben Onwukwe, Janice Acquah, Jude Akuwudike, Ayesha Antoine, Sam Dale, Maynard Eziashi, Gbemisola Ikumelo, Paterson Joseph and Kedar Williams-Stirling	Precious Ramotswe, owner and founder of The No. 1 Ladies' Detective Agency, is preoccupied both professionally and personally by the subject of food.	BBC Radio 4 Afternoon Play
2 January 2008	The Best Profession for a Blackmailer	Alexander McCall Smith	Claire Benedict, Nadine Marshall, Janice Acquah, Maynard Eziashi, Adjoa Andoh, Paterson Joseph and Alibe Parsons	Mr Polopetsi, part-time mechanic and would-be assistant detective, takes on a case of his own. Mma Makutsi finds out whether blue shoes are the key to happiness.	BBC Radio 4 Afternoon Play
3 January 2008	A Very Rude Woman	Alexander McCall Smith	Claire Benedict, Nadine Marshall, Janice Acquah, Ben Onwukwe, Adjoa Andoh, Noma Dumezweni, Maynard Eziashi, Chuk Iwuji, Paterson Joseph and Alibe Parsons	Precious Ramotswe faces change at the agency while Mr J L B Matekoni meets the rudest person in Botswana.	BBC Radio 4 Afternoon Play
4 January 2008	Talking Shoes	Alexander McCall Smith	Claire Benedict, Nadine Marshall, Ben Onwukwe, Janice Acquah, Adjoa Andoh, Anna Bengo, Noma Dumezweni, William Gaminara, Chuk Iwuji, Paterson Joseph, Naomi Taylor and Ben Thomas	A new detective takes on a case for the agency while Mma Ramotswe, among others, has a problem with high blood pressure.	BBC Radio 4 Afternoon Play
29 August 2008	They Have Oak Trees in North Carolina	Sarah Wooley	Alexander Morton, Ellie Haddington, Simon Harrison, Kenny Blyth and Gayanne Potter	In 1986, Ray and Eileen's five-year-old son Patrick vanishes in Florida. Twenty two years later, a good-looking American named Clay arrives in their small village, claiming to be their missing son.	BBC Radio 4 Friday Play
25 December 2008	The Miracle at Speedy Motors	Alexander McCall Smith	Claire Benedict, Nadine Marshall, Ben Onwukwe, Janice Acquah, Jude Akuwudike, Adjoa Andoh, Anna Bengo, Noma Dumezweni, Maynard Eziashi, Emmanuel Ighodaro, Chuk Iwuji and Alibe Parsons	Precious Ramotswe, owner and founder of The No. 1 Ladies' Detective Agency, is preoccupied – by the absence of postboxes in Botswana, by an anonymous letter and by an adopted child's poignant search for her true family. Meanwhile, Mr JLB Matekoni pursues an expensive cure for their foster daughter Motholeli.	BBC Radio 4 Afternoon Play
2 December 2010	An Exceptionally Wicked Lady	Alexander McCall Smith	Janice Acquah, Nadine Marshall, Ben Onwukwe, Sam Dale, Jude Akuwudike, Maynard Eziashi, Anna Bengo, Noma Dumezweni, Adjoa Andoh, Babou Ceesay and Nyasha Hatendi	Mma Ramotswe and Mma Makutsi face an old adversary while a letter from America sets the agency a seemingly impossible task.	BBC Radio 4 Afternoon Play
3 December 2010	Canoeing for Ladies	Alexander McCall Smith	Janice Acquah, Nadine Marshall, Ben Onwukwe, Maynard Eziashi, Nyasha Hatendi, Obi Abili, Chuk Iwuji, Jude Akuwudike, Anna Bengo, Noma Dumezweni and Adjoa Andoh	Mma Ramotswe and Mma Makutsi have to face the dangers of crocodiles, hippos and a tiny canoe as their case takes them to the Okovango Delta to trace a safari guide. There is also the problem of Phuti's aunt to solve, as well as the necessity of confronting their old adversary, Violet Sepotho.	BBC Radio 4 Afternoon Play
25 April 2011 – 29 April 2011	Out of Africa	Karen Blixen dramatised by Judith Adams	Emma Fielding, Tom Goodman-Hill, Beru Tessema, Maynard Eziashi and Sean Baker	Soon after Karen Blixen relocates to British East Africa, she finds herself alone in a foreign land with the enormous responsibility of trying to operate a successful coffee plantation. To accomplish this, she must get to know the land and the locals who work for and with her. In the process, she learns more about herself.	BBC Radio 4 Woman's Hour Drama
6 September 2011	Occupation	Andy Macdonald	Alexander Morton, Sally Reid, Brian Ferguson and Tracy Wiles	A fifty-year-old factory employee finds his own way to make a stand. With orders still on the books, Kenny Gall refuses to leave the factory he has worked in for more than thirty years.	BBC Radio 4 Afternoon Play
3 November 2011	A Late Van Just Glimpsed	Alexander McCall Smith	Claire Benedict, Nadine Marshall, Ben Onwukwe, Janice Acquah, Adjoa Andoh, Maynard Eziashi and Nyasha Hatendi	Mma Ramotswe makes a ghostly sighting and there is disturbing news about Charlie, Mr JLB Matekoni's wayward apprentice and the ladies investigate unexplained, violent attacks on cattle. Meanwhile, preparations are underway for Mma Makutsi's wedding to Phuti Radiphuti, but tragedy awaits outside the shoe shop.	BBC Radio 4 Afternoon Play
4 November 2011	The Saturday Big Tent Wedding	Alexander McCall Smith	Claire Benedict, Nadine Marshall, Ben Onwukwe, Janice Acquah, Adjoa Andoh, Maynard Eziashi, Nyasha Hatendi, Obi Abili, Beru Tessema, Jude Akuwudike and Gbemisola Ikumelo	The ladies solve the case of the murdered cattle. Mma Makutsi is feeling anxious about her upcoming wedding to Phuti Radiphuti and an old friend comes to the rescue. And Charlie is let off the hook.	BBC Radio 4 Afternoon Play
23 November 2011	Happy Hour at the Hotel Death	Colin Hough	Ralph Riach, Ann Louise Ross, Sean Scanlan and Ann Scott-Jones	Fed up with their loveless marriages, septuagenarians Avril and Nettie suggest a swinging holiday to their respective spouses. Tam and Boaby respond by planning the holiday of a lifetime.	BBC Radio Scotland Drama
6 May 2012 – 13 May 2012	The Great Gatsby	F Scott Fitzgerald dramatised by Robert Forrest	Bryan Dick, Andrew Scott, Andrew Buchan, Pippa Bennett-Warner, Melody Grove, Karl Johnson, Sam Dale, Gerard McDermott, Susie Riddell, Tracy Wiles, Patrick Brennan, Christine Absalom and Amaka Okafor	F Scott Fitzgerald's seminal novel, a portrait of the Jazz Age in all of its decadence and excess, is perhaps the greatest book on the fallibility of the American dream. Nick Carraway arrives in Long Island and is reacquainted with his distant cousin, Daisy Buchanan. He falls in with her wealthy crowd. His neighbour, the self-made and self-invented millionaire, Gatsby, is the man who has everything – but one thing will always be out of his reach.	BBC Radio 4 Classic Serial
23 September 2012	Mary Stuart	Friedrich Schiller translated by David Harrower & adapted by Robin Brooks	Meg Fraser, Alexandra Mathie, Matthew Pidgeon, Robin Laing, Richard Greenwood, Paul Young, Wendy Seagar, Jimmy Chisholm, Laurie Brown, Grant O'Rourke and John Buick	One of European theatre's major plays, Friedrich Schiller's Mary Stuart is a thrilling account of the extraordinary and tempestuous relationship between England's Elizabeth I and her rival cousin, the imprisoned Queen of Scots.	BBC Radio 3 Drama on 3
20 March 2013	A Man from a Far Place	Alexander McCall Smith	Claire Benedict, Nadine Marshall, Ben Onwukwe, Maynard Eziashi, Beru Tessema, Janice Acquah, Babou Ceesay, Sam Dale, Eleanor Crooks and Jude Akuwudike	Mma Ramotswe and Mma Makutsi receive a visit from an extremely important person – a hero, as it happens, of the two detectives at the No.1 Ladies' Detective Agency. Mma Potokwani has had bad news at the Orphan Farm. And one of Mr J.L.B. Matekoni's apprentices, Fanwell, gets himself into deep water.	BBC Radio 4 Afternoon Play
21 March 2013	The Limpopo Academy of Private Detection	Alexander McCall Smith	Claire Benedict, Nadine Marshall, Ben Onwukwe, Janice Acquah, Maynard Eziashi, Beru Tessema, Sam Dale, Obi Abili, Adjoa Andoh, Nyasha Hatendi, Jude Akuwudike and Babou Ceesay	Mma Ramotswe and Mma Makutsi have received a visit from an extremely important person – a hero of the two detectives at the No.1 Ladies' Detective Agency. Mma Potokwani has had bad news at the Orphan Farm and the ladies are determined to help her. And Mr J.L.B. Matekoni sets out to clear the name of his apprentice, Fanwell.	BBC Radio 4 Afternoon Play
29 January 2014	Albion Street	Oliver Emanuel	Robin Laing and Meg Fraser	Jamie and Kirsty have been separated for about 10 years. Before that they were married for about 10 years. They meet by chance in a restaurant in Albion Street. What does the future hold? Are they better together or apart?	BBC Radio Scotland Drama
26 August 2013 – 30 August 2013	The True Story of Bonnie Parker	Beatrice Colin	Melody Grove, Finn den Hertog, Robin Laing, Liam Brennan, James Anthony Pearson and Rosalind Sydney	Having dropped out of high school and married at 16, the young Bonnie Parker is working as a waitress. Her life is about to change – when she meets Clyde Barrow.	BBC Radio 4; 15 Minute Drama
2 February 2015 – 6 February 2015	The Ice Wife	Beatrice Colin	Claire Rushbrook, Steven Cree, Pippa Bennett-Warner, Ian Conningham and Sam Dale	Tensions are running high on the skeleton over-wintering crew on an Antarctic base – but why?	BBC Radio 4; 15 Minute Drama
4 August 2016	This Is Not a Rubbish Boy	Alexander McCall Smith	Claire Benedict, Nadine Marshall, Ben Onwukwe, Steve Toussaint, Kai Francis-Lewis, Janice Acquah and Eleanor Crooks	Mma Ramotswe has to come to terms with one of the most difficult situations that she has ever faced – taking a holiday.	BBC Radio 4 Afternoon Play
5 August 2016	The Woman Who Walked in Sunshine	Alexander McCall Smith	Claire Benedict, Nadine Marshall, Ben Onwukwe, Steve Toussaint, Janice Acquah, Jason Barnett and Clare Perkins	Mma Ramotswe is technically on holiday from the Agency but that does not stop her from stepping in to rescue an orphaned boy, or from taking on an important case.	BBC Radio 4 Afternoon Play
19 July 2017	The Fat Cattle Club	Alexander McCall Smith	Janice Acquah, Nadine Marshall, Ben Onwukwe, Steve Toussaint and Sarah Niles		BBC Radio 4 Afternoon Play
20 July 2017	Precious and Grace	Alexander McCall Smith	Janice Acquah, Nadine Marshall, Ben Onwukwe, Steve Toussaint and Sarah Niles		BBC Radio 4 Afternoon Play
1 December 2017	The Ferryman’s Apprentice	Beatrice Colin	Gary Lewis, Chris O'Reilly, Rosalind Sydney and Tom Smith	Charon is the Ferryman on the river Acheron. His job is to ferry sinners across the river of woe and decide into which circle of Hell they should go. His son, Thomas, is determined to pursue a different career.	BBC Radio 4 Afternoon Drama
14 January 2018	The Vital Spark: The Driver’s Seat	Muriel Spark dramatised by Beatrice Colin	Shauna Macdonald, Alexandra Mathie, Robert Jack, Robin Laing, Cesare Taurasi, Georgie Glen, Alasdair Hankinson and Karen Bartke	Lise, an enigmatic young woman travelling alone to a European city in search of "the one". We assume that she is seeking a lover but in fact she is searching for the man who will murder her.	BBC Radio 4
22 January 2018	4/4: Introduction and Allegro	Robin Brooks	Alasdair Hankinson, Simon Donaldson, Robin Laing, Shauna Macdonald, Karen Bartke, Nick Underwood, Kenny Blyth and the Edinburgh Quartet	A new comedy drama series about the exploits – musical and otherwise – of a string quartet.	BBC Radio 4 Afternoon Drama
29 January 2018	4/4: Scherzo	Sarah Wooley	Alasdair Hankinson, Simon Donaldson, Robin Laing, Shauna Macdonald, Karen Bartke, Kenny Blyth and the Edinburgh Quartet	The Benjamin Quartet, with their new First Violin Paul, has played to a tiny audience in Brussels, where Fergus has been taken ill with a suspected heart attack.	BBC Radio 4 Afternoon Drama
5 February 2018	4/4: Rondo Mysterioso	Robin Brooks	Alasdair Hankinson, Simon Donaldson, Robin Laing, Shauna Macdonald, Karen Bartke, Nick Underwood, Kenny Blyth, Finlay Welsh and the Edinburgh Quartet	After a difficult night in a Brussels A and E, the Benjamin Quartet has been invited to play at a festival in Lucca. What could go wrong?	BBC Radio 4 Afternoon Drama
12 February 2018	4/4: Finale Con Porca	Sarah Wooley	Alasdair Hankinson, Simon Donaldson, Robin Laing, Shauna Macdonald, Karen Bartke, Laurie Brown, Kyle Gardiner and the Edinburgh Quartet	After playing in a festival in Lucca, the quartet is on its way home when they receive a new booking. Fergus has invited Kelly, a young Australian woman, to travel with them. Could things be beginning to go right for the Benjamin Quartet?	BBC Radio 4 Afternoon Drama
1 June 2018	The Poet and the Echo: Grey Evening	Beatrice Colin	Read by Cal MacAninch	An achromatic artist is exposed in this witty story inspired by D H Lawrence's poem.	BBC Radio 4

Sources:

- Gaynor Macfarlane's radio play listing at RadioListings website

== Theatre ==
Stage Plays Directed by Gaynor Macfarlane
Date	Title	Author	Cast	Synopsis	Theatre Company	Notes
November 1996	Burdalane	Judith Adams	Nick Fletcher, Lorraine Hilton, Dean McGuirn, Jamie Roberts, Isobel Middleton, Tracy Wiles, Lyn Christie, Rose Keegan, Kate Laurie, Raewyn Lippert, Michael Larkin and Lawrence Crawford	On a voyage to the remote island of St. Kilda in the 18th century, Alexander Carlisle, a scientist, is going to check the condition of a mad woman. Only she's not mad, she's angry. The woman in question is Rachel Erskine, Lady Grange, whose husband has declared her dead, staged an elegant Edinburgh funeral marred solely by the second Lady Grange's attendance, and shipped her off to St. Kilda to rot.	Battersea Arts Centre One Horse Productions	"Burdalane's strength derives from Judith Adams' script (an outstanding first play) and Gaynor McFarlane's direction, which together bring to life a strange matriarchal society. It's enough to give historical drama a good name." Adrian Turpin, The Independent
28 May 1997 – 28 June 1997	The Birds	Aristophanes		Two disillusioned people go to live among their feathered friends	Gate Theatre	
3 December 1997 – 21 December 1997	The House of Desires	Sor Juana Inés de la Cruz adapted by Peter Oswald		17th century Mexican comedy in which five people, madly in love with one another, are locked up in one house.	Battersea Arts Centre One Horse Productions	
1 March 2003 – 29 April 2003	Wit	Margaret Edson	Alexandra Mathie, Jonathan Battersby, James Mackenzie, Molly Innes, Joanna Tope, Natalie Bennet, Chris Young and Jessica Richards	The last hours of Dr Vivian Bearing, a university professor of English, dying of ovarian cancer.	Touring: Tron Theatre, Glasgow; Plockton Village Hall, Plockton; Aros Theatre, Isle of Skye; Aultbea Community Hall, Aultbea; Macphail Centre, Ullapool; Ardross Community Hall, Ardross; Eden Court Theatre, Inverness; Adam Smith Theatre, Kirkcaldy; Maltings Arts Centre, Berwick-upon-Tweed; Falkirk Town Hall, Falkirk; Macroberts Arts Centre, Stirling; Lochside Theatre, Castle Douglas; Theatre Royal, Dumfries; North Edinburgh Arts Centre, Pilton; Byre Theatre, St Andrews; Brunton Theatre, Musselburgh; Traverse Theatre, Edinburgh; Stellar Quines Theatre Company	"One of the most satisfying and enjoyable evenings of drama Scottish Theatre has produced for a while." (The Scotsman) Alexandra Mathie was awarded the Critics Award for Theatre in Scotland for Best Actress.
3 November 2004	Folie à Trois	Sarah Wooley	Eileen McCallum, Colette O'Neil, Molly Innes and Chris Young	Three women live together in an ordinary suburban street in the West of Scotland. After a chance encounter with a street evangelist, the three decide to make a suicide pact rather than face the 21st century and the threat of imminent apocalypse. But how will they do it and what happens if one of them changes her mind? They also decide to keep the curtains open in case they miss the spectacle of cosmic disintegration.	Traverse Theatre, Edinburgh Stellar Quines Theatre Company	In collaboration with BBC Radio 4 – see Folie à Trois broadcast on 28 January 2005
23 June 2005	The Past is not a Place	Beatrice Colin		When three female journalists arrive at a health spa on an isolated island, they expect a few days of relaxing detoxification. But this is no ordinary holiday destination, as they quickly discover. As lust, regret and betrayal all threaten to crack their fragile equilibrium, the women come face to face with what brought them there and why.	Traverse Theatre, Edinburgh Stellar Quines Theatre Company	
30 June 2005	The Past is not a Place	Beatrice Colin		When three female journalists arrive at a health spa on an isolated island, they expect a few days of relaxing detoxification. But this is no ordinary holiday destination, as they quickly discover. As lust, regret and betrayal all threaten to crack their fragile equilibrium, the women come face to face with what brought them there and why.	Tron Theatre, Glasgow Stellar Quines Theatre Company	
