= Beatrice Colin =

British novelist and radio dramatist (1963–2019)

- Born: October 14, 1963; London, England
- Died: February 6, 2019 (aged 55); Glasgow, Scotland
- Occupations: Novelist; Radio dramatist Lecturer
- Known for: Novelist, radio dramatist and senior lecturer in creative writing
- Spouses: Ewan Morrison; Paul Harkin

Beatrice Colin (14 October 1963 – 6 February 2019) was a British novelist, radio dramatist, and senior lecturer in creative writing at the University of Strathclyde.

== Early life ==
Beatrice Colin was born in London on 14 October 1963. Her family moved to Lancashire and then to Glasgow, where she attended Dumbarton Academy and Park School for Girls, followed by the University of Glasgow in 1982, where she read English. There she formed the musical duo April Showers with Jonathan Bernstein – their single "Abandon Ship" reached 144 in the UK singles charts.

== Career ==
After graduating from the University of Glasgow, she worked as a journalist for the arts and features pages of publications including The Scotsman, Sunday Herald and The Guardian.

In her late twenties, she won a Radio 4 short story competition and started writing radio plays and adaptations. She was in a relationship with Love & Money singer James Grant and sang backing vocals on their album Strange Kind of Love (1988).

She completed her PhD in creative writing at the University of Strathclyde in 2008.

== Novels ==
- Nude, Untitled, 2001
  — shortlisted for the Saltire First Book Award
- Disappearing Act, 2002
- The Luminous Life of Lilly Aphrodite (UK title), 2008
  The Glimmer Palace (US title), 2007
  — Recommended by the Richard & Judy Book Club, 2009
- The Songwriter, 2010
  New York 1916, 2011 (Italian translation)
- To Capture What We Cannot Keep, 2016
- The Glass House, 2020

=== Short stories ===
- "The Suffragette’s Party"
- "Toad"
- "Grey Evening"

=== For children ===
- My Invisible Sister with Sara Pinto, 2010 (made into the film Invisible Sister by Disney TV)
- Pyrate’s Boy, 2013 (as E B Colin)

== Radio plays ==
Radio plays written by Beatrice Colin
Date first broadcast	Play	Director	Cast	Synopsis Awards	Station Series
18 September 1995	Bear Junction	Patrick Rayner	Read by Siobhan Redmond	Miss Colleen learns to drive with the intriguingly mysterious Mr Podstovski. She isn't a very good pupil – but then he isn't a very good teacher.	BBC Radio 4 Short Story
18 April 1996	The Electric Angel	Patrick Rayner	Liam Brennan, Deirdre Davis, Anne Kristen, Louise Ironside, Mark Cox, Margaret Clark and Owen Kavanagh	Set in about 1968, when the Apollo space missions were in the news. A young man from Oban comes to the big city to find work, and falls for a girl he meets...	BBC Radio 4
28 January 1998	Camisole	Bruce Young	Read by Tamara Kennedy	Penny was once the type of child who used to hide between her mother's fur coats. She stroked them like huge affectionate pets in the dark of the wardrobe. Now Penny runs a vintage clothing shop where she becomes intrigued by a regular customer called Mr Jamaica.	BBC Radio 4 Short Story
9 April 1998	The Maids of Orleans	Patrick Rayner	Eliza Langland, Kathryn Howden, Emma Currie and Michael Perceval-Maxwell	Set in France during the second World War. As the Germans advance, three women escape to a chateau in the Loire valley.	BBC Radio 4 Afternoon Play
26 January 2000	The Rocks Below	Gaynor Macfarlane	Deirdre Davis, Mairl Gillespie, Derek McGhie, Gayanne Potter, Simon Tait and Paul Young	On a small Scottish island in the 1950s, identical twins are forced by the imminent death of their father to confront a secret.	BBC Radio 4 Afternoon Play
10 March 2000	Mercury, Sulphur and Salt	Patrick Rayner	Mark McDonnell, Vicki Liddelle, Eliza Langland, James Bryce, Crawford Logan, Jimmy Chlsholm and Ronald Simon	Based on real events in 1527 Basel, in a shabby garret the famous physician Paracelsus and his mistress Sybille crouch over a crucible. Their life-or-death experiment is reaching the final stage, but outside in the winter night a search party is drawing ever nearer.	BBC Radio 4 The Friday Play
23 October 2000 – 3 November 2000	The Weight of Water; Dramatisation of Anita Shreve novel	Gaynor Macfarlane	Nancy Crane, Derbhle Crotty, Emma Fielding, Karl Johnson, Page Marshall, Isobel Middleton, Stuart Milligan and Simon Scardlfleld	On the night of 5 March 1873, two women, both Norwegian emigrants, were murdered on the Isles of Shoals. In the present day, a newspaper photographer discovers a cache of papers that appear to give an eyewitness account of the murders.	BBC Radio 4 Woman's Hour Drama
20 March 2003	King of Shadows; Dramatisation of Susan Cooper novel	Gaynor Macfarlane	Buffy Davis, Sally Dexter, Tom George, Robert Glenister, Martin Hyder, Adam Sims and Andrew Woodall	A magical adventure story set both in the present day and in Elizabethan England. Chosen to play Puck in a production of A Midsummer Night's Dream at Shakespeare's Globe, young American Nat Field travels to London. Visiting the theatre for the first time, he falls seriously ill. When he awakes, he finds that he has gone back 400 years in time.	BBC Radio 4 Afternoon Play
4 May 2003 – 11 May 2003	Precious Bane; Dramatisation of Mary Webb novel	Gaynor Macfarlane	Louise Breckon-Richards, Laura Doddington, Owen Teale, Julia Ford, Tom Goodman-Hill, Helen Schlesinger, Maggie Steed, Nigel Terry and Timothy Watson	Prue Sam is born "hare shotten" and it is this hare lip that is her "precious bane". She is torn between loyalty to her recklessly ambitious brother, Gideon, and a deep unexpressed love for the weaver Kester Woodseaves.	BBC Radio 4 Classic Serial
30 January 2004	Mapping the Heart	Gaynor Macfarlane	Gayanne Potter, Stuart Milligan, Monica Gibb, Paul Young and Lewis Howden	An adventure story set in 1950 in the Brazilian rainforest. Scots-born Kristina Morrison is thrown together with opinionated American Ray Epstein when their light aircraft crashes in the jungle. Kristina finds herself torn between two men: Ray and her explorer father Felix.	BBC Radio 4 Afternoon Play
25 August 2006	The January Wedding	Lu Kemp	Karl Johnson, Cressida Trew, Richard Katz, Susan Engel and Sam Dale	In 1969 a landmark court case was brought in the UK. A young Polish woman petitioned for her marriage to an elderly Warsaw academic to be annulled. The annulment was granted on the basis that the marriage had taken place under duress. He had married her to save her from imprisonment under the Polish communist regime.	BBC Radio 4 Afternoon Play
22 March 2011	Census 2011: The Suffragette's Party	Eilidh McCreadie	Read by Melody Grove	A story about principles and protest as a woman risks the wrath of her family by gathering with fellow suffragettes on census night 1911.	BBC Radio 4 Afternoon Reading
26 August 2013 – 30 August 2013	The True Story of Bonnie Parker	Gaynor Macfarlane	Melody Grove, Finn den Hertog, Robin Laing, Liam Brennan, James Anthony Pearson and Rosalind Sydney	Having dropped out of high school and married at 16, the young Bonnie Parker is working as a waitress. Her life is about to change – when she meets Clyde Barrow.	BBC Radio 4; 15 Minute Drama
2 February 2015 – 6 February 2015	The Ice Wife	Gaynor Macfarlane	Claire Rushbrook, Steven Cree, Pippa Bennett-Warner, Ian Conningham and Sam Dale	Tensions are running high on the skeleton over-wintering crew on an Antarctic base – but why?	BBC Radio 4; 15 Minute Drama
1 December 2017	The Ferryman’s Apprentice	Gaynor Macfarlane	Gary Lewis, Chris O'Reilly, Rosalind Sydney and Tom Smith	Charon is the Ferryman on the river Acheron. His job is to ferry sinners across the river of woe and decide into which circle of Hell they should go. His son, Thomas, is determined to pursue a different career.	BBC Radio 4 Afternoon Drama
14 January 2018	The Vital Spark: The Driver’s Seat; Dramatisation of Muriel Spark novel	Gaynor Macfarlane	Shauna Macdonald, Alexandra Mathie, Robert Jack, Robin Laing, Cesare Taurasi, Georgie Glen, Alasdair Hankinson and Karen Bartke	Lise, an enigmatic young woman travelling alone to a European city in search of "the one". We assume that she is seeking a lover but in fact she is searching for the man who will murder her.	BBC Radio 4
1 June 2018	The Poet and the Echo: Grey Evening	Gaynor Macfarlane	Read by Cal MacAninch	An achromatic artist is exposed in this witty story inspired by D H Lawrence's poem.	BBC Radio 4

== Theatre ==
Stage plays written by Beatrice Colin
Date	Title	Director	Cast	Synopsis	Theatre Company
23 June 2005	The Past is not a Place	Gaynor Macfarlane		When three female journalists arrive at a health spa on an isolated island, they expect a few days of relaxing detoxification. But this is no ordinary holiday destination, as they quickly discover. As lust, regret and betrayal all threaten to crack their fragile equilibrium, the women come face to face with what brought them there and why.	Traverse Theatre, Edinburgh; Stellar Quines Theatre Company
30 June 2005	The Past is not a Place	Gaynor Macfarlane		When three female journalists arrive at a health spa on an isolated island, they expect a few days of relaxing detoxification. But this is no ordinary holiday destination, as they quickly discover. As lust, regret and betrayal all threaten to crack their fragile equilibrium, the women come face to face with what brought them there and why.	Tron Theatre, Glasgow; Stellar Quines Theatre Company

== Film ==
- Invisible Sister, 2015 Disney Channel Original Movie based on the book My Invisible Sister
- The Hide, 2017 short film

== Personal life ==
Colin married Ewan Morrison in 1996; the couple had two children, Theo in 1998 and Frances in 2001. Their marriage ended in 2003.

She met Paul Harkin, a lecturer, in 2008; they married in 2016.

Colin was diagnosed with ovarian cancer in 2016, from which she died in 2019 aged 55.
