= Steven McNicoll =

Scottish actor, director, playwright, and television presenter

- Born: 13 December 1970 (age 55); Edinburgh, Scotland
- Occupations: Actor, playwright, comedian, television presenter

Steven McNicoll is a Scottish actor, director, playwright and television presenter.

He co-wrote and starred in seven series of the BBC sketch show Velvet Soup on radio and later television, which earned him a BAFTA nomination.

He is also known to viewers for playing the young Rab C. Nesbitt in the series of the same name which stars Gregor Fisher. He also appears regularly as Bra's Jeff in Donald McLeary and Sanjeev Kohli's Sony Award winning BBC Radio 4 sitcom Fags, Mags and Bags.

McNicoll has also presented 4 series of the educational programme Around Scotland for the BBC.

McNicoll has co written several plays for stage and radio. In 2001, his play for BBC Radio 4, There Are Such Things, about the life and career of horror movie legend, Bela Lugosi, won the Hamilton Deane Award for best dramatic presentation from the Dracula Society. Prior to that, in 1997, as writer and actor, McNicoll was a recipient of The Herald Angel Award for his stage play Empty Jesters.

In 2003, he received the Leon Sinden Award for best supporting actor in Tony Roper's classic comedy/drama The Steamie. In 2005, he received plaudits for his portrayal of Oliver Hardy opposite Barnaby Power in the Tom McGrath play Laurel and Hardy, which was first performed at the Royal Lyceum Theatre Edinburgh and later transferred to the Olympia Theatre Dublin. The same year he was nominated for best supporting actor at the Theatrical Management Association awards for his portrayal of Cliff, opposite David Tennant as Jimmy Porter in Look Back in Anger which premiered at the Royal Lyceum Theatre and then transferred to the Theatre Royal, Bath.

In 2005, Scottish cultural magazine The List nominated him at number 69 in their Hot 100 List which celebrated those who had made the biggest cultural impact in Scotland that year. In 2007, he starred as Sammy Fox in the critically acclaimed BBC TV comedy series Legit, which was nominated for a Rose d'Or.

On stage, McNicoll has appeared in a huge variety of roles.

In 2009, McNicoll starred along with Gordon Kennedy Colin McCredie and Sara Crowe in Tim Firth's comedy musical The Corstorphine Road Nativity at The Festival Theatre.

In November 2010, McNicoll's play The House was premiered at Òran Mór in Glasgow.

In 2011, he played Toby Belch in Twelfth Night and in 2012, David O. Selznick in Moonlight and Magnolias in two hugely successful productions directed by Rachel O'Riordan in her debut season at Perth Theatre. Later that same year he was a recipient of The Argos Angel award for his performances in Paddy Cunneen's Fleeto and Wee Andy at the Brighton Festival.

McNicoll has also appeared regularly at the Kings Theatre, Glasgow in the annual Christmas pantomime.

On radio, he has worked extensively for the BBC for over thirty years, starting as a child actor, then progressing to writing and acting in plays and series for Radio 3 and 4. In July 2012, he could be heard as Pa Joad opposite Michelle Fairley in a three part Radio 4 Classic Serial adaptation of John Steinbeck's The Grapes of Wrath. And with Brian Cox in episodes of McLevy.

In April 2013, he co-starred With Johnny Watson and Gail Watson in Rob Drummond's play Quiz Show that launched The Traverse Theatre's Fiftieth Anniversary Season.

In 2016, he starred with Freddie Fox in the comedy horror short The Northleach Horror directed by David Cairns.

In 2017, he played Biesenthal in Marathon Man with Ian McDiarmid for Radio 4.

McNicoll is familiar to younger audiences as the teacher Mr Mackie in the much loved BBC TV version of Katie Morag. And his numerous appearances in the hugely popular Teacup Travels. Most recently he has starred as Bob in the BAFTA nominated CBeebies series Molly and Mack. The show ran for four successful series and a fifth series has just been commissioned to start filming in 2022.

He has recently appeared as an interviewer as part of Ian Lavender's Dad's Army reminiscence show "Don't tell him Pike!" which played to full houses at the Edinburgh Festival Fringe at the Assembly Rooms.

He starred as Jean at the Royal Lyceum in Murat Daltaban's DOT theatre company's acclaimed production of Zinnie Harris' adaptation of Ionesco's Rhinoceros as part of the Edinburgh International Festival in 2017.

== Selected stage appearances ==
Year	Play/Theatre	Role	Notes
2025	The Seagull, Lyceum Theatre, Edinburgh	Shamrayev	Mike Poulton's adaptation of the play by Anton Chekhov
2022	A Christmas Carol, Lyceum Theatre, Edinburgh	Mr Fezziwig / Nouadays	
2018	The Belle's Stratagem, Lyceum Theatre, Edinburgh	Provost Hardy, Phillip, Gibson	Tony Cownie's adaptation of Hannah Cowley's play
2017	Rhinoceros, Lyceum Theatre, Edinburgh	Jean	
2014	Kill Johnny Glendenning, Lyceum Theatre, Edinburgh	Bruce	play by D.C. Jackson
2013	The Shawshank Redemption, Assembly Rooms/The Gaiety, Dublin	Brian Hadley	
2013	Quiz Show, Traverse Theatre, Edinburgh	Gerry Holland	Winner: Best New Play Critic's Award for Theatre 2013
2012	Pygmalion, Òran Mór, Glasgow	Henry Higgins	
2012	Fleeto, Tumult in the Clouds	DCI Martin Booth	Winner: Argos Angel Award Brighton Festival
2012	Wee Andy, Tumult in the Clouds	Andrew Graham	Winner: Argos Angel Award Brighton Festival
2012	Moonlight and Magnolias, Perth Theatre	David O Selznick	
2011	Twelfth Night, Perth Theatre	Sir Toby Belch	
2011	Educating Agnes, Lyceum Theatre, Edinburgh	Hamish	
2010	While You Lie, Traverse Theatre, Edinburgh	Chris	
2010	The Importance of Being Earnest, Lyceum Theatre, Edinburgh	Merriman/Lane	play by Oscar Wilde
2007	The Merchant of Venice, Lyceum Theatre, Edinburgh	Gratiano	
2006	Look Back in Anger : 50 years, Royal Court	Cliff	play by John Osborne
2006	Joking Apart, Northcott Theatre	Sven	
2005	Laurel and Hardy, Lyceum Theatre, Edinburgh / Olympia Theatre Dublin	Oliver Hardy	play by Tom McGrath
2005	Look Back in Anger, Lyceum Theatre, Edinburgh / Theatre Royal Bath	Cliff	Nominated: T.M.A Best supporting actor
2004	Dead Funny, Borderline Theatre	Brian	
2003	Man and Superman / The Steamie / The Matchmaker, Pitlochry Festival Theatre	Hector Malone/ Andy/ Auguste	Winner: Leon Sinden Award Best Actor
2001	The Comedy of Errors, Lyceum Theatre, Edinburgh	Dromio of Syracuse	
1992	The Jesuit, Netherbow Theatre, Edinburgh	Watt	play by Donald Campbell

== Selected film and TV ==
Year	Title	Company	Role
2013	Katie Morag	BBC	Mr Mackie
2010	Garrow's Law	BBC	Yardley
2009	Joe Smeal's Wheels	Film Nouveau	Davie Bell
2008	Empty	BBC	Tam
2007	Legit	BBC	Sammy Fox
2006	Wearside Jack: The Ripper Hoaxer	Channel 4	DCI Dick Holland
2004	The Return of Peg Leg Pete	Fox Searchlight	Pete
2002	Cry For Bobo	Forged Film	Coco
2001	V'elvet Soup	BBC	Writer/ Performer
2000	Velvet Soup	BBC	Writer/ Performer
1994–2011	Rab C. Nesbitt	BBC	Young Rab C
1988	Shadow on the Earth	BBC Scotland	Derek Brogan

== Selected radio appearances ==
Date	Title	Role	Director	Station
31 May 1999	Let It Bleed		Gaynor Macfarlane	BBC Radio 4 Afternoon Play
25 May 2004	15 Minutes to Go: Viper in the Nest	Headmaster / Radio Announcer	Lu Kemp	BBC Radio 4 Woman's Hour Drama
31 March 2003	The Life Trainer	Chaz	Lu Kemp	BBC Radio 4 Afternoon Play
28 October 2003	The Time Between Two Tides	Loan Shark/Operator	Gaynor Macfarlane	BBC Radio 4 Afternoon Play
8 January 2004	Bampot Central	Constable McLaren	Lu Kemp	BBC Radio 3 The Wire
21 August 2008	Sex for Volunteers	Joe	Kirsty Williams	BBC Radio 4 Afternoon Play
24 December 2008	Christmas Eve	Vakula	Bruce Young	BBC Radio 4 Afternoon Play
23 July 2010	No Help When Dead	Baxter	Kirsty Williams	BBC Radio Scotland Drama
11 November 2012 – 18 November 2012	The Black Book	Mickey Rebus	Bruce Young	BBC Radio 4 Classic Serial
