= Muriel Romanes =

Scottish actress (born 1946)

Muriel Romanes MBE
- Born: Muriel Rose Romanes; 18 March 1946 (age 80); Cambridge, England
- Occupations: actress; stage director
- Years active: 1980–2015

Muriel Rose Romanes MBE (born 18 March 1946) is a Scottish former theatre, television and film actress and award-winning stage director. She is best known as a cast regular in the Scottish Television drama Take the High Road; and as the artistic director of the Stellar Quines Theatre Company in Edinburgh.

== Career ==
Born in Cambridge, Romanes began her acting career as a student at the Royal Scottish Academy of Music and Drama. Having worked in Scottish theatre for many years, she played the part of schoolteacher Miss Welch in Gregory's Girl (1981). In 1980, she joined the cast of Take the High Road and, until 1989, played the part of Alice Taylor (née McEwan), one of the programme's longest-running characters. Other television credits include An Englishman, an Irishman and a Scotsman (BBC), Schools (BBC) and Wallace Warbler (STV).

After leaving Take the High Road, Romanes returned to theatre, where she had many successes. She became an associate director at the Royal Lyceum Theatre in Edinburgh where she directed several acclaimed productions, including The Deep Blue Sea, A Listening Heaven, Lavender Blue, A Streetcar Named Desire, The Prime of Miss Jean Brodie, and Anna Karenina. In 1993, she was a founder member of the Stellar Quines Theatre Company in Edinburgh and, in 1996, became its first artistic director. Romanes held this post until she retired in 2015. Romanes was a frequent visiting lecturer and director at the Drama School of Edinburgh’s Queen Margaret University where she directed a number of productions.

== Theatre ==
Year	Title	Role	Company	Theatre	Director	Notes
1989 & 1990	The Guid Sisters	Pierette Guerin	The Tron Theatre Company	Tron Theatre, Glasgow	Michael Boyd	play by Michel Tremblay, translated into Scots by Bill Findlay and Martin Bowman
1989	Woman in Mind	Susan	Lyceum Theatre Company	Lyceum Theatre, Edinburgh	Hugh Hogart	play by Alan Ayckbourn
1991	The Bruce	Isabel, Countess of Buchan	Brunton Theatre Company	Brunton Theatre, Musselburgh	Charles Nowosielski	Edinburgh International Festival production of the play by Robert S. Silver
1992	The Jesuit	Lady Spottiswoode	Fifth Estate	Netherbow Theatre, Edinburgh	Allan Sharpe	play by Donald Campbell

Other theatre work includes touring with Jimmy Logan in For Love or Money: An Ideal Husband (Perth Rep), Schellenbreck (Netherbow), Deacon Brodie, Othersise Engaged, Dr. Angelus, The Tempest, Blythe Spirit, A View from the Bridge and The Marriage of Figaro (Lyceum Theatre, Edinburgh), We, Charles II and The Archive of Countess D. (Fifth Estate). In 1992, she assisted Allan Sharpe with his production of Trevor Royle's Buchan of Tweedsmuir and directed Lambrusco Nights for Fifth Estate.

== Honours ==
On 12 June 2016, following her retirement, the Critics' Awards for Theatre in Scotland (CATS) presented Romanes with the prestigious "CATS Whiskers" award for outstanding achievement "in supporting and strengthening women’s role in Scottish theatre", most notably as the first artistic director of Stellar Quines. She was appointed Member of the Order of the British Empire (MBE) in the 2016 Birthday Honours for services to drama.

== Bibliography ==
- Elder, Michael (1990). Ten Years of Take the High Road. London: Boxtree. ISBN 978-1-85283-109-7.
