= Jemima Levick =

British theatre director (born 1978)

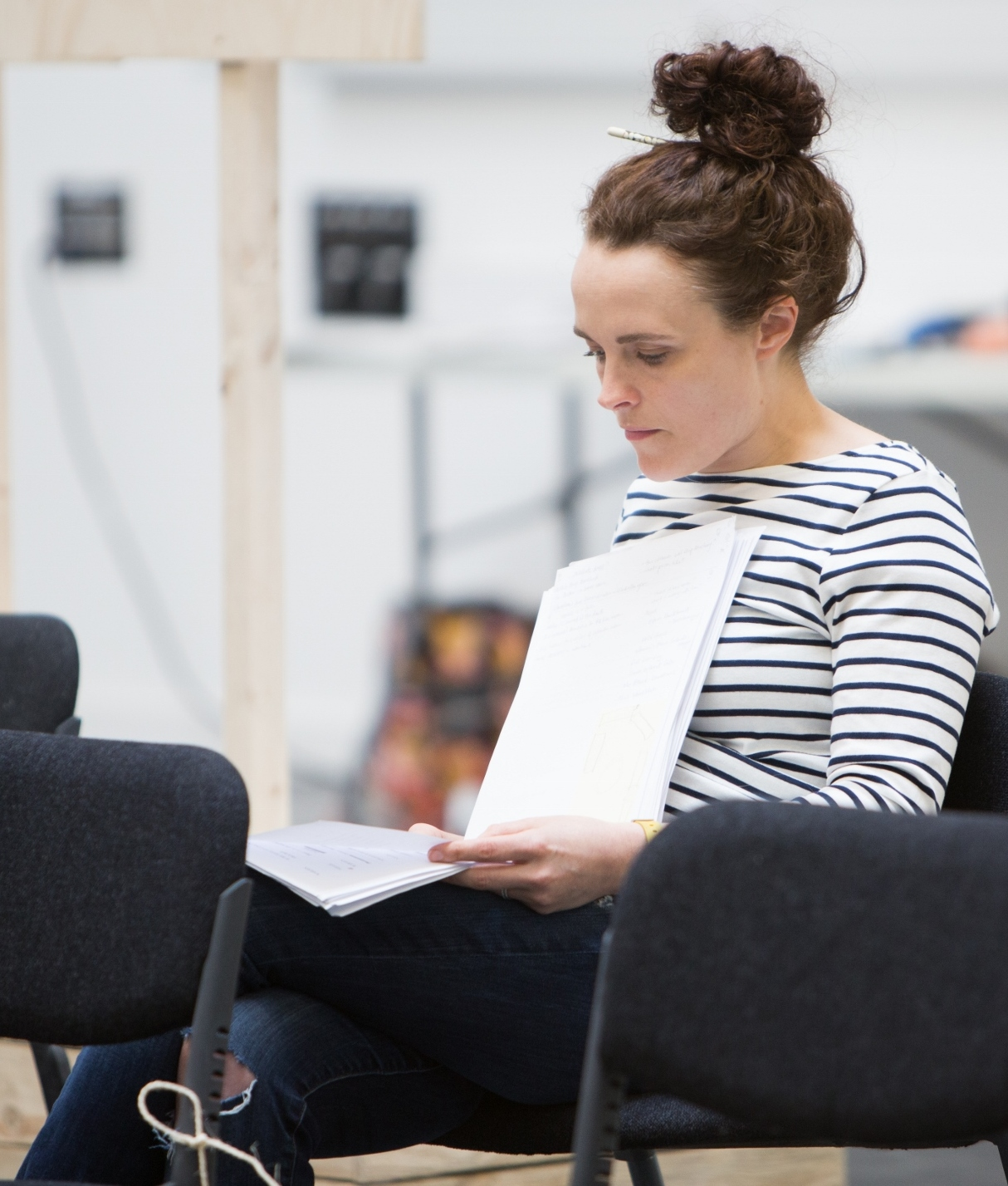
Levick in 2017

Jemima Levick (born 1978) is a British theatre director. From 2016 to 2021 she was artistic director of Edinburgh-based Stellar Quines Theatre Company, from 2021 - 2024 she was the Artistic Director of A Play, A Pie and A Pint at Òran Mór. In April 2024 she became the Artistic Director of the Tron Theatre in Glasgow.

Levick graduated with a BA (Hons) in Drama & Theatre Arts, specialising in Directing, from Edinburgh's Queen Margaret University School of Drama in 2002. She worked as a freelance director for Stellar Quines, the National Theatre of Scotland, the Traverse, Grid Iron, Bordeline and the Royal Lyceum Theatre before being appointed associate director at Dundee Rep in 2009. She became its artistic director until May 2016 when she became artistic director of the Stellar Quines Theatre Company, an Edinburgh-based women's theatre company.

In the Critics' Awards for Theatre in Scotland she was shortlisted as "best director" in 2005-06 for A Christmas Carol at the Royal Lyceum Theatre and in 2008-09 for Beauty and the Beast at Dundee Rep (this production also being shortlisted as "Best production for children and young people"), and in 2009-10 she won "Best director" for The Elephant Man at Dundee Rep. This production was described as "an impressive mixture of artistry and confidence filled with imagination and poignancy".
