= Fifth Estate (disambiguation) =

The Fifth Estate is most strongly associated with bloggers, journalists, hacktivists, and media outlets that operate outside of the mainstream media.

Fifth Estate may also refer to:

- The Fifth Estate (TV program), a Canadian investigative newsmagazine (1975–present)
- The Fifth Estate (film), a 2013 movie about WikiLeaks
- Fifth Estate (periodical), an American anarchist periodical and former Detroit underground newspaper
- The Fifth Estate (band), an American band
- "The Fifth Estate" (Between the Lines), a 1993 television episode
- Fifth Estate Theatre Company, a Scottish theatre company
- Lord High Commissioner to the Parliament of Scotland, the fifth Estates of Scotland
- The Fifth Estate (Newspaper), an Australian online Newspaper launched in April 2009 focusing on the sustainable built environment

== See also ==
- Estates of the realm
- Fifth column
- Fourth Estate
