= Claire Benedict =

British actress (born 1951)

- Born: 28 July 1951 (age 75); Antigua
- Education: London Academy of Music and Dramatic Art
- Occupation: Actress
- Years active: 1978–present
- Awards: Time Out Award for Best Performance, 1988

Claire Benedict (born 28 July 1951) is a British actress known for her work in classical productions on the British stage, but best known for portraying the principal character Mma Ramotswe in the continuing radio adaptations of The No 1 Ladies' Detective Agency. She won a Time Out Award for Best Performance for her portrayal of Sophia Adams in Errol John's Moon on a Rainbow Shawl, directed by Maya Angelou. She lives in Todmorden in the Pennines.

== Early life ==
Benedict was born in Antigua and began to act in London at Norwood Secondary School for Girls, then Kingsway Further Education College on Gray's Inn Road. After two years at Kingway College, she gained entrance to the London Academy of Music and Dramatic Art (LAMDA). After leaving LAMDA, Benedict worked with Theatre in Education (TIE) in London then trained with the Black Theatre Workshop of Montréal.

== Career ==
In her first ten years after completing her training, Benedict worked on the British stage in leading roles for smaller theatre companies and supporting roles for larger theatre companies until in 1988, when she received a Time Out award for Best Performance for her portrayal of Sophia Adams in Errol John's Moon on a Rainbow Shawl, directed by Maya Angelou.

In 1992, Benedict joined the Royal Shakespeare Company (RSC) to do three plays, Odyssey, Cleopatra and Tamburlaine. On Cleopatra, Benedict was taken on as an understudy for Clare Higgins when not many people of colour were playing the character of Cleopatra. In November 1992, Benedict was needed to step in at short notice and had not had time to fully rehearse the role. Carol Chillington-Rutter's book Enter the Body explores this subject with reference to Benedict's performance, where she explores why women of colour have traditionally been cast as Charmain and white women Cleopatra.

By 1994, The Independent included Benedict in a shortlist of "seasoned thoroughbred Shakespearians, gutsy actors who are assured verse speakers". She is now an associate artist at the RSC.

Benedict has for many years worked in radio drama, where she is known for portraying the principal character Mma Ramotswe in the radio adaptations of Alexander McCall Smith's The No 1 Ladies' Detective Agency novels. On television, she played a series regular in Call Red, and numerous supporting roles.

Benedict has played the part of Iyaloja in four separate productions of Wole Soyinka's play Death and the King's Horseman: Royal Exchange Theatre, Manchester directed by Phyllida Lloyd in 1990; Royal National Theatre directed by Rufus Norris in 2009; and two productions for BBC Radio 3 directed by Alby James in 1995 and directed by Pauline Harris in 2014.

Benedict has worked with Lenny Henry on many occasions: supporting roles in his television series; playing his character's father's girlfriend then wife in all four series of Rudy's Rare Records on BBC Radio 4; playing the lead role in the first radio play he wrote Corrinne Come Back and Gone; and in two of the series of Bad Faith radio plays in which he played the lead role. In February 1994, during rehearsals for the Young Vic's Omma, the entire cast, including Benedict and Toby Jones, quit the production when they thought director Tim Supple was failing to give them appropriate direction.

== Credits ==
=== Theatre ===
Date	Title	Role	Director	Company Theatre	Notes
12 April 1978 – 16 April 1978	Hey You, Light Man	Mabel Le Grain	Terry Donald	Black Theatre Workshop, Montréal, Québec	
11 November 1978 – 14 November 1978	The Gingerbread Lady	Evy Meara	Terry Donald	Black Theatre Workshop, Montréal, Québec	
1979 –	Dreadful Tales		Frank Whitten	Common Stock Theatre Company	
August 1979 –	Away From It	Teenager	Frank Whitten	Common Stock Theatre Company	
1982 –	Mama Decemba	The Best Friend		Birmingham Repertory Theatre Company	
29 August 1983 – 1 February 1984	Don Juan	Donna Elvira	John Retallack	Actors Touring Company	
26 March 1984 – 26 June 1984	Twelfth Night	Maria, Curio	John Retallack	Actors Touring Company	
1986 –	So Long on Lonely Street	Annabel Lee	Lou Stein	Palace Theatre, Watford	
16 December 1986 – 24 January 1987	Flash Trash	Mama Queenie	Yvonne Brewster	Half Moon Theatre	
6 January 1987 –	The Nine Night		Gloria Hamilton	Umoja Theatre Company	
30 March 1987 – 13 June 1987	11 Josephine House	Gloria	Gloria Hamilton	Umoja Theatre Company and Black Theatre Co-operative	
7 October 1987 – 19 December 1987	The Cape Orchard	Dianne Cupido	Roland Rees	Foco Novo	
28 January 1988 – 27 February 1988	King of England	Susan	Philip Hedley	Theatre Royal, Stratford East	
May 1988 –	Moon on a Rainbow Shawl	Sophia Adams	Maya Angelou	Almeida Theatre	
1988 –	The Bacchae	Agave	Nancy Meckler	Shared Experience	
22 February 1989 – 15 May 1989	The Doctor of Honour	Doña Leonar	Lindsay Posner	Cheek by Jowl	
September 1989 – January 1990	Macbeth	Lady Macbeth	Nigel Jamieson	Odyssey Theatre Company	
May 1990 – September 1990	Romeo and Juliet	Nurse	Bill Homewood	Hull Truck	
22 November 1990 – 15 December 1990	Death and the King's Horseman	Yaloja	Phyllida Lloyd	Royal Exchange Theatre, Manchester	
8 June 1991 –	The White Devil	Cornelia	Philip Prowse	Olivier, National, London	
31 October 1991 – 30 November 1991	Medea	Medea	Phyllida Lloyd	Royal Exchange, Manchester	
2 July 1992 –	The Odyssey	Eurycleia	Greg Doran	Royal Shakespeare Company; The Other Place, Stratford-upon-Avon	
1 September 1992 – 1993	Tamburlaine the Great	Zenocrate	Terry Hands	Royal Shakespeare Company; Swan, Stratford; Barbican Theatre, London	
29 October 1992 –	Antony and Cleopatra	Charmian	John Caird	Royal Shakespeare Company	
2 March 1993 – 9 March 1993	Antony and Cleopatra	Charmian	John Caird	Royal Shakespeare Company; Theatre Royal, Newcastle-upon-Tyne	
22 June 1993 –	The Odyssey	Eurycleia	Greg Doran	Royal Shakespeare Company; The Pit, Barbican Arts Centre, London	
–	The Odyssey	Helen of Troy	Greg Doran	Royal Shakespeare Company	
1997 –	A Midsummer Night's Dream	Titania, Hippolyta	Phelim McDermott; Julian Crouch	English Shakespeare Company	
1997 – 1998	To Kill A Mockingbird			Theatre Royal, Bath	
3 December 1998 – 19 December 1998	So Special	The Mother, Nurse	Matthew Lloyd	Royal Exchange Theatre, Manchester	
28 January 1999 – 27 February 1999	The Tempest	Antonio	Jude Kelly	West Yorkshire Playhouse, Leeds	
25 May 2000 – 19 August 2000	The Gift	Bernice	Annie Castledine	Birmingham Repertory Theatre Company; Tricycle Theatre Kilburn, London	
11 October 2000 – 11 November 2000	The Critic / The Dispute	Mrs. Dangle	Matthew Lloyd	Royal Exchange Theatre, Manchester	
25 April 2002 – 14 September 2002	Eastward Ho!	Mistress Touchstone	Lucy Pitman-Wallace	Royal Shakespeare Company; Swan, Stratford	
2 July 2002 – 14 September 2002	The Island Princess	Quisana	Gregory Doran	Royal Shakespeare Company; Swan, Stratford	
20 August 2002 – 13 September 2002	The Malcontent	Maquerelle	Dominic Cooke	Royal Shakespeare Company; Swan, Stratford	
25 September 2002 – 11 October 2002	The Malcontent	Maquerelle	Dominic Cooke	Royal Shakespeare Company; Newcastle Playhouse, Newcastle-upon-Tyne	
30 September 2002 – 10 October 2002	Eastward Ho!	Mistress Touchstone	Lucy Pitman-Wallace	Royal Shakespeare Company; Newcastle Playhouse, Newcastle-upon-Tyne	
9 October 2002 – 12 October 2002	The Island Princess	Quisana	Gregory Doran	Royal Shakespeare Company; Newcastle Playhouse, Newcastle-upon-Tyne	
7 December 2002 – 22 March 2003	The Malcontent	Maquerelle	Dominic Cooke	Royal Shakespeare Company; Gielgud Theatre, London	
21 December 2002 – 19 March 2003	Eastward Ho!	Mistress Touchstone	Lucy Pitman-Wallace	Royal Shakespeare Company; Gielgud Theatre, London	
28 December 2002 – 17 March 2003	The Island Princess	Quisana	Gregory Doran	Royal Shakespeare Company; Gielgud Theatre, London	
16 December 2004 – 23 March 2005	Fix Up	Norma	Angus Jackson	National Theatre; Cottesloe Theatre, London	
6 December 2005 – 30 September 2006	The Canterbury Tales	The Wife of Bath	Gregory Doran, Rebecca Gatwood, Jonathan Munby	Royal Shakespeare Company	
4 February 2008 – 5 April 2008	Angel House	Jean	Paulette Randal	New Wolsey Theatre	
9 June 2008 – 2 August 2008	Romeo and Juliet	Nurse	Timothy Sheader	New Shakespeare Company; Regent's Park Open Air Theatre	
13 June 2008 – 30 July 2008	Twelfth Night	Maria	Edward Dick	New Shakespeare Company; Regent's Park Open Air Theatre	
8 April 2009 – 17 June 2009	Death and the King's Horseman	Iyaloja	Rufus Norris	Olivier, National, London	
11 September 2014 – 25 October 2014	Hamlet	Player King, Marcella	Sarah Frankcom	Royal Exchange Theatre, Manchester	

(Note: This list from the original author to be verified and moved into table above: 1985 The Contact Theatre Co. Manchester. Oedipus Rex; The Messenger; Director: Anthony Clark. 1994 The Young Vic Theatre, London. Oedipus Rex; Antigone/Jocasta; Director: Tim Supple. This suggests Benedict left this production during rehearsals 1999 Centre Line Productions. Women on the Verge of H.R.T. Get away; Tassa. The Independent's review doesn't mention Claire The British Theatre Guide's review doesn't mention Claire 2005 The Royal Shakespeare Co. Canterbury Tales;Wife of Bath/ Miller's Wife/ Pertelote. 2006 The Royal Shakespeare Co. Canterbury Tales;Wife of Bath;/ Miller's Wife/ Pertelote; Directors' :Greg Doran / Jonathan Munby /and Rebecca Gatward. 2010 R.S.C. Silly Masque (opening of the new R.S.T); Goddess Juno; Director: Greg Doran.)

=== Film ===
Year	Title	Role	Notes
1996	Merisairas aka Seasick	Cook Saba	
1997	The Fifth Province		
1999	Felicia's Journey	Miss Calligary	
2015	Jupiter Ascending	Bureaucrat	
2015	Hamlet	Marcella / Player King	
2019	The Invisible	Gertrude	

=== Television ===
Date	Title	Role	Network	Notes
	Dream Team		Channel 5	(Note: Inconsistency in the referenced theatre programme: this series was Sky not Channel 5.)
	Text In Time		BBC tv	(Note: This might be "Texts in Time", but Benedict is not credited for any of those on the BBC web site)
1988	The Bill: Country Cousin (S 4: Ep 9)	Mrs Williams	Thames Television	
1992	Prime Suspect 2	Esme Allen	Granada Television	
1994	The Bill: Land of the Blind (S 10: Ep 127)	Miranda Kerr	Thames Television	
1996	Call Red	Jude Patton	Thames Television	
1997	Grange Hill	Mrs Phillips	BBC tv	
1998	Still Here: Just So Much A Body Can Take	Ethel	BBC tv	
2003	Doctors: Docwatch (S 5: Ep 156)	Christine Babbage	BBC tv	
2004	Casualty: Taking Care	Lesley Chambers	BBC tv	
2004	Feather Boy	Matron	BBC tv	
2005	The Lenny Henry Show	Nurse	BBC tv	
2006	Eleventh Hour: Resurrection	Amanda Ross	Granada Television	
2007	Holby City: The Apprentice	Elizabeth McFarlane	BBC tv	
2008	Poppy Shakespeare	Rosetta	Channel 4	
2009	Unforgiven	Elaine (psychotherapist)	ITV	
2010	Above Suspicion: The Red Dahlia (S 2: Ep 1)	Mrs Jenkins	ITV	
2010	Thorne: Scaredy Cat (Ep 1, 3)	Maeve Reynolds	Sky Television	
2011	Waking the Dead: Conviction (S 9: Ep 7–8)	Lisbetta Barclay	BBC tv	
2012	The One Lenny Henry	Esther	BBC tv	
2012	Secrets and Words: A Study in Time	Connie	BBC tv	
2012	Holby City: Taxi for Spence	Margaret O'Sullivan	BBC tv	
2015	Casualty: A Child's Heart: Part One and Part Two	Olivia Costelloe	BBC tv	
2015–2016	In the Club (2 episodes)	Myleene Browning	BBC tv	
2017	The Frankenstein Chronicles: ep 9, ep 10, ep 12	Mrs Wild	ITV Encore	

=== Radio ===
Date	Title	Role	Director	Station
12 December 1994 – 16 December 1994	Invisible Cities		Tessa Watt	BBC Radio 3
6 April 1995	Charley Tango	Bettina & Sister Euphonia	Jeremy Mortimer	BBC Radio 4 Afternoon Play
17 September 1995	Death and the King's Horseman	Iyaloja	Alby James	BBC Radio 3 The Sunday Play
2 October 1995	Rainmaker		Hamish Wilson	BBC Radio 4 Monday Play
3 March 1996	A Raisin in the Sun		Claire Grove	BBC Radio 3 The Sunday Play
9 May 1996	Out of the Woods	Bonnie	Gordon House	BBC Radio 4 Afternoon Play
17 June 1996	United States		Andy Jordan	BBC Radio 4 The Monday Play
12 August 1996	Spell Number 7	Bettina	Pam Fraser Solomon	BBC Radio 4 The Monday Play
26 August 1996	Song of a Bluefoot Man	Mother Africa	Alby James	BBC Radio 4 The Monday Play
5 November 1996	Short Story: Dilemma	Read By	Pam Fraser Solomon	BBC Radio 4 Short Story
1 November 1998	The Late Story: A Living Legend	Read By	Gaynor Macfarlane	BBC Radio 4 The Late Story
8 June 1999	Those Old Metal Things	Bertha	Pauline Harris	BBC Radio 4 Afternoon Play
11 July 1999	Document of Identity	Kiisu	Pauline Harris	BBC Radio 3 The Sunday Play
13 August 2000 (R)	The Late Story: Miss Joyce and Bobcat	Read By	Melanie Harris	BBC Radio 4 The Late Story
1 January 2001 – 5 January 2001	The Book of the City of Ladies	Reason	Polly Thomas	BBC Radio 4 Woman's Hour Drama
28 November 2001	Always the Bridesmaid	Sarah	Pauline Harris	BBC Radio 4 Afternoon Play
21 February 2002	When	Sahara	Vanessa Whitburn	BBC Radio 4 Afternoon Play
22 April 2003	The Other Side of Truth	Aunt Gracie / Mrs Bankole	Pauline Harris	BBC Radio 4 Afternoon Play
1 February 2004	Measure for Measure	Mistress Overdone	Claire Grove	BBC Radio 3 Drama on 3
8 February 2004	The Winter's Tale	Paulina	Nadia Molinari	BBC Radio 3 Drama on 3
17 May 2004	I Was a Stranger	Lakiyaye & Queen Victoria	Pauline Harris	BBC Radio 4 Afternoon Play
29 May 2004	Amen Corner	Sister Margaret Alexander	Rishi Sankar	BBC World Service
10 September 2004	The No. 1 Ladies' Detective Agency: The Daddy	Mma Ramotswe	Gaynor Macfarlane	BBC Radio 4 Afternoon Play
17 September 2004	The No. 1 Ladies' Detective Agency: The Bone	Mma Ramotswe	Gaynor Macfarlane	BBC Radio 4 Afternoon Play
24 September 2004	The No. 1 Ladies' Detective Agency: The Maid	Mma Ramotswe	Gaynor Macfarlane	BBC Radio 4 Afternoon Play
1 October 2004	The No. 1 Ladies' Detective Agency: Tears of the Giraffe	Mma Ramotswe	Gaynor Macfarlane	BBC Radio 4 Afternoon Play
30 August 2005	The No. 1 Ladies' Detective Agency: The Chief Justice of Beauty	Mma Ramotswe	Gaynor Macfarlane	BBC Radio 4 Afternoon Play
6 September 2005	The No. 1 Ladies' Detective Agency: The Confession	Mma Ramotswe	Gaynor Macfarlane	BBC Radio 4 Afternoon Play
13 September 2005	The No. 1 Ladies' Detective Agency: The Kalahari Typing School for Men	Mma Ramotswe	Gaynor Macfarlane	BBC Radio 4 Afternoon Play
20 September 2005	The No. 1 Ladies' Detective Agency: The Admirer	Mma Ramotswe	Gaynor Macfarlane	BBC Radio 4 Afternoon Play
18 January 2007	The No. 1 Ladies' Detective Agency: How to Handle Men through the Application of Psychology	Mma Ramotswe	Kirsty Williams	BBC Radio 4 Afternoon Play
25 January 2007	The No. 1 Ladies' Detective Agency: House of Hope	Mma Ramotswe	Kirsty Williams	BBC Radio 4 Afternoon Play
1 February 2007	The No. 1 Ladies' Detective Agency: The Return of Note	Mma Ramotswe	Kirsty Williams	BBC Radio 4 Afternoon Play
8 February 2007	The No. 1 Ladies' Detective Agency: The Ceremony	Mma Ramotswe	Kirsty Williams	BBC Radio 4 Afternoon Play
25 November 2007	Blood Wedding	Moon	Pauline Harris	BBC Radio 3 Drama on 3
1 January 2008	The No. 1 Ladies' Detective Agency: There Is No Such Thing as Free Food	Mma Ramotswe	Gaynor Macfarlane	BBC Radio 4 Afternoon Play
2 January 2008	The No. 1 Ladies' Detective Agency: The Best Profession for a Blackmailer	Mma Ramotswe	Gaynor Macfarlane	BBC Radio 4 Afternoon Play
3 January 2008	The No. 1 Ladies' Detective Agency: A Very Rude Woman	Mma Ramotswe	Gaynor Macfarlane	BBC Radio 4 Afternoon Play
4 January 2008	The No. 1 Ladies' Detective Agency: Talking Shoes	Mma Ramotswe	Gaynor Macfarlane	BBC Radio 4 Afternoon Play
26 February 2008	Rudy's Rare Records: Take Me Home, Country Roads	Doreen	Lucy Armitage	BBC Radio 4
4 March 2008	Rudy's Rare Records: Roots Manoeuvres	Doreen	Lucy Armitage	BBC Radio 4
25 December 2008	The No. 1 Ladies' Detective Agency: The Miracle at Speedy Motors	Mma Ramotswe	Gaynor Macfarlane	BBC Radio 4 Afternoon Play
21 September 2009 – 22 September 2009	Blame the Parents	Linda Swann	Steven Canny and Peter Leslie Wild	BBC Radio 4 Afternoon Play
14 October 2009– 28 October 2009	Rudy's Rare Records: * "Ill Communication" * "Oh Carolina" * "Daddy Cool"	roles by episode: * Doreen / Ms Rogers * Carolina * Doreen	Lucy Armitage	BBC Radio 4
25 December 2009 (holiday double)	The No. 1 Ladies' Detective Agency: * "Tea Time for the Traditionally Built" * "The Seller of Beds"	Mma Ramotswe	Eilidh McCreadie	BBC Radio 4 Afternoon Play
26 September 2010	Lorca's Rural Trilogy: Yerma	Dolores	Pauline Harris	BBC Radio 3 Drama on 3
18 January 2011– 22 February 2011	Rudy's Rare Records: * "No Richie, No Cry" * "It's a Family Affair" * "Redemption Song" * "Rudy's Rare Record" * "Lights Out" * "Girls and Boys"	Doreen	Lucy Armitage	BBC Radio 4
30 May 2011	Corrinne Come Back and Gone	Corrinne	Claire Grove	BBC Radio 4 Afternoon Play
7 October 2011– 14 October 2011	Bad Faith: * "Insha'Allah" * "Opiate of the Masses"	Marianne Brown	Mary Peate	BBC Radio 4 Afternoon Play
3 November 2011– 4 November 2011	The No. 1 Ladies' Detective Agency: * "A Late Van Just Glimpsed" * "The Saturday Big Tent Wedding"	Mma Ramotswe	Gaynor Macfarlane	BBC Radio 4 Afternoon Play
9 October 2012– 13 November 2012	Rudy's Rare Records: * "Three's a Crowd" * "Best Local Business" * "Let It Grow" * "It's Grim up North" * "Miss Reenie Comes to Stay" * "Sound of da Police"	Doreen	Katie Tyrrell	BBC Radio 4
20 March 2013– 21 March 2013	The No. 1 Ladies' Detective Agency: * "A Man from a Far Place" * "The Limpopo Academy of Private Detection"	Mma Ramotswe	Gaynor Macfarlane	BBC Radio 4 Afternoon Play
5 February 2014– 6 February 2014	The No. 1 Ladies' Detective Agency: * "The Modern Husband Course" * "The Minor Adjustment Beauty Salon"	Mma Ramotswe	Eilidh McCreadie	BBC Radio 4 Afternoon Play
13 July 2014	Death and the King's Horseman	Iyaloja	Pauline Harris	BBC Radio 3 Drama on 3
12 March 2015– 13 March 2015	The No. 1 Ladies' Detective Agency: * "The Handsome Man's Deluxe Cafe" * "The Dish of Yesterday"	Mma Ramotswe	Eilidh McCreadie	BBC Radio 4 Afternoon Play
4 August 2016– 5 August 2016	The No. 1 Ladies' Detective Agency: * "This Is Not a Rubbish Boy" * "The Woman Who Walked in Sunshine"	Mma Ramotswe	Gaynor Macfarlane	BBC Radio 4 Afternoon Play
23 June 2019	The Invisible	Gertrude	Nadia Molinari	BBC Radio 3 Drama on 3
