= George Rae (actor) =

Scottish actor

- Born: 23 November 1978 (age 47); Ayrshire, Scotland
- Occupation: Actor
- Years active: 2002 - present

George Hamilton Rae (born 23 November 1978, Ayrshire, Scotland) is a Scottish actor best known for his portrayal of Otto Kringelein in the 2015 London revival of the musical Grand Hotel.

== Early life ==
Rae was born in Irvine, North Ayrshire, Scotland and attended Ayr Academy. He continued his education at Iain Tomlin School of Music at Edinburgh Napier University, where he graduated with a Bachelor of Music Degree, followed by the Royal Academy of Music, London, where he graduated with a Postgraduate Diploma (Distinction) in Musical Theatre and the Licentiate of the Royal Academy of Music as a Singing Teacher.

== Career ==
Rae made his West End debut in 2003 starring in Joseph and the Amazing Technicolour Dreamcoat at London's New London Theatre alongside Stephen Gately from the Irish boyband Boyzone.

Following Joseph, Rae performed in several productions at Scotland’s Pitlochry Festival Theatre where he was awarded the prestigious Leon Sinden Award in 2010 for his portrayal as Tim in Noises Off. He also created the role of George Campbell in the theatre’s first musical production, Whisky Galore a Musical! (2009).

In 2013 Rae embarked on the UK & Ireland tour of The Lion King in the role of Timon, including the Irish premiere of the show. Following this, he performed the role of Otto Kringelein in the 2015 London revival of Grand Hotel; nominated for three Best Actor awards, including the 2016 Offie, and was subsequently featured in theatre critic Mark Shenton’s 2017 list of the ten best men in UK musical theatre.

In 2018 Rae made his solo cabaret debut at New York City’s 54 Below.

== Theatre ==
- I Love You, You're Perfect, Now Change, Chiswick Playhouse (formerly Tabard Theatre), London (2019) ...Various
- Annie, UK & Ireland Tour (2019) ...Bert Healy
- Life is a Caba-RAE: A Scot in New York!, Feinstein's/54 Below, New York City (2018)
- Singin' in the Rain, Pitlochry Festival Theatre (2017) ...Cosmo Brown
- The Frogs, Jermyn Street Theatre, London (2017) ...Xanthias
- Spamalot, The English Theatre Frankfurt (2016) ...Patsy
- Adding Machine, Finborough Theatre, London (2016) ...Mr Two/Shrdlu
- Grand Hotel, Southwark Playhouse, London (2015) ...Otto Kringelein
- Sister Act, Aberystwyth Arts Centre (2014) ...TJ
- The Lion King, UK & Ireland Tour (2013) ...Timon/Zazu
- Company, King's Head Theatre, London (2012) ...David
- Whisky Galore a Musical!, Pitlochry Festival Theatre (2011) ...George Campbell
- Rough Crossing, Pitlochry Festival Theatre (2010) ...Dvornichek
- Kiss Me, Kate, Pitlochry Festival Theatre (2010) ...Ralph/Gremio
- Noises Off, Pitlochry Festival Theatre (2010) ...Tim
- The Life of Stuff, Pitlochry Festival Theatre (2009) ...Fraser
- The Mikado, USA & UK Tour, Carl Rosa Opera Company (2008) ...u/s Ko-Ko
- I Love You, You're Perfect, Now Change, UK & Ireland Tour (2007) ...Man 1
- Fame, UK Tour (2004) ...Schlomo
- Joseph and the Amazing Technicolor Dreamcoat, New London Theatre, London (2005, 2003) ...Benjamin

== Television ==
- Still Game, BBC Scotland (2019) ...Alan
- Some Enchanted Evening, BBC 3 (2002) ...Herbie
- Taggart, Scottish Television (2001) ...Pirate
