= The Frogs (musical) =

Stephen Sondheim musical

- Original Broadway windowcard
- Music: Stephen Sondheim
- Lyrics: Stephen Sondheim
- Book: Burt Shevelove; Nathan Lane
- Basis: The Frogs by Aristophanes
- Productions: 1974 Yale University Swimming Pool; 1988 Chicago; 2004 Broadway; 2007 Pittsburgh; 2007 Truman College Swimming Pool; 2011 St. Petersburg, Florida; 2014 Anglia Ruskin University; 2015 Sydney; 2017 West End; 2025 Off West End

The Frogs is a musical "freely adapted" by Stephen Sondheim and Burt Shevelove from The Frogs, an Ancient Greek comedy by Aristophanes. In the musical, Dionysos, despairing of the quality of living dramatists, travels to Hades to bring George Bernard Shaw back from the dead. William Shakespeare competes with Shaw for the title of best playwright, which he wins. Dionysos brings Shakespeare back to the world of the living in the hope that art can save civilization.

The musical was originally performed in Yale University's gymnasium's swimming pool in 1974. The show was produced on Broadway in 2004 with the book revised by Nathan Lane and the score expanded by Sondheim. This version was revived in London in 2017 and 2025.

== Background ==
Shevelove first wrote and directed an adaptation of The Frogs in 1971, while he was a graduate student at Yale University. According to Mary-Kay Gamel, "His central production concept involved Charon and Dionysos rowing across the Exhibition Pool in the Payne Whitney Gymnasium, while the Frogs, played by members of the Yale swimming team, swam around the boat."

== Production history ==
=== Yale University ===
The Frogs was performed by the Yale Repertory Theatre in the Yale swimming pool, opening on May 21, 1974, for 8 performances. Shevelove directed, with choreography by Carmen de Lavallade; Larry Blyden played Dionysos. The piece used a Greek chorus: "Sondheim's works frequently focus on an ensemble of characters, a practice which has led one critic to compare his use of the chorus to Greek drama. In 1974, Sondheim was becoming interested in contrapuntal writing, and most of the songs in the 1974 version correspond to choral numbers in the Greek." The ensemble included then–Yale students Meryl Streep, Sigourney Weaver and Christopher Durang. Among those who reviewed it, the musical was a critical success. Sondheim compared the acoustics of the production to "putting on a show in a men's urinal".

=== Regional and UK productions ===
A regional production opened in January 1975, but drew little interest. In 1984, the University Theatre in New York City staged a production of The Frogs, beginning on April 12, 1984.

A production at the Old Brentford Baths in London opened on July 24, 1990, for a short run. The cast featured Richard Zajdlic as Dionysos and Bob Husson as Xanthias, with choreography by Ron Howell and direction by John Gardyne. In October 1991, the first production in an Olympic sized pool took place in Coventry. It ran for four performances. Produced by Keith Taylor and directed by Keith Taylor and Clare Walters, the cast included Anthony Cable, Verona Chard, Bernard Tagliavini and Raymond Sargent.

By 1979, Nathan Lane had become interested in the piece. He "found a copy of the script at the Drama Book Shop and was very intrigued by it". On May 22, 2000, Lane, with Davis Gaines and Brian Stokes Mitchell, performed a concert version of The Frogs at the Library of Congress in Washington, D.C.

=== 2004 Broadway revival ===
Shortly after performing in the concert adaptation, Lane began revising and expanding the show's book into a two-act structure typical of American musicals; the first act was expanded, the second condensed. Lane explained what drew him to expand The Frogs: "after September 11 ... I started to think, there's something in this piece right now. ... There's something idealistic about the notion of someone believing that the arts can make a difference. ... I found it moving, in light of what is going on in the world." The new book included indirect references to George W. Bush and the Iraq War.

For the new production, Sondheim wrote seven new songs, including ones that focused on individual characters rather than an ensemble. The Lincoln Center Theater produced the piece, now titled The Frogs: A New Broadway Musical, at their Vivian Beaumont Theater on Broadway. The revival, labeled as "even more freely adapted" by Lane, opened on July 22, 2004, with Lane as Dionysos and Roger Bart as Xanthias. Chris Kattan had co-starred in previews, but was replaced by Bart a week before the show opened. the cast also included John Byner as Charon, Daniel Davis as Shaw, Peter Bartlett as Hades, Burke Moses as Heracles, and Michael Siberry as Shakespeare. Orchestrations were by Jonathan Tunick and Paul Gemignani was musical director, both longtime collaborators with Sondheim. Susan Stroman both directed and choreographed; costumes were designed by William Ivey Long.

It opened to a mixed critical reception. Most complained that Lane's new plot was "loose", while others noted that the mix of low-brow comedy and high ideals seemed at odds, although others noted that this was what Aristophanes had done. The production closed on October 10, 2004, after 92 performances. The revival was nominated for three Drama League Awards: Distinguished Production of a Musical (Lincoln Center Theater) and Distinguished performance (Nathan Lane and Roger Bart).

=== Subsequent productions ===
The Frogs was produced by the Pegasus Players in Chicago, Illinois, in March to April 1988. The Chicago Tribune called the production "a fascinating novelty, and more. It's ingeniously designed and staged, strongly sung and acted; and, though it has only a few musical numbers in its 100 minutes of playing time, each song is splendid." The Pegasus Players also produced the piece in 2007, in the swimming pool at Truman College. The first regional production of the revival version opened in Pittsburgh on February 14, 2007, starring Jordan Grubb as Xanthias and Dale Spollett as Dionysos. It closed after a limited engagement on February 25, 2007.

On February 3, 2011, a production by the FreeFall Theatre opened at their venue in St. Petersburg, Florida. Directed by Eric Davis, the cast included Jorge Acosta, Dick Baker, and Joel Martin. That run ended on February 20, 2011.

In January 2014, Anglia Ruskin University presented a showing of The Frogs at the Mumford Theatre in Cambridge, UK. It played for two nights on the 17th and 18 January, featuring Tariq Daniels as Dionysos, Gemma Dixon as Xanthias, Keegan Featherstone as Hades and Jade Copeman as Ariadne.

On August 13, 2015, a production by UTS Backstage, the Film and Theatre Society at the University of Technology, Sydney, opened at the Lend-Lease Theatre in Sydney, Australia. Directed by Chris McKay, the cast included Luke Baweja, Gabrielle Rawlings, Abigail Dixon, Michael Mulvena, Alan Zhu, Alissa Del Vecchio, James Wilson, and Oliver Morassut as Hades. The limited run of this show was the Australian premiere. It had a short run because the Theatre Society was a non-profit organization made up of students in the Sydney area.

The musical was revived on March 19, 2017, for a limited run at London's Jermyn Street Theatre playing until April 8, 2017. It was directed by Grace Wessels and starred Michael Matus as Dionysos and George Rae as Xanthias.

The MasterVoices chorus, under the direction of artistic director Ted Sperling, presented a production of The Frogs at the Rose Theater at Jazz at Lincoln Center on Friday, November 3, and Saturday, November 4, 2023. The cast included Douglas Sills, Kevin Chamberlin, Marc Kudisch, Chuck Cooper, Peter Bartlett, Dylan Baker, Jordan Donica, Candice Corbin, and Nathan Lane.

A new production opened at the Southwark Playhouse in London on 23 May 2025 to mixed reviews, under the direction of Georgie Rankom, featuring Dan Buckley in the role of Dionysus and Kevin McHale in the role of Xanthias.

== Synopsis ==
=== Act I ===
The show opens with two "actors," played by the same actors as the main characters of the play but considered different in the libretto, discussing which play they should perform. One actor suggests "the one about the man who kills his father and sleeps with his mother", but the other actor is in too good a mood for tragedy and they decide to perform a comedy instead. However, before they can perform, they must make an invocation: dedicating the performance to the theatre gods, and instructing the audience how to behave ("Invocation and Instructions to the Audience"). Just as they are about to further delay the action, the Chorus enters demanding the actors begin.

The Actors return as Dionysos, god of wine and drama, and his slave Xanthias. Dionysos is in despair about the state of the world, and has decided to travel to Hades to bring back the great writer George Bernard Shaw, who Dionysos believes will speak to society and help with its problems ("It Is Time We Start Our Journey") ("I Love to Travel"). His first stop is at the house of his half-brother Heracles to gain advice on how to enter Hades. Heracles says that Dionysos should don a lion-skin and pretend to be Heracles, and instructs the rather weak-willed god in proper heroic behaviour ("Dress Big"). The lesson seems to take, although Dionysos soon reverts to his old self. Heracles also warns them of the Frogs, dangerous creatures who live on the River Styx and are terrified of change.

The pair travel to the Styx ("I Love to Travel (Reprise)"), where they meet the severely depressive ferryman, Charon ("All Aboard"). Charon agrees to take Xanthias and Dionysos to the Underworld, and claims that there are no Frogs on the river. Traveling on the River, Dionysos recounts the (mythologically accurate) story of his deceased wife Ariadne ("On The River Styx"). When he took her to Mount Olympus to marry her, she was worried that she could not compare to the Olympian gods, he made her a crown of stars to help her look like a goddess. However, as she was only a mortal, she died soon afterwards, and Dionysos threw her crown back into the sky. He says he is glad that there are no stars in Hell ("Ariadne").

Later that night, Dionysos is awoken by a cry of "brek-ek-ek-ek!" He soon works out that the Frogs have come; they drag him out of the boat and tempt him into a life of frogdom, hopping around without any cares or worries ("The Frogs"). Although Dionysos is briefly rescued by Xanthias, the Frogs return while Xanthias is distracted, and drag Dionysos back into the water.

=== Act II ===
Dionysos climbs back on the boat drenched and covered with weeds, still quivering from his horrible confrontation with the frogs. Undaunted, Charon steers them to the dock, where Dionysos and Xanthias disembark. They run into Dionysian worshipers ("Hymn to Dionysos"), but Xanthias reminds Dionysos of their mission, and they continue to the Palace of Pluto.

Aeakos, keeper of the keys to the palace, sees Dionysos in his Heracles disguise and vows vengeance on the god who slew the three-headed watchdog of Hades. At the urging of Dionysos, Xanthias dons the Heracles suit, and they encounter Charisma, the beautiful handmaiden to Persephone. Mistaking Xanthias for Heracles, she invites him to a sensuous bath in hippopotamus milk. Tantalized, Dionysos takes back the lion skin and encounters Virilla, Queen of the Amazons, who accuses him (Dionysos, again dressed as Heracles) of stealing the girdle of her leader Hippolyte.

At the height of all the confusion, Pluto enters, surrounded by the flames of Hades. Dionysos sheds his Heracles disguise, and Pluto welcomes the god with open arms, disabusing him of the misconception that Hades is a dangerous place ("Hades").

Dionysos tells Pluto of his plan to bring Shaw back to earth, and Pluto reveals that all the dead playwrights are banqueting at his palace at that very moment. As Pluto and Dionysos discuss the dire situation on Earth, the Greek Chorus offers ironic commentary to the audience: though serious matters are being weighed onstage, there is no cause for alarm ("It's Only a Play").

Following the banquet, Dionysos bursts out of the palace to proclaim the entrance of George Bernard Shaw and his loyal passel of Shavians ("Shaw"). When William Shakespeare emerges from the palace, the philosophical tension between the two titans escalates swiftly until they almost come to blows. Dionysos defuses the situation by declaring a contest between the two playwrights. Each will address the important issues of humanity using only the words of his own writings.

The supporters of Shaw and Shakespeare assemble into an arena where the verbal battle begins. Dionysos, high in his referee's chair, calls out the topics: first woman, then man, then the Life Force. Shaw and Shakespeare are sharp in their responses, Shaw delivering his pointed orations and Shakespeare responding with his poetic imagery. Grappling for a final topic (and concerned whether the people of earth will accept Shaw's rigorous social views), Dionysos calls a time-out. His deceased wife Ariadne appears, comforting her husband and advising him to follow his heart. Looking lovingly into his eyes, Ariadne assures Dionysos that the final topic is "staring you in the face".

The contest resumes, and Dionysos announces the final topic: Death. Shaw responds with a stirring passage from Saint Joan, and the crowd is hushed. Then Shakespeare speaks of death from an old man's point of view ("The Contest"). Dionysos, wanting to hear more asks him to speak of a young man's feelings. Shakespeare's response is the song ("Fear No More") from Cymbeline. The powerful poetry moves Dionysos to declare Shakespeare the winner and offer him passage to the world of the living. A disgruntled Shaw is dragged kicking and screaming from the stage as Charon the boatman announces the return trip ("All Aboard").

Xanthias, who has elected to remain in Hades with the Amazon Virilla, bids his master farewell, as the voices of Ariadne and the chorus accompany Dionysos home ("Hymn to Dionysos (Reprise)"). Dionysos and Shakespeare arrive back at the same theatre that the actors were at in the beginning. Dionyus beckons Shakespeare to speak, and the playwright responds by calling for a new play to be written to inspire humanity. As the entire company is revealed, Dionysos steps forward and addresses the audience. He urges us to shake off lethargy, to take action to resolve the earthly problems that plague our times ("Final Instructions to the Audience"). And with that, his mission is complete.

== Musical numbers ==
2004 Broadway production

Act I

- "Opening Fanfare"
- "Invocation and Instructions to the Audience" - 1st Actor, 2nd Actor, Greek Chorus
- "I Love to Travel" - Dionysos, Xanthias, Greek Chorus
- "Dress Big" - Herackles, Dionysos, Xanthias
- "I Love to Travel (reprise)" - Dionysos, Xanthias
- "All Aboard" - Charon
- "Ariadne" - Dionysos
- "The Frogs" - Dionysos, A Flash of Frogs, Fire Belly Dancing Frogs

Act II

- "Hymn to Dionysos" - 3 Graces, Dionysians, Dionysos, Xanthias
- "Hades" - Pluto and the Hellraisers
- "It's Only a Play" - Greek Chorus
- "Shaw" - Dionysos, Shaw, Shavians
- "Fear No More" (Lyrics from Act IV, Scene 2 of Shakespeare's Cymbeline.) - Shakespeare
- "All Aboard (reprise)" - Charon
- "Hymn to Dionysos (reprise)" - Greek Chorus
- "Final Instructions to the Audience" - Dionysos and Company

== Recordings ==
There are two recordings of the score available, both starring Nathan Lane. The first is a studio performance with Lane, Brian Stokes Mitchell, and Davis Gaines released in 2001 by Nonesuch Records, which also contains a complete recording of Sondheim's Evening Primrose songs. The 2004 Broadway production starring Lane and Roger Bart was released by PS Classics.

== In popular culture ==
A recurring segment entitled "Would You Rather?" on the podcast Comedy Bang! Bang! uses the entirety of the "Opening Fanfare" as its theme. A running gag involves the guests complaining about the length and host Scott Aukerman berating them for interrupting it.
