= Kill Johnny Glendenning =

- Official poster of the 2014 Lyceum production
- Written by: D C Jackson
- Setting: Hyndland & Ayrshire

Premiere
- Date premiered: 17 September 2014
- Place premiered: Royal Lyceum Theatre, Edinburgh

Kill Johnny Glendenning is a Scottish comedy crime thriller play written by D C Jackson. It made its world premiere at the Royal Lyceum Theatre, Edinburgh in September 2014, before transferring to the Citizens Theatre, Glasgow.

== Production history ==
Kill Johnny Glendenning is written by Scottish playwright D C Jackson. On 15 May 2014, it was announced the play would premiere as part of the Lyceum Theatre's 2014-15 season and would begin previews at the Royal Lyceum Theatre, Edinburgh on 17 September 2014, with an official opening night on 20 September, booking for a limited period until 11 October. Jackson had begun writing the piece two years earlier, without a commission, having feared it was unlikely to generate one due to a productions perceived cost, but also the creative freedom working without one allowed him as a playwright. Lead casting for the production included Northern Irish actor and playwright David Ireland as Johnny Glendenning and former River City actor Paul Samson as Andrew MacPherson.

The play is directed by Mark Thomson, with design by Michael Taylor, lighting design by Tim Mascall and fight direction by Rachel Bown-Williams and Ruth Cooper–Brown. Following its premiere production the play is scheduled to transfer to the Citizens Theatre, Glasgow, where it will preview on 22 October 2014, with an official opening night the following day, running until 8 November. A typical performance runs two hours and 18 minutes, including one interval of 20 mins.

== Principal roles and original cast ==
David Ireland as Johnny Glendenning with Paul Samson as Andrew MacPherson.

Character (Note: Cast listed in order of appearance.)	Lyceum performer	Citizens Theatre performer
Dominic	Philip Cairns	Philip Cairns
Skootch	Josh Whitelaw	Josh Whitelaw
Auld Jim	Kern Falconer	Kern Falconer
Andrew MacPherson	Paul Samson	Paul Samson
Johnny Glendenning	David Ireland	David Ireland
Bruce	Steven McNicoll	Steven McNicoll
Kimberley	Joanne Thomson	Joanne Thomson
