= Invisible Sister =

2015 American scifi film

- Promotional poster
- Genre: Comedy; Science fiction; Adventure
- Based on: My Invisible Sister by: Beatrice Colin; Sara Pinto
- Screenplay by: Matt Eddy; Billy Eddy
- Story by: Jessica O'Toole; Amy Rardin; Matt Eddy; Billy Eddy
- Directed by: Paul Hoen
- Starring: Rowan Blanchard; Paris Berelc
- Music by: Deborah Lurie
- Opening theme: "This Is the Time" by Superchick
- Ending theme: "I Dare You" by Bea Miller
- Country of origin: United States
- Original language: English

Production
- Executive producers: Paul Hoen; Susan Cartsonis
- Producer: Michael C. Cuddy
- Cinematography: Suki Medencevic
- Editors: Lisa Jane Robison; Craig Webster
- Running time: 77 minutes
- Production company: GWave Productions

Original release
- Network: Disney Channel
- Release: October 9, 2015

Invisible Sister is a 2015 American science fiction comedy film released as a Disney Channel Original Movie and based on the book My Invisible Sister by Beatrice Colin and Sara Pinto. The film is directed by Paul Hoen, and stars Rowan Blanchard and Paris Berelc. It focuses on a student who turns her older sister invisible due to a failed science project. It premiered on October 9, 2015, and was viewed by 4.03 million people.

== Plot ==
Cleo Eastman is a teenage girl living in the shadow of her older sister, Molly, whose popularity gets her recognized by everyone at school. Although Cleo is hardly noticed compared to her sister, she is an excellent student, but is introverted and somewhat sarcastic and cynical.

Cleo's science teacher, Mr. Perkins, sees her potential in science and decides she needs a challenge for her class project; she is to determine a mystery substance and transform it into its crystal state. As she works on the experiment at home, while Molly hosts a dinner for her lacrosse team, a moth flies by and distracts Cleo, causing her to accidentally spill unknown chemicals into her solution. The steam produced ends up turning the moth invisible, leading Cleo to chase it around the house, full of guests, before it gets away.

Later, while Molly is preparing for bed, the moth returns, attracted to the light from the bathroom. The moth flies too close to the light, gets killed by it and falls into a cup of water containing an antacid Molly is about to drink, and she unknowingly consumes the moth which renders her invisible.

The next morning, Molly is horrified when she cannot see herself and discovers the reason from Cleo. She must attend school to participate in the season opener for her lacrosse team, which college scouts will be watching. As it is Halloween, she decides to wear her costume to mask her invisibility, but when the costume also turns invisible, Molly has Cleo wear the costume and pretend to be her at school. Cleo attends the pep circle for the lacrosse team while Molly grabs a microscope from the science classroom so Cleo can figure out how to make her visible again. In the process, Molly hears Carter, a boy Cleo likes, talking with George about Cleo; she manages to secure a date for her sister by pretending to be her and asking Carter out. Things get complicated when George finds out Molly's invisibility, and her boyfriend Coug questions why she is constantly avoiding him. Later in the lacrosse game, Cleo has a rough start but slowly gets into the game with Molly's help, resulting in a victory for the team.

Upon observing Molly's cells under the microscope, Cleo and George conclude that her invisibility will become permanent unless they can formulate an antidote before midnight, twenty-four hours after Molly swallowed the moth, so they need to reproduce the results from Cleo's earlier experiment. The sisters go to a cemetery to catch another moth while George goes to school to set up. While in the cemetery, Molly's frustration over her invisibility mounts, leading to a heated argument with Cleo. In apologizing, Cleo admits to admiring Molly's "light" and is jealous because her not sharing in it makes her feel invisible. After Molly secures a moth for the experiment, the sisters take a trolley to school. While in transit, Molly tells Cleo she understands her feeling invisible, but she also envies Cleo's genius, as she knows her popularity is fleeting. Cleo clarifies to Molly that her "light" is about more than popularity.

When they arrive at school and meet George, they realize they need to get past the security guard. Using her invisibility, Molly manages to scare him out, allowing Cleo and George to enter and duplicate Cleo's original experiment. The solution turns out to be too complex for either Cleo or George to understand, and they need Carter, a governor's scholar, to analyze the results.

They look for him at the school's annual Halloween party "Romp the Swamp". While searching, Cleo bumps into Coug, who is doubting his relationship with Molly and needs to be shown she cares for him, despite being invisible. Eventually, Cleo finds Carter, who is upset with her mixed attitude, expecting they would be together for the party. After informing him about the situation, she takes him to a nearby barn, where her sister, Coug and George are gathered.

With time running short, Cleo, George, Carter and Coug work together to develop an antidote for Molly, narrowly making the midnight deadline. They nearly get in trouble when Mr. Perkins, in charge of the party, finds them in the barn, but Molly informs him about Cleo's experiment before drinking the antidote, risking the deadline. When she finally gets to the antidote, it fails but not because it passed midnight. Molly had taken some antacid the night before when she consumed the moth, so after Cleo adds a dose of that to the antidote, Molly becomes visible again upon drinking it.

Astonished by the results of Cleo's project, Mr. Perkins asks her to present her findings at a seminar of the New Orleans Association of Applied Scientists. Cleo gains a greater appreciation for the fine line between visible and invisible.

== Cast ==
- Rowan Blanchard as Cleo Eastman, Molly's younger sister
- Paris Berelc as Molly Eastman, Cleo's popular older sister
- Karan Brar as George, Cleo’s best friend and fellow science whiz kid
- Rachel Crow as Nikki, Molly's best friend and teammate and George's future girlfriend
- Alex Désert as Mr. Perkins, the high school science teacher who gave Cleo the project
- Will Meyers as Carter, Cleo's crush and science scholar
- Austin Fryberger as Coug, Molly's boyfriend

== Production ==
The film was officially announced on January 9, 2015, along with the casting of Rowan Blanchard and Paris Berelc as Cleo and Molly. On February 27, Karan Brar, Rachel Crow, and Austin Fryberger were cast as George, Nikki, and The Coug. Filming began in February 2015 and ended in April 2015 in New Orleans.

== Reception ==
The movie was viewed by 4.03 million people on its premiere night, making it the third most-watched broadcast on cable that night. An encore broadcast the next morning received 2.31 million viewers.

== Broadcast ==
The film aired on October 9, 2015 on Disney Channel in the United States and Canada. In Canada, due to a technical error at the end of the movie, the last ten minutes were replaced with the Teen Beach 2 music video, "That's How We Do". It was however fixed the next day. It premiered in French as Ma Soeur est invisible! on February 28, 2016. Invisible Sister premiered on Disney Channel in the United Kingdom and Ireland on October 23. The movie premiered on Disney Channel Israel on December 10, 2015.

== See also ==
- List of films set around Halloween
