= The Girls of Slender Means =

1963 novella by Muriel Spark

- First US edition cover (precedes UK), with quotes from John Updike, W. H. Auden and Evelyn Waugh
- Author: Muriel Spark
- Cover artist: George Salter (US edition)
- Language: English
- Publisher: Knopf (US); Macmillan (UK)
- Publication date: 1963
- Publication place: United Kingdom
- Media type: Print & Audio
- Pages: 176 (US)
- OCLC: 366910

The Girls of Slender Means is a novella written in 1963 by British author Muriel Spark. It was included in Anthony Burgess's 1984 book Ninety-Nine Novels: The Best in English since 1939 — A Personal Choice. In 2022, it was included on the "Big Jubilee Read" list of 70 books by Commonwealth authors, selected to celebrate the Platinum Jubilee of Elizabeth II.

== Plot ==
The book centres on 'The May of Teck Club', a fictional institution said to have been established by Princess May of Teck during the First World War "for the Pecuniary Convenience and Social Protection of Ladies of Slender Means below the age of Thirty Years, who are obliged to reside apart from their Families in order to follow an Occupation in London". It concerns the lives and loves of its disparate residents amongst the deprivations of immediate post-war Kensington between VE Day and VJ Day in 1945. The story is framed by the news, in 1963, that Nicholas Farringdon, an anarchist intellectual turned Jesuit, has been killed in Haiti. Journalist Jane Wright, a former inhabitant of the Club, wants to research his story. The bulk of the novella is taken up by flashbacks to 1945, concerning Farringdon and the Club, to which he had been a frequent visitor before his conversion. The narrative climaxes with a tragedy.

== Adaptations ==
In May 1975, the book was adapted for BBC television by Ken Taylor, broadcast in 3 episodes on BBC2 Produced by Martin Lisemore and Directed by Moira Armstrong. Philip Hinchcliffe handled most of the pre-production and casting, but had to leave the series when he was appointed producer of Doctor Who in 1974. Episodes were broadcast on Saturdays, followed by a Tuesday repeat. The series was repeated again on BBC2 in August 1976. The cast included: Patricia Hodge, Miriam Margolyes, Mary Tamm, Tina Heath, Valerie Lush, Jack Shepherd, Jeffrey Segal, Judith Paris and Suzy Mandel, with narrator Marjorie Westbury.

A BBC Radio adaptation followed on BBC Radio 4 on 1 August 1998 as part of The Saturday Play series. Adapted by Colin Davis, it featured Amanda Root, Joanna Monro, Abigail Docherty, Christopher Wright, Charles Simpson, Jack Ellis, Caroline Strong, Frances Jeater, Richenda Carey and Geoffrey Whitehead. Directed by Marion Nancarrow.

The novel was first adapted for the stage by Judith Adams for a production by the Scottish women's theatre company Stellar Quines in 2009. An adaptation by Gabriel Quigley was produced at the Lyceum Theatre, Edinburgh, in April 2024, under the direction of Roxana Silbert. The cast included Molly Vevers, Julia Brown, Molly McGrath, Amy Kennedy, Shannon Watson and Seamus Dillane.
