= Alby James =

British director, producer and screenwriter (born 1954)

Alby James OBE, FRSA
- Born: 24 May 1954 (age 72); London, England
- Education: University of East Anglia
- Occupations: Director and producer, screenwriter, script consultant and trainer

Alby James (born 24 May 1954) is a British theatre director and a producer for film and television drama, screenwriter, script consultant and trainer, whose career spans more than four decades. Committed to promoting diversity and inclusion in the industry, he has worked with broadcasters such as the British Broadcasting Corporation (BBC) and the South African Broadcasting Corporation (SABC), as well as being involved with other development and mentorship schemes for writers, directors and producers. From its inception in March 2017, he led the Diverse Directors' Workshop at the National Film & Television School, with the aim of improving access to the mainstream and professional independent sector for women, ethnic minorities and those with disabilities. Recognition that James has received for his work include being appointed an Officer of the Order of the British Empire (OBE) in 2019 for services to film, theatre and broadcasting.

== Biography ==
Born in north London, James attended the University of East Anglia (1974–1977), where he earned a BA degree in Development Studies, before beginning a career in directing. In 1979, he was appointed as Arts Council Trainee Assistant Director at the Royal Court Theatre, and also was Assistant Director, working with Trevor Nunn, at the Royal Shakespeare Company for its first season at the Barbican Centre (1982–83). In 1984, James became Artistic Director of Temba Theatre Company, where he "sought to create new audiences by looking beyond the uniquely black experience". He also worked for the BBC as a film and radio drama producer and director. James has also run his own theatre company, was head of development for EON Screenwriters' Workshop, and head of screenwriting at the Northern Film School at Leeds Metropolitan University (now Leeds Beckett University).

He led the Diverse Directors' Workshop launched in 2017 at the National Film & Television School. He has also run development programmes in South Africa – where he founded the Sediba Scriptwriter's Training and Development Programme, an initiative spearheaded by the NFVF and run in collaboration with the South African Script Writer's Union (SASWU) and the South African Broadcasting Corporation (SABC) – and in Russia, where he ran a script lab for four years from 2010. He also works with the Berlin International Film Festival's Berlinale Talents programme, serving as a mentor and on the selection jury.

In the 2019 New Year Honours, James was appointed an Officer of the Order of the British Empire (OBE) for services to film, theatre and broadcasting.

== Selected productions as director ==
Stage productions directed by James include:

- All You Deserve (by Debbie Horsfield) by Royal Shakespeare Company, 24 February 1983 (press night), at The Pit, Barbican Arts Centre, London.
- Fences (by August Wilson), 1990–1991, at Garrick Theatre, London.
- The Language of Flowers (by Federico García Lorca), 1990–1991, at RADA, London.
- Ghosts (by Henrik Ibsen) by Temba Theatre Company, UK Tour (?–1 June 1991) and Contact Theatre, Manchester (29 January–February 1991).
- The Constant Wife (by W. Somerset Maugham), 1991–1992, at RADA, London
- Lysistrata (by Aristophanes), 1991–1992, at RADA, London
- The Shelter (by Caryl Phillips), 1992–1993, at RADA, London
- King Lear (by William Shakespeare), 1993, at RADA, London
