= Deirdre Davis =

Scottish actress (born 1963)

Deirdre Davis (born 1963) is a Scottish actress. She is known for her role as Eileen Donachie in the BBC Scotland soap opera River City, which she starred in for almost 14 years, from its first broadcast on 24 September 2002 until May 2016. She has also appeared in the films Orphans (1998), The Debt Collector (1999), The Magdalene Sisters (2002), and The Rocket Post (2004).

== Early life and career ==
Davis was born in Liverpool England, to Glaswegian parents. When she was a toddler, her parents moved back to Cardonald, Glasgow. She attended Penilee Secondary School, and it was only then that she realised her interest in drama. After secondary school, Deirdre studied a course in languages. However, she quit after a year to become a singer in a soul band.

At the age of 25, Davis went to the Royal Scottish Academy of Music and Drama. Soon after graduating in 1991, she got roles in theatre plays and short films.

== Television ==
In 2002, Davis joined the cast of BBC Scotland's River City, playing the character of Eileen Donachie. She left the program in 2016, leaving Stephen Purdon as the final member of the original cast to leave the show.

== Theatre ==
Davis has worked for a number of theatre companies, including the Tron Theatre, Perth Rep and 7:84 Theatre.

Year	Title	Role	Company	Director	Notes
2018	The Last Witch	Janet Horne	Pitlochry Festival Theatre	Richard Baron	play by Rona Munro

In 1999, Davis appeared with Jimmy Logan and Edith MacArthur in The Summertime has Come at Pitlochry Festival Theatre. Since then she has returned to Pitlochry several times, appearing in The Magistrate, Heartbreak House, Cinderella, Sleeping Beauty, Monarch of the Glen, Blithe Spirit, Heritage and North and South. She was also a member of the Pitlochry Festival Theatre's Winter Ensemble in 2021. She joined the summer season of shows at Pitlochry in 2022, appearing in Sherlock Holmes: A Study in Lipstick, Ketchup and Blood, Private Lives, Noises Off and Little Women.

In autumn 2023, Davis played Edie Rennie in the Lyceum Theatre, Edinburgh and Pitlochry Festival Theatre's production of Peter Arnott's Group Portrait in a Summer Landscape.
