= Allan Sharpe =

Scottish actor and playwright (1949–2004)

Allan Richard Sharpe (13 January 1949 – 5 June 2004) was a Scottish actor, theatre director, and playwright who co-founded the Fifth Estate Theatre Company based at the Netherbow Theatre in Edinburgh, Scotland.

== Early life ==
Allan Sharpe was born in Falkirk and educated at Strathallan School in Perthshire, Scotland. He decided not to complete a degree course at the University of St Andrews, to work in the family timber business and pursue a moderately successful career in motor racing. Eventually, Sharpe completed his degree at the University of Edinburgh and trained to become an English teacher, teaching at several schools in Edinburgh. Whilst teaching he developed an interest in theatre and eventually left teaching to concentrate on writing and directing.

== Actor, director and playwright ==
=== Theatre Co-op and Fifth Estate Theatre Company ===
In 1986 he formed the Theatre Co-op with Patrick Evans. This enabled Sharpe to express his creative talent and work outwith the mainstream, where he thrived. The company was run on a shoestring budget and had little significant funding. Despite these constraints the company received considerable attention for its high standard of writing and production.

In 1988 the company performed Sharpe's first play, The Burgher's Tale, which received an enthusiastic response from critics and the audience alike. Sharpe's Herald Scotland obituary described the play as follows: "The Burgher's Tale is a biting political and social satire inspired by his study of commedia del arte. He explores art's relationship with politics and the state and his conviction that art, in the fullness of its definition, represents the only potential salvation for an increasingly fractured and divisive world". Sharpe would continue to develop this thesis with Playing Sarajevo and Heart's Delight, the last of the trilogy.

Following the demise of the Theatre Co-op, Sharpe co-founded The Fifth Estate Theatre Company with Sandy Neilson. The company was based at the Netherbow Theatre in Edinburgh from 1990 until 1996. During this period the company performed 26 productions including several of Sharpe's own plays. At various times he was either writer, actor and or director. The company won several awards and received both critical and popular acclaim during its existence. Sharpe also served a term as Chairman of the Scottish Society of Playwrights.

In 1991 the company performed The Archive of Countess D adapted by Sharpe from the short story by Alexis Apukhtine. In the same year they produced We, Charles XII by Bernard Da Costa, which Sharpe also translated and adapted. In 1993 Sharpe had critical success with The Last of the Lairds, adapted from the novel by John Galt. The play went on to have three further productions. In 1994 they performed an updated version of The Burgher's Tale from the original 1988 script. Once again the play received good reviews. In 1995 the company produced Playing Sarajevo, receiving mixed reviews. Heart's Delight has yet to be produced.

=== Other credits ===
From the mid 1980s, Sharpe performed in several stage and radio roles. In November 1988, he appeared in the Royal Lyceum Theatre Company's adaptation of William Shakespeare's, As you like it, in Edinburgh. Sharpe also appeared in The Weavers, a co-production between the Tramway Theatre in Glasgow and the Dundee Repertory Theatre, performed in both cities. In April 1998 he had a role in The Mill Lavvies, also performed by The Dundee Repertory Theatre. In September 1998, Sharpe performed in a BBC Radio 4 play called The Hydro and in September 2000 a radio adaptation of Joseph Conrad's, Falk.

=== Film and television ===
In 1990 Sharpe had a small role in the Scottish detective series, Taggart, the first of four episodes he would appear in over ten years. In 1992 he had roles in two UK TV series; The Good Guys and Crime Story. The following year Sharpe had a role in Strathblair and in 1994 The Tales of Para Handy. In 1995 he appeared in Doctor Finlay and the film, The Near Room which was James McAvoy's acting debut aged fifteen. Sharpe's next role was in The Witch's Daughter and later in 1996 he appeared in Tartan Shorts:The Star, broadcast by BBC Scotland and written by John Milarky. In 2001 he had a small role in the Monarch of the Glen. His final acting role was in the 2002 film The Magdalene Sisters. Sharpe died in 2004 from motor neuron disease.

== Works ==
=== Writer ===
| Year | Title | Notes |
|---|---|---|
| 1988 | The Burgher's Tale | First produced by Theatre Co-Op at the Netherbow Theatre |
| 1991 | The Archive of Countess D | Adapted from the short story by Alexis Apukhtine |
| 1991 | We, Charles XII | Translated and adapted from 'Nous, Charles XII' by Bernard Da Costa |
| 1993 | The Last of the Lairds | Adapted from the novel by John Galt |
| 1995 | Playing Sarajevo | |
| | Heart's Delight | |
