= Pitlochry Festival Theatre =

Theatre in Pitlochry, Scotland

- Interactive map of Pitlochry Festival Theatre
- Location: Port-na-Craig, Pitlochry, Scotland
- Coordinates: 56°41′53″N 3°44′07″W
- Capacity: 544 (Auditorium); 175 (Studio)
- Type: Theatre
- Public transit: Pitlochry railway station

Construction
- Opened: 19 May 1951 (original Tent Theatre); 1981 (Current Building); 2022 (Studio)
- Architects: James Dunbar-Nasmith (Auditorium); Suzie Bridges Architects (Studio)

Website
- pitlochryfestivaltheatre.com

The Pitlochry Festival Theatre is a large performing arts theatre located in the town and burgh of Pitlochry in Perth and Kinross, Scotland. The idea of a performance space in the area was conceived in the late 1940s by John Stewart, a leading promoter of amateur dramatics in Glasgow. The theatre officially opened on 19 May 1951. Alan Cumming is the theatre's current Artistic Director.

== History ==
After the decline and subsequent closure of his Park Theatre Club in the West End of Glasgow, John Stewart decided to plan a theatre site in the Knockendarroch area of Pitlochry. However Stewart's plans were met with little success as building licences were refused by the Ministry of Works.

Following this setback, Stewart had the idea of founding a tent-style theatre. After viewing the wet weather tent of London's Regent's Park and the Birmingham Arena Theatre, Stewart searched for the tents' construction company in Walsall, eventually investing in one for a theatre space for Pitlochry.

After construction work and promotion by the Scottish Tourist Board, the theatre officially opened on 19 May 1951. In his opening address, the chairman of the board and later Secretary of State for Scotland Tom Johnston said, "This theatre is a monument to one man's courage, one man's persistence, and one man's great faith."

After 30 years of use and regular incidents of weather damage to the tents, it was decided in the late 1970s that the tent structure would be renovated and stabilised. Construction work began on a new theatre building at the current site, and eventually on 19 May 1981 the new theatre building was opened on the 30th anniversary of John Stewart's first tent.

=== Artistic Directors ===
- John Stewart (1951-1957)
- Kenneth Ireland (1957-1983)
- Sue Wilson (1984-1986)
- Clive Perry (1986-2002)
- John Durnin (2003-2018)
- Elizabeth Newman (2018-2024)
- Alan Cumming (2024-present)

Prior to 2003, Artistic Directors at Pitlochry were referred to as Festival Directors.

== Modern day ==
Traditionally, the theatre offered a rep season through the summer months, enabling visitors to see several plays within a few days; the theatre asserted that "No other UK theatre attempts this extraordinary feat" and that the nearest similar offering is in Canada. For example, the 2018 season offered Chicago the musical, Jim Cartwright's The Rise and Fall of Little Voice, J. M. Barrie's Quality Street, Tom Stoppard's Travesties, Rodney Ackland's Before the Party, and Rona Munro's The Last Witch.

In 2014, it was announced that the Pitlochry Festival Theatre would undergo a £25 million expansion of the current building. Plans were made to have the expansion completed and opened for the theatre's 70th anniversary in 2021. The work was delayed by the COVID-19 pandemic. During the theatre's closures in 2020, work was undertaken to enhance the outdoor performance spaces, including refurbishment of the amphitheatre and the construction of a bandstand. The theatre reopened in August 2022 with a refurbished foyer and a new 175-seat studio space designed by Suzie Bridges Architects.

In 2025, Cumming announced that he would be ending the repertory season in favour of producing shorter runs at the theatre, followed by tours or transfers to other venues.

Above the theatre, a wooded hillside hosts an Explorers Garden which offers "a tribute to Scotland’s plant hunters". Red squirrels can be seen at times in the garden.

== Leon Sinden Awards ==
The Leon Sinden Awards are awarded annually to two performers appearing in the theatre's summer rep season. Previous recipients include Steven McNicoll and George Rae. They were founded by and named after the actor Leon Sinden, who spent eight seasons working at the theatre between 1965 and 1994, with the inaugural ceremony taking place in 1995. The award was specifically created to honour actors appearing in supporting roles. Those who have won twice previously are ineligible. Winners are selected by an audience vote, with the result announced at the end of the season on the main stage. There were no awards in 2020 and 2021, as the theatre did not present a full rep season those years due to the COVID-19 pandemic, nor were there awards in 2000, although it was still counted as the 6th award season. Traditionally, the two awards were given to the "Best Supporting Actor" and the "Best Supporting Actress", but since 2024 the awards have been presented as "Best Supporting Performance" with no distinction made between genders.

=== Winners ===
Year	Winner 1	Notes	Winner 2	Notes
1995 (1st)	Martyn James		Claire Richards	
1996 (2nd)	Martyn James		Rona Anderson	
1997 (3rd)	Russell Hunter		Una McLean	
1998 (4th)	Roy Boutcher		Patricia England	
1999 (5th)	Martin Hodgson		Deirdre Davis	
2000 (6th)	No award		No award	
2001 (7th)	Jimmy Chisholm		Janet Michael	
2002 (8th)	Michael McKenzie		Helen Logan	
2003 (9th)	Steven McNicoll	For his role as Andy in The Steamie	Janet Devigne	
2004 (10th)	Samuel James		Janet Michael	
2005 (11th)	Hywel Morgan		Kezia Burrows	
2006 (12th)	Robin Harvey Edwards		Jacqueline Dutoit	Won for the role of Lady Pontefract in A Woman of No Importance
2007 (13th)	Rory Murray		Joanne Cummins	
2008 (14th)	Christian Edwards	Won for his role in She Stoops to Conquer	Luisa Prosser	
2009 (15th)	Alan Steele	For the role of Frazer in Good Things	Isabelle Joss	For the role of Marjorie in Good Things
2010 (16th)	George Rae		Kate Quinnell	
2011 (17th)	Fred Broom		Kate Quinnell	
2012 (18th)	Dougal Lee		Emily Altneu	
2013 (19th)	Joseph Mann		Jacqueline Dutoit	Won for the role of Duchess of Berwick in Lady Windermere's Fan
2014 (20th)	Scott Armstrong		Romana Abercromby	
2015 (21st)	Dougal Lee		Helen Logan	
2016 (22nd)	Greg Powrie		Gemma McElhinney	
2017 (23rd)	Mark Faith		Rebecca Elise	
2018 (24th)	Alan Mirren		Fiona Wood	
2019 (25th)	David Rankine		Fiona Wood	
2020	No award		No award	
2021	No Award		No Award	
2022 (26th)	Richard Colvin		Nalan Burgess	
2023 (27th)	Robbie Scott		Rachael McAllister	
2024 (28th)	David Rankine	Won for multi-rolling in Nan Sheperd: Naked and Unashamed First awards presented as "Best Supporting Performance"	Luke Thornton	Won for the role of Willard in Footlose First awards presented as "Best Supporting Performance"
2025 (29th)	Chris Coxon	For playing Clown 1 in The 39 Steps	Alyson Orr	For playing Jean in Sunshine on Leith

== Notable productions ==
The following notable productions premiered at the theatre:

- I'll Be Seeing You (2026)
- Supernova (2027)
