= Daniel Jackson (playwright) =

Scottish playwright (born 1980)

Daniel Craig Jackson (born 1980), also known as D. C. Jackson, is a Scottish playwright.

== Career ==
His first full-length play The Wall premiered at the Tron Theatre in Glasgow in 2008. It was produced by Borderline Theatre Company and was nominated for several awards including the Best New Play at the Critics' Awards for Theatre in Scotland and the Saltire Society Scottish First Book of the year. The sequel The Ducky was also produced by Borderline Theatre Company and toured in 2009. In 2010, he finished his Stewarton Trilogy with The chilly brae. His play My Romantic History (which starred Iain Robertson) won a Scotsman Fringe First at the 2010 Edinburgh Festival and sold out its run at the Bush Theatre in London. He also took part in the Bush Theatre's 2011 project Sixty Six Books, to which he contributed a piece based upon a book of the King James Bible. In 2012, Jackson's play The Marriage of Figaro, an adaptation of the stage comedy by Beaumarchais and later opera by Wolfgang Amadeus Mozart was premiered at the Royal Lyceum Theatre, Edinburgh. In 2013, Jackson's play Threeway premiered at the Edinburgh Festival Fringe, Edinburgh. In 2014, another of Jackson's works, Kill Johnny Glendenning, received its premiere at the Lyceum before transferring to Glasgow's Citizens Theatre.

== Personal life ==
D.C. Jackson's partner is the Scottish television, stage and film actress Alison O'Donnell; they have two children. They met when O'Donnell played the lead role in Jackson's play My Romantic History at the Traverse in Edinburgh, and later became a couple.

== Works ==
- 2008 The Wall, Borderline Theatre Company / Tron Theatre
- 2009 The Ducky, Borderline Theatre Company
- 2010 My Romantic History, Bush Theatre
- 2010 The Chooky Brae, Borderline Theatre Company
- 2012 The Marriage of Figaro, Royal Lyceum Theatre, Edinburgh
- 2013 Threeway, Pleasance Theatre, Edinburgh
- 2014 Kill Johnny Glendenning, Royal Lyceum Theatre, Edinburgh
