= The Kalahari Typing School for Men =

Novel by Alexander McCall Smith

- First edition
- Author: Alexander McCall Smith
- Language: English
- Series: The No. 1 Ladies' Detective Agency series
- Genre: Detective, Mystery novel
- Publisher: Polygon Books
- Publication date: 2002
- Publication place: Scotland
- Media type: Print (Hardback & Paperback), Audio (Cassette & CD)
- Pages: 191 pp
- ISBN: 1-4000-3136-2
- OCLC: 49902099
- Dewey Decimal: 823/.914 21
- LC Class: PR6063.C326 M67 2002
- Preceded by: Morality for Beautiful Girls (2001)
- Followed by: The Full Cupboard of Life (2004)

The Kalahari Typing School for Men is the fourth in The No. 1 Ladies' Detective Agency series of novels by Alexander McCall Smith, set in Gaborone, Botswana, and featuring the Motswana protagonist Precious Ramotswe.

== Plot summary ==
Mma Ramotswe talks with her fiance Mr JLB. Matekoni about the future of her assistant, Mma Makutsi, who seems to have difficulty finding suitable men. Later the two women discuss the same topic. At Mr JLB Matekoni's garage, the younger apprentice changes, no longer always looking at girls. He has found religion. When Mma Ramotswe arrives at home, both of her foster children seem down, with Motholeli and Puso being the subject of mainly verbal bullying. Motheleli seems to get over this, while Puso projects his anger at his foster parents.

Mma Makutsi opens a typing school just for men, because men do not enroll at the Secretarial College because they do not want to be bettered by women, though they need to type in their jobs. She obtains typewriters from her alma mater, the Botswana Secretarial College, and finds a place to teach at the younger apprentice's church. This business is very successful, filling three sessions with one advertisement. Mma Makutsi gets involved with one of her students, Mr Bernard Selelipeng, a married man passing himself off as divorced. Mr Selelipeng is forced to break off with Mma Makutsi, as his wife consulted with Mma Ramotswe about her husband cheating on her. The wife mentions that she first went to the Satisfaction Guaranteed Agency, but got unsatisfactory results there.

To address the problem with Puso, Mma Ramotswe consults the matron Mma Silvia Potokwani at the orphanage. Mma Potokwani advises having Mr J.L.B Matekoni act as more of a father to the boy. Mr J.L.B. Matekoni does this, with favourable results.

Mr Molefelo approaches Mma Ramotswe for a delicate matter. He is a prosperous civil engineer in Lobatse who is also the proprietor of a hotel and landowner with an ostrich ranch. As a young student at the Botswana Technical College in Gaborone, he had a girlfriend whom he had made pregnant. In order to pay for an abortion (which is illegal in Botswana) he had to pay 100 pula (about $20). As he had no way to get money, he stole a radio from his host family, the Tsolamoseses. After the abortion, he got angry with his girlfriend and broke up with her. He wants to make amends with both. Mma Ramotswe finds them so he can do this.

A rival detective agency, called the Satisfaction Guaranteed Agency, has come to town. The business is owned by Cephas Buthelezi, "Ex-CID, Ex-New York, Ex-cellent!". He is of Zulu origin. His advertising is derogatory towards the No. 1 Agency in a sideways manner; he implies that one needs a man to do detective work properly. However, his hubris is repaid, as he tells Mma Ramotswe that he is giving up the business.

The story ends with a picnic, attended by the apprentices, Mma Ramotswe, Mma Makutsi, Mr JLB Matekoni, Rra and Mma Potokwani, Mma Boko, and Mr Molefelo and his family.

== Chapters ==
1. How to Find a Man
2. Learn to Drive with Jesus
3. To Kill a Hoopoe
4. Trust Your Affairs to a Man
5. The Talking Cure
6. Old Typewriters Gathering Dust
7. What Mr. Molefelo Did
8. The Typewriters and a Prayer Meeting
9. The Civil Service
10. The Kalahari Typing School for Men Throws Open its Doors (to Men)
11. Mma Ramotswe Goes to a Small village to the South of Gaborone
12. The Miracle that was Wrought at Tlokweng Road Speedy Motors
13. Tea at the Orphan Farm
14. Mr. Bernard Selelipeng
15. A Disgruntled Client
16. Mma Ramotswe Gets a Flat Tyre; Mma Makutsi Goes to the Cinema with Mr. Bernard Selelipeng
17. Finding Tebogo
18. A Radio is a Small Thing
19. No. 42 Limpopo Court
20. Two Awkward Men Satisfactorily Disposed of
