= King of Shadows =

1999 historical novel by Susan Cooper

- First edition (US)
- Author: Susan Cooper
- Cover artist: John Clapp
- Genre: Children's historical novel, timeslip fantasy
- Publisher: Margaret K. McElderry, US, Bodley Head, UK
- Publication date: October 1999, November 1999
- Publication place: US, UK
- Media type: Print (hardcover)
- Pages: 186 pp, 181 pp
- Awards: None
- ISBN: 0-689-82817-9
- OCLC: 40444020
- LC Class: PZ7.C7878 Ki 1999

King of Shadows is a children's historical novel by Susan Cooper published in 1999 by Penguin In the United Kingdom. It was a finalist for both the Carnegie Medal and the Guardian Children's Fiction Prize.

== Plot ==
Nathan 'Nat' Field is a young boy from Greenville, North Carolina. He is recruited by Arby, a theatrical director, to join the Company of Boys. They intend to produce A Midsummer's Night's Dream and Julius Caesar in London, at the re-built Globe Theatre, just as in Shakespeare's time. Nat is chosen to be Puck in a Midsummer Night's Dream and Pindarus in Julius Caesar. As he is going to their first rehearsal he feels odd. He returns to the house in which he is staying, feels ill and goes to bed early. He wakes up in a different room with a boy he doesn't recognise talking to him in a heavy Elizabethan accent, who says he thought he had the plague and is relieved to see him better. Nat realises he has travelled back 400 years in time, to the year 1599, when the Globe Theatre was first built. He meets William Shakespeare and acts with him in the play he had rehearsed for in his own time, and experiences the plays as they were originally intended. Before Nat knows it, he is back in the hospital bed, awake and unsure whether what he experienced was real. Later, Rachel Levin and Gil Warmun, his co-actors from the present time, try to find out who he was 400 years ago.

Synopsis

'Nathan Field, a talented young actor, arrives at the newly rebuilt Globe theatre in London to play Puck in A Midsummer's Night's dream. As rehearsals begin, eerie echoes of the past begin to haunt Nat and he falls ill with a mysterious sickness. When he wakes, Nat finds himself in 1599, an actor at the original Globe - and his co-star is none other than the King of Shadows himself: William Shakespeare. Nat's new life is full of excitement, danger, and the passionate friendship that he has longed for since the tragic death of his parents. But why has he been sent to the past - and is he trapped there forever?

== Characters ==
Nathan 'Nat' Field, the main character of the story.

1999

Arby, Gil Warmun, Rachel Levin, Mr. Fisher, Aunt Jen, Pudding Face, Eric, Ferdie, David Roper, Ray Danza, Joe Wilson, Alan Wong.

1599

Richard Burbage, William Shakespeare, Roper, Queen Elizabeth I, Will Kempe, Richard Mulcaster, Harry, Sam and Henry Condell

== Characters as characters in the play ==
1999

NEIGAA

== Adaptations ==
King of Shadows was adapted for the stage in 2005 and first performed by the New York State Theatre Institute (NYSTI) starring P. J. Verhoest as Nat, David Bunce as Shakespeare, John Romeo as Burbage, and Aaron Marquise as Roper.

== See also ==
- Shakespearean English
- Time travel in fiction
