= Stellar Quines Theatre Company =

Scottish women's theatre company

Stellar Quines is an intersectional feminist theatre company and charity based in Kirkcaldy, Fife. The company produces original theatre, creates with communities and support artists, all working towards a gender equal Scotland. The name Stellar Quines is a combination of two old Scots words: Stellar, meaning 'starry', and Quines, meaning 'women'.

== History ==
Stellar Quines was established in 1993 by Gerda Stevenson and a group of theatre practitioners to address the lack of opportunities for women in theatre. The creation of Stellar Quines was a direct response to Gerda’s experiences working with celebrated British feminist theatre company Monstrous Regiment and her vision for Scotland to have a theatre company that would consciously create opportunities for women in all areas of production.

In 2000, Muriel Romanes became Artistic Director. As one of the original co-founders of the company, she had an outstanding reputation as a director and a performer in Scottish theatre, supporting new writers and providing opportunities for women in theatre to develop in other creative areas. This included the Rehearsal Room programme to develop new plays. She also nurtured a special relationship with Quebec, notably presenting the triple Fringe First winning Jennifer Tremblay Trilogy.

In 2016, Muriel was succeeded by Jemima Levick. With a particular commitment to equality and diversity, Jemima broadened the organisation’s reach in sector development and community engagement by establishing new programmes of work.

Jemima produced and directed a wide breadth of collaborative work, co-producing shows with National Theatre Scotland, The Lyceum, Citizens Theatre, Imaginate, Pearlfisher, Dundee Rep and Scottish Dance Theatre.

Jemima left Stellar Quines to join Play Pie and a Pint in 2021 as their Artistic Director, with Caitlin Skinner joining the company that April. Caitlin’s vision is for an intersectional feminist theatre company which invites action through a collaborative programme of work. This includes touring shows, engaging communities, supporting creatives and campaigns all with the aim of achieving greater equality.

In 2024 the company relocated from the City of Edinburgh to Kirkcaldy, Fife in a move to decentralise arts and cultural activity out of the nation’s urban centres, collaborate with communities and provide quality opportunities for local people to engage with the performing arts.

== Productions ==
The company’s first production was Night Sky by Susan Yankowitz, directed by Lynn Bains. It toured to Aberdeen, Ayr, Glasgow, St Andrews and Edinburgh during the spring of 1994.

Other key productions include:

- Refuge by Janet Paisley, directed by Gerda Stevenson. The play received the Peggy Ramsay Award for the development of new writing.
- The 1963 novella by Muriel Spark, The Girls of Slender Means, was adapted for a stage for a production by the Stellar Quines in August 2009.
- The Jennifer Tremblay Trilogy, a trio of plays directed by Muriel Romanes and written by Jennifer Tremblay (The List, The Deliverance and The Carousel). After producing and touring each show to critical acclaim, the trilogy undertook a full run at the 2015 Edinburgh Fringe Festival.
- The 306: Day by Oliver Emmanuel, directed by Jemima Levick in association with the National Theatre of Scotland and Perth Theatre. This was the second in a trilogy of plays responding to the centenary of World War 1.
- Through the Mud by Apphia Campbell, directed by Caitlin Skinner. The play tells the story of Black Panther Assata Shakur and a college student at the start of the Black Lives Matter movement. The show performed at the Royal Lyceum Theatre, before embarking on an Edinburgh Fringe 2024 run, a 2025 tour of Scotland, Brazil and Mexico.
- Frankie Stein by Julia Taudevin, with music and lyrics by Bethany Tennick and directed by Caitlin Skinner marks the first show since the companies move to Fife. A feminist adaptation of Mary Shelley’s Frankenstein looking at AI, gender justice and community. The show premiered at the Lochgelly Centre in April 2025.
