= Borderline Theatre Company =

Borderline Theatre company is a touring theatre company based in Ayr, Scotland.

Its alumni include the actors Billy Connolly and Robbie Coltrane. Recent successes include the award-winning, critically acclaimed plays The Wall and The Ducky by D C Jackson.
