= Fifth Estate Theatre Company =

The Fifth Estate Theatre Company was based at the Netherbow Theatre in Edinburgh, Scotland. The company was established by Allan Sharpe and Sandy Neilson, performing 26 productions between 1990 and 1996. Fifth Estate won several awards and received much popular and critical acclaim. The company toured many of their productions to theatres around the United Kingdom, including Hampstead Theatre, Perth Theatre, Dundee Repertory Theatre and the Tron Theatre in Glasgow.

Documents relating to Fifth Estate have been archived at the National Library of Scotland.

== Productions ==
The company's main productions were:

- The Blasphemer by George Rosie, (1990).
- Buchan of Tweedsmuir by Trevor Royle, (1991).
- Carlucco and the Queen of Hearts by George Rosie, (1991).
- The Archive of Countess D, adapted by Allan Sharpe from the short story by Alexis Apukhtine, (1991).
- We, Charles XII by Bernard Da Costa, translated and adapted by Allan Sharpe, (1991).
- The Jesuit by Donald Campbell, (1992).
- The Ballachulish Beat by Cecil P Taylor, (1992).
- Country Dance by James Kennaway, (1992).
- Kepler by Robert Forrest, (1992).
- Seven Characters Out of the Dream by Joan Ure, (1992).
- Lambrusco Nights by Kathleen Crombie, (1992).
- The Consul of Butterflies by Bernard Da Costa, translated and adapted by Lorna Irvine, (1992).
- Where Love Steps In, (La Serva Amorosa) by Carlo Goldoni, translated and adapted by Antonia Stott and Marjory Greig (1992/1993).
- The Ould Fella by Donald Campbell, (1993).
- The Straw Chair by Sue Glover, (1993).
- The Last of the Lairds by Allan Sharpe, from the novel by John Galt, (1993).
- The Scapegoat by C B Paton, (1993).
- The Burgher’s Tale by Allan Sharpe, (1994).
- It Had To Be You by George Rosie, (1994).
- Lucia by Robert Forrest, (1994).
- Playing Sarajevo by Allan Sharpe, (1995).
- Nancy Sleekit by Donald Campbell, (1995).
- Howard’s Revenge by Donald Campbell, (1995).
- The Albright Fellow by Stanley Eveling, (1995–6).
- Nova by Robert Forrest, (1996).
- Better Days, Better Knights by Stanley Eveling, (no date).
