= Southern Shakespeare Festival =

Theatre festival in Tallahassee, Florida

The Southern Shakespeare Festival is an annual festival in Tallahassee, Florida, United States, organized by the Southern Shakespeare Company. The festival's first incarnation existed from 1995 to 2000. In 2012, a group of scholars saw an opportunity to revive the free outdoor festival at the award-winning Cascades Park.

== History ==
The Southern Shakespeare Festival was founded by American entrepreneur Michael J. Trout in November 1994 as the Florida Theater Project. In the summer of 1995, Michael Trout organized a touring company, led by David Klein. Words... Words... Words: An Evening of Shakespeare toured local theaters, regional high schools, and community arts centers.

Trout then approached Florida State University Dean Emeritus Richard G. Fallon for his help to establish a free Shakespeare in the park festival, which Trout modeled after Joseph Papp's New York free Shakespeare in the Park festivals. The Tallahassee festival and Renaissance fair ran from 1996 to 2000 as an open-air, free festival and Renaissance fair located in the downtown area behind Tallahassee's City Hall in Kleman Plaza.

The inaugural Shakespeare in the Park production in 1996, A Midsummer's Nights Dream, directed by Russian director Irina Brown, drew over 30,000 spectators according to the local newspaper, the Tallahassee Democrat. It is recognized as one of the most successful free-theater festivals in Tallahassee with over 80,000 spectators and over 20,000 students benefitting from its educational programming during its 1996–2000 existence.

In 2012, the Southern Shakespeare Festival was revived thanks to Dr. Kevin Carr, Dr. Brent Griffin, and a dedicated group of Tallahassee theater artisans, most notably Laura W. Johnson, Catherine Leonard, and Lanny Thomas. The Adderley Amphitheater at Cascades Park is the home of the revitalized festival, and appropriately, its first production, which ran April 17–19, 2015, was A Midsummer Night's Dream, directed by Lanny Thomas, and starring special guest AEA artist Jef Canter as Nick Bottom.

== Productions ==
- 1995 – Southern Shakespeare Festival Touring Company. Words... Words... Words...: An Evening of Shakespeare, written and directed by David Klein
- 1996 – A Midsummer Night's Dream, directed by Irina Brown and starring UK actor Jack Klaff, Wil Johnson, and US actress Jennifer Harper.
- 1997 – The Taming of the Shrew, directed by Ian Wooldridge, starring Wil Johnson and Brigid Zengeni
- 1998 – As You Like It, featuring original music by Jason Chimonides
- 1999 – Merry Wives of Windsor
- 2000 – The Tempest (last production of the original festival)
- 2015 – A Midsummer Night's Dream, starring Jef Canter and Laura W. Johnson
- 2016 – A Comedy of Errors, directed by Lanny Thomas and starring Melanie Mays
- 2017 – As You Like It, directed by Lanny Thomas and starring Terry Wells, Devon Glover, and Laura W. Johnson
- 2018 – Romeo and Juliet, directed by Michael Richey and starring Renee O'Connor, Miles Muir, Melanie Applegate, and Terry Wells
- 2019 – Macbeth, directed by James Alexander Bond and starring Marc Singer.
- 2020 – NONE (cancelled by COVID-19 pandemic)
- 2021 - Twelfth Night, directed by James Alexander Bond and featuring Hal Sparks as Malvolio and Daniel Stock as Sir Toby Belch.
- 2022 - Much Ado About Nothing, directed by James Alexander Bond and featuring Kevin McDonald of Kids in the Hall as Dogberry.
- 2023 - Antony and Cleopatra, directed by James Alexander Bond and featuring two-time Emmy-nominated actor Kelsey Scott as Cleopatra.
- 2024 - The Winter's Tale, directed by Shanara Gabrielle and featuring actor Nathan Darrow as Leontes.

== Media articles ==
- Rise of Southern Shakespeare Festival – Montgomery Advertiser, Sunday Nov. 22, 1998
- Relationship Advice from Ol' Will – Break Magazine, May 7–13, 1997
- Southern Shakespeare Festival to Return in 2015 – Tallahassee Democrat, Friday, June 6, 2014
- A Look at the Music of Shakespeare – WFSU, January 30, 2015
- Tallahassee’s Shakespeare Revival – Tallahassee Magazine, March–April 2015
- Laura Johnson helps re-set the stage for Shakespeare – Tallahassee Democrat, Wednesday, March 18, 2015
- Southern Shakespeare Festival Presents A Midsummer Night's Dream – Tallahassee Downtown

== Local government support ==
The Southern Shakespeare Company is greatly supported by local and state government organizations including the City of Tallahassee, Leon County Tourist Development Council, Council of Cultural Arts (COCA), State of Florida Division of Cultural Affairs, and a long-standing partnership with Tallahassee State College.
