= Lynching in Leon County =

Between the years of 1897 and 1937, four confirmed lynchings took place in Leon County, Florida. On January 23, 1897, Pierson Taylor was abducted from the county jail by a mob, then hanged and shot. In May 1909, after being accused of murder and condemned to hang, Mick Morris was abducted from the jail and lynched by a white mob. In the summer of 1937, African American teenagers Richard Ponder and Ernest Hawkins were abducted from the county jail and lynched.

== Pierson Taylor ==
Pierson Taylor was a young African-American man. On January 16, 1897, Taylor was accused of assaulting a woman named Emma Apthorp after he asked for a ride on her wagon and was denied. Taylor was later arrested by local authorities and jailed after a preliminary trial.

On the morning of January 25, 1897, a mob of armed, masked men threatened the jail's cook to unlock the outer gates and used hammers to break into Taylor's cell. They then hanged Taylor on a tree in the jail yard and shot him twice.

The county sheriff and the deputy were unable to locate the perpetrators.

== Mick Morris ==
Mick Morris was an African-American man who was lynched in Leon County in 1909. On March 29, Morris was arrested and charged with murdering Sheriff William M. Langston of Leon County. On May 14, 1909, Mick Morris was sentenced to hang after being convicted of first degree murder.

On the morning of June 6, 1909, five days before his scheduled execution, an armed mob abducted Morris from his jail cell. They beat him unconscious, hanged him on a nearby tree, and shot his body. After the mob had left, hundreds visited the jail and saw Morris' body.

Following the lynching, Governor Albert W. Gilchrist called for an amendment to the Florida constitution, arguing that Morris' lynching was a consequence of adjoined or delayed trials.

== Richard Hawkins & Ernest Ponder ==
Richard Hawkins and Ernest Ponder were two African-American teenagers who were lynched during the summer of 1937. Both were around 18 years old. On July 19, 1937, Hawkins and Ponder were arrested by city patrolman J.V. Kelley during their robbery of a local establishment. They were arrested after allegedly stabbing Kelley, and were placed in the county jail. Both confessed to the robbery, but blamed the other for the stabbing.

On the morning of July 20, 1937, four masked men entered the Tallahassee police headquarters and threatened Police Officer Harry Fairbanks to obtain the keys to a strong box, which held individual cell keys. Hawkins and Ponder were then abducted from their cell and taken three miles east of Tallahassee along the Jacksonville highway. At around 7:30 a.m., their bodies were found with five placards next to them. According to the county judge, the two had been shot somewhere between fifteen and twenty times.

The placards read:

"His last crime"

"This is the beginning, who is next"

"This is your warning"

"Negroes remember you may be next"

"Warning, this is what will happen to all negroes that harm white people."

Following the lynching, Sheriff Frank Stoutamire employed a night guard for the county jail, and limited which employees would have the keys to the county jail.

City officials declined to launch an independent investigation of city and county law officers, despite lacking a verdict from the coroner's jury at the time. Although the bullets and placards at the scene were sent to the Department of Justice in Washington, D.C., the Federal Bureau of Investigation only reported that the bullets of city and county policemen did not match those which had killed Hawkins and Ponder. On August 3, the coroner's jury concluded that it was not possible to determine the identities of those responsible for Hawkins and Ponders' lynching.

In response to the lynching, Governor Fred P. Cone made several public statements, including "I'm going to do everything I can to get whoever did this. It looks like a lot of carelessness here by somebody" and "This was not a lynching. It was a murder." The latter statement drew backlash from the N.A.A.C.P. and black newspapers across America, who maintained that the event was a lynching.

== Legacy ==
On July 17, 2021, a historical marker was dedicated in Cascades Park, Tallahassee, Florida, remembering the four victims. Their names are also engraved on a pillar in the National Memorial for Peace and Justice, in Montgomery, Alabama.
