= Cascade Park =

Cascade Park may refer to,

- Cascade Park (amusement park)
- Cascade Park West, Washington
- Cascade Park East, Washington
- Cascade Park, New Castle, Pennsylvania
- Cascade Park in Duluth
- Cascade Park in Yerevan (Monuments of Yerevan#Cascade)

== See also ==
- Cascades Park (disambiguation)
