= Cascades Park =

Cascades Park can refer to:

- Cascades Park (Tallahassee) - a park in Tallahassee, Florida
- Cascades Park (Michigan) - a park in southern Michigan

== See also ==
- Cascade Park (disambiguation)
- North Cascades National Park
