= Lake Munson =

Lake in Florida, United States

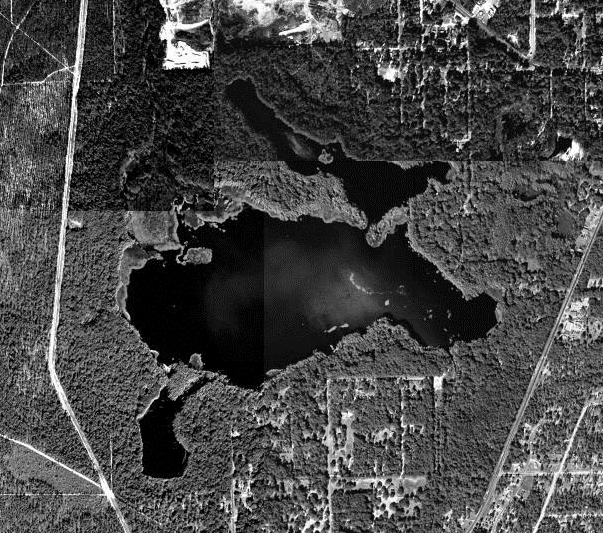

- Location within Florida Location within the United States

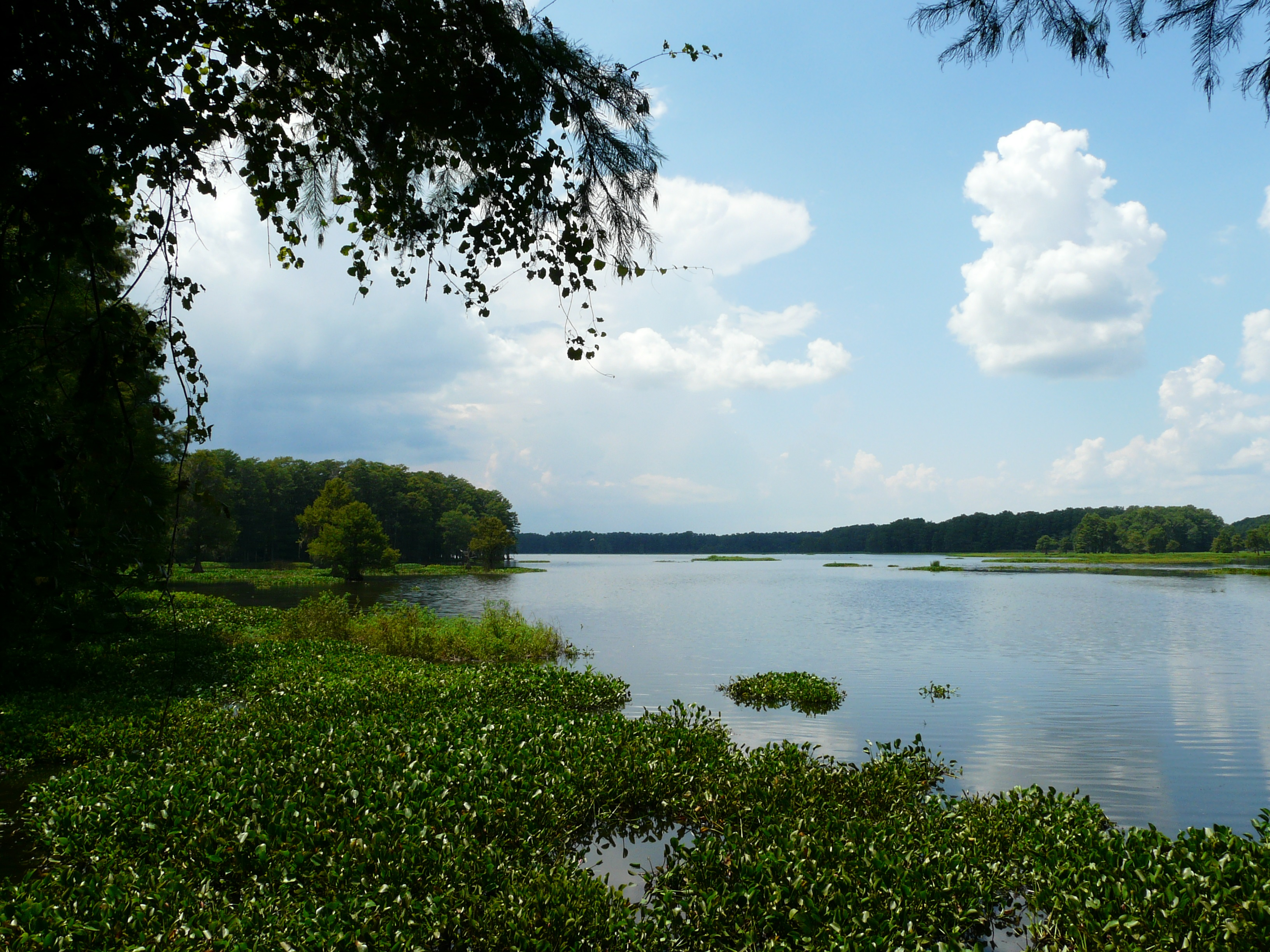
- View from observation dock
- Location: Leon County, Florida
- Coordinates: 30°22′08″N 84°18′29″W
- Type: Impoundment
- Primary inflows: Munson Slough
- Primary outflows: Munson Slough
- Catchment area: 69.3 mi^{2} (179.5 km^{2})
- Basin countries: United States
- Surface area: 255 acres (103 ha)
- Settlements: Tallahassee

Lake Munson is a shallow reservoir on the southeast side of Tallahassee in Leon County, Florida.

Historically known as Munson's Mill Pond as early as the 1840s, in 1950 a permanent dam was constructed. From 1934 to 1984, Lake Munson received outflow from the Tallahassee waste water system, leading in 1982 to the Florida Department of Environmental Protection classifying the lake as hypereutrophic and as the seventh most degraded lake in Florida.

Cypress and willow trees line the lake, and egrets, wood storks, and limpkin are often found foraging along the shoreline, often on invasive apple snails. Bass fishing in the lake can be excellent, and a boat ramp is provided at the Gil A. Waters Lake Munson Preserve Park, with another located at the dam.

== See also ==
- Capital Cascade Greenway
