= Capital Cascade Greenway =

Park in Tallahassee, Florida

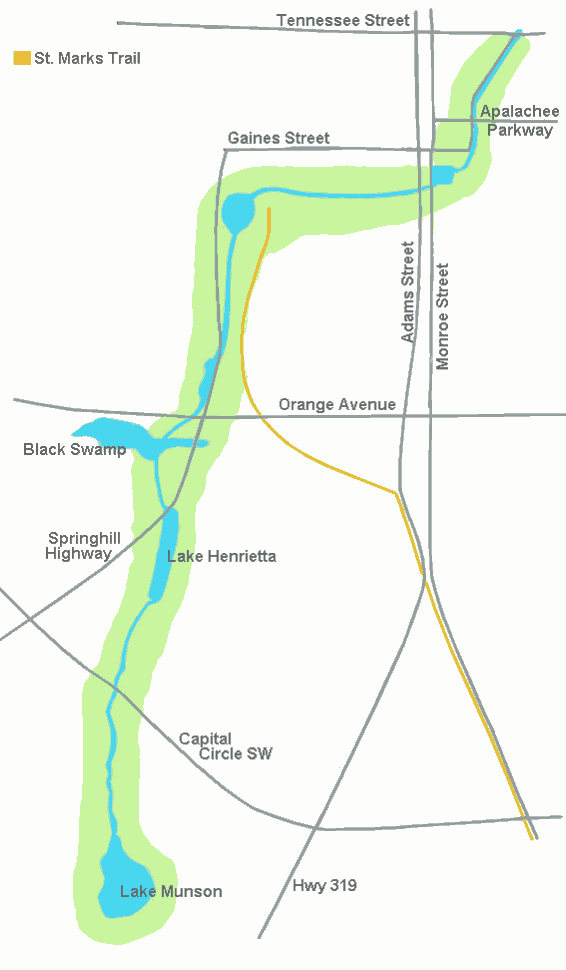
Capital Cascades Greenway project

Capital Cascade Greenway is a 6-mile (9.6 km) long urban greenway in Tallahassee, Florida, designed manage stormwater, enhance natural and cultural heritage, and assist in promoting sustainable development.

== Location ==
The Capital Cascade Greenway passes through downtown Tallahassee following the course of the St. Augustine Branch, a small creek that flows south through Cascades Park and Black Swamp, ending in Lake Munson. The greenway includes both public and private land.

== History ==
The Capital Cascade Greenway was borne of Tallahassee's Blueprint 2000, an initiative to provide efficient, attractive, environmentally responsible stormwater, trail and road projects that help revitalize in-town and southside neighborhoods. It is funded by an extension of the local one-cent sales tax approved by voters in November 2000. The U.S. Environmental Protection Agency and the Department of Community Affairs have invested $7.8 million to the project. The Trust for Public Land is also a partner in the greenway's creation.

== Stormwater ==
The greenway will address stormwater and flooding problems in southern Tallahassee where the St. Augustine Branch basin slopes steeply near downtown. Almost the whole basin is built upon which has increased the amount of impervious surfaces leaving no absorption area for rain.

== Recreation ==
Capital Cascade Greenway will include trails for walking, and biking and link to the St. Mark's Trail, the Bow Tie Trail and the proposed Gopher, Frog and Alligator Trail (GFA.) The greenway will also have parks and playgrounds, businesses and shops and an opportunity to preserve a historic section of Florida's capital city. Parts of the corridor house the Korean War Memorial as well as historic plaques that commemorate the beginnings of Tallahassee and the State of Florida. The corridor is also very close to a number of structures listed on the National Register of Historic Places as well as historic neighborhoods such as Stearns-Mosely.

== Sources ==
- Capital Cascades Trails
- The Trust for Public Land
- Florida Department of Environmental Protection
