= Zinnie Harris =

British playwright, screenwriter and director

Zinnie Harris FRSE
- Born: 23 December 1972 (age 53); Oxford, England
- Occupation: Playwright · Screenwriter · Director
- Writing career
- Language: English
- Period: Contemporary
- Genre: Drama
- Notable work: Further than the Furthest Thing (2000)

Zinnie Harris FRSE is a British playwright, screenwriter and director currently living in Edinburgh. She has been commissioned and produced by the Royal Court Theatre, Royal National Theatre, the National Theatre of Scotland and the Royal Shakespeare Company. Her plays have been translated and performed in many countries across Europe and the globe.

== Early life ==
Harris was born in Oxford and brought up in Scotland. She studied zoology at Oxford University, followed by an M.A. in Theatre Direction at Hull University.

== Themes and context ==
Alongside her original plays, Zinnie Harris has adapted and reworked a number of plays from the western dramatic canon revising female characters from those plays for a more contemporary and sympathetic eye.

Among these adaptations, This Restless House (2017), Harris’ version of Aeschylus’ Oresteia, imagines Clytemnestra not as someone capable of murder, but as a woman more like herself with no intention to kill. Her play Macbeth (an undoing) (February 2022) revisits Lady Macbeth as a ‘complex woman intoxicated by love, power and maternal longing; a woman out of time, fighting against the constraints of medieval patriarchy.’

Similarly, in The Duchess (of Malfi), her adaptation of John Webster’s The Duchess of Malfi, the duchess is given the final word as Webster’s text is rewoven to examine the control and violence of men towards women. In her version of Strindberg’s Miss Julie, Julie is a character with actions of those of a child who is scared of and has been coerced by her father.

Harris’ original plays also put female characters at the centre of the narrative. How to Hold Your Breath (2015) challenges the notion of the ‘everyman’ and Meet me at Dawn (2017) dramatizes the relationship between two women in an examination of grief.

== Career ==
=== 1999–2010 ===
Harris's play By Many Wounds was produced by Hampstead Theatre in 1999, and was shortlisted for the Allied-Domecq and Meyer-Whitworth playwriting awards. Her second play, Further than the Furthest Thing was directed by Irina Brown and co-produced by the Tron Theatre, Glasgow and the Royal National Theatre, London in 2000. The play tells the story of the island of Tristan da Cunha and its inhabitants following a volcanic eruption in 1961. It won an Edinburgh Fringe First Award, the Peggy Ramsay Award, and the John Whiting Award and was shortlisted for the Susan Smith Blackburn Award. The actress Paola Dionisotti won the Evening Standard Best Actress Award for her performance as Mill in the original production. In the same year Harris was shortlisted for the Evening Standard Most Promising Playwright Award. Further than the Furthest Thing has been translated into multiple languages and performed across the globe, often being described as a "modern classic".

Her next play Nightingale and Chase, was produced by the Royal Court Theatre, London 2001 and co-commissioned by Clean Break. A trilogy of plays followed for the Royal Shakespeare Company and the Traverse Theatre Edinburgh - Solstice (2005), Midwinter (2004) and Fall (2008). Midwinter was given an Arts Foundation Fellowship Award for playwriting and shortlisted for the Susan Smith Blackburn Award. It has been performed many times in translation, notably at the Royal Dramatic Theatre in Sweden (2005) and at La Cartoucherie, Paris (2010). Harris adapted and directed Julie, an adaptation of Strindberg's Miss Julie, for the National Theatre of Scotland in 2006, setting the play in Scotland between WWI and WWII. For the Donmar Warehouse, London, she adapted Ibsen's A Doll's House in 2009, relocating the setting to Downing Street in 1909, exploring politics and scandal. By coincidence, Harris's new version opened in the week the Westminster MP's expenses scandal broke in the UK press. Gillian Anderson played the role of Nora, and Christopher Eccleston the part of Kelman (Krogstad). A subsequent production opened at the Lyceum Theatre in Edinburgh in April 2013 in a co-production with the National Theatre of Scotland.

=== 2011–2016 ===
In 2011 the National Theatre of Scotland commissioned and performed The Wheel, directed by Vicky Featherstone. The play won an Edinburgh Fringe First Award, was joint winner of the Amnesty International Freedom of Expression Award, and shortlisted for the Susan Smith Blackburn Award. The Wheel had its U.S. debut at the Steppenwolf Theater of Chicago in 2013, directed by Tina Landau and starring Joan Allen. Harris' play Solstice had its U.S. debut at the Red Orchid Theatre in Chicago in January 2014, directed by Karen Kessler.

Harris has written a number of shorter plays; The Garden for the Traverse Theatre (2010); The Panel for the Tricycle Theatre London for the Women, Power and Politics Season (2010); and From Elsewhere: The Message / From Elsewhere: On the Watch for the Tricycle Theatre as part of The Bomb: a Partial History Season (2012).

In 2015, The Royal Court Theatre produced Harris's new play, How To Hold Your Breath at the Jerwood Theatre Downstairs. It starred Maxine Peake and Michael Schaeffer and was directed by Vicky Featherstone. It imagined the fall of Europe and what would happen to the Western privileged values and outlook if Europeans became the next wave of refugees. It was awarded the Berwin-Lee Award for playwriting in 2016. The play went on to have multiple productions in translation in Turkey, Greece, France and Sweden.

=== 2016–present ===
This Restless House was commissioned and produced by the National Theatre of Scotland and Citizens Theatre in 2016 and directed by Dominic Hill. This trilogy of plays was inspired by Aeschylus' Oresteia and retells the ancient story placing the women at the centre of the story. It was awarded Best New Play at Critics' Awards and was shortlisted for the Susan Smith Blackburn award and Best New Play in the UK Theatre Awards. The Scotsman theatre critic Joyce McMillan described the play as a "trail-blazing 21st century adaptation".

Zinnie Harris had three major new pieces of work presented at the Edinburgh International Festival in 2017. This Restless House was presented again, alongside two other of her plays, putting Harris's work in the centre of Festival Drama programme that year.

Meet me at Dawn was the second of the trio of plays and was presented in a co-production between the EIF and the Traverse Theatre and directed by Orla O'Loughlin. Harris said "Meet me at Dawn is a play about love and grief. I wanted the play to have a relationship with the Orpheus and Eurydice myth, a myth that was created to address the impossibility of death; when someone dies you simply cannot accept that you will not see them again. But what if you could see your loved one one more time? The non-naturalistic form of theatre means you can imagine a bit of magic dust and give that possibility."

The third piece of work was a new version of Ionesco's classic play, Rhinoceros which Harris adapted for the EIF and the Royal Lyceum Theatre in association with DOT Theatre, Istanbul. The production was directed by the Turkish theatre director Murat Daltaban, and went on to win a host of awards at the CATS (Best Production, Best Director, Best Sound and Best Actor). It was brought back to the Lyceum as part of the 2018 season.

In 2017, she adapted Ibsen's The Master Builder for the West Yorkshire Playhouse, the resultant play was called The Fall of the Master Builder and was directed by James Brining.

Harris’ The Duchess (of Malfi), an adaptation of John Webster’s Duchess of Malfi, opened at the Royal Lyceum Theatre in 2019.

In 2020, she adapted The Hundred and One Dalmatians by Dodie Smith for a new musical, which was set to premiere in 2021 at Regent's Park Open Air Theatre. It would instead premiere on 12 July 2022. The production was directed by Timothy Sheader, choreographed by Liam Steel, set and costumes designed by Katrina Lindsay with puppetry designed and direction by Toby Olié. In 2024, it would begin a UK tour.

Harris’ original play, The Scent of Roses, had its world premiere at the Royal Lyceum Theatre in 2022, followed by a revival of Further than the Furthest Thing at the Young Vic in London the following year. Harris’ The Duchess (of Malfi) was revived at the Trafalgar Theatre for an Oct-Dec 2024 run.

=== Directing work ===
Harris has directed for a number of theatres, including the Royal Shakespeare Company, the Traverse Theatre, The Tron Theatre, 7:84 and the Royal Lyceum Theatre. In 2017 she directed Caryl Churchill's A Number for the Royal Lyceum Theatre and was awarded Best Director in the 2017 Scottish Critics CATS awards. Recent directing work includes The Duchess of Malfi, Christmas Tales, Scent of Roses for the Royal Lyceum Theatre where she is currently directing her new version of Shakespeare's Macbeth with the title Macbeth (an undoing).

She was Associate Director at the Traverse Theatre from 2015 – 2018 and the current Associate Artistic Director at the Royal Lyceum Theatre.

== Bibliography ==
=== Publications ===
- By Many Wounds, Faber and Faber (1998)
- Further than the Furthest Thing, Faber and Faber (2000)
- Nightingale and Chase, Faber and Faber (2001)
- Midwinter, Faber and Faber (2004)
- Solstice, Faber and Faber (2005)
- Julie, Faber and Faber (2006)
- Fall, Faber and Faber (2008)
- Plus Loin que Loin, Quatre Vents (2008)
- Hiver : Suivi de Crépuscule, Quatre Vents (2008)
- A Doll's House, Faber and Faber (2009)
- Women, Power and Politics, Nick Hern Books (2010)
- The Wheel, Faber and Faber (2011)
- The Bomb: A Partial History, Oberon (2012)
- How To Hold Your Breath, Faber and Faber (2015)
- This Restless House, Faber and Faber (2016)
- Meet Me at Dawn, Faber and Faber (2017)
- (the fall of) The Master Builder, Faber and Faber (2017)
- The Duchess (of Malfi), Faber and Faber (2019)
- Zinnie Harris: Plays 1, Faber and Faber (2019)
- The Scent of Roses, Faber and Faber (2022)

=== Screenplays ===
- Born with Two Mothers (Windfall Films / Channel 4), screened 2005.
- Richard is My Boyfriend (Windfall Films / Channel 4), screened 2007.
- Spooks (Kudos / BBC1), series 5, 6 and 8. 2006-2009.
- Partners in Crime, Miniseries. 2015.
- Snatches: Moments from Women's Lives, 1 episode. 2018.

== Honours and awards ==
- Best Director 2017, Critics Award for Theatre in Scotland (for A Number)
- Herald Angel 2017 for work at three plays at Edinburgh International Festival
- Best New Play 2016, Critics Award for Theatre in Scotland (for This Restless House)
- Berwin Lee Playwriting Award 2016 (for How to Hold Your Breath)
- Amnesty International Freedom of Expression Award 2011 (joint winner - for The Wheel)
- Arts Foundation Fellowship Award 2005 (for Midwinter)
- John Whiting Award 2001 (for Further than the Furthest Thing)
- Peggy Ramsay Award 2000 (for Further than the Furthest Thing)
- Five Fringe First Awards (2000, 2001, 2009, 2011, 2014)
- Nominated for UK Theatre Awards Best New Play 2016
- Nominated for Susan Smith Blackburn Prize (2005, 2012, 2016, specially commended 2000)
- Nominated for Outstanding Newcomer in British Television Writing 2016
- Nominated for Evening Standard Most Promising Playwright 2000
- Nominated for Meyer Whitworth Playwriting Award 1999
- Nominated for John Whiting Award 1999
- Nominated for Allied Domecq Playwriting Award 1999

In 2018 she was elected a Fellow of the Royal Society of Edinburgh (FRSE).
