= Andy Arnold =

British theatre director

Andy Arnold is a Scotland-based theatre director and the former artistic director of the Tron Theatre in Glasgow.

== Career ==
Arnold was the major force behind setting up The Arches, Glasgow's long running multi-arts venue, which was open from 1991 to 2015.

=== The Arches ===
The site of the venue was a previously derelict area below the Glasgow Central railway station, which was converted to house the exhibition Glasgow's Glasgow during the city's year as European City of Culture. In 1991, after the exhibition had ended, the space was obtained by Arnold for the purposes of creating a theatre. Realising that theatre productions required substantial funding, Arnold decided to stage nightclub events to support his projects, and this practice continued until the venue's closure, the clubbing revenues helping to fund what became one of Europe's leading cultural venues. Arnold set up The Arches Theatre Company to perform site specific interpretations of work by playwrights including Samuel Beckett, Tennessee Williams, David Mamet, Harold Pinter and two unperformed works by the novelist James Kelman. He was also inspired by the size and atmospherics of the space to put on unusual productions such as Arthur Miller's The Crucible in the building's damp, dark basement with the audience seated on church pews, Metropolis - The Theatre Cut, a promenade version of Fritz Lang's film featuring a cast of 100, and a staging of Seamus Heaney's translation of the epic poem Beowulf . For the building's fifteenth anniversary in 2006, Arnold conceived and directed the critically acclaimed production Spend A Penny, a series of one-on-one monologues staged in the venue's toilet cubicles, featuring work by playwrights including Liz Lochhead James Kelman and David Harrower. He received an Honorary D. Litt degree from Strathclyde University for his work at the Arches.

=== Tron Theatre ===
Arnold was appointed Artistic Director of the Tron Theatre in 2008. His first production for the Tron Theatre Company, The Drawer Boy, was highly acclaimed and since then he has also directed That Face, Cooking with Elvis, Bliss, Mud, 'Shall Roger Casement Hang?' by Peter Arnott, the world premiere stage adaptation of James Joyce's Ulysses, which toured to Ireland as well as four cities in China. In 2016 he staged a production of The Tempest in Beijing - performed in mandarin. Most recent work has included directing David Ireland's Cyprus Avenue, John Byrne's Underwood Lane, Ramesh Meyyappan in 'Off Kilter - Singapore, Glasgow, Paris, and Shanghai, The Lonesome West at the Tron and in Perm, Russia, the Scottish premiere of The Lying Kind by Anthony Neilson, a new play by Martin McCormack called Ma, Pa, and the Little Mouths, and the first British production of Ballyturk by Enda Walsh. In May 2019 he directed The Selfish Giant for Beijing Children's Theatre Company and returned to China in 2020 to direct Chinese Actors from Shanghai Dramatic Arts Centre. His tenure at Tron Theatre ended in November 2023 with the staging of Gary McNair's adaptation of Charles Dickens' Great Expectations, entitled Nae Expectations.

=== Other productions ===
Arnold directed Trafalgar Theatre's production of Death of a Salesman which toured the United Kingdom in the spring of 2025 with David Hayman in the role of Willie Loman.
