= Tron Theatre =

Theatre in Scotland

Coordinates: 55.85686°N 4.24554°W

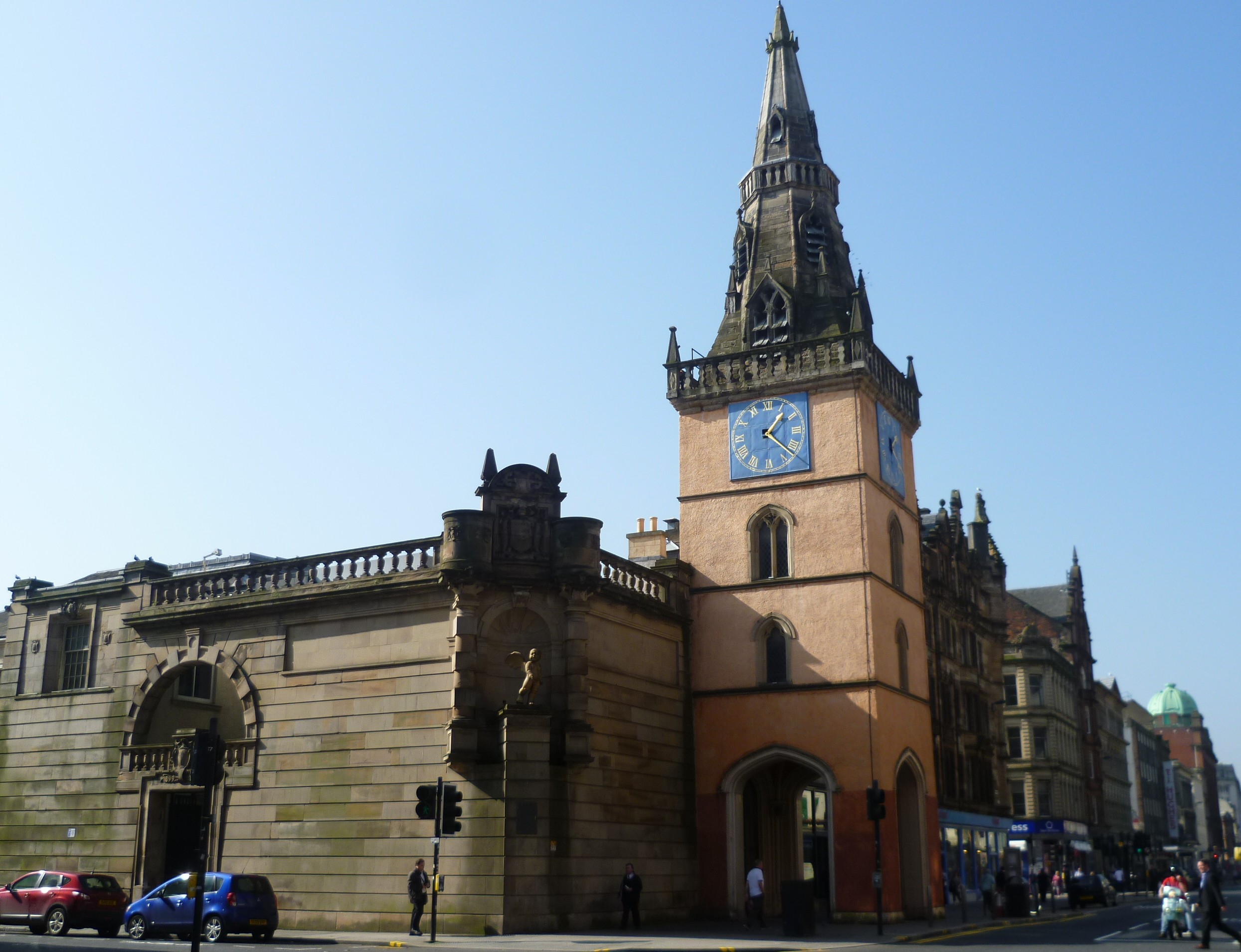
- Interactive map of Tron Theatre
- Address: 63 Trongate; Glasgow; Scotland
- Owner: Tron Theatre Ltd.
- Capacity: 230 (Main Auditorium) 50 (Changing House Studio Theatre)
- Type: End on

Construction
- Opened: 1981
- Rebuilt: 1999
- Architects: James Adam; RMJM

The Tron Theatre is located in Glasgow, Scotland. The theatre was formerly known as the Tron Kirk. It began as the Collegiate Church of Our Lady and St. Anne.

The Tron Theatre building is home to the Tron Theatre Company and serves as a producing house for contemporary theatrical work. It also acts as a receiving house for a visiting program of theatre, comedy, and music from Scotland, the UK, and abroad. Its Education and Outreach department offers a range of activities, from drama workshops for children and young people to creative writing for adults and professional development opportunities for theatre students and practitioners.

== History ==
The present day Tron Theatre Company, based in the Trongate, started life as the Glasgow Theatre Club in 1978, established by Joe Gerber, Tom Laurie, Tom McGrath and Linda Haase, at times using the Close Theatre which was part of the Citizens' Theatre in Gorbals. After the fire affecting that venue, the Club took over the almost derelict Tron Kirk, which had been built for the Church of Scotland in 1795, designed by James Adams. Adams had been the co-designer of the very new Royal Infirmary and a few years later designed the city's Assembly Rooms in Ingram Street.

The theatre opened its doors on 10 May 1981, and two days later the first season of short plays opened with a production of Eine Kleine Nacht Musik, directed by Ida Schuster-Berkeley, in the Victorian Bar.

An earlier, separate manifestation was RF Pollock's short-lived Tron Theatre Club which was active from 1929 to 1932. Pollock's vision was to develop a distinct Scottish style of acting using principles similar to those developed by Konstantin Stanislavski. One of the company's achievements was a production of Ibsen's The Master Builder. Actor Duncan Macrae began his career with Pollock's Tron Theatre Club. The amateur group dispersed in 1932, splitting into three new separate groups, including the Curtain Theatre and the Dumbarton People's Theatre.

== Artistic legacy ==
In 1984 Faynia Williams became the Tron’s first Artistic Director and, with her husband Richard Crane acting as dramaturg, wrote the first Tron Theatre Company script, Burke and Hare. Under the Artistic leadership of Michael Boyd (1986 to 1996), artists including Alan Cumming, Forbes Masson, Peter Mullan, Craig Ferguson and Siobhan Redmond, as well as musician Craig Armstrong emerged from the company.

In 2000, the Tron Theatre Company presented two world premieres of plays by Scottish writers: "Our Bad Magnet" by Douglas Maxwell and "Further than the Furthest Thing" by Zinnie Harris. "Further than the Furthest Thing," directed by Irina Brown, was a co-production between the Tron Theatre Company and the Royal National Theatre. The production premiered at the Edinburgh International Fringe Festival 2000 to universal critical acclaim, winning four major awards before a London run at the National Theatre, a subsequent transfer to the Tricycle Theatre, London and tour of South Africa.

In 2002, Neil Murray was appointed Director of the Tron, serving as Artistic Producer for the Company. Shows produced by the Tron in this period include Iain Heggie's "Love Freaks," "Possible Worlds" by John Mighton (as the centrepiece of the Canadian Six Stages Festival), Forbes Masson's "Jack and the Beanstalk" and "Cinderella" and Chris Hannan's "Shining Souls" in a co-production with v.amp productions which was awarded Best Production in the Critics Awards for Theatre In Scotland in 2003.

Previous productions include the world premiere of David Greig's "San Diego" (2004 EIF,) and Anthony Neilson's "The Wonderful World of Dissocia" in 2004, this time in a collaboration with EIF and the Theatre Royal, Plymouth. "The Wonderful World of Dissocia" subsequently went on to win 5 out of 10 awards in the 2005 Critics' Awards for Theatre in Scotland. The production was also revived in 2007 in conjunction with the National Theatre of Scotland, touring the UK including performances at the Royal Court Theatre, London.

Murray left in 2005, to take up the post of Executive Director of the National Theatre of Scotland, and between May 2005 and May 2006 the post of Director was held by Ali Curran, formerly of the Peacock Theatre at the Abbey Theatre in Dublin. The Tron produced three new works during this time: the premiere of "Ubu the King," a co-production with Dundee Repertory Theatre, the Barbican, Old Vic and Bite:05, adapted by David Greig and directed by Dominic Hill; the European premiere of John Mighton's latest work, "Half Life" co-produced with Perth Theatre and Canadian based Necessary Angel; and its annual Christmas panto, written by Forbes Masson, "Weans in the Wood." From 2006 until 2008 Gregory Thompson was Artistic Director and the Tron produced "The Patriot" by Grae Cleugh, "Antigone" and co-produced "The Wall" by D C Jackson with Borderline Theatre Company.

In April 2008 the Tron appointed a new Director Andy Arnold, previously founder of the Arches Theatre Company. Productions since 2008 have included The Drawer Boy, Monaciallo (Naples Theatre Festival, A Slow Air by David Harrower (London and New York), Sea and land and Sky - new play by Abigail Docherty, Edwin Morgan's Dreams and Other Nightmares - new play by Liz Lochhead, a new adaptation by John Byrne of Three Sisters, and the UK and Irish stage premiere of James Joyce's Ulysses adapted by Dermot Bolger and touring to Belfast, Dublin and Cork - named best production of 2012 by The List magazine.

After Andy Arnold stepped down in 2023, Jemima Levick left her role as Artistic Director of A Play, A Pie, and A Pint to replace him.

The Tron Theatre has two notable contemporary sculptures that were added to the exterior of the theatre as part of its lottery funded refurbishment in 1999. The sculptures are of a large golden cherub and of a skull. The works are by artist Kenny Hunter.

== Selected Artistic Directors ==
- Faynia Williams (1984 - 1986)
- Michael Boyd (1986 - 1996)
- Irina Brown (1996 - 1999)
- Neil Murray (2002 - 2005)
- Ali Curran (May 2005 - May 2006)
- Gregory Thompson (2006 - 2008)
- Andy Arnold (2008 - 2023)
- Jemima Levick (2023 - present)
