= Further than the Furthest Thing =

Further than the Furthest Thing is a play in two acts by the Scottish playwright Zinnie Harris, set in 1961 on a remote island based loosely on Tristan da Cunha, and in the English city of Southampton.

It was inspired by Harris' mother's memories of her childhood, during which she lived on Tristan for a few years; the Faber edition of the play includes two poems written by Harris' grandfather, Reverend Dennis Wilkinson. Since its premiere in 1999, it has been translated into multiple languages and frequently described as a "modern classic".

It was the winner of the 1999 Peggy Ramsay Award, the 2001 John Whiting Award, and the Edinburgh Fringe First Award.

== Characters ==
Mill Laverello, a housewife who becomes a leader of the community after the evacuation.

Bill Laverello, Mill's husband, and one of the few islanders to have left the island. He had left during the Second World War, and brought Christianity to the island on his return, becoming the island's minister.

Francis Swain, the nephew of Mill and Bill, who adopted him after his mother starved during the War. His return to the island after a year in Cape Town drives many of the play's events.

Mr Hansen, an English businessman who becomes involved with the island's community.

Rebecca Rodgers, whose romantic relationship with Francis is an important plot-point.

== Plot ==
=== Act 1 ===
The play opens with Bill Laverello, the island's minister, swimming in the caldera lake of the volcano which dominates the island; he leaves the water as tremors rise from the volcano. The play then moves to Mill Laverello's house, where Francis Swain, the nephew of Mill and Bill, meets Mill, having, unusually, left the island for roughly a year. After an awkward conversation, during which they are joined by Bill, who is deeply disturbed by the tremors and believes himself to have witnessed supernatural activity, Francis reveals that he has invited Mr Hansen, a factory-owner who he introduces as his friend, to the island. It becomes apparent that Mr Hansen wishes to build a factory on the island, the economy of which had, up to that point, been based entirely on subsistence farming and fishing.

Bill is strongly against the idea of a factory on the island, but promises not to publicly oppose it in an island meeting which Francis has called, in exchange for which he asks Francis to swim in the lake where he had felt the tremors. Francis is shown meeting with Rebecca Rodgers, with whom he had been in love before he left, and discovers that she has become pregnant in his absence. Mill and Mr Hansen visit the location where Mr Hansen plans to build his factory, of which Mill has become strongly supportive. Bill and Francis join them, and Francis tells them that, after swimming in the lake, he no longer wishes the factory to be built; following his opposition, it was voted down in the island meeting.

Mr Hansen leaves angrily, and Francis then informs Mill and Bill that he intends to leave on the ship with him, and return to Cape Town permanently. Mill tells Bill that she will leave with Francis if Bill cannot convince him to stay. Bill then visits Rebecca, who reveals that she had become pregnant after being raped by visiting sailors. Bill asks her to tell Francis that the baby is his, in order to convince him to stay. Rebecca agrees, on the condition that Bill will help her to kill the baby as soon as it is born.

The next scene moves forward several days, to the day of Francis and Rebecca's wedding, which has been organised off-stage. Before the wedding can take place, the volcano erupts and Rebecca goes into labour. Bill murders Rebecca's newborn baby before anyone else sees it. Mr Hansen and Mill arrive, and Mill and Bill insist on burying the baby despite Mr Hansen's objections - the island is being evacuated on the ship on which Mr Hansen had left several days prior.

=== Act 2 ===
The second act takes place eleven months later in Southampton, where the island's residents have been rehoused by the British government and given jobs in Mr Hansen's factory. Mill enters Mr Hansen's office, over the objections of Francis, who has become his secretary, and demanded that she first make an appointment. She asks when the islanders will be able to return to the island, and Mr Hansen informs her that the island had been rendered permanently uninhabitable by the volcanic eruption.

Over the next few scenes, Bill, who has been employed in the factory's boiler room, becomes increasingly obsessed with discovering the source of the water in the factory's pipes and in his own garden. Mill, meanwhile, becomes the organiser of a plan devised by the islanders to send a few men to the island to take photographs, in hope that it would give them closure; both Mr Hansen and Francis discourage the plan. Francis has become distant from the other islanders and from Rebecca, who is now actively trying to win his love.

Mr Hansen visits Bill in the boiler room, and confesses that he has lied to the community about the island, which was not in fact rendered uninhabitable. It is implied that the Ministry of Defence paid him to keep the islanders in Southampton so that the island could be used as a testing site for nuclear weapons. He reminds Bill that he knows about Bill's murder of Rebecca's child, which will prevent Bill from telling the other islanders. Mill visits Mr Hansen, and tells him that the Second World War had prevented the usual supply ships coming to the island, causing the residents to starve. In order for the maximum number to survive, they had drawn lots, and those who lost were starved to death, and their food eaten by the others. She tells Mr Hansen that she intends to sell the story to a newspaper to raise money for the photographing expedition to the island. As they speak, Bill commits suicide by drowning himself in the boiler room.

During the next scene, Bill's funeral, it is revealed that Mr Hansen had admitted to the islanders that he had lied to them about the extent of the damage, and that they intended to return to the island. Mr Hansen apologises to Mill, and promises that he will ensure the supply ships come to the island annually in future. In the last scene, the islanders, including Rebecca, leave Southampton, with the exception of Francis, who tries to persuade Rebecca to convince him to return but ultimately chooses to remain.

== Production history and reception ==
The play was first performed at the Traverse Theatre in Edinburgh on 6 August 1999, as a co-production between the Tron Theatre Company and the Royal National Theatre. It was directed by Irina Brown, and featured Paola Dionisotti as Mill, Gary McInnes as Francis, Kevin McMonagle as Bill, Darrell D'Silva as Mr Hansen, and Arlene Cockburn as Rebecca. Its premiere was extremely well-received, and in the following years the play was performed at other venues including the Royal National Theatre in London in 2001 and Manhattan Theatre Club in New York in 2002.

Reviews of the New York production were much more mixed; both Bruce Weber in The New York Times and David Finkle in TheaterMania criticised its plot as "melodramatic" and unrealistically eventful, while Charles Isherwood in Variety criticised what he viewed as its heavy-handed anti-imperialist themes.

The play had a revival at the Dundee Repertory Theatre in 2012; artistic director James Brining created an ambitious stage design using 29,000 litres of water. The water covered the stage as a shallow pool for the first act, and was collected into jars, laid around the stage, for the second. The revival was critically acclaimed, with both Brining's design and Harris' plot receiving praise, although the dialogue was criticised as over-long in places.

Further than the Furthest Thing was revived at London's Young Vic in 2023, starring Jenna Russell and Cyril Nri as Mill and Bill respectively.
