= Richard G. Fallon =

Richard G. Fallon (born September 19, 1923, New York – died May 23, 2013, Tallahassee, Florida) was Dean Emeritus of The School of Theatre at Florida State University. He came to Tallahassee in 1956 and has been active in theatre community ever since. Fallon was a Robert O. Lawton Distinguished Professor, a recipient of the Florida Governor's Award for the Arts, the Suzanne M. Davis Award for service to professional theatre, and was one of ten national recipients of the Harbison Prize for gifted teaching. He was elected to the College of Fellows of American Theatre, the National Theatre Conference, and is one of the founders of the University Resident Theatre Association.

The Florida State University School of Theatre's Richard G. Fallon Theatre was named in his honor.

Other Accomplishments include:

- A distinguished radio career
- Founded Florida State University/Asolo Conservatory for Actor Training
- Co-Founded the Southern Shakespeare Festival
