= Irina Brown =

Theatre and opera director in the United Kingdom

Irina Brown (born Leningrad, Russia) is a theatre and opera director in the United Kingdom, where she has lived and worked for over thirty years. Brown was the artistic director of the Tron Theatre in Glasgow from 1996 to 2000, and Natural Perspective Theatre Company, London from 2006 to 2011. She is noted for directing the production of Further Than the Furthest Thing by Zinnie Harris for the Royal National Theatre, The Sound of Music for the West Yorkshire Playhouse, Racine's Britannicus at Wilton's Music Hall and The Importance of Being Earnest at Open Air Theatre, Regents Park as well as Bird of Night by Dominique Le Gendre at the Royal Opera House, Covent Garden and War and Peace for the Scottish Opera/ RSAMD. Brown was the Granada Artist-in-Residence at the University of California, Davis in 2004 and 2008.

Currently she is Programme Director for the MA and MFA Contemporary Directing Practice at Rose Bruford College.

== Selected Directing Credits ==
Year	Title	Writer	Theatre	Notes
1996	A Midsummer Night's Dream	William Shakespeare		The inaugural production for the Southern Shakespeare Festival, Florida, produced by Michael J. Trout
1996	Blood Libel	Arnold Wesker	Norwich Playhouse	World Premiere
1998	Mate in Three	Vittorio Franceschi	Tron Theatre, Glasgow	Company / Tron Theatre Company; Design / Pamela McBain; Lighting / George Thomson; Performer / Fiona Bell; Performer / John Bett; Performer / Andy Gray
1998	Speedrun	Isabel Wright		World Premiere
	The Tempest Dream			Adaptation of William Shakespeare's The Tempest
	The Cosmonaut's Last Message to the Woman He Once Loved in the Former Soviet Union	David Greig		
	The Misunderstanding		Gate Theatre, Dublin	Adaptation of Camus’ absurdist play. Featured as part of the Consummate Classics Season; the production was the winner of the Time Out magazine/01- for London Award 1990
	Marina Tsvetaeva. Poet. Outcast.		Royal National Theatre, (Cottesloe Stage), London	Starred Fiona Shaw
	The Doll's House		Birmingham Rep Theatre	
	Romeo and Juliet		Contact Theatre, Manchester	
	Our Country's Good		Tabakov Theatre, Moscow	
