= Adderley Amphitheater =

Amphitheater in Tallahassee, Florida, US

Coordinates: 30°26′03″N 84°16′37″W

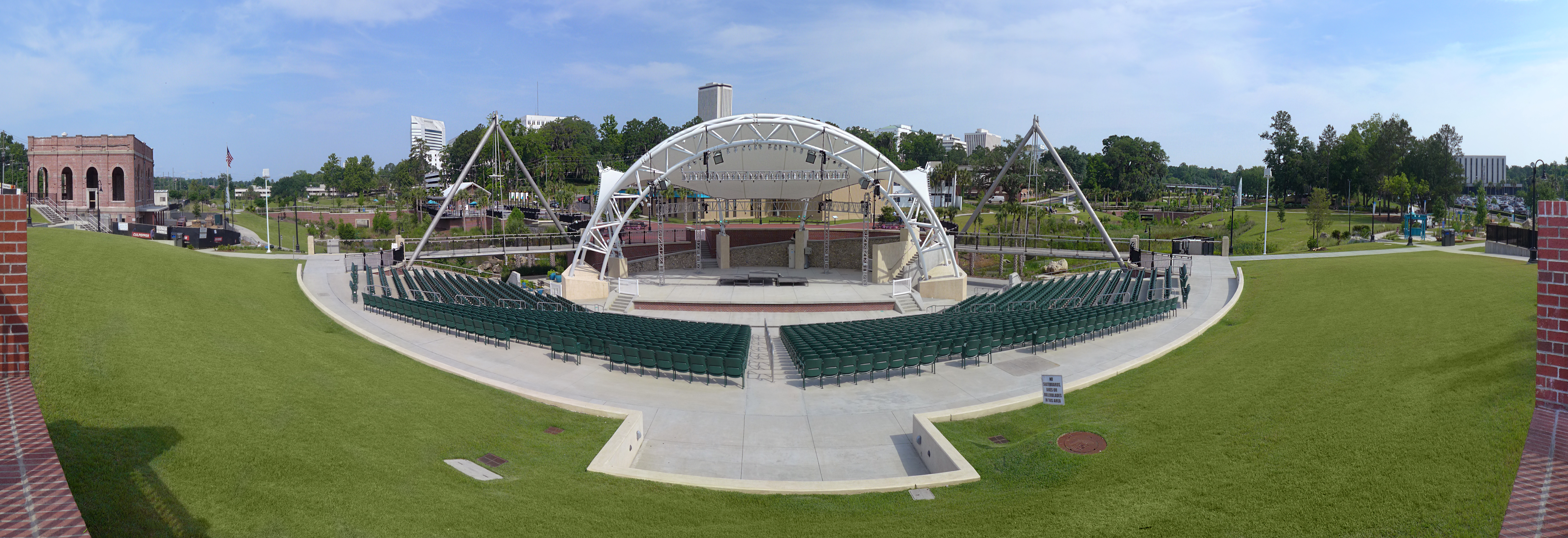
Adderley Amphitheater

The Adderley Amphitheater at Cascades Park is an outdoor performance space located in Tallahassee, Florida. In 2023, it was renamed to honor Tallahassee jazz musicians Julian and Nathaniel Adderley.

== History ==
=== Construction and design ===
The amphitheater was originally constructed under the name of the Capital City Amphitheater. The project began in 2009 as part of the broader redevelopment of Cascades Park, a joint initiative led by the City of Tallahassee and Leon County agencies. Construction was completed in 2014, and the $30-million park, featuring an outdoor performance space with seating for approximately 3,000 people, was opened to the public that year.

=== Renaming ===
Sign for the Adderley

The amphitheater was renamed on January 16, 2023, to honor Tallahassee jazz musicians Julian “Cannonball” Adderley (1928–1975) and Nathaniel “Nat” Adderley (1931–2000). The Adderley brothers grew up in a musical family with their father being a jazz cornetist and both parents being professors at Florida A&M University (FAMU). Nat played the cornet while Julian played the saxophone, and both rose to success after moving to New York City. They would later go on to play alongside musicians such as Sarah Vaughn, Miles Davis, and John Coltrane. Throughout their lives they returned to Tallahassee to play concerts at FAMU. In 2023, the city formally celebrated their contributions to jazz with a ceremony for the newly named Adderley Amphitheater.

== Events and programs ==
The Adderley Amphitheater hosts the annual Cool Breeze Art & Smooth Jazz Festival. The amphitheater also hosts the World of South Festival.
