= Monuments of Yerevan =

Yerevan is made up of a multitude of parks, gardens, statues, buildings and other monuments. This article presents some of the principal monuments of Yerevan.

== Armenian Genocide Memorial ==
There is an Armenian genocide memorial in Yerevan that is located on a hill to the west overlooking the city called Tsitsernakapert. Its construction started in 1966 after 1 million Armenians demonstrated in Yerevan on the 50th anniversary of the genocide. The construction of the monument was completed in 1968.

It is made up of a 44 meter high stela, 12 inclined slabs made of granite that are positioned in a circle, an eternal flame located in the center of the circle, a 100 meter long wall with inscriptions of the names Armenian towns and villages where massacres are known to have taken place, a museum and a park.

Every year on April 24, thousands of Armenians from Armenia and around the world commemorate the anniversary of the genocide by laying flowers around the eternal flame.

In addition, there is also another genocide memorial in Ejmiatsin, the seat of the Armenian Apostolic Church.

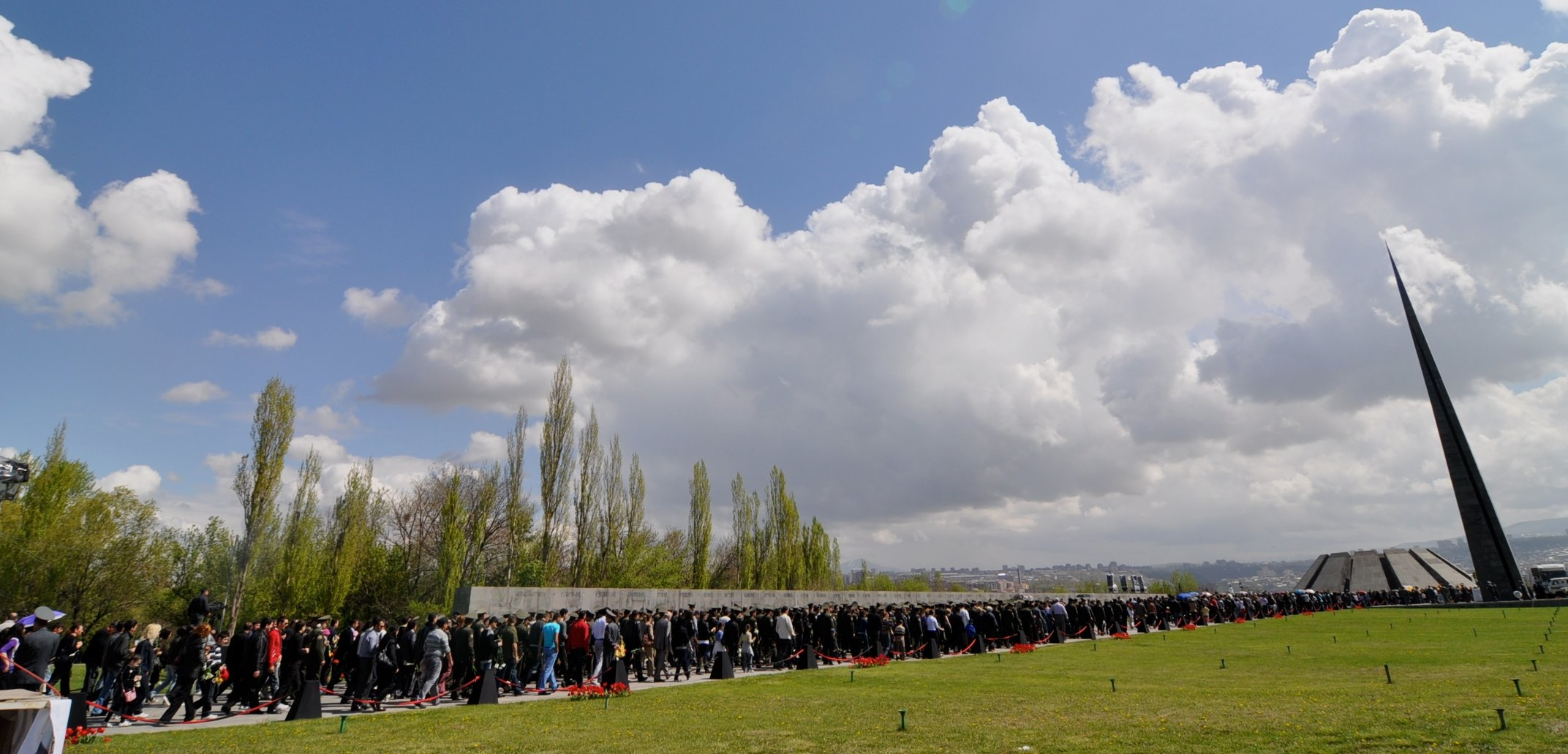
Panorama of Tsitsernakaberd

== Republic Square ==
The Republic square is the central area of the capital and is one of the principal festivity places and of gatherings. The architect Alexander Tamanian had already during his time drawn out the plans for this square but construction did not finish until the 1970s. There is a museum of history in the area.

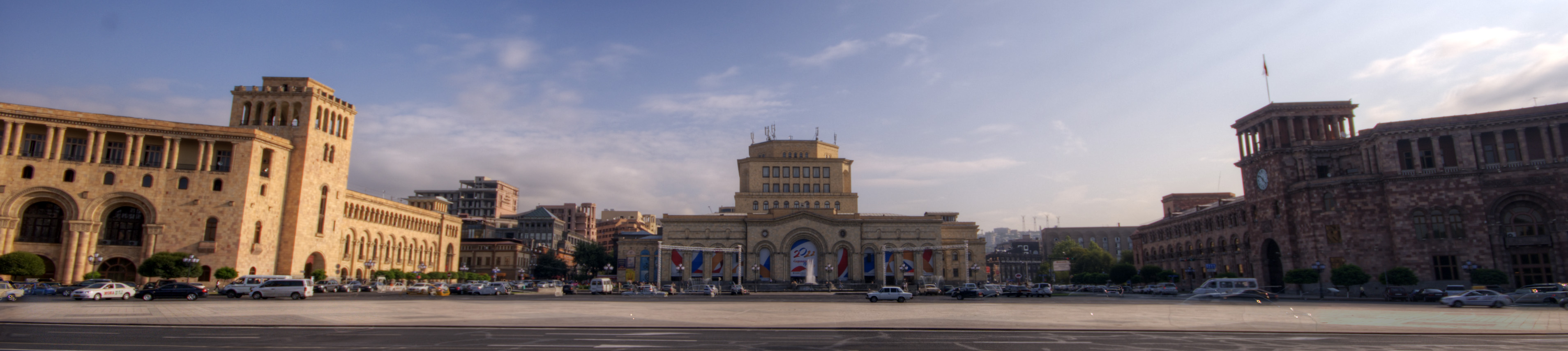
Panorama of the Republic Square

== Armenian Opera Theater ==
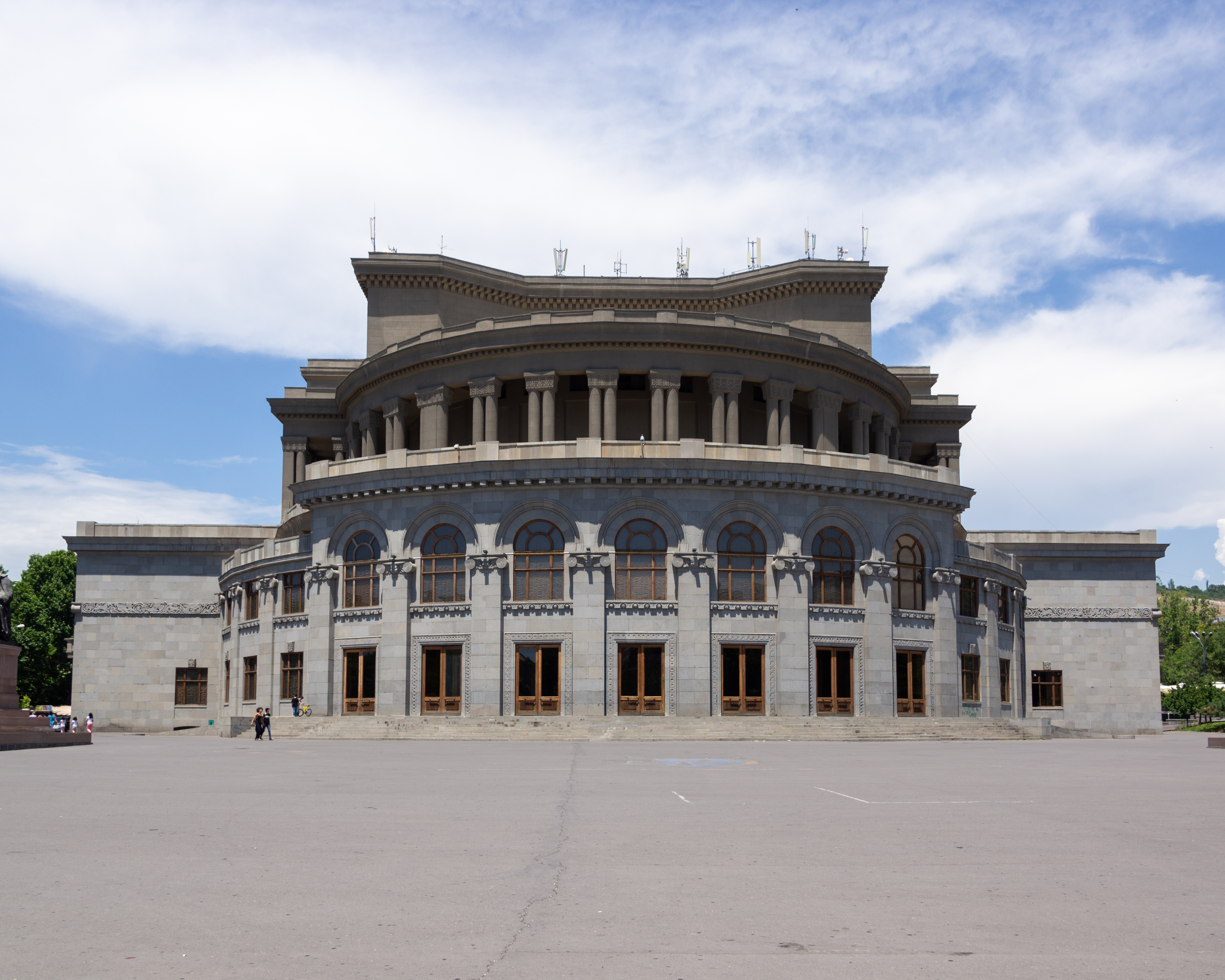
Armenian Opera Theater

The Armenian Opera Theater is the main spectacle hall of the Armenian capital. It possesses the Aram Khatchaturian concert hall, the national theatre of opera and the Alexander Spendiarian ballet.

Like most of modern-day Yerevan, this building was on the blueprints of Alexander Tamanian since the 1920s. Alongside Republic square, it is the main location of Yerevan's fesitivites.

== Cascade ==
Created in the 1970s as a simple ornamental work, the Cascades has been revived and given more attention with the fall of the Soviet Union. The privatisation of the monument has led to the emergence of several projects, notably its restoration, the construction of a contemporary art museum, several real estate projects etc. In addition, the Cascades is sometimes used like an outdoor concert hall as was the case in 2006 with the Armenian Navy Band's concert there.

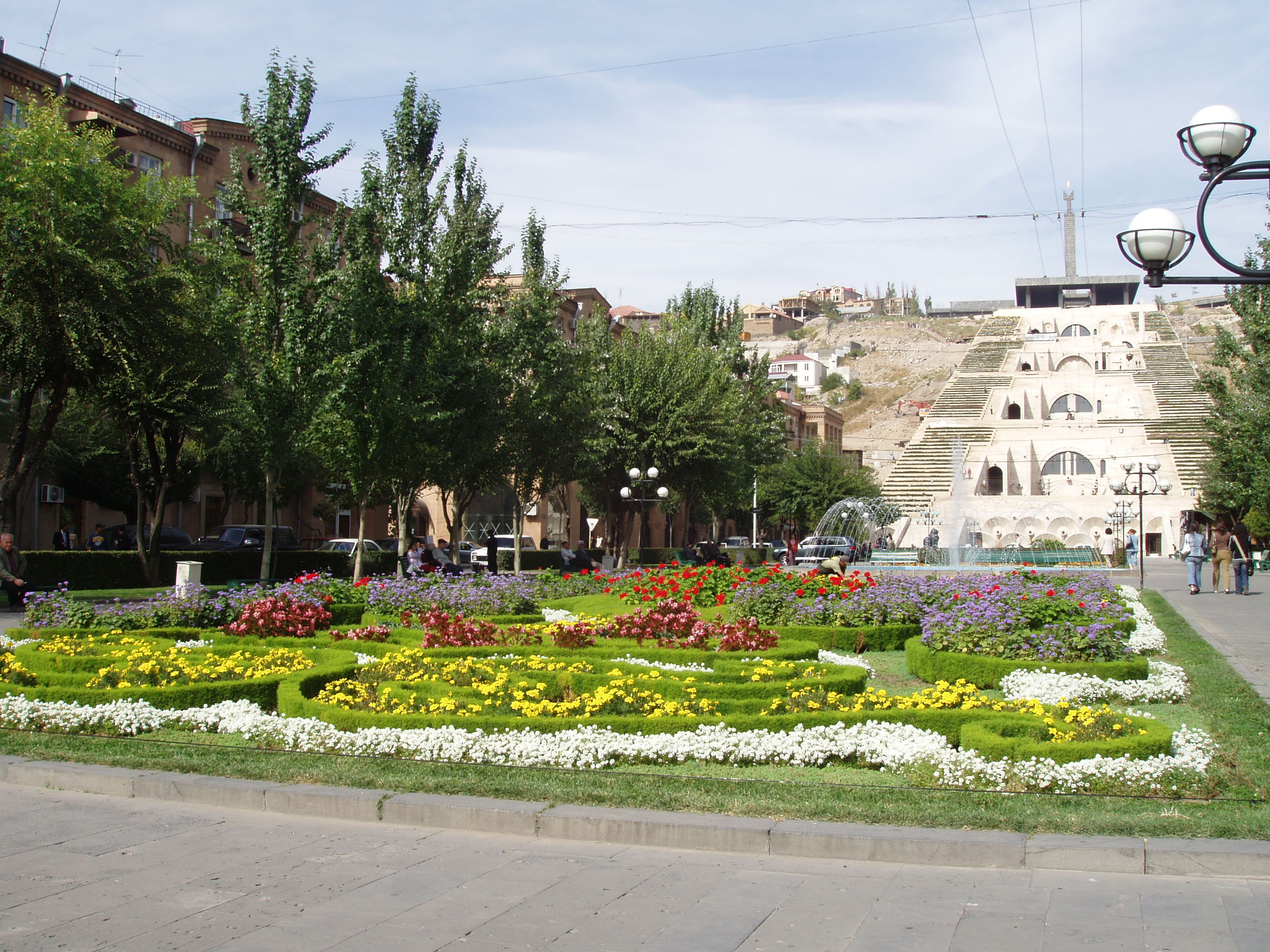
The cascade

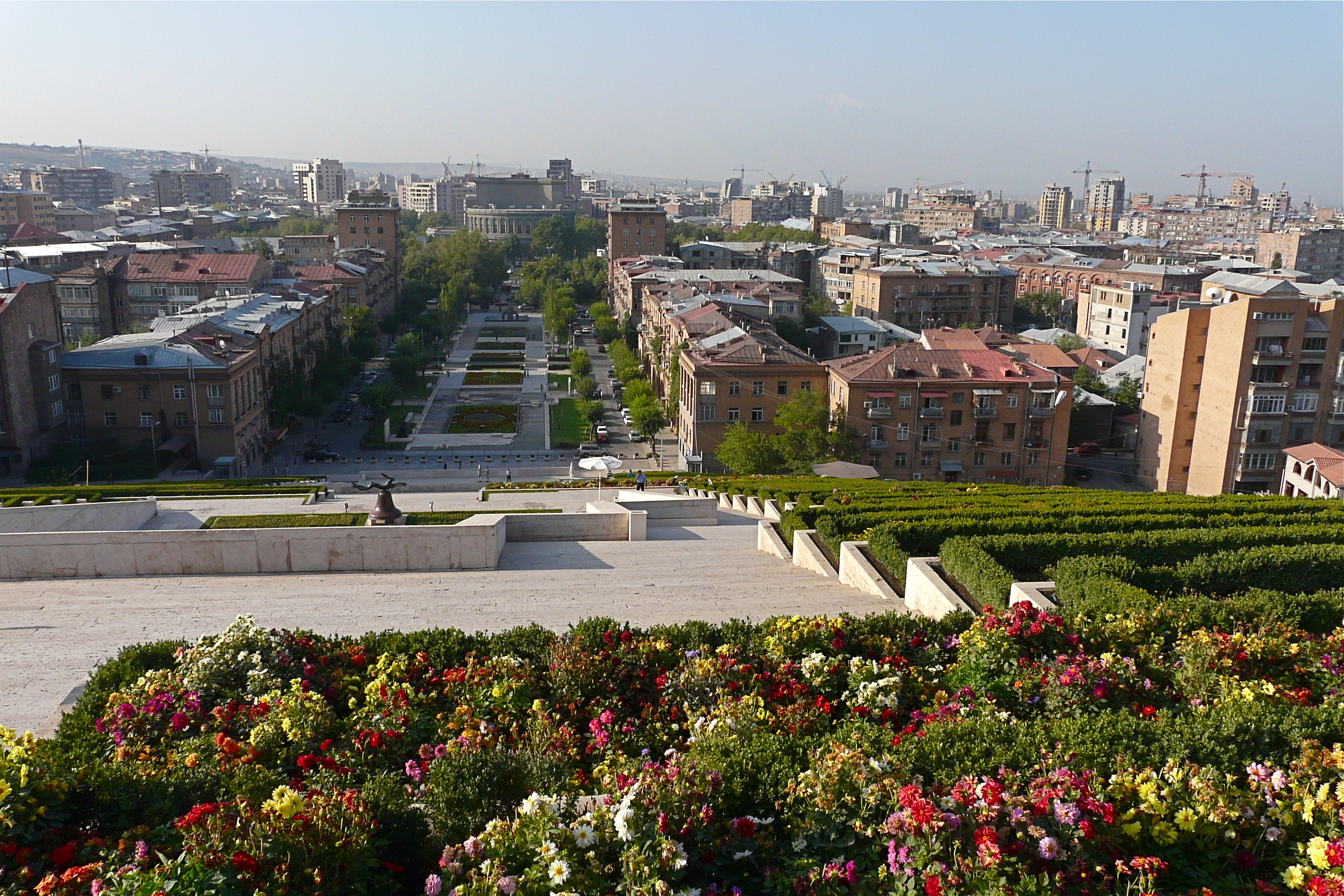
View from the top of the cascade

== Mother Armenia ==
The Mother Armenia monument is a monumental statue in Victory Park overlooking the capital city of Yerevan. Its construction started in 1950 alongside a statue of Joseph Stalin. After the death of the latter, his statue was removed and replaced in 1967 by the Mother Armenia monument.

Inside the 50-metre-tall pedestal is the Mother Armenia Museum of the Ministry of Defense. When first built, it was a military museum containing exhibits about World War II. Now a large proportion of the exhibition space is devoted to the first Nagorno-Karabakh War. The 23-meter-high statue represents a female warrior armed with a sword, overlooking the entire city.

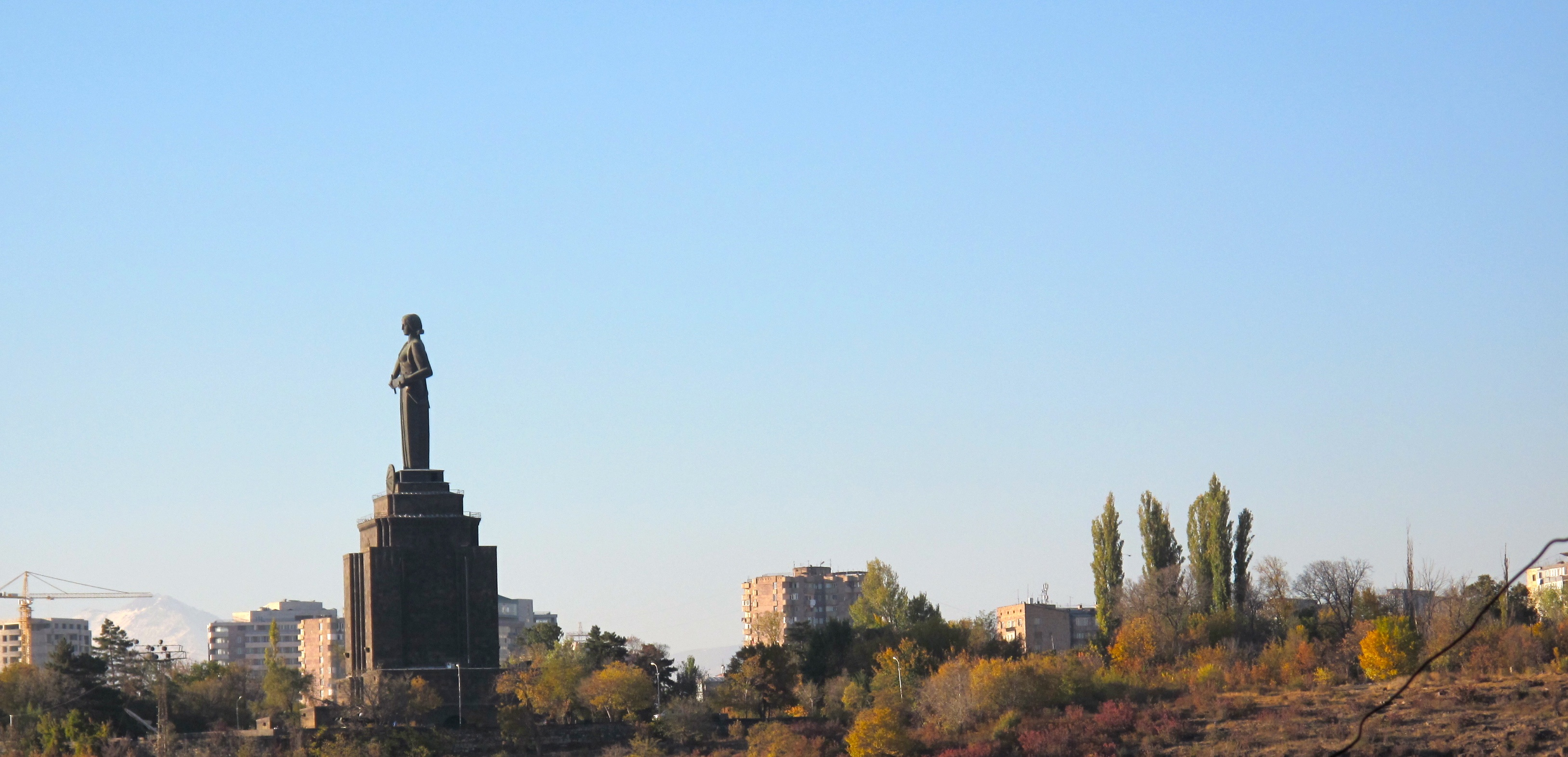
Panorama of Mother Armenia

== Matenadaran ==
The Matenadaran Mesrop Mashtots of ancient manuscripts is one of the richest libraries in books and manuscripts in the world. It has 17,000 manuscripts with some of them dating from 405, the year that Mashtots invented the Armenian alphabet.

Founded in 1959 in order to preserve and maintain ancient manuscripts, it is located in Mashtots avenue.

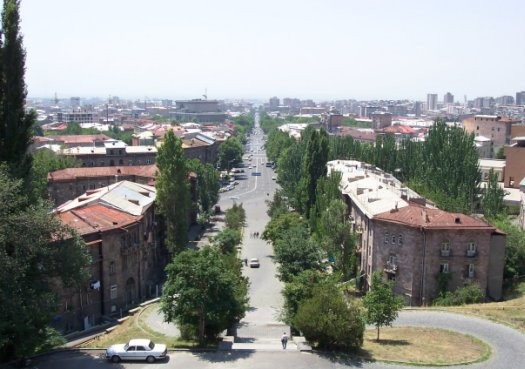
Mashdots Avenue.

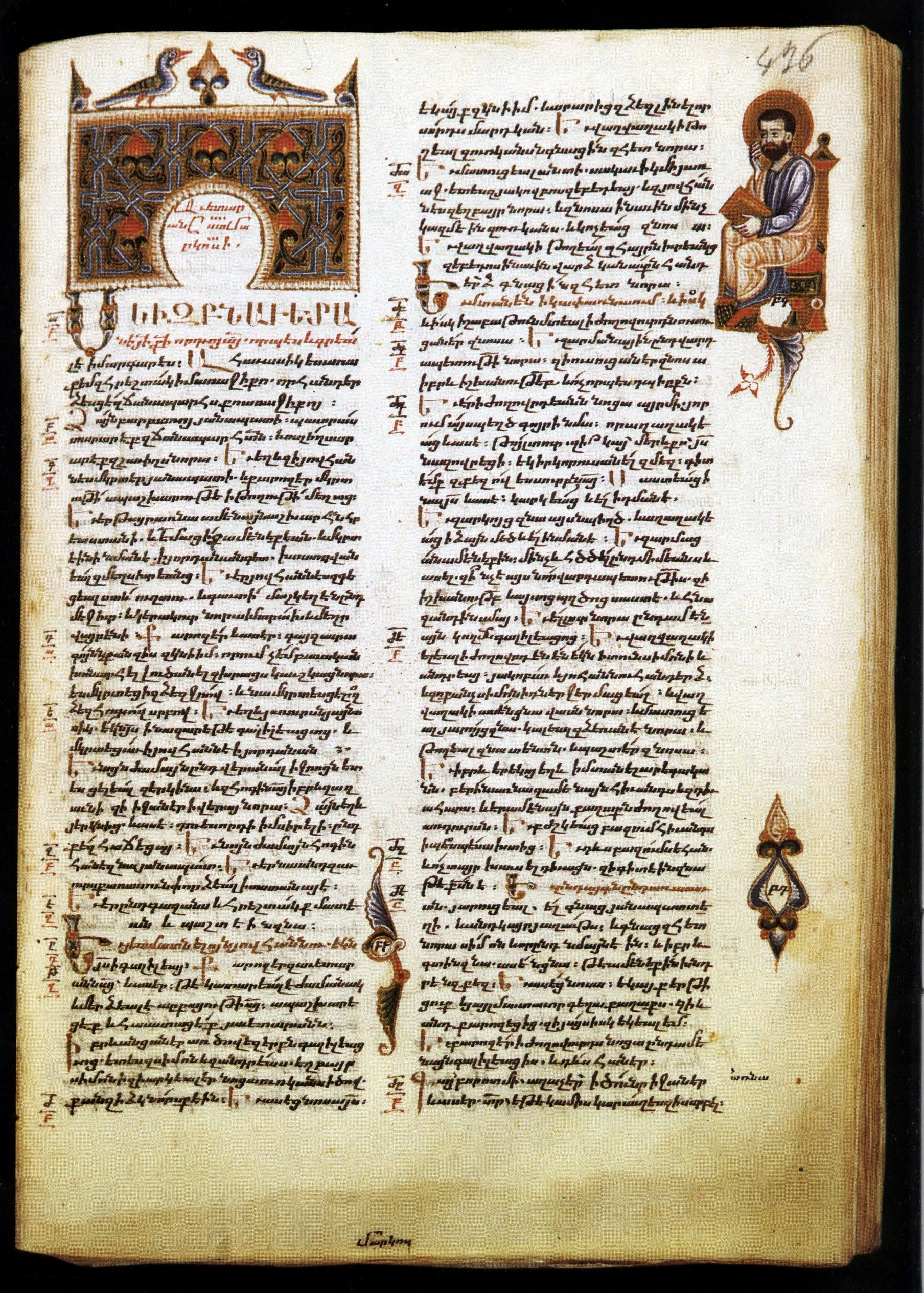
One of the manuscripts in the Matenadaran.

== Erebuni Fortress ==
This ancient fortress constructed in 8th century BC by Urartian kings Argishti I and Sarduri II, is regarded as the birthplace of Yerevan. It is located in the southeastern neighborhoods of the city.

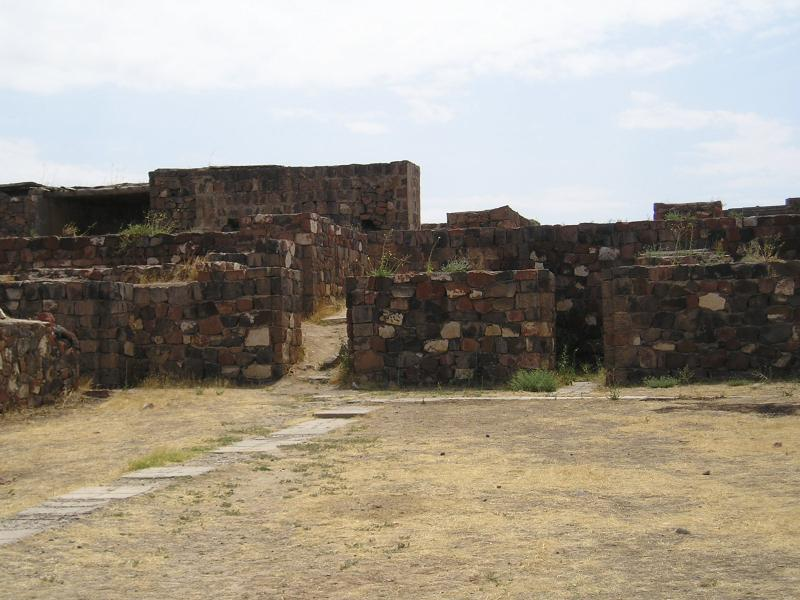
Erebuni.

== Saint Gregory Cathedral ==
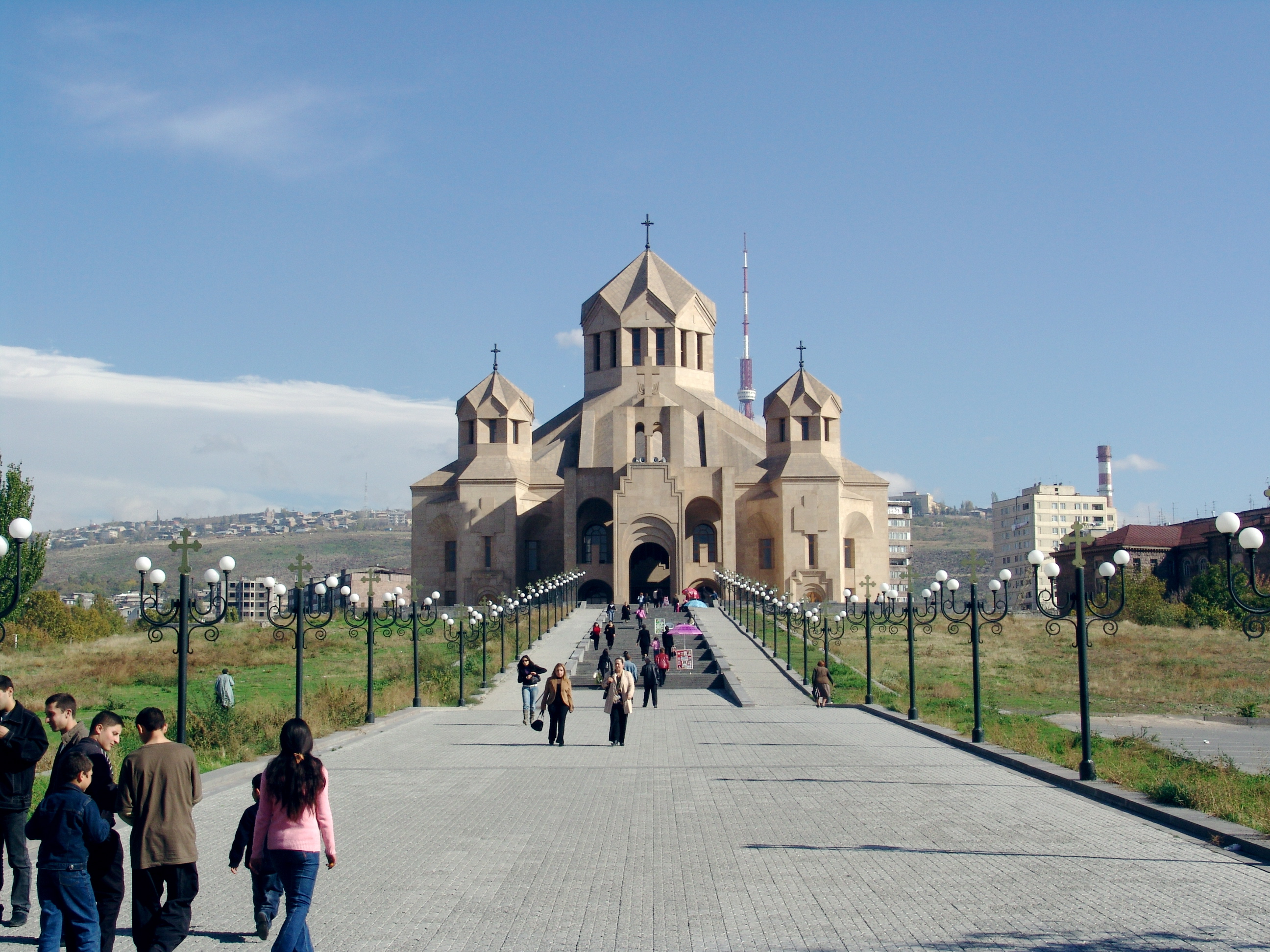
Saint Gregory Cathedral

Finished in 2001, the massive cathedral was constructed on the occasion of the 1700th anniversary of Armenia's adoption of Christianity as state religion in 301. It is sometimes also nicknamed the Anniversary church.

== Blue Mosque ==
The Blue Mosque, or Gök Jami, is the only intact mosque remaining of the eight that had once stood in Yerevan. It was built in 1766 during the reign of Hussein Ali. In 1952 it was turned into a museum about the history of Yerevan, but was restored and re-opened as a functioning mosque during the mid-1990s.

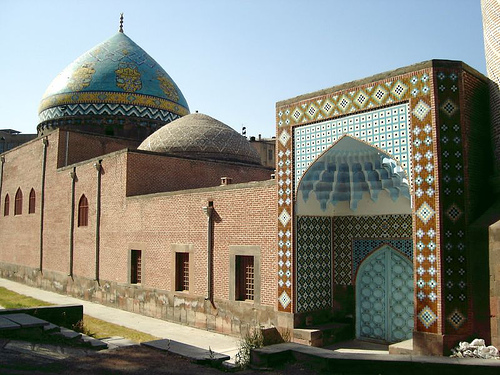
The Blue Mosque of Yerevan after its restoration.

== Karen Demirchyan Sports and Concerts Complex ==
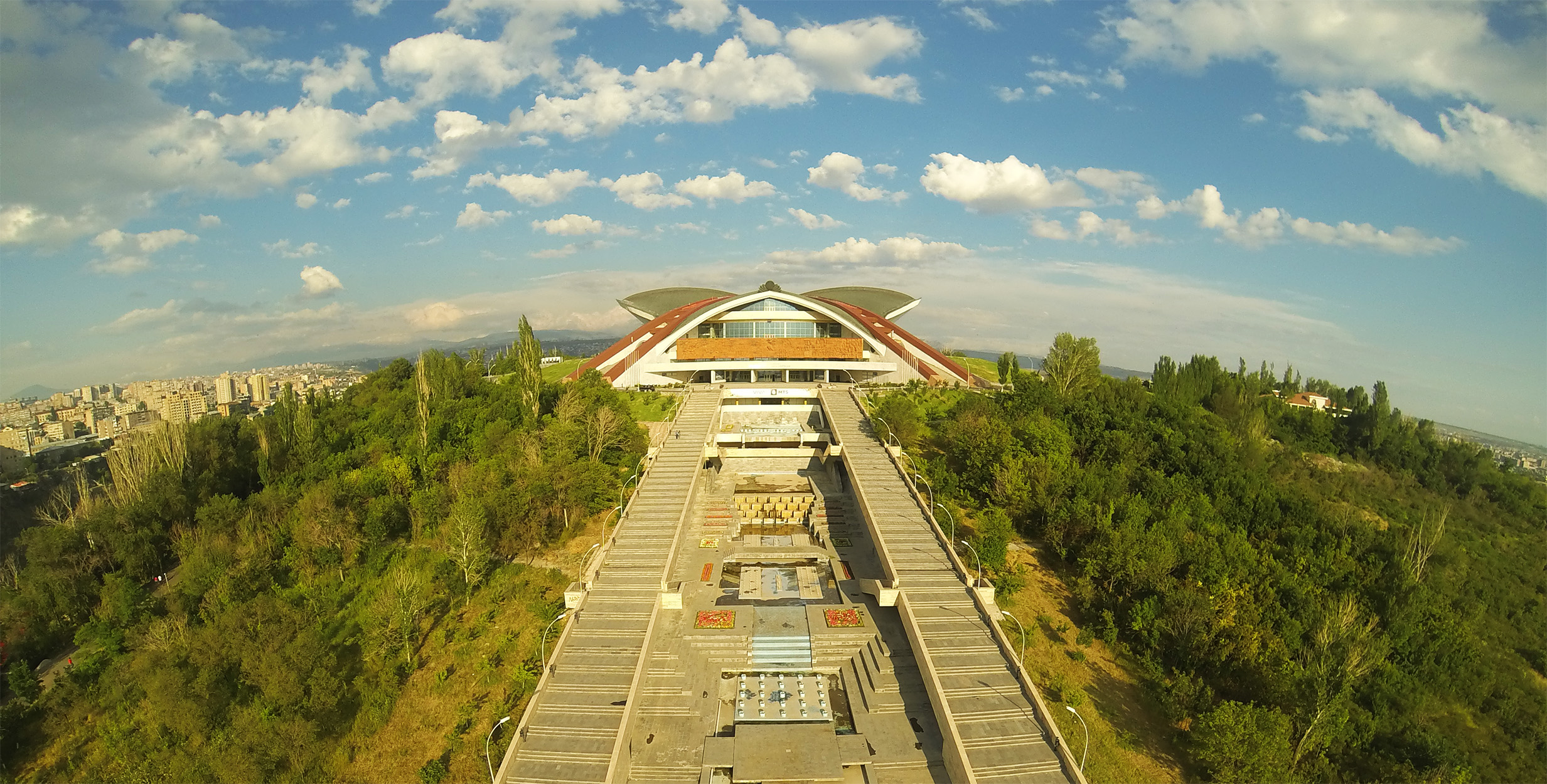
Karen Demirchyan Complex

The Karen Demirchyan Complex or the Hamalir, is a large sports and concert complex at the Tsitsernakaberd hill, which dominates over the western parts of Yerevan, near the Hrazdan River gorge. It was opened in 1983.

== Television tower ==
The television tower is a 311.7 metre high lattice tower on Nork Hill in Yerevan. It is 311.7 meters high and was built from 1974 to 1977 as a replacement for the old 180-meter high TV tower.

Currently being the highest point in the city, it is one of the highest towers in the world.

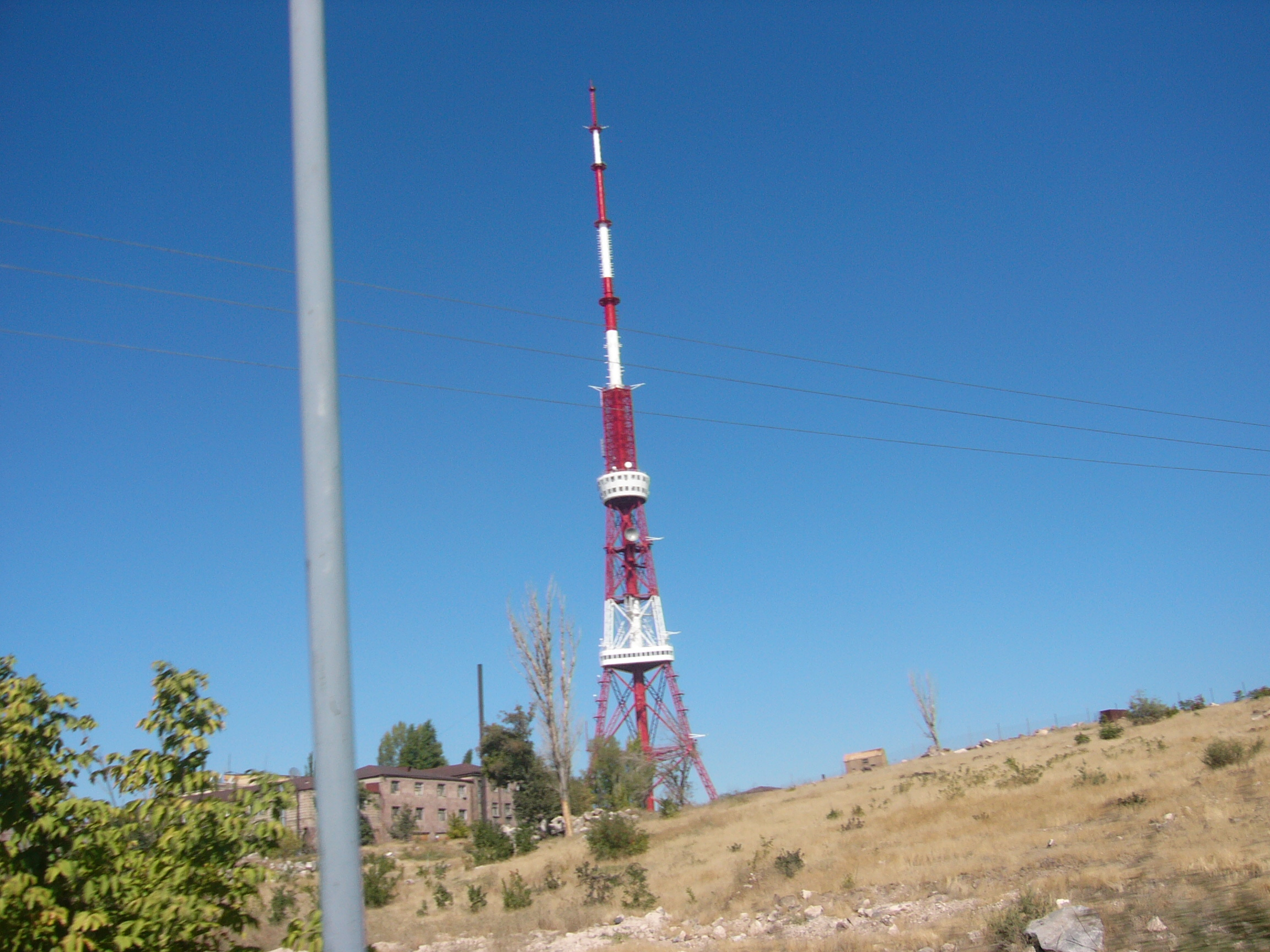
Yerevan TV Tower.

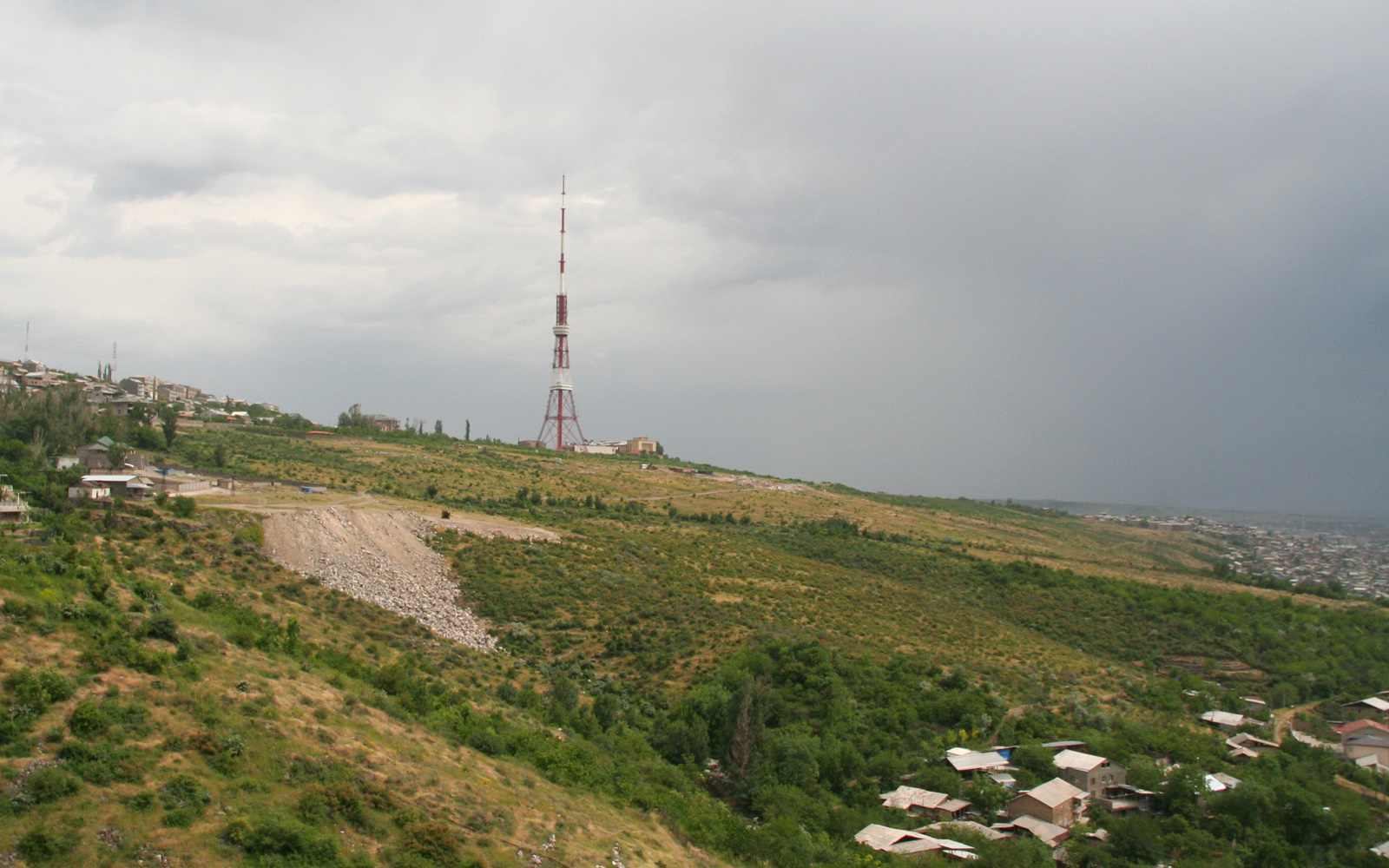
Yerevan TV Tower.

== See also ==
- Yerevan
- Monuments, movie theaters and other buildings of Yerevan
