= The Sunday Philosophy Club series =

Series of books by Alexander McCall Smith

The Sunday Philosophy Club is a series of novels and novellas by Alexander McCall Smith. It is also the name of the first novel in the series, and an informal talking group founded by the main character Isabel Dalhousie. The series is set in Edinburgh.

The title of the first book and of the series was suggested by McCall Smith's editor.

== Books ==
=== Novels ===
The series includes:

1. The Sunday Philosophy Club (2004)
2. Friends, Lovers, Chocolate (2005)
3. The Right Attitude to Rain (2006)
4. The Careful Use of Compliments (2007)
5. The Comfort of Saturdays (2008); U.S. title: The Comforts of a Muddy Saturday
6. The Lost Art of Gratitude (2009)
7. The Charming Quirks of Others (2010)
8. The Forgotten Affairs of Youth (2011)
9. The Uncommon Appeal of Clouds (2012)
10. The Novel Habits of Happiness (2015)
11. A Distant View of Everything (2017)
12. The Quiet Side of Passion (2018)
13. The Geometry of Holding Hands (2020)
14. The Sweet Remnants of Summer (2022)
15. The Conditions of Unconditional Love (2024)
16. The Subtle Pleasures of Indiscretion (2026)

=== Novellas ===
There are also three novellas, published only as ebooks:

1. The Perils of Morning Coffee (2011)
2. At the Reunion Buffet (2015)
3. Sweet, Thoughtful Valentine (2016)

== Characters ==
=== Major and recurring characters ===
- Isabel Dalhousie is in her early forties and is a philosopher, the editor of the journal "Review of Applied Ethics". Her father was a Scotsman and her mother was American, from Mobile, Alabama. Due to an inheritance left to her by her late mother, she can work for a nominal fee. She lives alone in a large ageing house in Merchiston in Edinburgh. Isabel is "a good person, a kind soul. She’s very thoughtful, obviously." However, she often lets her personal feelings about various issues get in the way of more rational judgement.
- Cat, Isabel's niece, is a young attractive woman who runs a delicatessen in the Bruntsfield neighborhood of Edinburgh. Cat has a habit of falling for inappropriate men and refusing to listen to Isabel's advice about them.
- Grace, Isabel's housekeeper, an outspoken Scotswoman with an interest in spiritualism and an opinion on everything.
- Jamie, Cat's ex-boyfriend who is a "fatally attractive" bassoonist. Becomes Isabel's husband and father to her sons. Like Isabel, Jamie is kind-hearted and enjoys helping others; however, he tends to be the more grounded, sensible, and less emotional of the two.
- Charlie, Isabel and Jamie's first-born son.
- Magnus, Isabel and Jamie's younger son.
- Eddie, Cat's assistant at the delicatessen, who has experienced "something traumatic" in his past and is therefore very shy. Over the course of the series, he begins to open up to others.
- Brother Fox, an urban fox who lives in Isabel's garden.
- Peter and Susie Stevenson, two close friends of Isabel's.
- Robert Lettuce, an English philosopher who tried to have Isabel fired from the editorial position of the Review of Applied Ethics. As such, Isabel dislikes him greatly.

=== Minor characters ===
- Mark, a man whose death at the theatre Isabel decides to investigate (The Sunday Philosophy Club)
- Toby, Cat's first unsuitable boyfriend, with a penchant for crushed-strawberry-coloured trousers (SPC)
- Ian, the recipient of a problematic heart transplant (Friends, Lovers, Chocolate)
- Tomasso, an Italian who woos Isabel (FLC)
- Rose Macleod and Graeme, a couple whose son has died (FLC)
- Mimi, Isabel's cousin from Dallas, and her husband Joe (The Right Attitude to Rain)
- Tom Bruce, a rich American who suffers from Bell's palsy, and his young beautiful fiancée Angie (RATR)
- Patrick, another of Cat's boyfriends, who is under his mother's thumb (RATR)

== Setting ==
The Sunday Philosophy Club marked a departure from the gentle Botswana setting of McCall Smith's previous series: in an interview in May 2004, McCall Smith said, "I’m enjoying it immensely, writing about a different milieu." The series was set in Edinburgh because McCall Smith "wanted to write something about Scotland" and finds Edinburgh "a very interesting and intriguing city." The series tries to reflect the Edinburgh people, who are "vivid agreeable people just waiting to have a novel written about them." McCall Smith has lived in Edinburgh since 1984.

Particular comparisons have been made between McCall's Edinburgh and the version of the city that appears in Ian Rankin’s books. McCall Smith notes that his books are "certainly a bit different from the very realistic fiction that comes from Edinburgh" but believes that both styles equally reflect the nature of Edinburgh and Scotland: "I would say that a city’s literary nature needn’t be carved in stone. One doesn’t need to accept that there is just one sort of literature or one formula for the Scottish novel."

== Style ==
In comparison to The No 1 Ladies’ Detective Agency, the Sunday Philosophy Club series is "a little bit more tilted in the mystery direction." Nonetheless, it is a detective novel "only in a rather quirky, incidental way." More importantly, the series is character- rather than plot-driven.

Time Out’s website describes the main character Isabel thus: "If you combine the nosey interfering of Austen’s Emma with the relentless self-analysis of Carrie Bradshaw you have a fair idea of the protagonist." The books are mostly narrated through Isabel's eyes from a limited third-person viewpoint.

McCall Smith himself calls the series "a little more focused" than The No 1 Ladies’ Detective Agency, with "a different register." Nonetheless, he believes that Precious Ramotswe and Isabel would get along: "[Mma Ramotswe] would respect [Isabel] but she would probably tell her to relax a bit, drink a bit more tea, and sit out under a tree to chew the fat a bit more." The repeated presence of a female protagonist who tries to do the right thing demonstrates McCall Smith's "underlying sympathy for women and fundamental generosity of spirit."

== Themes and issues ==
The series deals widely with "everyday moral and philosophical conundrums" through Isabel's work as the editor of a philosophical journal. McCall Smith notes: "We can't necessarily answer the great questions about meaning – Camus talks about this, that you can't answer the question of what is the meaning of life, but you can find meaning in a limited context, and work toward that."

A key element is the notion that simplicity and kindness are important aspects of life: "Kindness needn't be dull ... it can also be elevating and moving." Commenting on the lack of villains in his ‘mystery’ stories, McCall Smith explains: "I don't do baddies very well." Ultimately, the books examine "the fundamental question of how we can lead a good and satisfying life."

The series frequently makes references to works of literature from Scotland and elsewhere. Often-mentioned is W. H. Auden, McCall Smith's favourite poet, whose "marvellously humane" poetry is "a constant inspiration".

Jamie, Isabel's love interest, has been given McCall Smith's favourite name.

The Really Terrible Orchestra, of which the author is a founding member, appears in the first novel of this series.

Philosopher Julian Baggini also appears in two novels in the series.
