= Brooke-Hitching =

Brooke-Hitching is a surname. Notable people with the surname include:

- Thomas Brooke-Hitching (1858–1926), British businessman and politician
- Edward Brooke-Hitching (fl. 2019), British writer and map-collector
