= Auditorium =

Room built to enable an audience to hear and watch performances

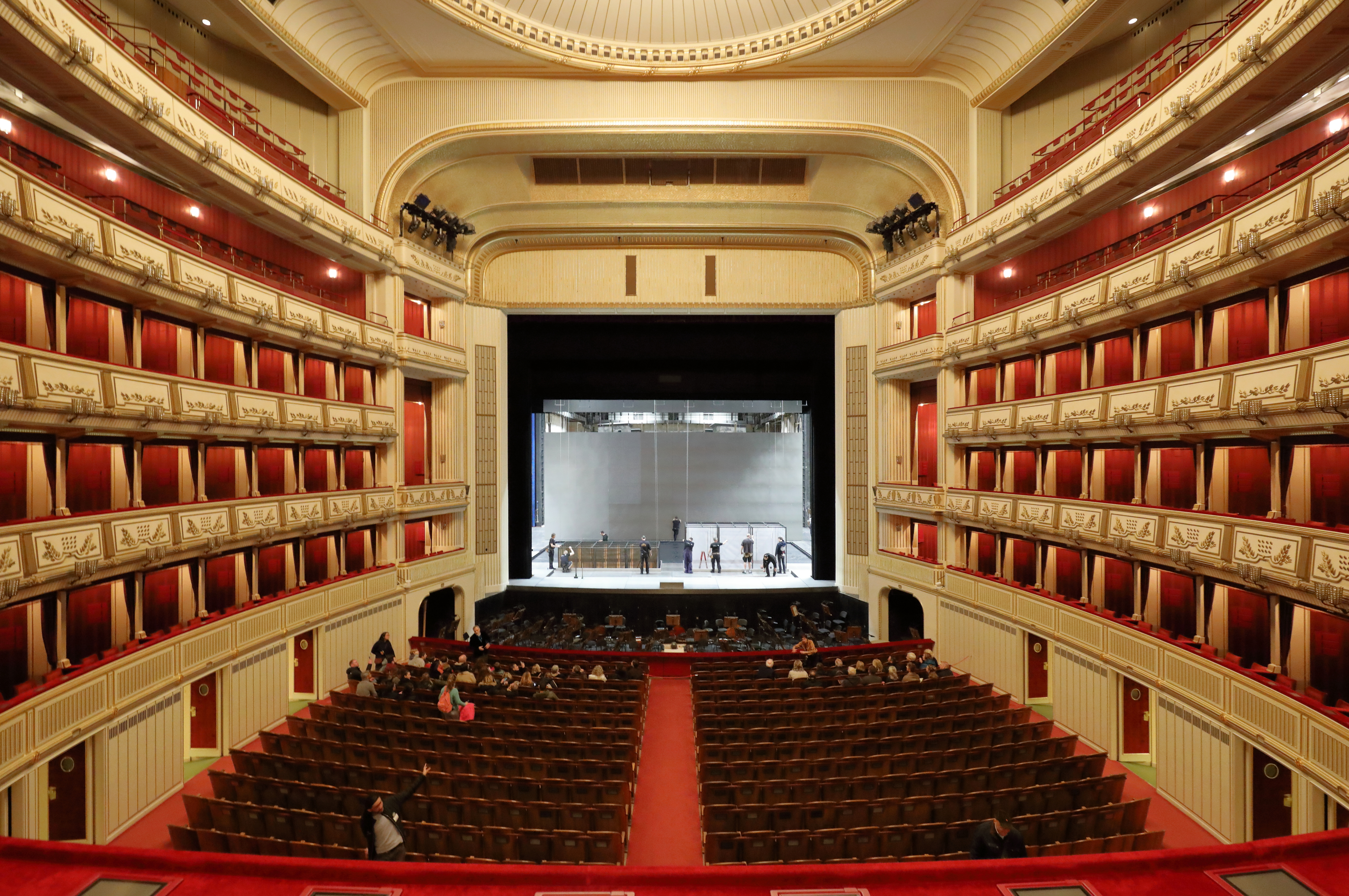
The auditorium of the Vienna State Opera

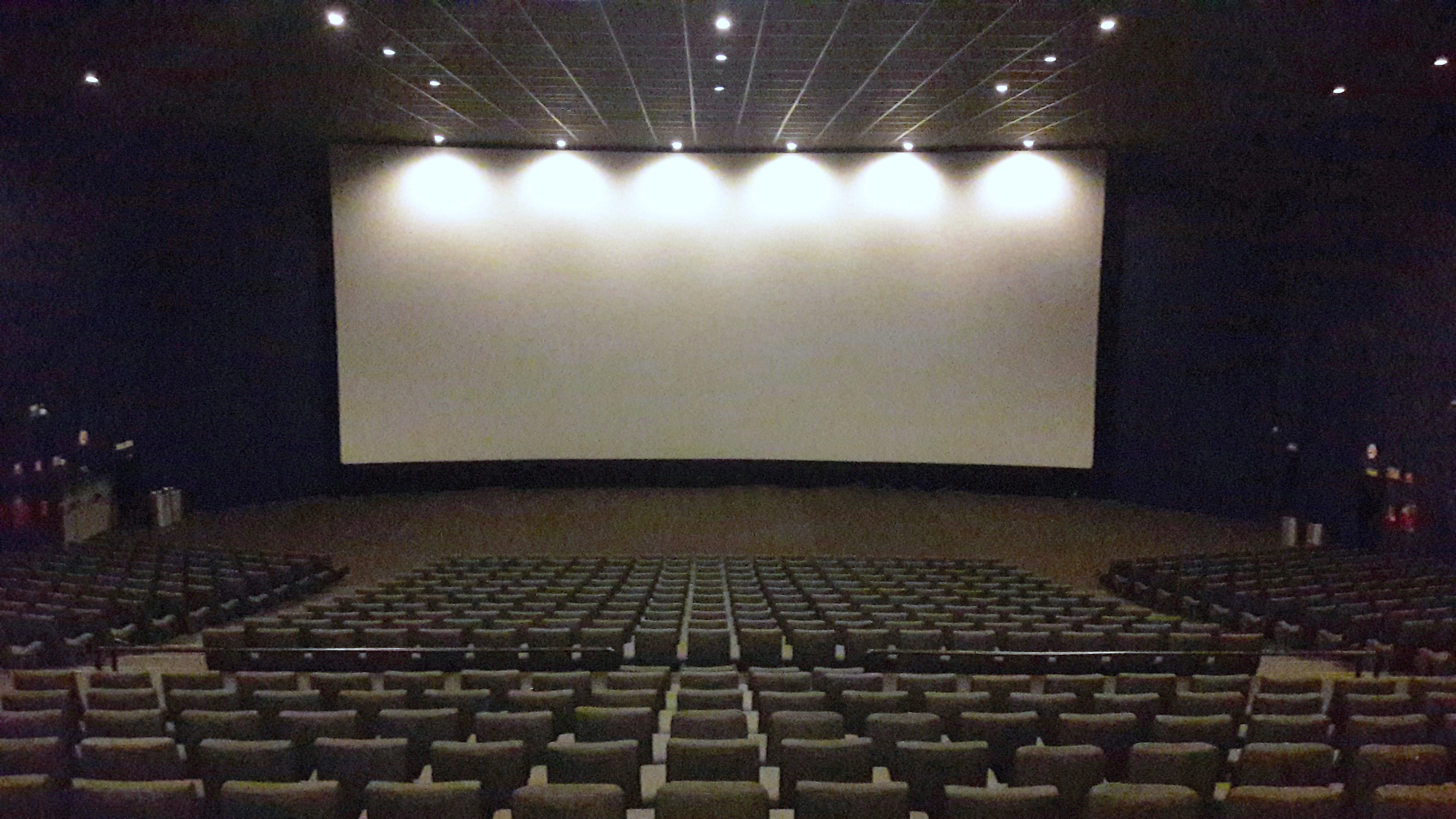
A typical movie theater auditorium

An auditorium is a room built to enable an audience to hear and watch performances. For movie theaters, the number of auditoriums is expressed as the number of screens. Auditoriums can be found in entertainment venues, community halls, and theaters, and may be used for rehearsal, presentation, performing arts productions, public speeches or as a learning space.

== Etymology ==
The term is taken from Latin (from audītōrium, from audītōrius ("pertaining to hearing")); the concept is taken from the Greek auditorium, which had a series of semi-circular seating shelves in the theatre, divided by broad 'belts', called diazomata, with eleven rows of seats between each.

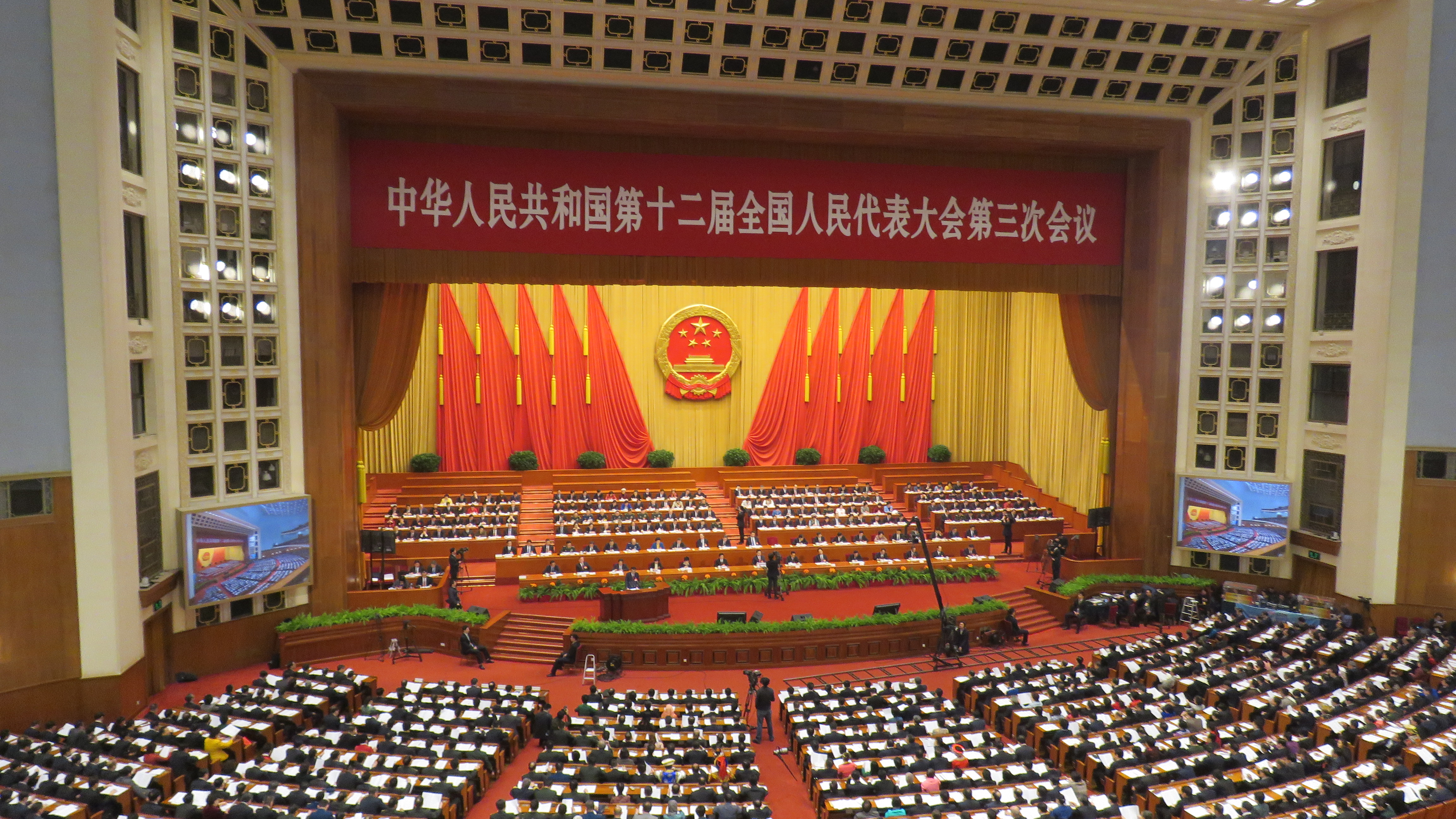
The grand auditorium of the Great Hall of the People in Beijing, China

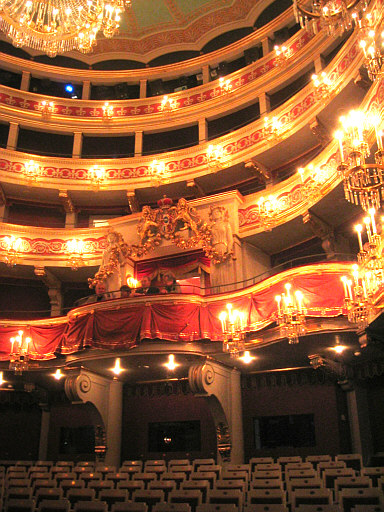
The auditorium of the Municipal Theatre of Regensburg, Germany

== Auditorium structure ==
The audience in a modern theatre are usually separated from the performers by the proscenium arch, although other types of stage are common.

The price charged for seats in each part of the auditorium (known in the industry as the house) usually varies according to the quality of the view of the stage. The seating areas can include some or all of the following:

- Stalls, orchestra or arena: the lower flat area, usually below or at the same level as the stage.
- Balconies or galleries: one or more raised seating platforms towards the rear of the auditorium. In larger theatres, multiple levels are stacked vertically above or behind the stalls. The first level is usually called the dress circle or grand circle. The highest platform, or upper circle is sometimes known as "the gods", especially in large opera houses, where the seats can be very high and a long distance from the stage.
- Boxes: generally placed immediately to the front, side and above the level of the stage. They are often separate rooms with an open viewing area which generally seat only a handful of people. These seats are generally considered the most prestigious of the house. A state box or royal box is sometimes provided for dignitaries.
- Seating arrangement: Seating arrangements in an auditorium seating layout (or assembly space) will either be identified as "multiple-aisle" or "continental". These terms are commonly found in design standards manuals, building codes, and similar architectural reference documents. Each size is unique, with specific guidelines governing row size, row spacing, and exit ways. Basically, a multiple-aisle arrangement will have a maximum of 14–16 chairs per row with access to an aisle-way at both ends. In a continental arrangement, all seats are located in a central section. Here the maximum quantity of chairs per row can greatly exceed the limits established in a multiple-aisle arrangement. In order to compensate for the greater length of rows allowed, building codes will require wider row spacing, wider aisles, and strategically located exit doors. Although it would seem like more space is called for, a continental seating plan is often not any less efficient than a multiple-aisle arrangement. In fact, if it is carefully planned, a continental arrangement can frequently accommodate more seating within the same space.

== Similar structures at other venues ==
Sports venues such as stadiums and racetracks also have royal boxes or enclosures, for example at the All England Club and Ascot Racecourse, where access is limited to royal families or other distinguished personalities. In other countries, sports venues have luxury boxes, where access is open to anyone who can afford tickets. Additionally, some sports venues were themselves called auditoriums, such as the former Buffalo Memorial Auditorium.

== See also ==
- Auditorium Building (Chicago)
- List of concert halls
- Architectural acoustics
- Music venue
- Noise control
- Performing arts center
