= The Right Attitude to Rain =

2006 novel by Alexander McCall Smith

- First UK edition
- Author: Alexander McCall Smith
- Language: English
- Series: The Sunday Philosophy Club Series
- Subject: Isabel Dalhousie
- Genre: Fiction
- Publisher: Pantheon Books (US); Little, Brown (UK)
- Publication date: 19 September 2006
- Publication place: United Kingdom
- Media type: Hardback
- Pages: 288
- ISBN: 0-375-42300-1
- Preceded by: Friends, Lovers, Chocolate
- Followed by: The Careful Use of Compliments

The Right Attitude to Rain is the third of the Sunday Philosophy Club series of novels by Alexander McCall Smith, set in Edinburgh, Scotland, and featuring the protagonist Isabel Dalhousie. It was first published in 2006, and is the sequel to Friends, Lovers, Chocolate.

== Plot synopsis ==
Isabel Dalhousie is in her early forties and lives alone in a large ageing house in the south of Edinburgh. Due to an inheritance left to her by her late mother, she can work for a nominal fee as the editor of the Review of Applied Ethics. Her closest friends are her niece Cat, a young woman who runs a delicatessen; her housekeeper Grace, an outspoken woman with an interest in spiritualism; Cat's ex-boyfriend Jamie, a bassoonist to whom Isabel has been secretly attracted ever since they met; and Brother Fox, an urban fox who lives in Isabel's garden.

When visiting an art gallery, Isabel meets an American couple: Isabel sees that the man has Bell's palsy, and takes an instant dislike to the woman for no reason that she can explain. Then she goes to Cat's delicatessen, where Cat's assistant Eddie tells her that Cat has a new boyfriend, Patrick, a workaholic lawyer. Isabel resolves not to judge him without meeting him.

Isabel visits a flat that she is considering buying for Grace, who currently rents; Jamie accompanies her. Later, Isabel's agent calls to tell her that she has been offered the flat because the owner, Florence, has assumed that Isabel and Jamie will live in it together as a couple. Isabel calls back to correct the mistake, but when Florence hears that Isabel is buying the flat for Grace, she offers it to her anyway.

Isabel's cousins Mimi and Joe visit from Dallas. Mimi tells Isabel that some friends from Texas – Tom Bruce and his fiancée Angie – own a house in Peebles, and that Mimi, Joe and Isabel have been invited to spend the weekend with them. When Mimi says that Tom suffers from Bell's palsy, Isabel realises that he is the man she saw in the art gallery, and Mimi confirms Isabel's negative impressions of Angie: most of Tom's friends think that Angie is marrying him for his money.

Isabel goes to visit Jamie at his flat. As she is examining one of his bassoon reeds, he kisses her, but pulls away after a few moments and says that it was a stupid mistake. The next day, Mimi reveals that Isabel's mother had an affair with a younger man, and Isabel is shocked.

When Mimi suggests that Isabel invite Tom and Angie to dinner before the weekend away, Isabel also invites Jamie. Isabel likes Tom instantly, but still dislikes Angie, especially when Angie flirts with Jamie and invites him to form part of the weekend party. Isabel wonders if perhaps Jamie is more suited to a younger woman like Angie, but is surprised (and reassured) when Grace announces that it is obvious that Isabel and Jamie are in love with each other. Mimi agrees that this is how it seems.

A few days later, Isabel meets Patrick's mother, Cynthia, who tries to enlist Isabel's help in breaking up Cat and Patrick so that Patrick can focus on his career. Isabel refuses, but suspects that Patrick will choose his mother over Cat; and he does.

At Tom and Angie's house, Isabel and Jamie discover that they have been given adjoining rooms. Again Angie flirts with Jamie and Isabel is sure that she does not love Tom. That evening, Isabel summons up the courage to ask Jamie if he wants to sleep with her. He admits that he does, and they return to their rooms and make love.

When Isabel and Jamie return from Peebles, Cat finds out that they have slept together and is furious with Isabel. As Isabel sits at home feeling guilty, Tom comes to visit and says that he doesn't think Angie loves him. Isabel tells him to end the engagement, and, if Angie refuses to give up the chance at Tom's fortune, to pay her off now. Later, Mimi announces that Tom and Angie have split up, but says that Angie refused to take any money. However, after Mimi and Joe return to Texas, someone sets fire to Tom's Dallas house (although Tom is unharmed).

Cat writes to apologise to Isabel for being angry with her, and Isabel feels that with time Cat will accept the idea of her and Jamie. This comes as a particular relief to Isabel, who that evening tells Jamie that she is pregnant with his child.

== Development ==
The Right Attitude to Rain presents the culmination of a relationship that had been suggested since the first appearance of Isabel and Jamie in The Sunday Philosophy Club. McCall Smith admits that there has always been "tension" and "affection" between the two characters but was originally unsure of whether to develop their friendship into a sexual relationship: "I think that’s something one would have to handle very carefully because ... Isabel has a very real sense of what can be and what can’t be. Some people have said to me, ‘Oh, why don’t you make that develop,’ but I'm not sure whether in real life it would develop." McCall Smith also found that the unfulfilled nature of the relationship was good for the novel, commenting that "Erotic tension is much sexier than fulfilment" and that reading about other people not getting what they want is interesting because "It's the story of all our lives."

The decision to change the direction of Isabel and Jamie’s relationship was partly due to pressure from fans.

== Reception ==
The Right Attitude to Rain generally received more positive reviews than its predecessors. EW.com is pleased by the development of Isabel's relationship, commenting "Hurray! An Alexander McCall Smith heroine finally gets some" and adding that "This affair is a welcome break from the tea sipping and moral hair-splitting that have made McCall Smith's recent novels such effective sleep aids." BookReporter.com agrees that this is the most interesting aspect of the novel, saying, "For the first time Alexander McCall Smith fleshes out this eccentric and delightful woman". They also commend the philosophical material: "Isabel's quandaries delight and pique the inner philosopher in all of us."

InTheNews.com disagrees, saying that "the interjections of philosophical and high-brow intellectual reasoning ... can seem snobbish and isolating to the average reader, ie those without a PhD." However, it says that the novel is "packed full of quirky characters, feel-good moments and beautiful settings" and summarises it as: "Thoughtful. Gently-paced. Intelligent. Philosophical."

Time Out London's website is critical of the unfolding of the plot, finding it "a little too neat and Miss Marple-y", while the ending is "far too trite" with "the curious moral message that the best way to overcome difficulties is to get pregnant."

== Influences and references ==
John Wilson of the journal First Things suggests that parts of The Right Attitude to Rain, particularly the surprise ending, are reminiscent of the writing of Iris Murdoch, in that they are "sudden twists of plot and character" that underline "how often we are wrong about each other and wrong more generally in our suppositions, our inferences."

== Editions ==
The UK audio version of the book is abridged, and is read by Hilary Neville. The US version is unabridged and is read by Davina Porter.
