= RTO =

RTO may refer to:

== Organizations ==
- The Really Terrible Orchestra, a British amateur orchestra
- Regional Transport Office, an Indian government bureau
- Regional transmission organization, in electric utility distribution
- Registered training organisation, an organisation that provides vocational education and training in Australia
- NATO Research and Technology Organisation, a division of the North Atlantic Treaty Organisation (NATO)
- Russian theatrical society, which was formed in the 19th century

== Other uses ==
- "Radio Telephone Operator", another name for Signaller
- Reverse takeover, the acquisition of a public company by a private company
- Return to office, a reduction or cessation of remote work
- Recovery time objective, the time for a business process to be restored after a disruption
- Referred-to-output
- Rejected takeoff, in aviation
- Regenerative thermal oxidizer, in off-gas treatment
- Retransmission timeout, in concept Transmission Control Protocol
- Rent-to-own, a type of contract
