= Portsmouth Sinfonia =

English orchestra

- Orchestra
- Founded: 1970
- Disbanded: 1981
- Location: Portsmouth, England
- Principal conductor: John Farley
- Website: https://www.portsmouthsinfonia.com/

The Portsmouth Sinfonia was an English orchestra founded in 1970 in Portsmouth, England, by the composer Gavin Bryars and students of the Portsmouth College of Art. It described itself as the "world's worst orchestra", as anyone could join, even those who could not play music. Members included Brian Eno, Michael Nyman, Simon Fisher Turner and Clive Langer.

In 1973, the Portsmouth Sinfonia signed a record deal with Transatlantic Records. Their first album, The Portsmouth Sinfonia Plays the Popular Classics, was produced by Eno and released in 1974. They also performed on Eno's 1974 album Taking Tiger Mountain (By Strategy). That May, the orchestra performed at the Royal Albert Hall, London. The performance was released as Hallelujah! — Portsmouth Sinfonia Live at the Albert Hall, produced again by Eno.

In 1979, the Portsmouth Sinfonia released 20 Classic Rock Classics, comprising covers of rock songs by acts such as the Who. They gave their last performance in 1980. Their single "Classical Muddly", a medley of popular classical pieces, reached number 38 on the UK singles chart in 1981.

The Portsmouth Sinfonia played as well as they could and did not intend to caricature professional orchestras. Members were expected to take the orchestra seriously, and rehearsal attendance was mandatory. The orchestra attracted fans who saw it in the tradition of eccentric English comedy. Eno said that though it was not intended as a joke, it was "sometimes extremely funny". Nyman described it as avant-garde, and the Sunday Times journalist Dan Cairns likened its openness to amateurs and rejection of virtuosity to punk music. The 1979 Rolling Stone Record Guide suggested their first two albums were the worst ever made.

== History ==
=== First performances ===
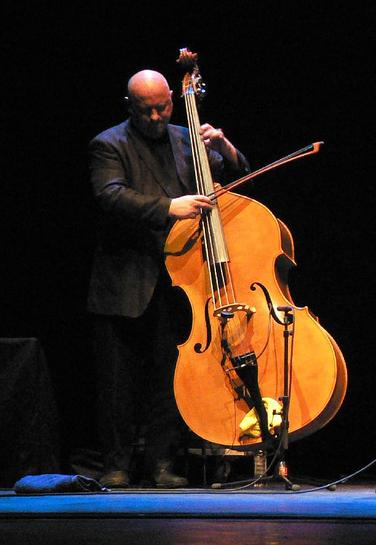
Gavin Bryars, the co-founder of the Portsmouth Sinfonia, in 2006

The Portsmouth Sinfonia was founded in Portsmouth, England, in May 1970, by students of the Portsmouth College of Art and the lecturer and composer Gavin Bryars. Anyone could join, even those who could not play music. One of the founder members described buying a saxophone that day and playing it at the first rehearsal. They performed pieces such as the William Tell Overture by Rossini, Symphony No. 5 by Beethoven, Also sprach Zarathustra by Strauss, the Hallelujah Chorus by Handel and Piano Concerto No. 1 by Tchaikovsky.

The musician and producer Brian Eno played clarinet with the orchestra between 1970 and 1974, and produced their first two albums. Other members included the musicians Michael Nyman, Simon Fisher Turner and Clive Langer. Their conductor, John Farley, once began a performance of "The Blue Danube", a waltz, with a count of "one, two, three, four". The Portsmouth Sinfonia performed in arts centres in the early 1970s and attracted new members.

=== Popular Classics ===
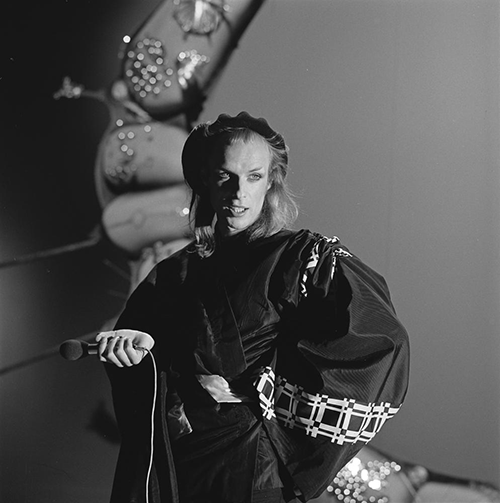
Brian Eno (pictured in 1974) played clarinet with the Portsmouth Sinfonia between 1970 and 1974 and produced their first two albums.

In 1973, with Eno's help, the Portsmouth Sinfonia signed a record deal with Transatlantic Records. The Transatlantic employee Martin Lewis became their manager, and said: "I just fell in love with them. They had something rare and beautiful. They were uninhibited by the stuffy rules and all the things I hated about classical music." Their first album, The Portsmouth Sinfonia Plays the Popular Classics, was released in March 1974. It was recorded in a single take, with no corrections.

=== Royal Albert Hall performance and Hallelujah! ===
The Portsmouth Sinfonia string section performed on "Put a Straw Under Baby" on Eno's 1974 album Taking Tiger Mountain (By Strategy). On 28 May 1974, by which point they had 82 members, they performed a sell-out concert at the Royal Albert Hall, London. They were joined by an accomplished pianist, Sally Binding, who transposed Piano Concerto No. 1 to A minor as the orchestra was "unnerved" by sharps and flats. They also recruited a choir of 350 people to sing the Hallelujah Chorus. The performance was released that year as Hallelujah! — Portsmouth Sinfonia Live at the Albert Hall.

=== 20 Classic Rock Classics ===
Inspired by the 1977 Classic Rock series of albums by the London Symphony Orchestra, in 1979, the Portsmouth Sinfonia released 20 Classic Rock Classics, with performances of rock songs including "Pinball Wizard" (1969) by the Who. That year, they performed at the Rainbow Theatre, London. Their last performance was in 1980 at the University of Paris.

=== Classical Muddly ===
In response to the 1981 album Hooked on Classics by the Royal Philharmonic Orchestra, a medley of popular classical pieces, the Portsmouth Sinfonia released its own medley, "Classical Muddly", which reached number 38 on the UK singles chart in 1981. The release was delayed when the Strauss publishers threatened an injunction arguing that its version of Also sprach Zarathustra had been rearranged without permission. Lewis responded that it was merely poorly played. Plans for the BBC to broadcast a film about the Portsmouth Sinfonia in 1994 were cancelled as the Bournemouth Symphony Orchestra feared the public might confuse the orchestras.

== Musicianship ==
William Tell Overture by Gioachino Rossini, played by the Portsmouth Sinfonia (opening, 1974)

The Portsmouth Sinfonia described itself as the "world's worst orchestra". Its spokesperson, Robin Mortimore, told Rolling Stone that the members played as well as they could and did not intend to caricature professional orchestras. Attendance at rehearsal was mandatory and members were expected to take the orchestra seriously.

Bryars said the notion that members were required to be novices was a "scurrilous rumour" spread by the BBC. Eno said the orchestra included a mixture of skilled and unskilled players, which created "a very blurry version, a soft-focus version, of classical music" and "produced some beautiful music ... There were some exquisite moments — the mixture of chance and choice."

Nyman described the orchestra as avant-garde and found it moving and exciting. He argued that the music was profound and subversive, and that the members were serious artists and experimental musicians, not deliberately incompetent. He said "the combination of everybody's individual errors built a musical structure that was incomparable".

== Response ==
Reviewing a recording of the orchestra's performance of the William Tell Overture for a December 1970 issue of Melody Maker, Michael Watts wrote: "I have heard the record that will possibly change the whole course of contemporary music, a record so profound in its implications and rhythmic sweep that it will reduce John Cage to silence ... It is music that approaches the cosmic and totally alters one's aesthetic appreciation of Rossini." On May 1, 1974, The Guardian published an article by Meirion Bowen arguing that the Portsmouth Sinfonia's success was a result of music industry corruption and the drive to novelty over artistry.

In 1975, Rolling Stone named Popular Classics its comedy record of the year. Reviewing Hallelujah! in Electronics Australia in 1978, Norman Marks wrote: "If you see this record on the stands, don't buy it as a present for anyone who takes their music seriously; it would be a quick way to destroy a beautiful friendship ... Quality, terrible!" In the 1979 Rolling Stone Record Guide, Frank Rose awarded the Portsmouth Sinfonia's first two albums one out of five, writing that they were perhaps the worst records ever made and "best dismissed as an intellectual joke". Reviewing Popular Classics for AllMusic, Joe Viglione gave it two out of five, writing that it was a "bad joke, which makes no sense and which fails to entertain".

The Portsmouth Sinfonia attracted fans who saw it in the tradition of eccentric English comedy such as Monty Python and the Bonzo Dog Doo-Dah Band. Eno said that though it was not intended as a joke, it was "sometimes extremely funny". The Sunday Times journalist Dan Cairns suggested the tendency to view the orchestra as humorous was a response to "the feelings of chaos and uncertainty induced by the strangely beautiful, even sinister, noise the orchestra arrived at by happenstance". He likened the openness to amateurs and rejection of virtuosity to punk music.

== Discography ==
=== Albums ===
- 1973: The Portsmouth Sinfonia Plays the Popular Classics (Transatlantic Records TRA 275)
- 1974: Hallelujah! — Portsmouth Sinfonia Live at the Albert Hall (Transatlantic Records TRA 285)
- 1979: 20 Classic Rock Classics (Philips 9109 231)

=== Singles ===
- 1973: William Tell Overture / Blue Danube Waltz (Transatlantic Records BIG 515) – from The Portsmouth Sinfonia Plays the Popular Classics
- 1974: An Der Schönen Blauen Donau / Also Sprach Zarathustra (Transatlantic Records M 25.609) – from The Portsmouth Sinfonia Plays the Popular Classics
- 1981: Classical Muddly / Hallelujah Chorus (Springtime Records WIP 6736)

=== Compilations ===
- 1993: Dead Parrot Society: The Best of British Comedy (Rhino Records R2 71049) – includes four tracks by the Portsmouth Sinfonia

=== With Brian Eno ===
- 1974: Taking Tiger Mountain (By Strategy) (Island ILPS 9309) – strings on "Put a Straw Under Baby"

== See also ==
- The Really Terrible Orchestra
- The Really Terrible Orchestra of the Triangle
