= Friends, Lovers, Chocolate =

2005 novel by Alexander McCall Smith

- First edition (UK)
- Author: Alexander McCall Smith
- Language: English
- Series: The Sunday Philosophy Club Series
- Publisher: Little, Brown (UK); Pantheon Books (US)
- Publication date: 20 September 2005
- Publication place: United Kingdom
- Media type: Hardback
- Pages: 272
- ISBN: 0-316-72780-6
- Preceded by: The Sunday Philosophy Club
- Followed by: The Right Attitude to Rain

Friends, Lovers, Chocolate is the second of the Sunday Philosophy Club series of novels by Alexander McCall Smith, set in Edinburgh, Scotland, and featuring the protagonist Isabel Dalhousie. It was first published in 2005, and is the sequel to The Sunday Philosophy Club.

== Plot synopsis ==
Isabel Dalhousie is in her early forties and lives alone in Edinburgh. Due to an inheritance from her late mother, she can work for a nominal fee as the editor of the Review of Applied Ethics. Her closest friends are her niece Cat, a young woman who runs a delicatessen; her housekeeper Grace, who is outspoken and interested in spiritualism; Cat's ex-boyfriend Jamie, a bassoonist to whom Isabel has been secretly attracted ever since they met; and Brother Fox, an urban fox who lives in Isabel's garden.

When visiting Cat's delicatessen one lunchtime, Isabel meets Ian, who has recently had a heart transplant, and seems to have gained the memories of the heart's former owner, particularly the memory of a sinister-looking man with hooded eyes and a scar on his forehead. Ian is worried that this man may have killed the original owner of the heart, and Isabel decides that they have a moral duty to try to find out more.

Later, Cat tells Isabel that she is about to receive a visit from Tomasso, an Italian whom Cat recently met at a friend's wedding. Cat suggests that he and Isabel, being of similar age, should go out to dinner. Isabel dismisses the idea, thinking of Jamie. Later that evening, she is shocked when Jamie tells her that he is having an affair with a married woman.

The next day, Isabel discovers that a young man, Rory Macloed, died in a hit-and-run accident on the day that Ian received his new heart. She visits Rory's mother, Rose, and meets Rose's partner Graeme, who perfectly fits Ian's description of the possible killer. However, Rose insists that Rory was not an organ donor.

That evening, Jamie and his lover Louise visit Isabel, who is determined to be polite; but her jealousy gets the better of her and she is rude to Louise, who leaves with Jamie. When Isabel phones Jamie the next day to apologize, Jamie says that he and Louise have broken up – because Jamie is still in love with Cat. Hearing this, Isabel decides to go out to dinner with Tomasso, who is very attractive. He impulsively suggests to Isabel that they go on a tour of Scotland, and she considers the benefits of having an Italian lover.

A few days later, Isabel sees Graeme in a pub, and phones Ian, who comes to the pub and confirms that Graeme is the man in his memory. Isabel is certain that Rose Macloed has been lying about Rory's not having been an organ donor, perhaps in order to protect Graeme. She asks her journalist friend Angus to speak to his contacts at the hospital, and he confirms that the young donor of Ian's heart was named Macloed.

Isabel meets Jamie for dinner, where he reveals that although the donor's name was Macloed, it was not Rory: a second young man, Gavin Macloed, died on the same day. Then the conversation turns to relationships, and Isabel tells Jamie that Cat will never love him. Jamie angrily leaves the restaurant.

Isabel, in a last attempt to solve the mystery of the heart, goes to visit Gavin's family in West Linton, just outside Edinburgh. His mother, Jean, tells her that her son's heart was donated, but that his father Euan, who is estranged from the family, does not know. Isabel sees a picture of Euan: he has hooded eyes and a scar on his forehead.

When she returns home, she finds a letter from Tomasso, telling her that he has been called back to Italy and will not be able to go traveling with her.

Isabel tells Ian about the second Macloed family, and they go together to tell Euan about his son's heart. Afterwards, Ian informs Isabel that he visited West Linton shortly after his operation, and spoke to several people there. From this Isabel concludes that Ian must have seen Euan, heard about his son's death, and subconsciously connected Euan's face with his new heart.

Finally, Jamie apologizes for his behavior in the restaurant, and he and Isabel spend the evening in the usual way, playing music and drinking wine at her house.

== Development ==
After criticism for the first novel in the series asserted that Isabel was difficult to empathise with, McCall Smith aimed in this novel to show "more of the human side of her". The title refers to "three issues of great philosophical importance" that test our moral inclinations. The "philosophical resonance" of friendship and lovers are evident; as McCall Smith says, "Friendship involves philosophical issues. Lovers can certainly give rise to moral difficulties." Chocolate represents "temptation and our inability to resist temptation" and is included for personal reasons, because the temptation of chocolate affects "most of us ... me in particular."

A key subplot is Jamie's affair with Louise, which can be seen as demonstrating his willingness to enter into relationships with older women and foreshadowing the events of the next book in the series.

== Reception ==
Despite Friends, Lovers, Chocolate being the second book in the Sunday Philosophy Club series, there are still comparisons to McCall Smith's previous series The No. 1 Ladies' Detective Agency. For example, Bookreporter.com says that, "Isabel Dalhousie is as wise, charmingly offbeat and original as Mma Ramotswe", adding that the novel is "As Scottish as a single malt whiskey" and that "McCall Smith's love of Scotland is as poignant as is his love of Botswana in his African series".

The Times Online was more critical of the novel's perceived slower pace, calling it "sleuthing for softies" and commenting "[It was] entertaining, but I longed for more drama".

However, Love Reading calls the book "utterly charming".

== Influences and references ==
=== W. H. Auden (1907-1973) ===
Isabel mentions being a fan of Auden, and insists that she sees links between Auden's poetry and that of Robert Burns, particularly Burns’ poem ‘A Red, Red Rose’. Late in the novel, when considering Gavin's death, Isabel also quotes several lines from Auden's ‘Bucolics’ (1955).

=== Robert Burns (1759–1796) ===
Burns was a Scottish poet who is mentioned several times in the novel. In particular, the opening chapter quotes from Burns’ inscription on the grave of another Scottish poet, Robert Fergusson, who is buried in the Kirk of the Canongate in Edinburgh:

This simple Stone directs Pale Scotia's way
To pour her sorrows o'er her Poet's Dust.

=== Sigmund Freud (1856-1939) ===
Freud was an Austrian psychoanalyst whose theories include that of the id, ego, and super-ego, which Isabel calls "scientifically shaky". She sums up this particular theory as "arguments over space, food and sex."

=== Robert Garioch (1909-1981) ===
Lines from the Scottish Garioch's poem ‘At Robert Fergusson’s Grave’ are quoted along with Burns’ inscription (see above) in the opening chapter.

=== Joseph Haydn (1732-1809) ===
Haydn and his oratorio ‘The Creation’ (1798) are mentioned by a theatre-goer early in the novel.

=== D. H. Lawrence (1885-1930) ===
Isabel quotes from Lawrence's 1923 poem ‘Snake’, and classes Lawrence (along with Hemingway) as a poet who would ‘throw rocks at snakes’. (Auden is classed as a poet who wouldn't.)

=== Oliver Sacks (1933-2015) ===
Sacks is a neurologist whose 1985 book The Man Who Mistook His Wife for a Hat is mentioned by Isabel as the precursor to a number of works with similar titles.

== Editions ==
The UK audio version of the book is abridged, and is read by Phyllis Logan. The US version is unabridged and is read by Davina Porter.
