= The Charming Quirks of Others =

- First edition
- Author: Alexander McCall Smith
- Language: English
- Series: The Sunday Philosophy Club Series
- Subject: Isabel Dalhousie
- Genre: Fiction
- Publisher: Little Brown
- Publication date: 7 August 2007
- Publication place: United Kingdom
- Media type: Hardback
- Pages: 246
- ISBN: 978-1-4087-0256-7
- Preceded by: The Lost Art of Gratitude
- Followed by: The Forgotten Affairs of Youth

The Charming Quirks of Others is the seventh book in The Sunday Philosophy Club Series by Alexander McCall Smith.

== Plot ==
Isabel Dalhousie is approached by the wife of a trustee of a prestigious Scottish school concerning a poison pen letter that her husband, a trustee of said school, has received, concerning one of the candidates for the post of headmaster.

Isabel's nieces, Cat, has a new boyfriend who is, coincidentally, one of the candidates for the aforementioned position.

Isabel works in her usual manner to get to the bottom of the mystery.
