= The Comfort of Saturdays =

2008 novel by Alexander McCall Smith

- Author: Alexander McCall Smith
- Language: English
- Series: The Sunday Philosophy Club Series
- Subject: Isabel Dalhousie
- Genre: Fiction
- Publisher: Little Brown
- Publication date: 2 October 2008
- Publication place: United Kingdom
- Media type: Hardback
- Pages: 234
- ISBN: 978-1-4087-0065-5
- Preceded by: The Careful Use of Compliments
- Followed by: The Lost Art of Gratitude

The Comfort of Saturdays is the fifth book in The Sunday Philosophy Club Series by Alexander McCall Smith. It was published in the U.S. as The Comforts of a Muddy Saturday.

== Plot ==
A chance conversation draws Isabel Dalhousie into the case of a doctor, believed by his wife to have been unfairly disgraced in an affair of a dangerous drug.

Her niece, Cat, is on holiday, leaving Isabel to run the delicatessen and attempt to get closer to, and possibly help, Cat's assistant, Eddie, whom she believes to have been damaged by something in his past.

Somewhat to Isabel's disquiet, her fiancé, Jamie, strikes up a friendship with an arrogant American composer.
