= The Really Terrible Orchestra of the Triangle =

The Really Terrible Orchestra of the Triangle (RTOOT) is an American amateur orchestra which was founded in 2008 by W. Sands Hobgood to encourage reasonably-competent musicians, who have been prevented from playing music with others due to lack of talent or other factors, to rehearse and perform in an ensemble of players of similar ability in the Raleigh/Durham/Chapel Hill area of North Carolina. The region is known as the Research Triangle, or the Triangle.

== Mission ==
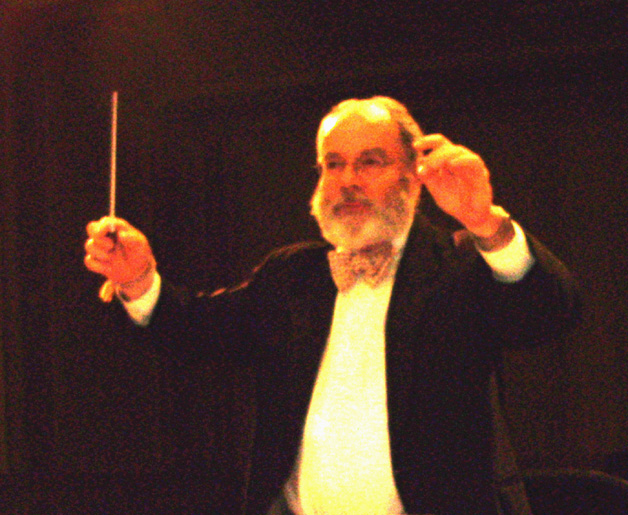
"My Strow" W. Sands Hobgood conducting a 2008 concert

RTOOT's mission is twofold: to provide a unique opportunity for musicians in the Triangle who want to play music with a group (regardless of talent), and to attract an audience from throughout the community. Auditions are partially an attempt to weed out players who are too competent. Professional musicians may be accepted if they play an instrument never played before, badly enough.

Inspired by Scotland's Really Terrible Orchestra, the group has pursued players who aren't quite competent enough for the area's established ensembles. RTOOT may never win a Grammy or a local battle of the bands. But clearly these questionably skilled musicians serve to remind all of us that everyone can find a place in the arts.

Founder W. Sands Hobgood was RTOOT's founding conductor until 2016, and used the term "culturtainment" to describe the unique (and often zany) nature of the orchestra's performances. He died at age 71 on August 27, 2016, while vacationing in the Brevard area of western North Carolina. The present principal conductor is Robert B. Petters, emeritus professor at North Carolina State University.

== Performances ==
RTOOT performs twice annually, in the spring and fall, at the Cary Arts Center in downtown Cary, North Carolina. Rehearsals are held on Sunday afternoons in the Herbert C. Young Community Center, adjacent to Cary's Town Hall campus. The orchestra's inaugural performance took place on December 10, 2008, in Hill Hall on the campus of the University of North Carolina at Chapel Hill.

Hobgood says the Terrible Orchestra isn't thumbing its nose at more established ensembles. "But we are kind of spoofing the music and the music establishment, people who are a little bit stuffy about their classical music".

"We try to get the music as best as we can. And then we add the schtick". Hobgood worked three weeks to get his mobile phone to ring in the middle of the famous silent section near the end of Strauss' The Blue Danube. "I answered my phone from the podium," he said. "The audience loved it."

The orchestra's antics include assigning the principal clarinetist as the concertmistress to lead its tuning, supposedly because the group did not realize that in a typical orchestra the role of concertmaster traditionally is played by the principal violinist. During a concert, "audience members are requested to turn their cell phones ON to cover up any terrible noises that might emanate from the stage."

RTOOT's concert programs, in addition to greetings from the conductor, program notes, singalong lyrics, and the history of the orchestra, have included coloring-book pages (for which "crayon girls" handed out crayons), puzzles, and excerpts from novels such as A Tale of Two Cities and Huckleberry Finn. Its programs are ambitious for an amateur group.

== See also ==
- The Really Terrible Orchestra
- Portsmouth Sinfonia
