= The Lost Art of Gratitude =

2009 novel by Alexander McCall Smith

- first edition
- Author: Alexander McCall Smith
- Language: English
- Series: The Sunday Philosophy Club Series
- Subject: Isabel Dalhousie
- Genre: Fiction
- Publisher: Little Brown
- Publication date: 3 September 2009
- Publication place: United Kingdom
- Media type: Hardback
- Pages: 249
- ISBN: 978-1-4087-0063-1
- Preceded by: The Comfort of Saturdays
- Followed by: The Charming Quirks of Others

The Lost Art of Gratitude is the sixth book in The Sunday Philosophy Club Series by Alexander McCall Smith.

== Plot ==
A second attempt by professors Lettuce and Dove to oust Isabel from her position at 'The Review of Applied Ethics' is thwarted and Isabel learns further lessons about gratitude and kindness.
