= Box (theatre) =

Seating area in a theater

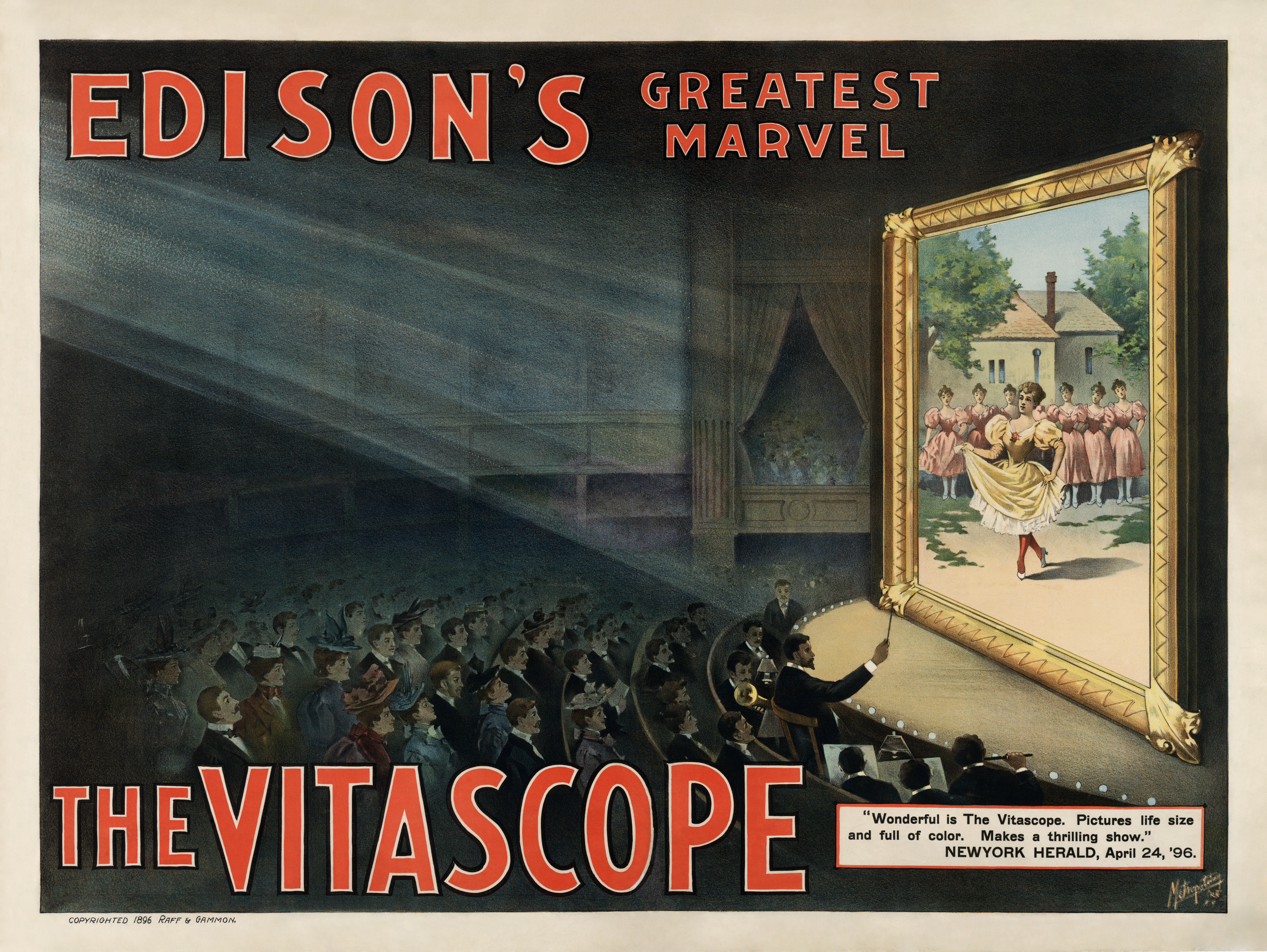
In this 1896 lithograph of people watching a Vitascope film, the curtains just left of the screen mark the top and sides of a box, with several people sketched inside of it; the curtains could be closed for privacy if the people renting the box wanted

In a theatre, a box, loge, or opera box is a small, separated seating area in the auditorium or audience for a limited number of people for private viewing of a performance or event.

The interior of the Palais Garnier, an opera house, showing the stage and auditorium, the latter including the floor seats and the opera boxes above

Boxes are typically placed immediately to the front, side and above the level of the stage. They are separate rooms with an open viewing area which typically seat five people or fewer. Usually all the seats in a box are taken by members of a single group of people. A state box or royal box is sometimes provided for dignitaries.

In theatres without box seating the loge can refer to a separate section at the front of the balcony.

Sports venues such as stadiums and racetracks also have royal boxes or enclosures, for example at the All England Club and Ascot Racecourse, where access is limited to royal families or other distinguished personalities. In other countries, sports venues have luxury boxes also known as skyboxes, where access is open to anyone who can afford tickets, sometimes bought by companies.

== History ==
Thomas Dekker, in his The Gull's Horn Book of 1609, is the first on record to use box in the theatrical sense. He described boxes as crammed spaces "in the suburbs of the stage" from which to watch a performance. Opera boxes were a status of wealth and high social standing in the 18th and 19th centuries. The Opera became a place not only for enjoying art and music but also for displaying wealth and social status. The epitome of extravagance could be viewed in the art, fashions and behaviors at the Opera.

== See also ==
- Balcony
- The gods (theatrical)
- Loggia
