= Nosebleed section =

Highest seats of a public arena

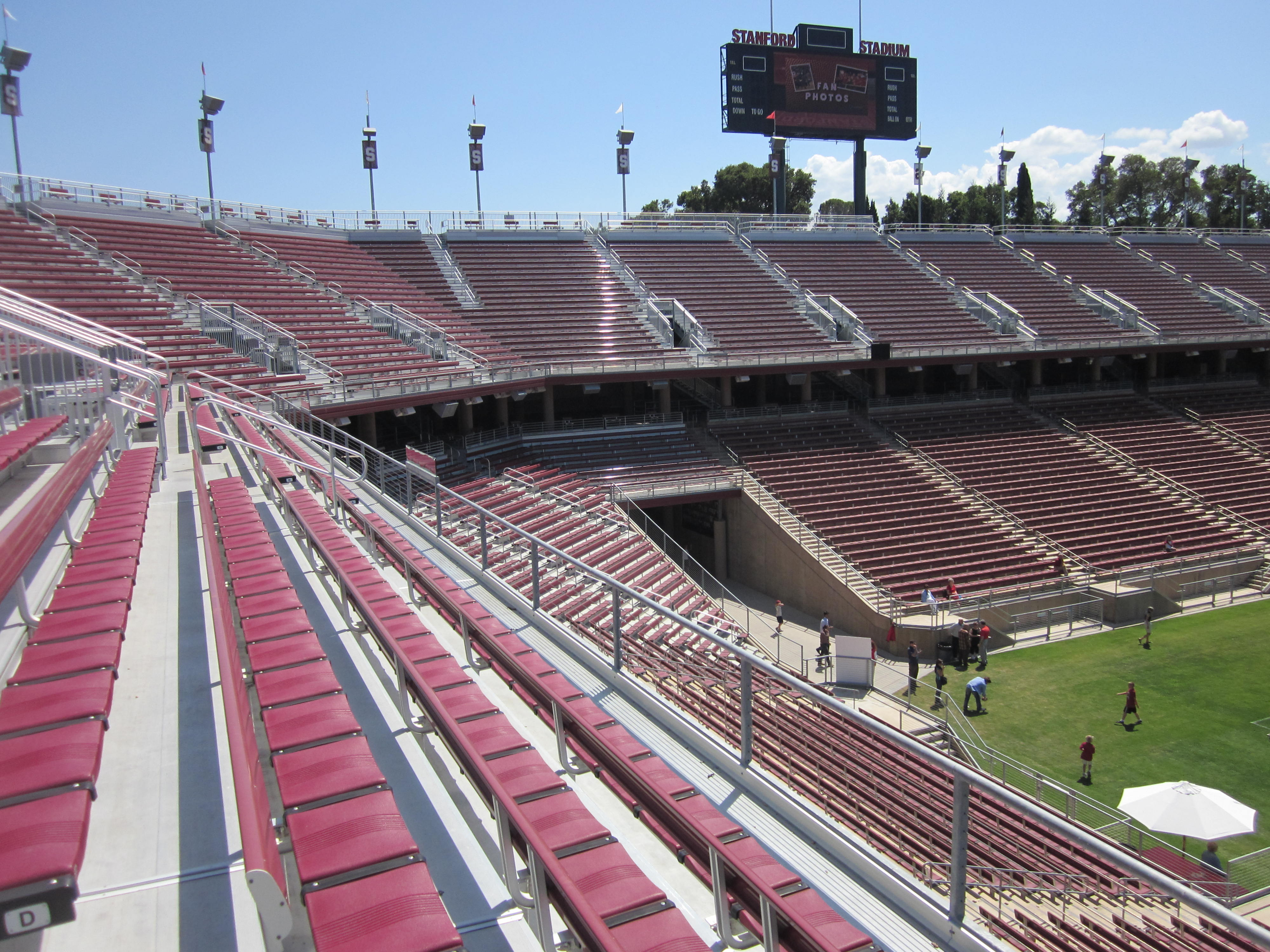
Nosebleed seats (upper rows) at Stanford Stadium

The nosebleed section is a colloquial expression designating the seats of a public area—‌typically an athletic stadium, gymnasium or theater—‌that are highest up, furthest from the desired activity, and (typically) cheapest. A common tongue-in-cheek reference to having seats in the upper tiers of a stadium (sometimes described as being in the rafters, although this word technically describes a structure with a specific function) is "sitting in the nosebleed section", or "nosebleed seats". The reference alludes to the tendency for mountain climbers to suffer nosebleeds at high altitudes.

The term appeared in print as early as 1953 when it was used to describe the last row in the end zone at Philadelphia's Municipal Stadium (later John F. Kennedy Stadium) during that year's Army-Navy American football game.

== Other uses ==
"The Nosebleed Section" is the name of a song by the Australian hip hop music group Hilltop Hoods. Contrary to the above definition, the Hilltop Hoods refer to the "nosebleed section" as the front row. The song commences with:

For my people in the front
In the nosebleed section

The song further features other references to the "nosebleed section" as the "front row" throughout the song.

== See also ==
- The dictionary definition of nosebleed seat at Wiktionary
- Peanut gallery
- The gods (theatrical)
- Bleachers
