= The Sunday Philosophy Club =

2004 novel by Alexander McCall Smith

- First UK edition
- Author: Alexander McCall Smith
- Language: English
- Series: The Sunday Philosophy Club Series
- Subject: Isabel Dalhousie
- Publisher: Little Brown (UK); Pantheon Books (US)
- Publication date: 28 September 2004
- Publication place: United Kingdom
- Media type: Hardback
- Pages: 256
- ISBN: 0-316-72817-9
- Followed by: Friends, Lovers, Chocolate

The Sunday Philosophy Club is the first of the Sunday Philosophy Club series of novels by Alexander McCall Smith, set in Edinburgh, Scotland, and featuring the protagonist Isabel Dalhousie. It was first published in 2004.

== Plot synopsis ==
Isabel Dalhousie is a philosopher in her early forties and lives alone in a large aging house in the south of Edinburgh. Thanks to a large inheritance left to her by her late mother, she is able to work for a nominal fee as the editor of the Review of Applied Ethics. Her closest friends are her niece Cat, a young attractive woman who runs a delicatessen; her housekeeper Grace, an outspoken woman with an interest in spiritualism; Cat's ex-boyfriend Jamie, a bassoonist to whom Isabel has been secretly attracted ever since they met; and Brother Fox, an urban fox who lives in Isabel's garden.

During a trip to the theatre, Isabel sees a young man fall to his death from the gods. As the young man falls, she catches his eye, and sees an expression of shock of his face, which suggests to her that the police's verdict of suicide is wrong. She decides to find out what really happened.

== Development ==
The original title of the book was The Crushed Strawberry, named for the colour of Toby's trousers, but it was changed to The Sunday Philosophy Club after a suggestion by McCall Smith's editor.

The book marks the first literary appearance of the Really Terrible Orchestra, a real-life amateur orchestra co-founded by McCall in 1995.

== Reception ==
The book garnered mixed reviews, with many reviewers comparing it unfavourably to McCall Smith's better-known series The No. 1 Ladies' Detective Agency. The New York Times sees Isabel as a "(No. 2) Lady Detective Philosopher" (in comparison to the "No. 1 Lady Detective" Precious Ramotswe)" and described her philosophical musings as "less than riveting"; it concluded that the novel is "the literary equivalent of herbal tea and a cozy fire". BookReporter.com agreed, calling the story "slightly ponderous" and advising that "the tone is a bit daunting for readers who never progressed beyond Philosophy 101 in college". Likewise, The Times Online called the novel "airless and exhausting", adding that "We can only hope that the Sunday Philosophy Club remains indefinitely postponed".

However, the St. Louis Post-Dispatch called Isabel "the anti-Precious" and suggested that the novel will "delight McCall Smith's existing fans and win him some new ones". USA Today's review was also positive, commending Isabel's penchant for philosophical self-examination and seeing the novel as a "painless introduction to philosophical questions".

RTÉ’s website agreed that "McCall Smith makes some excellent points about the absence of moral responsibility" but found that Isabel's lack of flaws and wealthy status made her difficult to identify with: "If McCall Smith had presented a heroine with more questionable ethics, this might have been a far more interesting story."

McCall Smith's descriptions of Edinburgh are generally commended for their veracity: for example, the San Francisco Chronicle called them "vivid and seamless".

== Editions ==
The UK audio version of the book is abridged, and is read by Phyllis Logan. The US version is unabridged and is read by Davina Porter.
