= The Careful Use of Compliments =

- 1st edition (US)
- Author: Alexander McCall Smith
- Language: English
- Series: The Sunday Philosophy Club Series
- Subject: Isabel Dalhousie
- Publisher: Little, Brown (UK); Pantheon Books (US)
- Publication date: 7 August 2007
- Publication place: United Kingdom
- Media type: Hardback
- Pages: 256
- ISBN: 0-375-42301-X
- Preceded by: The Right Attitude to Rain
- Followed by: The Comfort of Saturdays

The Careful Use of Compliments is the fourth book in The Sunday Philosophy Club Series by Alexander McCall Smith.

== Plot ==
After her son, Charlie's, birth Isabel feels that her life has hit a happy (or happier) patch. Deciding that she may bid for a painting at auction, she visits the showroom, where she has arranged to meet Jamie (her son's father). Jamie proposes but Isabel says that she thinks they should wait, half-hoping that Jamie will press his case. She is a little disappointed when he agrees with her, but accepts that they have made the correct decision.

To her distress, she learns that the editorial board of the Review of Applied Ethics, which she edits, has decided to replace her, an action that she effectively reverses although not without her usual philosophical qualms and musings.

Meanwhile, she becomes interested in the life and recent death of Andrew McInnes, an artist most of whose paintings feature the island of Jura and who was lost in a boating accident there some years previously. Travelling with her fiancé, Jamie, and Charlie to the place of his loss she discovers new information about a more recent painter who was painting similar scenes. Her investigations into a possible art fraud unearth something quite unexpected.

== Philosophical Themes ==
At the beginning of the novel, Isabel's baby is three months old. Reflecting on philosophy and infancy, she muses that Immanuel Kant, "although he would have acknowledged, of course, that each baby should be treated as an end in its own right, and not as a means to an end," would most likely have found babies "too irrational, too messy," whereas her fellow Scot David Hume "would have found babies good company because they were full of emotions, unexpressed perhaps, or made known only in the crudest manners, but emotions nonetheless."

Isabel clearly likes Hume, both as a philosopher and as a person. He was, she recalls, known as "the good Davey". She is therefore shocked when a philosopher she dislikes dismisses Hume with the remark that "there's so much more to be learnt about our emotions" from magnetic resonance imaging. "Isabel stared at him incredulously. This was pure nonsense."

One of Plato's most famous metaphors has a particular significance for Isabel: "There were two horses in the soul, she thought, as Socrates had said in the Phaedrus — the one, unruly, governed by passions, pulling in the direction of self-indulgence; the other, restrained, dutiful, governed by a sense of shame." Torn between seeking petty satisfaction and being high-minded in her dealings with those who had tried to oust her as editor of the Review, she thinks: "Plato's white horse and dark horse. She closed her eyes. Revenge was sweet, but it was wrong, and she should not repay them in the coin they had used on her. No, she should not." Her lawyer senses that he has "just witnessed a great moral struggle."

Caught in another of her moral quandaries, Isabel briefly considers "the attractions of disengagement, of a policy of not worrying about the world." But then she muses that, if one looks hard enough, one will probably find that the "big issues" that disengaged people ignore have "merely been replaced by small concerns that can be every bit as pressing. The successes of a football team — or, more pertinently, its failures — could be the cause of a good deal of anguish; arguments with neighbours, worries over money — all of these could weigh as heavily as the greater matters. So being disengaged was more of an apparent solution than a real one."

== Reception ==
Kirkus Reviews said: "Emphasizing, as usual, ethical quiddities that most mysteries either ignore or take for granted, Smith produces another absorbing case in which Isabel doesn't so much detect as interfere in a quietly masterful way more frivolous sleuths can only envy."
