= Edward Brooke-Hitching =

English writer and map-collector

- Born: London, England
- Occupations: Author and screenwriter
- Writing career
- Language: English
- Notable works: Fox Tossing, Octopus Wrestling and Other Forgotten Sports, The Phantom Atlas, The Golden Atlas, The Sky Atlas, The Madman's Library
- Website: www.edwardbrookehitching.com

Edward Brooke-Hitching is an English author, and a researcher and writer for BBC panel show QI. He is the son of rare book collector and antiquarian dealer Franklin Brooke-Hitching, and a descendant of the printer and bibliographer William Blades, who wrote the history of book preservation The Enemies of Books.

Brooke-Hitching was exposed to his father's work through his rare bookshop, and worked for an auctioneer in London before turning to a writing career.

His Fox Tossing, Octopus Wrestling and Other Forgotten Sports described 90 obsolete pastimes such as fox tossing, octopus wrestling and ski ballet. His The Phantom Atlas describes places which appear on maps but do not exist: the Times reviewer says that it "shows how places that aren’t there can endure, sometimes for centuries, once a map-maker has inked them in". The Sky Atlas was shortlisted for the 2019 Edward Stanford Travel Writing Awards in the "Illustrated travel book" category and picked as one of the 50 Christmas books of the year by The Herald.

In 2007 he directed a short documentary about the Edinburgh-based Really Terrible Orchestra.

He appeared on BBC Radio 4's The Museum of Curiosity in October 2019. His hypothetical donation to this imaginary museum was "a land grant for 60 acres of land in Poyais", being a document produced by 1820s fraudster Gregor MacGregor.

== Selected publications ==
- Brooke-Hitching, Edward (2015). Fox Tossing, Octopus Wrestling and Other Forgotten Sports: The Most Dangerous and Bizarre Sports in History. Simon & Schuster. ISBN 978-1471148989.
- Brooke-Hitching, Edward (2016). The Phantom Atlas: The Greatest Myths, Lies and Blunders on Maps. Simon & Schuster. ISBN 978-1471159459.
- Brooke-Hitching, Edward (2018). The Golden Atlas: The Greatest Explorations, Quests and Discoveries on Maps. Simon & Schuster. ISBN 978-1471166822.
- Brooke-Hitching, Edward (2019). The Sky Atlas: The Greatest Maps, Myths and Discoveries of the Universe. Simon & Schuster. ISBN 978-1471178931.
- Brooke-Hitching, Edward (1 October 2020). The Madman's Library: The Greatest Curiosities of Literature. Simon & Schuster. ISBN 9781471166914.
- Brooke-Hitching, Edward (14 October 2021). The Devil's Atlas: An Explorer's Guide to Heavens, Hells and Afterworlds. Simon & Schuster. ISBN 978-1398503557.
- Brooke-Hitching, Edward (26 October 2023). Love: A Curious History in 50 Objects. Simon & Schuster. ISBN 978-1398522718.
