= The gods (theatrical) =

Seating area in a theater

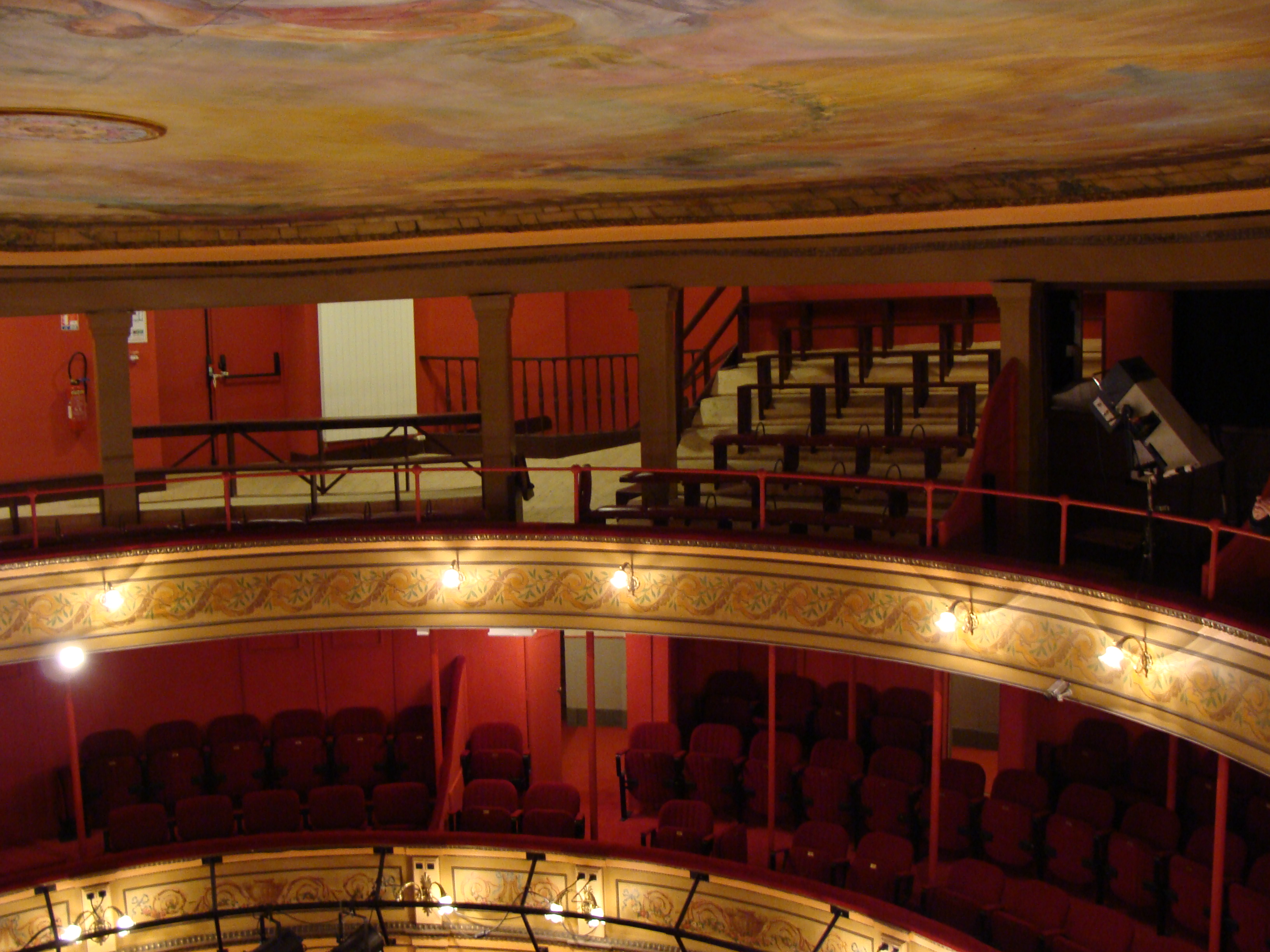
View of the paradis in Théâtre de Douai

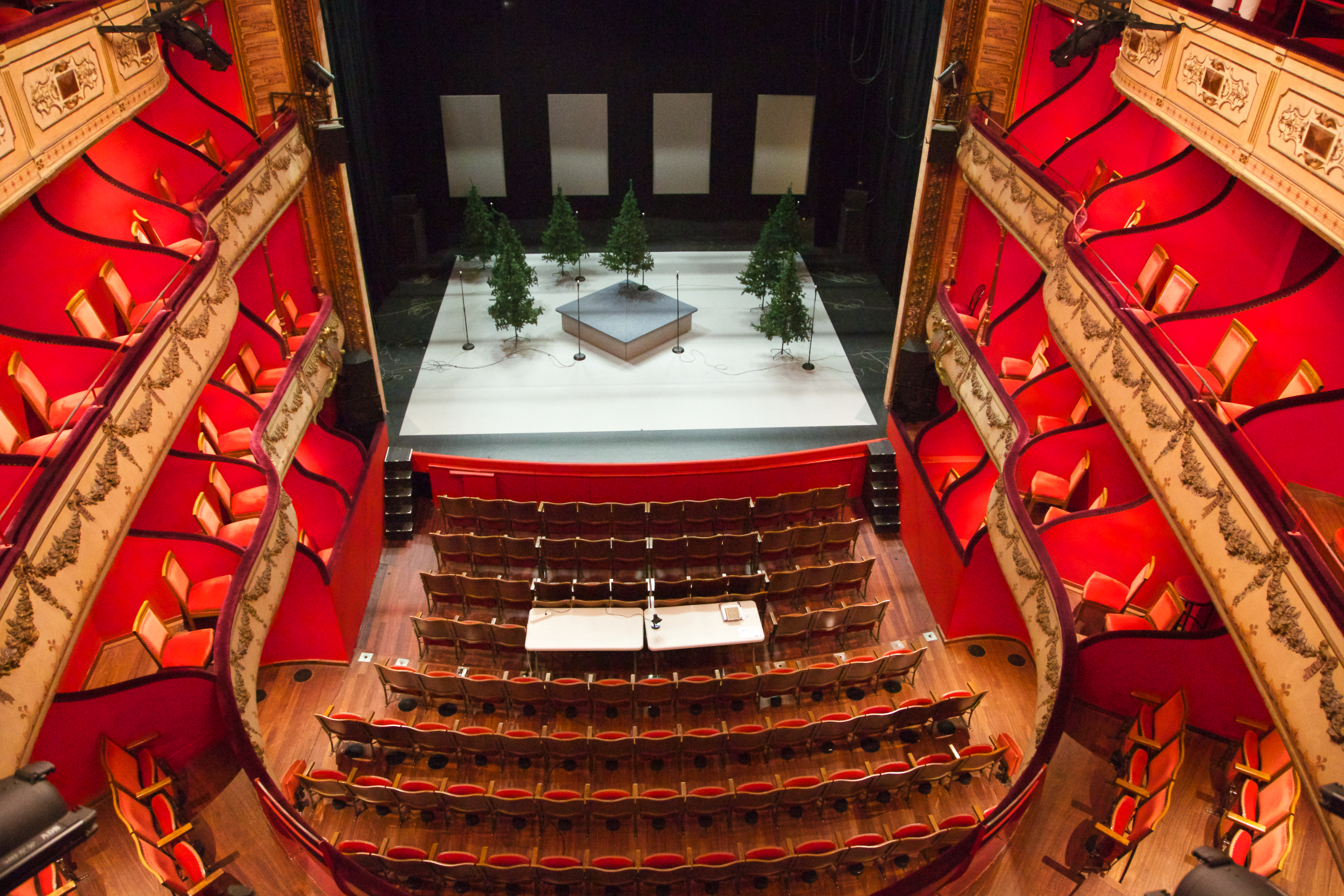
View of the stage from the paradis of the Théâtre du Jeu de Paume, Aix-en-Provence

The gods (UK English), or sometimes paradise, is a theatrical term referring to the highest areas of a theatre such as the upper balconies. These are generally the cheapest seats; the moniker may have come from the ornately painted ceilings in older venues, often based on mythological themes. Similarly those seated so high up look down upon both the performers and the occupants of more expensive seats, akin to the Greek pantheon looking down from Mount Olympus upon the lives of mortals.

There are references to the "gods" in many plays and films, among them the famous French film Les Enfants du paradis (or Children of Paradise in its US release), described as "set in the teeming theatre district of 1840s Paris (the "boulevard du crime"), the paradise of the film's title is a reference to "the gods", the highest, cheapest seats in the theatre, occupied by the poorest of the poor. As the well-known 1930s-and-later screenwriter Jacques Prévert said when asked about the meaning of the title, "it refers to the actors ... and the audiences too, the good-natured, working-class audience".

== See also ==
- Bleachers
- Box (theatre)
- Nosebleed seats
- Peanut gallery
