= The Really Terrible Orchestra =

UK orchestra

The Really Terrible Orchestra (RTO) is a British amateur orchestra, founded in 1995 by the Edinburgh-based businessman Peter Stevenson and the author Alexander McCall Smith. The inspiration for Stevenson and McCall Smith was the enjoyment that their children were having with their school orchestras. They decided to look for a local amateur orchestra with which they could enjoy playing music for the fun of it. They could not find such an orchestra, and formed the RTO as a result, with Richard Neville Towle as its conductor.

McCall Smith has expressed the low quality of the orchestra's playing very directly:

The name was carefully chosen: what it said was what you would get.

Aside from their yearly concerts at the Edinburgh Fringe, the orchestra also features in the novel The Sunday Philosophy Club by Alexander McCall Smith. In the foyer of the Canongate Kirk, an Edinburgh church and their regular venue, the orchestra sells CDs of their performances.

In 2005 a documentary film about the RTO, The Really Terrible Orchestra, directed by Edward Brooke-Hitching, was selected for the 60th International Edinburgh Film Festival in 2006. It won the Baillie Gifford Award for best short Scottish documentary.

The RTO made their London debut on 3 November 2007 at the Cadogan Hall, London, in a sold-out concert.

On 1 April 2009, the RTO travelled to the United States and played at the New York Town Hall on its first (one-date) overseas tour.

The orchestra ventured onto Continental Europe for the first time on 16 April 2011. They played two concerts at Utrecht's Academiegebouw as part of the City2Cities Utrecht International Literature Days. The proceedings were dignified by Dutch poets J. Bernlef and Anna Enquist.

== See also ==
- Portsmouth Sinfonia
- The Really Terrible Orchestra Of the Triangle
